= Keith Sonderling =

American attorney (born 1982)

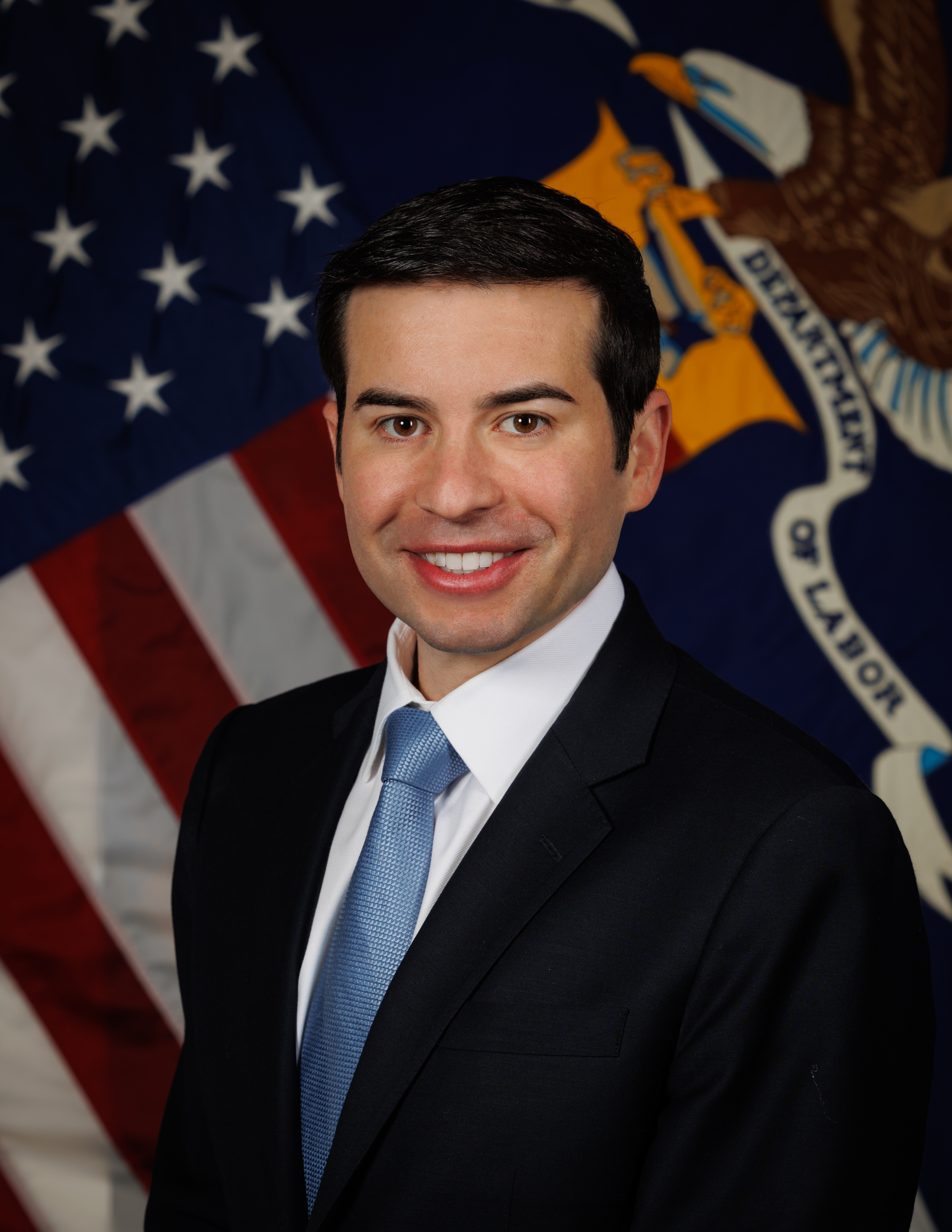
- Official portrait, 2025

31st United States Secretary of Labor
- Incumbent
- Assumed office April 20, 2026 (Note: Acting: April 20, 2026 – October 2, 2026)
- President: Donald Trump
- Deputy: Himself (Note: While he was acting secretary)
- Preceded by: Lori Chavez-DeRemer

38th United States Deputy Secretary of Labor
- In office March 12, 2025 – October 2, 2026
- President: Donald Trump
- Preceded by: Julie Su
- Succeeded by: Vacant

Acting Director of the United States Office of Government Ethics
- Incumbent
- Assumed office June 23, 2026
- President: Donald Trump
- Preceded by: Eric Ueland
Additional offices 2019‍–‍2025
Acting Director of the Institute of Museum and Library Services
In office March 20, 2025 – November 16, 2025
President	Donald Trump
Preceded by	Cyndee Landrum (acting)
Acting Under Secretary of Commerce for Minority Business Development
In office March 18, 2025 – November 16, 2025
President	Donald Trump
Preceded by	Eric Morrissette
Succeeded by	Joyce Meyer (acting)
Vice Chair of the Equal Employment Opportunity Commission
In office September 22, 2020 – January 20, 2021
President	Donald Trump
Preceded by	Jenny R. Yang
Succeeded by	Jocelyn Samuels
Member of the Equal Employment Opportunity Commission
In office September 22, 2020 – August 30, 2024
President	Donald Trump; Joe Biden
Preceded by	Charlotte Burrows
Succeeded by	Brittany Panuccio
Acting Administrator of the Wage and Hour Division
In office c. February 2019 – April 29, 2019
President	Donald Trump
Preceded by	Bryan Jarrett (acting)
Succeeded by	Cheryl Stanton

Personal details
- Born: November 25, 1982 (age 43) New York City, New York, U.S.
- Party: Republican
- Spouse: Fara Klein (m. 2019)
- Children: 2
- Education: University of Florida (BS); Nova Southeastern University (JD)

Keith E. Sonderling (born November 25, 1982) is an American attorney who has served as the 31st United States secretary of labor since 2026. He has additionally served as the acting director of the United States Office of Government Ethics since 2026. Sonderling served as the deputy secretary of labor from 2025 to 2026 and as the acting director of the Institute of Museum and Library Services and the acting under secretary of commerce for minority business development from March to November 2025. He served as the vice chair and a member of the Equal Employment Opportunity Commission from 2020 to 2024 and as the acting administrator of the Wage and Hour Division in 2019.

Sonderling graduated from the University of Florida with a Bachelor of Science and from Nova Southeastern University's Shepard Broad College of Law with a Juris Doctor. He joined Gunster, Yoakley & Stewart as an associate in 2008. Sonderling's work specialized in employment and business litigation. In September 2017, he became a senior policy advisor at the Wage and Hour Division and later served as its deputy administrator and acting administrator. In July 2019, President Donald Trump nominated Sonderling to serve on the Equal Employment Opportunity Commission. He was confirmed by the Senate in September 2020 and served as its vice chair until January 2021. Sonderling's term ended in August 2024.

In November 2024, Trump named Sonderling as his nominee to serve as the deputy secretary of labor. Sonderling was confirmed by the Senate in March 2025. In his tenure as the deputy secretary of labor, Sonderling largely managed the operations of the Department of Labor, particularly amid Secretary of Labor Lori Chavez-DeRemer's frequent absences. In April 2026, Sonderling became the acting secretary of labor after Chavez-DeRemer resigned over several inquiries into her conduct. In June, Trump announced that he would nominate Sonderling as the secretary of labor. He was confirmed by the Senate in September and sworn in the following month, becoming the youngest person to hold the position.

== Early life and education (1982–2008) ==
Keith E. Sonderling was born on November 25, 1982, in New York City, New York. Sonderling is Jewish. His grandparents survived The Holocaust. He attended Spanish River Community High School in Boca Raton, Florida. Sonderling graduated magna cum laude from the University of Florida with a Bachelor of Science and graduated magna cum laude from Nova Southeastern University's Shepard Broad College of Law with a Juris Doctor in 2008.

== Career ==
=== Legal and political work (2008–2017) ===
In November 2008, Sonderling joined Gunster, Yoakley & Stewart in West Palm Beach as an associate specializing in employment and business litigation. He represented Palm Beach's pops orchestra and its conductor, Bob Lappin, in a federal lawsuit accusing Lappin of sexual impropriety. Sonderling became a partner in Gunster, Yoakley & Stewart in March 2015. He additionally represented plaintiffs who alleged that the operators of the Palm House condominium-hotel had engaged in a conspiracy to defraud investors, as well as Florida Atlantic University in a lawsuit filed by the scholar James Tracy, who was fired for claiming the Sandy Hook Elementary School shooting was a hoax.

In November 2012, Florida governor Rick Scott appointed Sonderling to the judicial nominating commission for the state's Fourth District Court of Appeal; he was reappointed to the commission and named its chairman in October 2016.

=== Other activities ===
Sonderling served on the board of directors of the Morse Life Health System, Jewish Community Relations Council in Palm Beach, the Boca Raton Chamber of Commerce, and Leadership Florida.

== Wage and Hour Division (2017–2020) ==
In September 2017, Bloomberg Law reported that Sonderling had joined the Wage and Hour Division as a senior policy advisor, becoming the division's first political appointee under President Donald Trump. By 2019, he had become the division's deputy administrator and its acting administrator.

At the Wage and Hour Division, Sonderling helped restore the division's practice of issuing opinion letters to employers and workers on the application of federal wage-and-hour laws. Sonderling additionally helped developed the Payroll Audit Independent Determination program, relaxing litigation and penalties for employers that self-report violations. In March 2019, Sonderling proposed regulations increasing the minimum annual salary threshold for the executive, administrative, and professional overtime exemptions under the Fair Labor Standards Act of 1938 from $23,660 to $35,308. In April 2019, Sonderling issued an opinion letter concluding that workers providing services through a particular gig-economy platform qualified as independent contractors rather than employees under the FLSA. Additionally, Sonderling advanced a proposal to clarify how bonuses, benefits, and other forms of compensation are included in overtime calculations.

In May 2019, Sonderling traveled to Guam and signed a memorandum of understanding with the Guam Department of Labor to strengthen enforcement of federal and territorial wage-and-hour laws. Sonderling also participated in coordinating federal labor resources for Guam following Typhoon Wutip.

== Member of the Equal Employment Opportunity Commission (2020–2024) ==
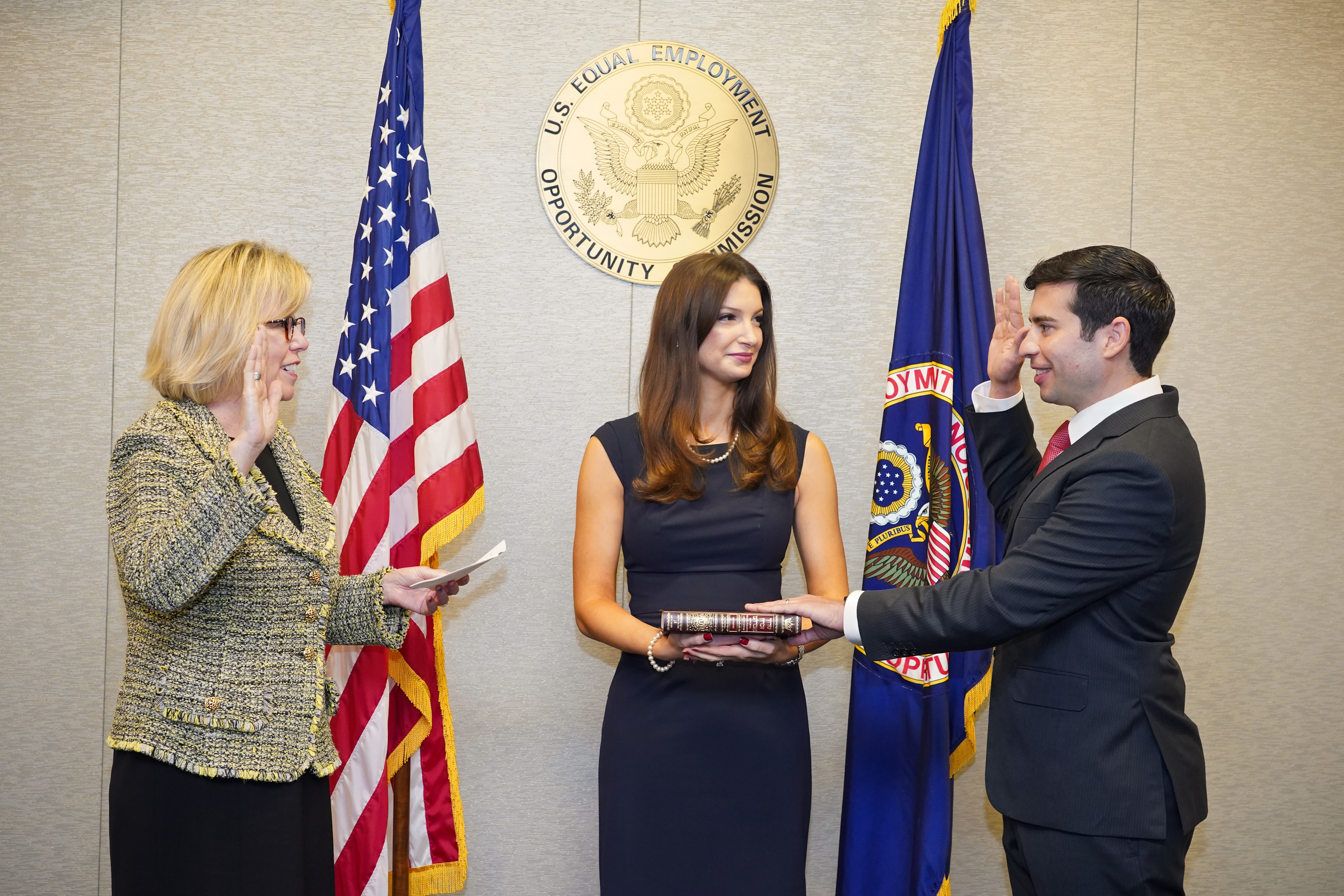
Sonderling is sworn in as a member of the Equal Employment Opportunity Commission in September 2020

=== Nomination and confirmation ===
On July 8, 2019, President Donald Trump nominated Sonderling to serve on the Equal Employment Opportunity Commission as a Republican member. Sonderling's nomination was delayed after Trump did not immediately name a Democratic member. Senate Majority Leader Mitch McConnell filed a motion of cloture for a confirmation vote on his nomination in September 2020. He was sworn in that month. Sonderling additionally served as the commission's vice chair until January 2021, when President Joe Biden appointed Jocelyn Samuels to the position. In July 2024, Sonderling announced that he would leave the following month at the expiration of his term.

=== Tenure ===
During his tenure, Sonderling focused on the intersection of artificial intelligence and employment discrimination, advocating for the application of existing federal law to AI-driven hiring and workplace decisions. In a December 2023 interview with Politico, he supported employer discretion over disclosing AI use in hiring while advocating for additional government guidance. In an August 2024 interview with Law360, Sonderling identified his work on artificial intelligence as one of his principal accomplishments. He voted against the commission's final rule implementing the Pregnant Workers Fairness Act and against its updated workplace harassment guidance. From 2022 to 2023, Sonderling served as an adjunct professor of employment law at George Washington University Law School.

== Deputy Secretary of Labor (2025–2026) ==
=== Nomination and confirmation ===
Sonderling led Donald Trump's second presidential transition for the Equal Employment Opportunity Commission alongside Janet Dhillon and led the landing team at the Department of Labor. In November 2024, Bloomberg Law reported that Sonderling was among several possible candidates to serve as Donald Trump's secretary of labor. Several business organizations proposed that Trump nominate Sonderling as his deputy secretary of labor; according to Politico, Sonderling considered moving to the private sector after his term ended from the Equal Employment Opportunity Commission.

On January 15, 2025, Trump named Sonderling as his nominee for deputy secretary of labor. After Trump's inauguration, Sonderling served as a senior advisor to acting Secretary of Labor Vince Micone. He appeared before the Senate Committee on Health, Education, Labor and Pensions on February 27. The Department of Government Efficiency's efforts to institute mass firings at the agency overshadowed Sonderling's hearing as he was questioned by Democrats on the committee over whether he was aware of personnel firings at the Department of Labor. He told the committee that he did not know how many workers had been fired. Sonderling was confirmed by the committee on March 6 and by the Senate in a vote along party lines on March 12.

=== Tenure ===
Sonderling speaking at the International Labour Organization in June 2025

In his tenure as the deputy secretary of labor, Sonderling managed the Department of Labor amid frequent absences by Chavez-DeRemer. His work involved meeting with the heads of enforcement agencies and setting the department's policies. Sonderling assisted in selecting candidates for several agencies, including the National Labor Relations Board and the Equal Employment Opportunity Commission. Sonderling revived the department's opinion letter and Payroll Audit Independent Determination programs. In January 2026, Sonderling stated that he would seek to include investments such as private-equity and private-credit in pension plans. That month, he addressed the press on the monthly jobs report, a responsibility usually reserved for the secretary of labor. Sonderling is a critic on the growing patchwork of state AI laws and in 2026 published federal resources, such as the AI Literacy Framework for employers and accompanying text-based AI training for American workers.

== Secretary of Labor (2026–present) ==
=== Acting appointment ===
On April 20, 2026, Lori Chavez-DeRemer resigned as the secretary of labor amid several investigations into her conduct. Sonderling became the acting secretary of labor that day. He was supported by several officials in the Trump administration, allies of Donald Trump, including Jason Miller and Alex Bruesewitz, as well as business organizations. Federal law allowed for Sonderling to serve as the acting secretary of labor indefinitely, according to an interpretation of a statute that was utilized by the Biden administration to have Julie Su serve as the acting secretary of labor for nearly two years. He was the youngest person to serve in the position.

=== Nomination and confirmation ===
Secretary of the Treasury Scott Bessent ceremonially swearing in Sonderling in October 2026

After his appointment, Sonderling was expected to be nominated as the secretary of labor, according to Politico. On June 29, 2026, Trump announced that he would nominate Sonderling to the position. Sonderling appeared before the Senate Committee on Health, Education, Labor and Pensions on July 16. Sonderling was questioned by Democratic senators over his labor policies, which were perceived as anti-worker. He affirmed the Trump administration's decision to handle some of the Department of Education's operations at the Department of Labor and criticized the "gloom and doom narrative" about the effect of artificial intelligence on the workforce.

The Senate Committee on Health, Education, Labor and Pensions voted to advance Sonderling's nomination along party lines on July 30. Sonderling was confirmed by the Senate as the secretary of labor in a 47–41 vote. He was sworn in on October 2.

== Acting positions (2025–present) ==
On March 20, 2025, Trump named Sonderling as the acting director of the Institute of Museum and Library Services in an effort to minimize the agency to its constitutional framework. That day, he visited the agency's office with a team, including a member of the Department of Government Efficiency. Several senators sent a letter to Sonderling that month requesting that he continue the intent of the Institute of Museum and Library Services. In April, he fired every member of the agency's board. Sonderling was additionally appointed to serve as the acting under secretary of commerce for minority business development. Nate Cavanaugh, a member of the Department of Government Efficiency, invoked Sonderling's authority to terminate grants to the agency's business centers in April 2025. In June 2026, Trump designated Sonderling as the acting director of the United States Office of Government Ethics.

In October 2026, Trump appointed Sonderling, alongside Kevin Hassett and Andrea Lucas, to a committee to investigate allegations against Federal Reserve governor Lisa D. Cook.

== Personal life ==
In September 2019, Sonderling married Fara Klein, a government affairs manager at the American Forest & Paper Association. They have two children.

== Notes ==
Political offices
Preceded by Julie Su	United States Deputy Secretary of Labor; 2025–2026	Vacant
Preceded by Lori Chavez-DeRemer	United States Secretary of Labor; 2026–present	Incumbent
Order of precedence
Preceded by Howard Lutnick as United States Secretary of Commerce	Order of precedence of the United States as Secretary of Labor	Succeeded by Robert F. Kennedy Jr. as United States Secretary of Health and Human Services
U.S. presidential line of succession
Preceded by Howard Lutnick as United States Secretary of Commerce	Eleventh in line as Secretary of Labor	Succeeded by Robert F. Kennedy Jr. as United States Secretary of Health and Human Services
