= Dhillon =

Jat clan from Punjab

- Jat clan
- Ethnicity: Punjabi
- Location: Punjab
- Language: Punjabi
- Religion: Sikhism, Islam, Hinduism

Dhillon (Punjabi: ਢਿੱਲੋਂ (Gurmukhi); ڈھلوں (Shahmukhi) pronunciation: [ʈìlːõː]; Hindi: ढिल्लों) is one of the largest Jat clans found in the Punjab region of India and Pakistan. Dhillon sardars (chiefs) ruled the Bhangi Misl (sovereign state) in the Sikh confederacy.

== Notable Dhillons ==
Notable people who bear the name, who may or may not be affiliated with the tribe, include:

- Amritpal Singh Dhillon, an Indian-born Canadian singer, rapper, songwriter and record producer
- Bob Singh Dhillon, Canadian businessman and property owner
- Binnu Dhillon, Indian actor
- Chhajja Singh Dhillon, 18th-century founder of the Bhangi Misl
- Gurinder Singh Dhillon, guru of Radha Soami Satsang Beas
- Gurdial Singh Dhillon (1915–1992), Speaker of Lok Sabha, the lower house of the Parliament of India
- Hari Singh Dhillon, 18th-century maharaja
- Harmeet Dhillon (born 1969), American lawyer and political official
- Prem Dhillon, Indian Punjabi-language singer, songwriter
- Janet Dhillon, American lawyer and business executive, chair of the Equal Employment Opportunity Commission 2019–2021
- Jarnail Singh Dhillon, former Indian football player
- Jhanda Singh Dhillon, 18th-century maharaja
- Joginder Singh Dhillon (1914–2003), officer in the British Indian Army and Indian Army
- Kanwal Jeet Singh Dhillon, is a retired Lieutenant General Officer of the Indian Army
- Navneet Kaur Dhillon, Femina Miss India 2013 and Bollywood and television actress
- Poonam Dhillon, Bollywood and television actress
- Rukshar Dhillon, British actress
- Uttam Dhillon, American attorney and law enforcement official, husband of Janet Dhillon
- Vic Dhillon, Canadian politician
- Zulfiqar Ahmad Dhillon (born 1948), Pakistan Army brigadier

== See also ==
- Dillon (disambiguation)
