= Karen Ortiz =

American lawyer and judge

- Education: Columbia University; Fordham University
- Occupations: Lawyer, judge

Karen Ortiz is an American lawyer and judge who served as an administrative judge at the Equal Employment Opportunity Commission's (EEOC) New York District Office from 2018 to 2025. She adjudicated employment discrimination cases and gained attention in 2025 for publicly challenging EEOC leadership during the second presidency of Donald Trump over policies affecting LGBTQ+ cases, which ultimately resulted in her being fired from her position.

== Early life and education ==
Karen Ortiz was born to parents who moved from Puerto Rico to the U.S. mainland in the 1950s. She grew up in Garden City, New York. During high school, she participated in mock trial as a U.S. Supreme Court justice, which inspired her to pursue a legal career. Ortiz completed her undergraduate degree at Columbia University. She earned a J.D. at Fordham University School of Law.

== Career ==
Ortiz worked as a legal director for the Metropolitan Transportation Authority. She has been a guest lecturer at John Jay College of Criminal Justice.

In August 2018, Ortiz joined the Equal Employment Opportunity Commission (EEOC) as an administrative judge in the New York District Office. She adjudicated employment discrimination complaints from federal employees on the basis of gender, race, age, and religion. During the 2018–2019 United States federal government shutdown, Ortiz was furloughed for 22 days and was unable to work or receive pay. Due to the timing of her hiring, her benefits had not yet been fully processed, leaving her temporarily without health insurance.

In early 2025, Ortiz became involved in a dispute with EEOC acting chair Andrea R. Lucas following Executive Order 14168 by U.S. president Donald Trump, which limited the government's recognition of gender to two immutable sexes. After administrative judges were directed to pause and send all LGBTQ+ cases to Washington, D.C. for further review, Ortiz objected to the directive and sent an email urging 185 colleagues to resist compliance. When that message was deleted, she sent another email to Lucas, copying over 1,000 employees and questioning her qualifications. Following the email, Ortiz's agency email privileges were revoked and she received a written reprimand. Ortiz later stated that she viewed her actions as whistleblower activity and had hired legal counsel in response to potential professional consequences.

In May 2025, Ortiz was placed on administrative leave pending removal from her position. She was subsequently fired on June 24, 2025. She is running as an independent candidate for the 2026 United States House of Representatives elections in New York on Nov 3rd.

== Personal life ==
Ortiz appeared as herself in the off-off-Broadway comedy show Wack or Woke?.
