= Naomi C. Earp =

American government official (born 1950)

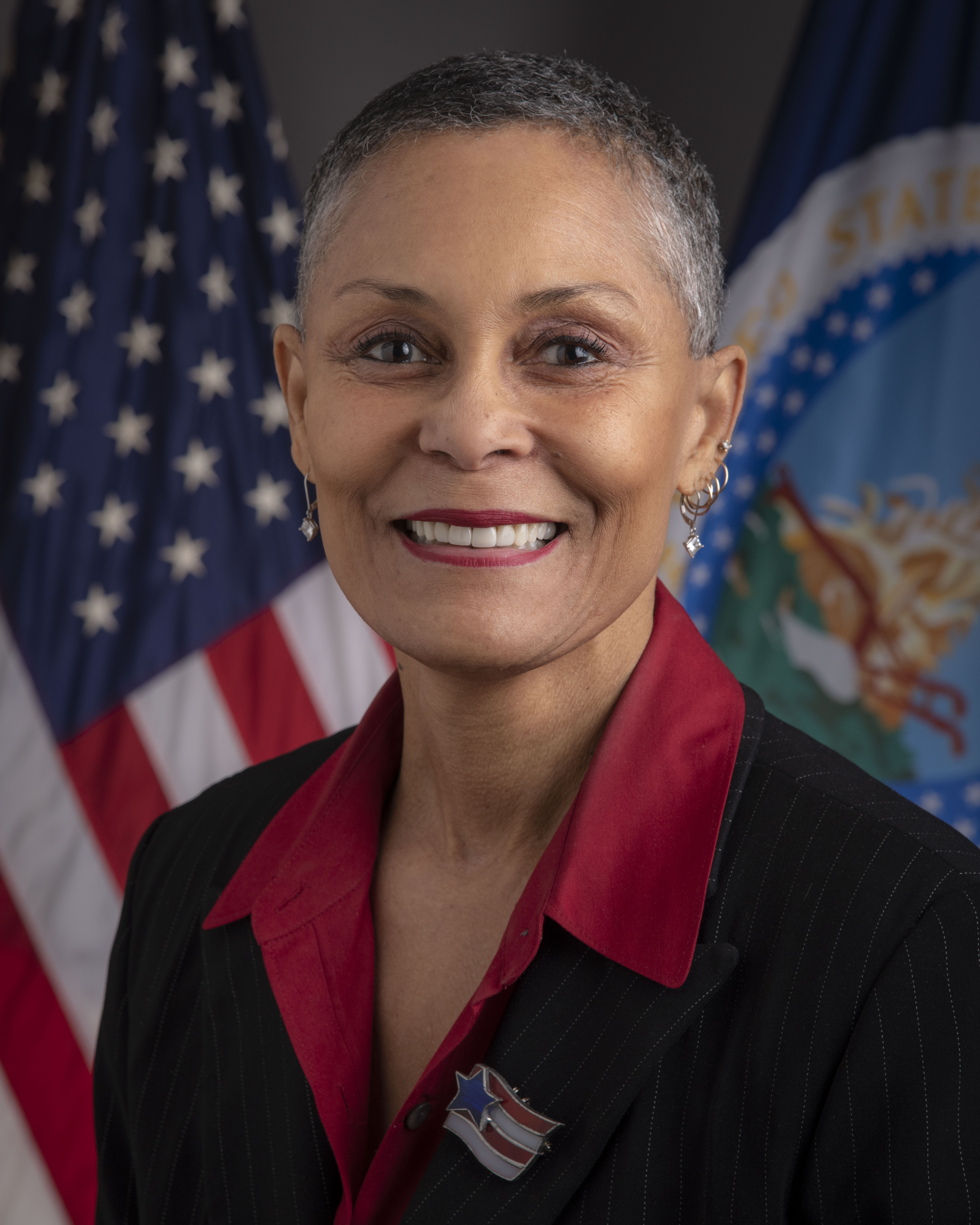

Deputy Assistant Secretary of Agriculture for Civil Rights
- In office January 28, 2019 – January 31, 2020
- President: Donald Trump
- Preceded by: Frederick K. Pfaeffle

Chair of the Equal Employment Opportunity Commission
- In office September 1, 2006 – January 20, 2009
- President: George W. Bush
- Preceded by: Cari M. Dominguez
- Succeeded by: Jacqueline A. Berrien

Commissioner of the Equal Employment Opportunity Commission
- In office 2003–2009
- President: George W. Bush
- Preceded by: Reginald E. Jones
- Succeeded by: Victoria A. Lipnic

Personal details
- Born: Naomi Lois Davis; February 1950 (age 75–76) Newport News, Virginia, U.S.
- Party: Republican
- Spouse: Samuel Earp
- Children: Nathan Earp
- Education: Norfolk State University (BA); Indiana University Bloomington (MS); Catholic University of America (JD)

Naomi Churchill Earp (born February 1950) is an American lawyer and government official from Maryland and Virginia. From 2007 to 2009 she served as chair of the United States Equal Employment Opportunity Commission, where she established the Youth At Work Program. She was designated by President George W. Bush in 2006, succeeding Cari M. Dominguez. Prior to her appointment as Chair, she had served as vice chair of the commission since 2003.

== Early life and education ==
A native of Newport News, Virginia, Ms. Earp received her bachelor's degree from Norfolk State University, Norfolk, Virginia; master's degree from Indiana University Bloomington; and Juris Doctor from Catholic University's Columbus School of Law, Washington, DC. Earp studied social work as an undergraduate, which she credits with inspiring her to go into civil rights advocacy.

Some report she is a member of the Supreme Court Bar and the Pennsylvania Bar, but she is not listed as either an active or inactive member of that bar.

== Federal service ==
Earp began her career as a civil rights specialist for the Economic Development Administration from 1976 to 1979. In 1981, she became an investigator for veterans reemployment rights at the Department of Labor, serving until 1983. From 1985 to 1986, Earp served as an EEO manager for the United States Naval District of Washington. From 1986 to 1987, Earp was attorney for the Equal Employment Opportunity Commission (EEOC) from 1986 to 1987.

Earp joined the United States Department of Agriculture (USDA) in 1987 as Associate Director of the Office of Advocacy and Enterprise, serving in the position until 1990. She served in the Federal Aviation Administration (FAA) as a temporary EEO specialist from 1991 to 1993. In 1994, Earp became Director of the Office of Equal Employment at the National Institutes of Health (NIH), serving in this capacity until 2003.

== EEOC and the Trump Administration ==
=== Equal Employment Opportunity Commission (EEOC) ===
From 2007 to 2009, Earp served as chair of the United States Equal Employment Opportunity Commission, where she established the Youth At Work Program. She was designated by President George W. Bush in 2006, succeeding Cari M. Dominguez. Prior to her appointment as Chair, she had served as vice chair of the commission since 2003. During Earp's tenure as EEOC chair, the agency filed suit against Walgreens over alleged racial discrimination.

=== Post-EEOC career ===
Earp became Director of the Office of Opportunity, Inclusiveness and Compliance at the Library of Congress from 2009 to 2011. She retired from federal service in 2011 and got involved in state service in 2012. From 2012 to 2013 she served as the equal employment opportunity labor relations coordinator and became supervisor of the labor relations division for the city of Memphis, Tennessee. From 2013 to 2014 she served as the Director of the Workforce Investment Network. From 2015 to 2016 she served as Director for Workforce Development at Southwest Tennessee Community College.

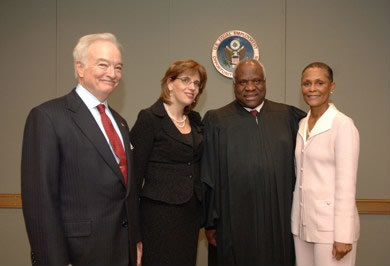
Earp alongside Supreme Court Justice Clarence Thomas

=== Trump Administration ===
On February 13, 2018, U.S. President Donald Trump selected Earp for Assistant Secretary for Civil Rights at the U.S. Department of Agriculture (USDA). While still waiting for Senate confirmation, she was appointed as Deputy Assistant Secretary on January 28, 2019, after taking the oath of office for that subordinate position.

Earp received criticism from members of the Senate for using the term "silliness" to describe sexual harassment. Earp responded by saying "I probably shouldn't have described sexual harassment as 'silliness,' although it is on a continuum". On January 3, 2020, absent a vote in the full Senate, the Senate returned her nomination to the President and, amidst numerous pending EEO complaints and an independent management inquiry, she resigned effective January 31, 2020.

== Personal life ==
Earp is the widow of Samuel Earp, and mother of one son, Nathan.
