= Jenny Yang =

Jenny Yang may refer to:

- Jenny Yang (comedian), American comic and writer
- Jenny R. Yang, director of Federal Contract Compliance Programs at the U.S. Department of Labor
- Jenny Y. Yang, American chemist
