= Chai Feldblum =

American legal scholar and human rights activist (born 1959)

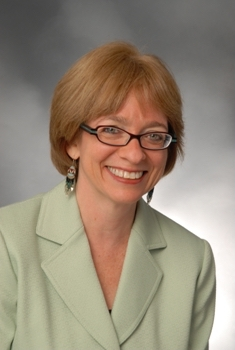
- Official portrait, 2010

Commissioner of the United States AbilityOne Commission (Private Citizen)
- In office July 30, 2021 – January 23, 2025
- President: Joe Biden; Donald Trump
- Preceded by: Robert T. Kelly, Jr.
- Succeeded by: Christina Brandt

Commissioner of the Equal Employment Opportunity Commission
- In office March 27, 2010 – July 1, 2018
- President: Barack Obama; Donald Trump
- Preceded by: Leslie Silverman
- Succeeded by: Charlotte Burrows

Personal details
- Born: April 1959 (age 67) New York City, US
- Education: Barnard College; Harvard University

Chai Rachel Feldblum (born April 1959) is an American legal scholar and activist for disability and LGBT rights who served as a private citizen commissioner for the United States AbilityOne Commission from 2021 to 2025. A member of the Democratic Party, she served as a commissioner of the Equal Employment Opportunity Commission from 2010 to 2018.

== Early life and education ==
Chai Feldblum was born in New York City to Meyer Simcha and Esther Feldblum. Meyer Simcha Feldblum was born in Lithuania and survived the Holocaust by living in the forests of Poland. He came to the United States following WWII, where he earned his ordination and Ph.D. from Yeshiva University in New York City and became a rabbi and a professor of Talmud, first at Yeshiva University and then at Bar Ilan University in Israel. Esther Feldblum received her Ph.D. in Jewish history from Columbia University and taught for one year at Brooklyn College before dying in a car accident at the age of 41. Her dissertation, The American Catholic Press and the Jewish State: 1917–1959, was published as a book posthumously.

Chai Feldblum grew up in Washington Heights in New York City.

Chai Feldblum attended the Yeshiva University High School for Girls in Queens, New York before majoring in Ancient Studies and Religion at Barnard College in the class of 1979. Feldblum received her J.D. from Harvard Law School in 1985.

== Career ==
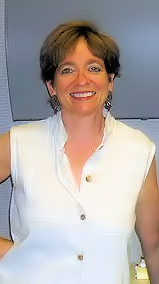
Chai Feldblum, August 2011.

After graduating from law school, Feldblum clerked for federal Judge Frank M. Coffin on the United States Court of Appeals for the First Circuit and then for Justice Harry A. Blackmun on the Supreme Court of the United States.

While working from 1988 to 1990 as Legislative Counsel to the AIDS Project of the American Civil Liberties Union, Feldblum was the lead attorney on the team drafting the Americans with Disabilities Act, which became law in 1990.

She joined the faculty of Georgetown University Law Center in Washington, DC in 1991, teaching classes on "legislative lawyering," a phrase she coined to describe the work of the attorneys who craft or lobby for legislation. She founded and is the director of the university's Federal Legislation Clinic.

In 1993, she was the legal director for the Campaign for Military Service, a group which lobbied to overturn policies forbidding gay and bisexual people from serving openly in the U.S. armed forces. The CMS was the first organization to air a nationwide television commercial on a gay rights issue.

In 2003, Feldblum became co-director of Georgetown's Workplace Flexibility 2010 project, a program developed to improve conditions for employers and employees. The program focused on flexible work arrangements (FWAs), including phased retirement, non-traditional flextime and working time, remote work, and multiple points of exit and re-entry into the workforce.

In 2006, she founded the Moral Values Project, with the mission statement:

We believe that moral values matter in the governing of our polity. And we believe that Americans can articulate, and live up to, a more progressive set of moral values regarding sexuality, sexual orientation and gender equity. Sexuality can be a positive, important force in our lives. Heterosexuality, homosexuality and bisexuality are all morally neutral. But the love that is expressed by those who are straight, gay or bisexual is morally good – and all equally morally good. All forms of gender are morally neutral. But lack of gender equity is morally bad.

She was the lead drafter of the Employment Non-Discrimination Act, which would prohibit employment discrimination based on someone's real or perceived sexual orientation. She also worked on passage of the ADA Amendments Act of 2008, and has testified before Congress on numerous occasions.

=== Equal Employment Opportunity Commission ===
In 2009, President Barack Obama nominated Feldblum for one of the seats on the five-member Equal Employment Opportunity Commission. In response to attacks on her, Obama stated in an October 10 speech to the gay rights group Human Rights Campaign:

Nobody in America should be fired because they're gay, despite doing a great job and meeting their responsibilities. It's not fair, it's not right, we're going to put a stop to it. And it's for this reason if any of my nominees are attacked not for what they believe but for who they are, I will not waver in my support because I will not waver in my commitment to ending discrimination in all its forms.

Following her nomination, Feldblum came under attack on various grounds. In testimony before the United States Senate Committee on Health, Education, Labor, and Pensions, Feldblum testified that claims that she believed in governmental endorsement of polygamy or polyamorous relationships were wrong, consistent with her own writings in which she had always restricted such endorsement to non-sexual domestic partners.

Obama made a recess appointment of Feldblum and three other nominees to the EEOC on March 27, 2010. On December 22, 2010, the U.S. Senate confirmed Feldblum to the seat on the EEOC for a term expiring July 1, 2013. She is openly lesbian and became the first openly LGBT person to serve on the EEOC.

In 2013, Feldblum was nominated by President Obama to serve a second term on the EEOC, expiring on July 1, 2018. On December 9, 2013, Senate Majority Leader Harry Reid filed for cloture on Feldblum's nomination. On December 11, 2013, the Senate voted 57–39 to break the filibuster, paving the way for a final vote on Feldblum's nomination. On December 12, 2013, Feldblum was confirmed to a second term in a 54–41 vote. Feldblum was nominated for a third term on the EEOC by President Donald Trump, but her nomination was blocked by Senator Mike Lee.

=== After the EEOC ===
In March 2019, Feldblum became a partner at the law firm of Morgan, Lewis & Bockius, stating to Bloomberg Law that the move from public service to a "Big Law management-side firm", considered unusual, was the best way to help employers implement the workplace harassment guidelines outlined by herself and Victoria Lipnic at the EEOC. She described the firm as "the place from which to help make that institutional change", of preventing harassment from happening in the workplace. Feldblum left the firm in March 2021, after helping to expand the firm's DEI and respectful workplace practice.

In November 2020, Feldblum was named a volunteer member of the Joe Biden presidential transition Agency Review Team to support transition efforts related to the United States Department of Justice.

=== AbilityOne Commission ===
President Joe Biden appointed Feldblum to the AbilityOne Commission in August 2021 and she was subsequently elected vice chair of the commission. During Feldblum's first year on the commission, she helped develop a new strategic plan for the commission that would modernize the program.

== Personal life ==
Feldblum is a lesbian. She is married to Nan D. Hunter.

== Select bibliography ==
- Sexual Orientation, Morality, and the Law: Devlin Revisited (1996).
- The Federal Gay Civil Rights Bill: From Bella to ENDA in Creating Change: Sexuality, Public Policy, & Civil Rights ( J. D'Emilio, W. Turner & U. Vaid eds. 2000).
- Rectifying the Tilt: Equality Lessons from Religion, Disability, Sexual Orientation and Transgender, University of Maine Law Review (Tenth Annual Coffin Lecture) (2003).
- The Art of Legislative Lawyering and the Six Circles of Legislative Advocacy, 34 McGeorge L. Rev. 785 (2003).
- Gay is Good: The Moral Case for Marriage Equality and More, 17 Yale J.L. & Feminism 139–184 (2005).
- The Definition of Disability in the Americans With Disabilities Act: Its Successes and Shortcomings, 9 Emp. Rts. & Emp. Pol'y J. 473–498 (2005) (co-authored piece).
- Moral Conflict and Liberty: Gay Rights and Religion, 72 Brook. L. Rev. 61-123 (2006).
- The Right to Define One's Own Concept of Existence: What Lawrence Can Mean for Intersex and Transgender People, 7 Geo. J. Gender & L. 115–139 (2006).

== See also ==
- List of law clerks for the second seat of the Supreme Court of the United States
