= Cohen Milstein =

American law firm

- Headquarters: Washington, D.C.
- No. of offices: 8
- No. of attorneys: 100
- Website: www.cohenmilstein.com

Cohen Milstein Sellers & Toll PLLC (often simply known as Cohen Milstein) is an American plaintiffs' law firm that engages in large-scale class action litigation.

The firm filed a number of lawsuits against Donald Trump during and after his presidency, including a lawsuit which successfully blocked the Trump administration's attempt to roll back the Deferred Action for Childhood Arrivals (DACA) program.

== Notable cases ==
=== Civil rights ===
In 2017, in Keepseagle v. Vilsack, a settlement was reached between Native American farmers and the United States Department of Agriculture. The farmers, whose lead law firm was Cohen Milstein, said they had been denied loans for decades because of government discrimination. The farmers were awarded $760 million.

Cohen Milstein represented plaintiffs who sued the Trump administration over the rescission of the Deferred Action for Childhood Arrivals (DACA) program. A federal judge argued that the Trump administration must fully restore DACA, saying the law's rescission was "arbitrary and capricious" and "inadequately explained." The case, Department of Homeland Security v. Regents of the University of California, went before the U.S. Supreme Court, which reversed the Trump administration's order in a win for undocumented immigrants who had entered the U.S. as minors.

In 2020, Cohen Milstein joined the ACLU, the Lawyers' Committee for Civil Rights Under Law, and the Poverty & Race Research Action Council in suing the United States Department of Housing and Urban Development (HUD) over its rollback of portions of the Fair Housing Act. In the lawsuit, Cohen Milstein alleged that HUD had gutted "the long-established legal framework for 'disparate impact' claims, which have helped dismantle systemic barriers to fair housing for decades."

In 2022, Sterling Jewelers paid $175 million to settle a class action arbitration alleging that the company had discriminated against 68,000 women in its pay and promotion practices. Cohen Milstein served as the plaintiffs' lead attorney.

In 2024, U.S. Customs and Border Protection (CBP) reached a settlement with the Equal Employment Opportunity Commission, whereby CBP would pay $45 million to CBP employees who were discriminated against because of their pregnancies. The CBP employees were represented by Cohen Milstein, together with Gilbert Employment Law.

=== Lawsuits against Donald Trump ===
The firm assisted District of Columbia Attorney General Karl Racine and Attorney General of Maryland Brian Frosh in filing a lawsuit accusing President Donald Trump of using his hotel in Washington D.C. to unconstitutionally profit from his political office. D.C. and Maryland v. Trump alleged that Trump had violated the Foreign Emoluments Clause. In January 2021, the Supreme Court of the United States issued a summary disposition ordering the Fourth Circuit to dismiss the case as moot.

In February 2021, on behalf of Democratic U.S. Representative Bennie Thompson, Cohen Milstein and the NAACP filed a lawsuit against former President Trump and Rudy Giuliani over their role in the 2021 United States Capitol attack. The lawsuit alleged that Trump and Giuliani had collaborated and conspired with the white supremacist groups Proud Boys and Oath Keepers to prevent the U.S. Congress from certifying the results of the 2020 presidential election. A number of congressional Democrats signed onto the lawsuit.

=== Securities litigation ===
Alphabet Inc., the parent company of Google, agreed to spend $310 million on DEI initiatives as part of a settlement over a series of sexual harassment and misconduct lawsuits. Alphabet Inc. will be required to start a DEI advisory council.

In a lawsuit against Pinterest board members, Cohen Milstein asked a judge for approval of twice the firm's usual lodestar billing because Pinterest agreed to corporate governance reforms, which Cohen Milstein said would make the firm more diverse and inclusive and therefore enhance its value. A U.S. District Judge denied the firm's $5.4 million fee request and ordered Cohen Milstein "to enforce the settlement terms and police the corporation", assessing "how much progress has actually been made (or not made)." More fees may be paid in the future if the firm is able to convince the judge "how much benefit really flows from the settlement."

In 2023, Wells Fargo paid $1 billion to settle a class action that accused the bank of overstating how much progress it had made in fixing practices flagged by regulators. Wells shareholders were represented by Cohen Milstein.

=== Lawsuits on behalf of state attorneys general ===
Cohen Milstein has a practice area in which it helps state attorneys general with complex litigation. In 2014, The New York Times wrote that Cohen Milstein was part of "a flourishing industry that pairs plaintiffs' lawyers with state attorneys general to sue companies, a collaboration that has set off a furious competition between trial lawyers and corporate lobbyists to influence these officials." The firm has been a major donor to state attorneys general associations, candidates, state party committees, and attorneys general running for governor.

In 2016, the Attorney General of the U.S. Virgin Islands, Claude Walker, authorized the firm to investigate whether ExxonMobil had committed fraud by denying climate change. Cohen Milstein stood to earn as much as 27% percent of any monetary damages generated by the litigation, plus some costs. That arrangement was criticized by Exxon, who sued Cohen Milstein, alleging constitutional violations regarding free speech, due process, and unreasonable searches and seizures.

The firm has represented various states against entities involved in the opioid epidemic.

=== Antitrust ===
The firm sued the National Association of Realtors for inflating real estate broker commissions. A settlement of $418 million was reached in 2024.

Cohen Milstein served as co-lead counsel in In re Urethane Antitrust Litigation, which resulted in an $835 million settlement with Dow Chemical for artificially inflating the price of polyurethane.

=== Flint water crisis ===
Cohen Milstein attorney Ted Leopold served as interim co-lead counsel in In re Flint Water Cases, a class action arising from the Flint water crisis that resulted in a $626 million settlement. The lawsuit was brought on behalf of residents of and businesses in Flint, Michigan against defendants including the State of Michigan and former Michigan Governor Rick Snyder. Relatedly, the firm settled litigation against engineering companies Veolia North America and Lockwood, Andrews & Newnam for their alleged role in the water crisis.

=== Human rights ===
In 2023, ExxonMobil settled a lawsuit brought by villagers in Indonesia who alleged that soldiers hired by the oil company to guard a natural gas facility committed murder and torture. The settlement amount was confidential (as is customary in cases like this). Cohen Milstein represented the villagers.

== Notable alumni ==
The following people have worked at Cohen Milstein:

- Anita Hill, American law professor
- Lina Khan, American legal scholar and former chair of the Federal Trade Commission
- Kalpana Kotagal, American attorney and commissioner of the Equal Employment Opportunity Commission
- Jenny R. Yang, American attorney and former director of the Office of Federal Contract Compliance
