= Jocelyn Samuels =

American lawyer

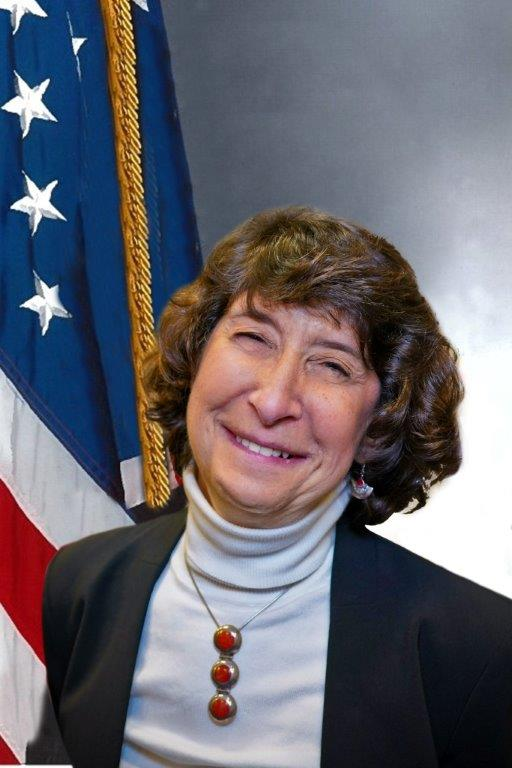
- Official portrait, 2021

Vice Chair of the Equal Employment Opportunity Commission
- In office January 20, 2021 – January 20, 2025
- President: Joe Biden
- Preceded by: Keith Sonderling

Member of the Equal Employment Opportunity Commission
- In office October 14, 2020 – January 27, 2025
- President: Donald Trump; Joe Biden; Donald Trump
- Preceded by: Constance Smith Barker
- Succeeded by: vacant

Director of the U.S. Department of Health and Human Services Office for Civil Rights
- In office August 2014 – January 20, 2017
- President: Barack Obama
- Preceded by: León Rodríguez
- Succeeded by: Roger Severino

United States Assistant Attorney General for the Civil Rights Division
- Acting; July 23, 2013 – August 2014
- President: Barack Obama
- Preceded by: Tom Perez
- Succeeded by: Molly Moran (acting)

Personal details
- Born: Jocelyn Frances Samuels
- Political party: Democratic
- Spouse: Thomas Olson (m. 1983)
- Education: Middlebury College (BA); Columbia University (JD)

Jocelyn Frances Samuels is an American lawyer. Appointed as a member of the Equal Employment Opportunity Commission (EEOC) by Donald Trump in 2020, she was made the commission's vice chair by Joe Biden the following year and served in that role until Biden left office in 2025.

== Donald Trump dismissal ==
Donald Trump dismissed Samuels from the EEOC altogether on January 27, 2025, along with fellow commissioner Charlotte Burrows. Both challenged Trump's authority to remove them before the expiration of their terms and announced that they would be exploring potential legal remedies.

As of October 24, 2025, her lawsuit against Trump, EEOC and its new chair Andrea R. Lucas was stayed by Judge Tanya Chutkan pending on an upcoming Supreme Court decision in Trump v. Slaughter which has the potential to resolve the issues presented by defendants' motion to dismiss.

Political offices
Preceded by Tom Perez	United States Assistant Attorney General for the Civil Rights Division; Acting; 2013–2014	Succeeded by Molly Moran; Acting
Preceded by León Rodríguez	Director of the United States Department of Health and Human Services Office for Civil Rights; 2014–2017	Succeeded by Roger Severino
Preceded by Constance Smith Barker	Member of the Equal Employment Opportunity Commission; 2020–2025	Vacant
Preceded by Keith Sonderling	Vice Chair of the Equal Employment Opportunity Commission; 2021–2025	Vacant
