= Sharon Fast Gustafson =

American attorney

General Counsel of the Equal Employment Opportunity Commission
- In office August 2019 – March 2021
- President: Donald Trump; Joe Biden
- Preceded by: David Lopez
- Succeeded by: Karla Gilbride

Personal details
- Education: Bob Jones University (BA); Georgetown University (JD)

Sharon Fast Gustafson is an American attorney who served as General Counsel of the U.S. Equal Employment Opportunity Commission (EEOC) from 2019 to 2021.

== Early life and education ==
Gustafson earned a BA in English from Bob Jones University in 1980. She then graduated with honors from Georgetown Law Center in 1991.

== Advocacy ==
Gustafson specializes in employment law, primarily representing employees with discrimination and benefits claims. She successfully litigated the 2015 pregnancy discrimination case Young v. United Parcel Service to the U.S. Supreme Court. She served as counsel for Peggy Young, the case's plaintiff, for eight years. According to the Harvard Business Review, the ruling makes it "significantly more likely that pregnant women denied workplace accommodations will succeed in their legal claims against the employers who denied them."

== Equal Employment Opportunity Commission (EEOC) ==
=== Nomination and tenure ===
Gustafson was confirmed as General Counsel of the EEOC by the United States Senate on August 1, 2019. Several advocacy organizations including the Human Rights Campaign and the Leadership Conference on Civil and Human Rights opposed her nomination citing that she would be "unwilling or reluctant to preserve the EEOC’s critical mission of defending LGBT people." During a confirmation hearing before the Senate Health, Education, Labor, and Pensions Committee, she refused to answer whether she believes that discriminating against LGBT workers is a form of unlawful sex bias per the 1964 Civil Rights Act.

Her tenure was characterized by prioritizing fighting religious discrimination in the workplace.

On March 5, President Joe Biden fired Gustafson from her EEOC post. Her Senate-confirmed term had originally been set to run through 2023. The White House had requested her resignation on March 2, and terminated her formally upon her refusal to do so.

Her termination was opposed by the Faith and Freedom Coalition, a conservative political advocacy organization that opposes abortion and same-sex marriage. Conservative writer Rod Dreher called the move a "blow to religious liberty." Biden's decision was praised by liberal observers.

Republican Congresswoman Virginia Foxx alleged that Gustafson's firing constituted "partisan warfare." Trump-appointed EEOC Commissioner Andrea Lucas added that the move threatened the "independence" of the agency. Conversely, Gustafson's predecessor David Lopez countered that in fact it was Gustafson who was violating established norms by not resigning, and that presidents have latitude to choose people for senior roles at the commission.
