= Bryan L. Jarrett =

American lawyer

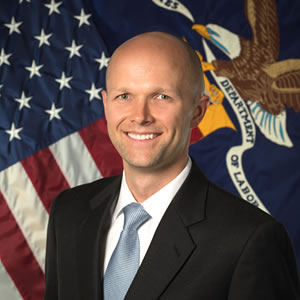

Deputy Administrator Wage and Hour Division at the United States Department of Labor
- In office October 2017 – January 2019
- President: Donald Trump
- Preceded by: Laura Fortman
- Succeeded by: Keith Sonderling

Acting Administrator of the Wage and Hour Division at the United States Department of Labor
- In office October 2017 – January 2019
- President: Donald Trump
- Preceded by: David Weil
- Succeeded by: Keith Sonderling

Personal details
- Education: Brigham Young University (BA); Stanford Law School (JD)

Bryan L. Jarrett is an American attorney and former government official. He served as the Acting and Deputy Administrator of the Wage and Hour Division of the United States Department of Labor from October 2017 to January 2019. Prior to joining the Wage and Hour Division, Jarrett was a labor and employment attorney at Morgan, Lewis & Bockius and Jones Day. He also clerked on the United States Court of Appeals for the Eighth Circuit. Jarrett graduated summa cum laude with a B.A. from Brigham Young University and graduated with Pro Bono Distinction and a J.D. from Stanford Law School.
