= Kalpana Kotagal =

American attorney

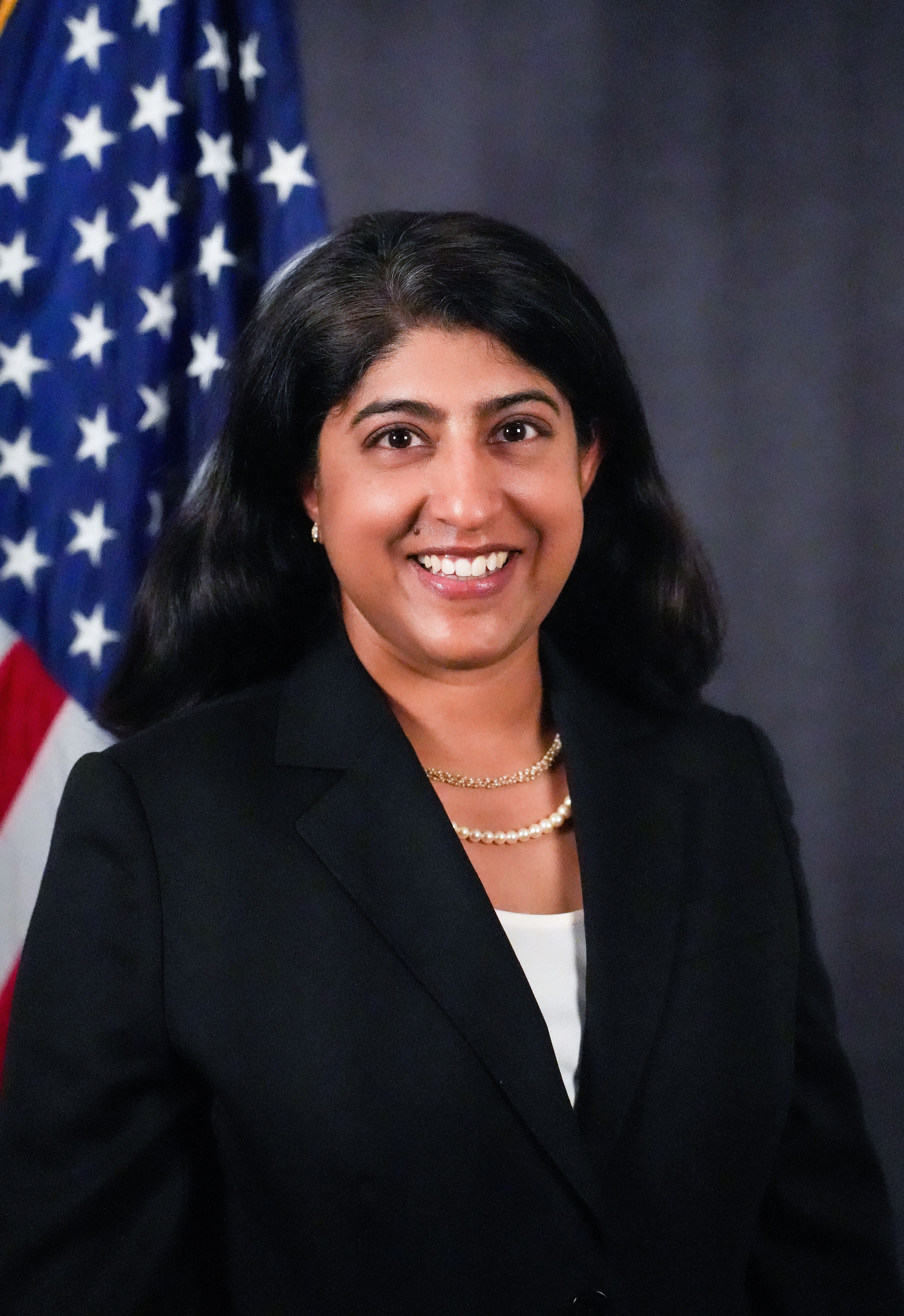

Commissioner of the Equal Employment Opportunity Commission
- Incumbent
- Assumed office August 9, 2023
- President: Joe Biden; Donald Trump
- Preceded by: Janet Dhillon

Personal details
- Party: Democratic
- Children: 2
- Education: Stanford University (BA, BS); University of Pennsylvania (JD)

Kalpana Kotagal is an American employment attorney who is a commissioner of the Equal Employment Opportunity Commission.

== Education ==
Kotagal earned a dual Bachelor of Science and Bachelor of Arts degree from Stanford University and a Juris Doctor from the University of Pennsylvania Law School in 2005.

== Career ==
Kotagal served as a law clerk for Judge Betty Binns Fletcher. She later joined Cohen Milstein, where she has since worked as a partner. Kotagal was also a Wasserstein Public Interest Fellow at Harvard Law School. She specializes in employment law, Title VII, the Equal Pay Act of 1963, and diversity, equity, and inclusion. Kotagal is also known for co-creating the concept of the inclusion rider, a legal stipulation that has become a notable inclusion in entertainment industry contracts.

Kotagal has represented workers in civil rights and employment class actions, including litigation against Sterling Jewelers alleging gender bias in pay and promotions and litigation against AT&T Mobility alleging pregnancy discrimination. She also represented female Walmart employees in Dukes v. Wal-Mart, and has continued to represent workers in individual cases against Walmart.

In 2021, Kotagal and the Transgender Legal Defense and Education Fund concluded negotiations with Aetna that ensured access to breast augmentation surgery for transfeminine policyholders.

Kotagal frequently writes and speaks on diversity, equity, and inclusion topics for general audiences. Her articles have appeared in outlets including The Washington Post, The Hill, and Refinery29. She appeared in the 2018 documentary film This Changes Everything.

Kotagal serves on the advisory board of University of Pennsylvania Law School's Office of Equity & Inclusion, as well as the board of directors of public interest legal organizations A Better Balance and Public Justice.

== EEOC confirmation ==
In April 2022, Kotagal was nominated to be a commissioner of the EEOC to replace Republican commissioner Janet Dhillon. Her nomination was held up because it was deadlocked in the Senate’s Health, Labor, Education, and Pensions Committee; but the 1 seat majority Democrats secured in 2023 allowed her nomination to move out of committee by a 1-vote margin. Because Sen. Joe Manchin (D-WV) opposed her nomination, the vote to invoke cloture to allow her nomination to proceed was tied at 50-50, and Vice President Kamala Harris had to break the tie, thus tying the record for the most tie-breaking votes ever cast by vice-president. Manchin opposed her nomination because “Ms. Kotagal does not represent West Virginia values and would prioritize a partisan agenda over creating commonsense, bipartisan solutions that bring our nation forward,” he said. Republicans also unanimously opposed her nomination. Sen. Ted Cruz (R-TX) wrote "Based on Kotagal’s record I think she will use her position to attack religious liberty and force her politics on Texas companies." Her addition as an EEOC Commissioner gave Democrats a majority on the five-member panel.

== Personal life ==
Kotagal lives in Cincinnati with her husband, Wyatt King, and two sons.
