= PATCOB =

PATCOB (Professional, Administrative, Technical, Clerical, Other white collar, and Blue collar) are occupational categories established by Equal Employment Opportunity Commission (EEOC). They are used for statistical reporting on data collected by the United States Census Bureau, employer reports or federal agencies.

The approximately 420 federal employee Occupational Specialty Codes from the United States Office of Management and Budget are characterized into one of these categories by the EEOC for statistical reporting and evaluation of affirmative action programs. For workers outside the government, the civilian labor force is characterized by the federal code that closest matches their job title.

The categories may be roughly described as follows:

- Professional - occupations with matching 4-year or higher degree with major in that area. (e.g. doctor, lawyer, accountant, biologist, chemist, engineer)
- Administrative - occupations in fields of management or administrative involving significant levels of analysis, judgement and responsibility. (e.g. organization head, program manager, budget analyst)
- Technical - occupations typically supportive of professional or administrative which is non-routine and uses practical knowledge and experience/training below bachelor's degree level.(e.g. computer technician, budget assistant, personnel assistant)
- Clerical - occupations supportive of office or business which is routine and structured. (e.g. secretary, receptionist)
- Other - Occupations that cannot be otherwise attributed (e.g. security guards, training programs)
- Blue Collar - Occupations in a recognized trade or craft, typically Wage Grade or Union. (e.g. driver, plumber, heavy equipment operator)

In 2004, EEOC changed to nine occupational categories: officials and managers, professionals, technicians, sales, office and clerical, craft workers, operatives, laborers, and service workers.
