= Ida L. Castro =

American attorney and government official

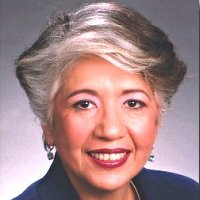

Chair of the Equal Employment Opportunity Commission
- In office October 23, 1998 – August 13, 2001
- President: Bill Clinton
- Preceded by: Paul Igasaki (acting)
- Succeeded by: Cari M. Dominguez

Personal details
- Born: 1953 (age 71–72); New York City, New York, U.S.
- Political party: Democratic
- Education: University of Puerto Rico (BA); Rutgers University (MA, JD)

Ida L. Castro (born 1953) is an American attorney and government official who served as Chair of the Equal Employment Opportunity Commission (EEOC) from October 23, 1998, to August 13, 2001.

== Early life and education ==
Castro was born in New York City. She earned a Bachelor of Arts degree from the University of Puerto Rico, a Master of Arts in Labor Studies from Rutgers University, and a Juris Doctor from Rutgers Law School in 1982.

== Career ==
Castro is licensed to practice law in New York and New Jersey. Prior to joining the EEOC, Castro served as the acting director of the United States Women's Bureau from 1996 to 1998. She also served at United States Department of Labor as deputy assistant secretary and director of the Office of Workers' Compensation Programs from 1994 to 1996.

Castro worked as a labor and employment lawyer and a professor. She was the first woman to earn tenure as an associate professor at the Rutgers University Institute for Management and Labor Relations. During her career as an attorney, she served as Senior Legal Counsel for Legal Affairs of NYC Health + Hospitals, Special Counsel to the President and Director of Labor Relations at Hostos Community College, Associate counsel at Eisner, Levy, Pollack and Ratner, and Associate Counsel at Giblin and Giblin. Castro, representing the New Jersey Public Advocate's Office was a member of the litigation team on the Abbott v. Burke case.

After leaving the Clinton Administration, Castro served as Commissioner of the New Jersey Civil Service Commission from 2002 through 2004, appointed by Governor Jim McGreevey. She also served as the Director of the Democratic National Committee's Women’s Vote Center.

She was a visiting professor at the CUNY School of Law, where she served as the Haywood Burns Chair. In 2005, Castro established her own consulting firm specializing on Diversity Management. She then became Vice President of Government Affairs, a founding executive, at V-ME Television, and helped establish a national television network in Spanish designed to provide high quality programs to the Spanish-speaking audience. Since 2008 she serves as a founding executive the Geisinger Commonwealth School of Medicine in Scranton, Pennsylvania, where she serves as Vice President of Government and Community Relations and Chief Diversity Officer.

Castro serves on the Scranton Area Community Foundation Board and chairs their Human Resources Committee. She also is a founder of Women in Philanthropy, a foundation initiative to increase engaged philanthropy for the benefit of women and girls in northeast Pennsylvania. Castro also serves on the Greater Wilkes-Barre, Pennsylvania Chamber of Commerce and chairs its nomination committee. In addition, Castro chaired the Employment Opportunity Training Center Board from 2013 to 2015 and is a member of the board of United Neighborhood Center in Scranton, Pennsylvania.
