= Karla Gilbride =

American attorney and civil rights litigator

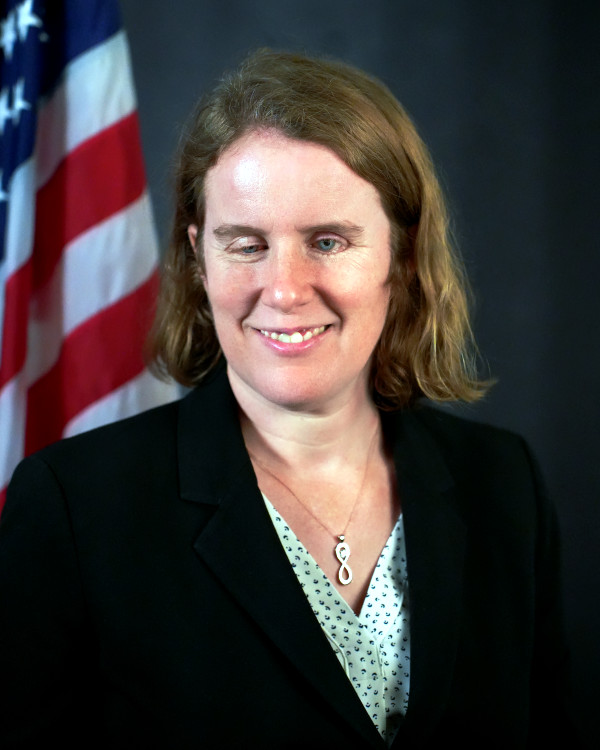

General Counsel of the Equal Employment Opportunity Commission
- In office October 23, 2023 – January 27, 2025
- President: Joe Biden; Donald Trump
- Preceded by: Sharon Fast Gustafson
- Succeeded by: vacant

Personal details
- Education: Swarthmore College (BA); Georgetown University (JD)

Karla Gilbride is an American attorney and civil rights litigator who is the former General Counsel of the U.S. Equal Employment Opportunity Commission (EEOC). Gilbride is the first individual with a known disability to serve as the General Counsel of the EEOC, and holds the distinction of being the first blind lawyer to argue before the Supreme Court.

== Early life and education ==
Gilbride graduated from Swarthmore College, where she earned a Bachelor of Arts in linguistics in 2002 with highest honors. Her undergraduate thesis was titled, "The Relationship Between Infant-Directed Prosody and Indices of Lexical Acquisition at 15 Months of Age." She then graduated from Georgetown University Law Center in 2007 with her Juris Doctor.

After law school, Gilbride clerked for Judge Ronald Gould on the U.S. Court of Appeals for the Ninth Circuit.

== Advocacy ==
Gilbride argued Morgan v. Sundance before the Supreme Court of the United States successfully with the court ruling in Gilbride's client's favor 9–0, overruling the Eighth Circuit. Slate Magazine described Gilbride's performance as “one of those rare arguments in which you can hear an advocate changing the court's mind in real time.”

== Equal Employment Opportunity Commission (EEOC) ==
=== Nomination and tenure ===
On January 3, 2023, President Joe Biden announced his nomination of Gilbride to fill the chief legal post at the EEOC, a post which had been vacant for the prior 22-months following Biden's removal of Trump-appointed Sharon Gustafson. The Senate confirmed Gilbride by a vote of 50–46 on October 17.

On April 24, 2024, the EEOC announced that DHL, a transport and logistics provider, would pay a $8.7 million settlement to a group of 83 Black employees in an anti-discrimination case. In the lawsuit filed in September 2010 in the U.S. District Court for the Northern District of Illinois, the EEOC charged that the company assigned Black employees to more difficult and more dangerous routes than white employees. The settlement was the largest announced by the EEOC since March 2022. Gilbride said in an EEOC statement that "telling Black workers that their lives and their safety concerns are valued less than the lives and concerns of their white coworkers... is plainly unlawful."

== American Civil Liberties Union's Disability Rights Program ==
Gilbride currently serves as the Deputy Director of the American Civil Liberties Union's Disability Rights Program.
