= Paul Igasaki =

American lawyer

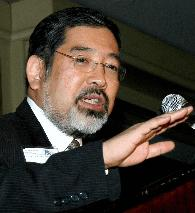

Chair of the Equal Employment Opportunity Commission
- Acting; January 1, 1998 – October 23, 1998
- President: Bill Clinton
- Preceded by: Gilbert F. Casellas
- Succeeded by: Ida L. Castro

Personal details
- Born: July 25, 1955 (age 70)
- Party: Democratic
- Spouse: Louann Igasaki
- Education: Northwestern University (BA); University of California, Davis (JD)

Paul M. Igasaki (born July 25, 1955) was the Chair and Chief Judge of the Administrative Review Board at the U.S. Department of Labor. Previously he was the Deputy Chief Executive Officer of Equal Justice Works, a national organization that advances public interest law through fellowships, loan repayment programs, pro bono programs, conferences and other methods. Prior to joining Equal Justice Works, he was executive director of the Rights Working Group, a unique nationwide coalition of groups and individuals committed to ensuring liberty and justice for all.

== Biography ==
Igasaki served as a consultant on equal employment, diversity, legal services, government, and community affairs matters. Clients included the Epilepsy Foundation, Southeast Asian Research Action Center, U.S. Army, and U.S. Air Force.

Igasaki served as vice chair, chair, and commissioner of the U.S. Equal Employment Opportunity Commission from 1994 until 2002. Noted for his management overhaul of the Commission’s case handling system, his initiatives streamlined the process and eliminated the crippling case backlog. Under his leadership, Igasaki moved the Commission to protect the rights of all Americans, regardless of immigration status and he participated in the development of the Americans with Disabilities Act and the establishment of sexual and racial harassment standards in the United States. Igasaki represented the Commission in the announcement and settlement of the landmark Mitsubishi Motors of America case, which involved the largest discrimination award for sexual harassment.

Prior to his appointment to the Commission by President Bill Clinton, Igasaki was the executive director of the Asian Law Caucus in San Francisco, the nation’s first Asian Pacific American civil rights legal organization. He also served as staff to the late Rep. Robert Matsui’s campaign for the U.S. Senate in California and as a lobbyist and representative for the Japanese American Citizens League, where he worked on funding for the World War II Japanese American redress claims, immigration reform, and the Civil Rights Acts of 1989-91.

Early in his career, Igasaki served as liaison to Asian Americans for the late Chicago Mayor Harold Washington and as counsel to the Chicago Commission on Human Relations. Prior to that he was director of an American Bar Association project to increase resources for civil legal services for the poor. In Sacramento, California, he was awarded a Reginald Heber Smith Fellowship to serve as a staff attorney with Legal Services of Northern California representing poor clients on housing, domestic violence, consumer and other matters. He also served as a graduate legal assistant with the chairman of the California Agricultural Labor Relations Board.

A graduate of Niles West High School (1973), Northwestern University (1976), and the University of California, Davis School of Law (King Hall) (1979), Mr. Igasaki is licensed to practice law in Illinois and California. He was the chair of the American Bar Association’s Individual Rights and Responsibilities Section, the first Asian American to hold that position and has held numerous other ABA posts. He is a member of the board of the Human Rights Center. He was a principal founder of the Chicago Asian American Bar Association and a founder of the National Asian Pacific American Bar Association.

=== Awards ===
Igasaki received distinguished alumni awards from UC Davis - King Hall School of Law and Northwestern University. In 2010, he delivered the commencement address at King Hall Law School in Davis, California. He has been honored for his civil rights work by the Mexican American Legal Defense and Education Fund, the American Arab Anti-Discrimination Committee, and the Sikh Coalition. Igasaki received an honorary law degree from the CUNY Queens Law School, the Outstanding Public Interest Advocate from the National Association for Public Interest Law, the Spirit of Excellence Award from the ABA, the Trailblazer Award from NAPABA, the Japanese American of the Biennium Award from the JACL, the Judge Sandra Otaka "Making History" Award from the Asian American Action Fund of Chicago, the Community Service Award from the Asian Pacific American Bar Association Educational Fund in Washington, D.C. and the Milestone Makers Award from the Asian American Institute in Chicago.

=== Other ===
Igasaki lives in Alexandria, Virginia with his wife and his daughter Aiko. His wife Louann Igasaki is a retired Administrative Appeals Judge with the Social Security Administration. He has been a member of the Alexandria Democratic Committee. He was a member of the National Leadership Council of Asian Americans and Pacific Islanders for Barack Obama.

A historical connection to his career in civil rights, Igasaki is related to Fred Oyama, a United States citizen who was denied the ability to own land, challenged the California Alien Land Laws at United States Supreme Court in 1948 in Oyama v. California under the premise that he was denied equal protection of the laws and of his privileges as an American citizen. The land in the case was transferred from Igasaki's aunt June Kushino who held the land on behalf of Igasaki's grandfather, an Issei or first generation immigrant then ineligible for citizenship, to Fred Oyama who held the land for his father Kajiro Oyama. The case was successfully argued by former Truman Administration Secretary of State Dean Acheson. Both Igasaki and Acheson's daughter Eldie Acheson served in the Clinton Administration.

== See also ==
- List of Asian American jurists
