= Charlotte Burrows =

American politician

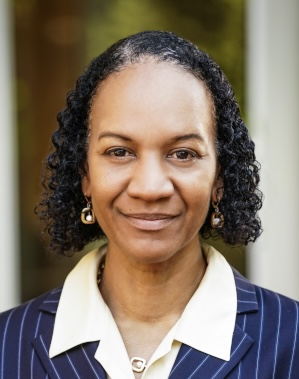
- Official portrait, 2021

Chair of the Equal Employment Opportunity Commission
- In office January 20, 2021 – January 20, 2025
- President: Joe Biden
- Preceded by: Janet Dhillon
- Succeeded by: Andrea R. Lucas

Commissioner of the Equal Employment Opportunity Commission
- In office July 1, 2018 – January 27, 2025
- President: Donald Trump; Joe Biden; Donald Trump
- Preceded by: Chai Feldblum
- Succeeded by: vacant
- In office January 13, 2015 – July 1, 2018
- President: Barack Obama; Donald Trump
- Preceded by: Jacqueline Berrien
- Succeeded by: Keith Sonderling

Personal details
- Party: Democratic
- Education: Princeton University (BA); Yale University (JD)

Charlotte A. Burrows is an American attorney and government official. From 2021 to 2025, Burrows served as Chair of the Equal Employment Opportunity Commission (EEOC). Burrows first joined the agency as a commissioner in 2015, and previously served as an associate deputy attorney general. A member of the Democratic Party, Burrows also served as an aide and counsel to Senator Ted Kennedy.

== Early life and education ==
Burrows is the daughter of Rodney Burrows, a professor of political science. Burrows graduated from Princeton University in 1992, and is a member of the Association of Black Princeton Alumni (ABPA). Burrows later attended Yale Law School, where she received a Juris Doctor in 1996.

== Legal and early government career ==
After graduating from law school, Burrows became a clerk for Judge Timothy K. Lewis of the U.S. Court of Appeals for the Third Circuit. While in private practice, Burrows was an associate at Debevoise & Plimpton.

Burrows was a top aide to Senator Ted Kennedy Senate's Health, Education, Labor and Pensions (HELP) Committee as well as the Senate Judiciary Committee. During her time on Capitol Hill, Burrows worked on legislation including the Lilly Ledbetter Fair Pay Act of 2009 and 2008 amendments to the Americans with Disabilities Act (ADA).

Burrows served within the Department of Justice (DOJ) Civil Rights Division's Employment Litigation Section. In 2009, Burrows became an associate deputy attorney general within the DOJ.

== Equal Employment Opportunity Commission (EEOC) ==
=== Nomination and tenure ===
On September 12, 2014, President Barack Obama announced that Burrows would be nominated to replace Jacqueline A. Berrien on the Equal Employment Opportunity Commission (EEOC). Burrows was confirmed by the Senate by a 93–2 vote, and took office on January 13, 2015. As a member of the EEOC in 2018, Burrows urged Congress to pass the proposed Paycheck Fairness Act.

=== EEOC Chair ===
On January 20, 2021, Burrows was chosen by President Joe Biden to serve as chair of the EEOC, replacing Republican Janet Dhillon. During her tenure as chair, Burrows has indicated that pay equity will be a top priority of the agency. Burrows has also indicated interest in strengthening agency guidances related to protecting caregivers.

As chair, Burrows issued guidelines stating that "employers may not deny an employee equal access to a bathroom, locker room, or shower that corresponds to the employee’s gender identity." In order for the agency to operate more efficiently, Burrows has pushed for the hiring of 450 full-time EEOC employees.

== Donald Trump dismissal ==
Donald Trump dismissed Burrows from the EEOC altogether on January 27, 2025. No president has ever fired an EEOC commissioner, yet Trump fired Burrows and Jocelyn Samuels simultaneously.
