= Inclusion rider =

Contractual provision regarding diversity in media

An inclusion rider or equity rider is a provision in an actor's or filmmaker's contract that provides for a certain level of diversity in casting and production staff. For example, the rider might require a certain proportion of actors or staff to be women, people of color, LGBT people or people with disabilities. Prominent actors or filmmakers may use their negotiating power to insist on such provisions. The term is derived from the "rider", a provision in the contract of performing actors to ensure certain aspects of a performance such as personal amenities or technical infrastructure.

== History ==
The idea was developed by Stacy L. Smith, a professor at the USC Annenberg School for Communication and Journalism, in a 2014 op-ed for The Hollywood Reporter and in her 2016 TED talk. Together with film executive Fanshen Cox DiGiovanni and attorney Kalpana Kotagal Smith created a template for an inclusion rider.

Inclusion riders became more widely known at the 2018 Academy Awards, when actress Frances McDormand said at the end of her Best Actress acceptance speech, "I have two words to leave with you tonight, ladies and gentlemen: inclusion rider!"

Still, in June 2019, the New York Times reported that inclusion riders remained rarely used, although studios pursued other diversity policies. In March 2018, Netflix CEO Reed Hastings declined to adopt an inclusion rider for Netflix productions.

== Use ==
The following people or institutions have committed to using inclusion riders or inclusion policies:

Filmmakers

- Ben Affleck
- Matt Damon
- Paul Feig
- Michael B. Jordan
- Brie Larson

=== Musicians ===
- Salute

Talent agencies

- William Morris Endeavor

Entertainment companies

- Warner Bros. Discovery: The first film made with an inclusion rider is Just Mercy (2019).
