= Uttam Dhillon =

American lawyer (born 1960)

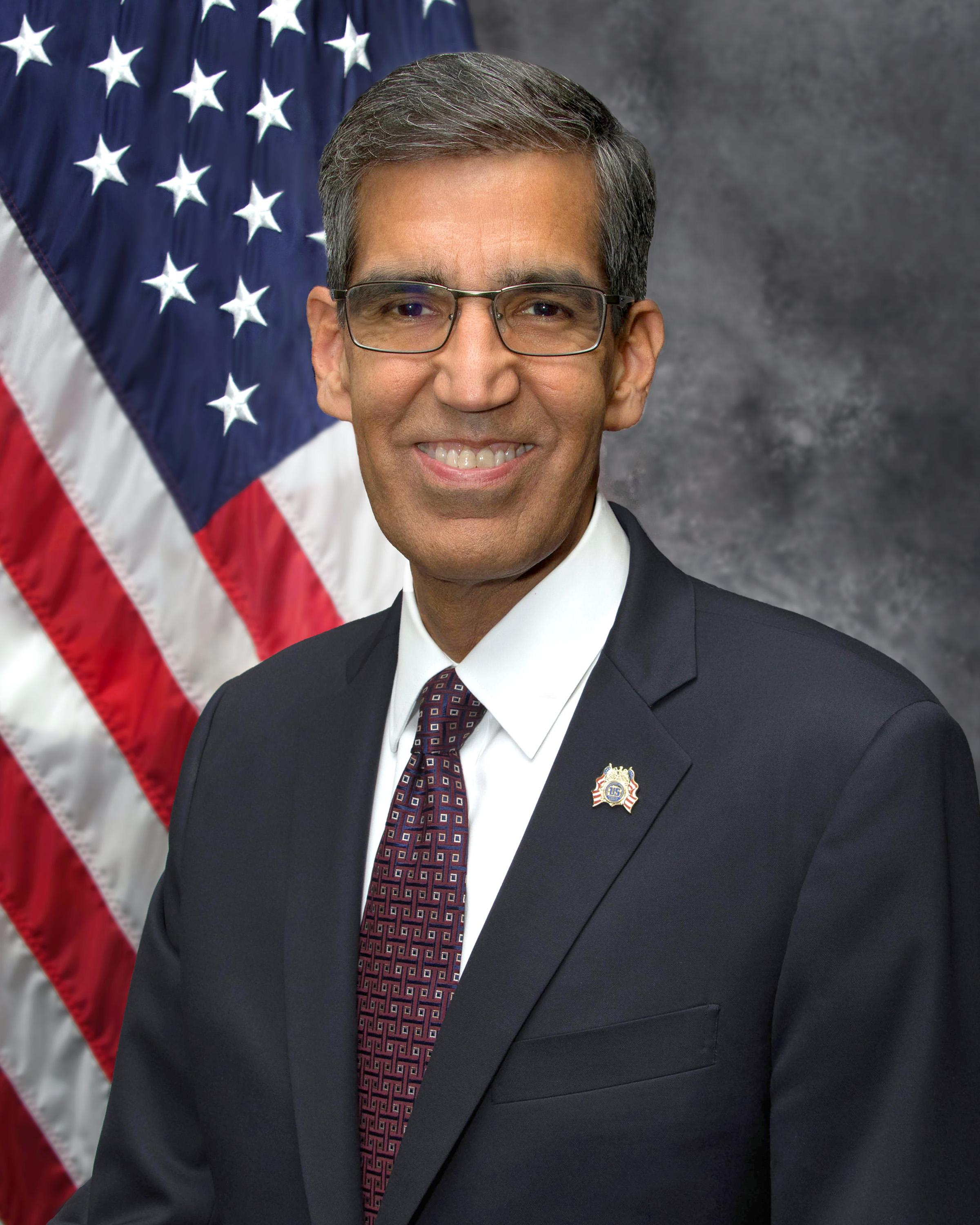

Acting Administrator of the Drug Enforcement Administration
- In office July 2, 2018 – May 18, 2020
- President: Donald Trump
- Preceded by: Robert W. Patterson (acting)
- Succeeded by: Timothy Shea (acting)

Personal details
- Born: Uttam Anthony Singh Dhillon; September 4, 1960 (age 65) El Centro, California, U.S.
- Spouse: Janet Dhillon
- Education: California State University, Sacramento (BA); University of California, San Diego (MA); University of California, Berkeley (JD)

Uttam Anthony Singh Dhillon (born September 4, 1960) is an American attorney and law enforcement official who served as Acting Administrator of the Drug Enforcement Administration from July 2, 2018, to May 18, 2020. He is married to Janet Dhillon, a former commissioner of the Equal Employment Opportunity Commission.

== Early life and education ==
Dhillon was born in El Centro, California to Punjabi parents. He received a Bachelor of Arts degree in psychology from California State University, Sacramento, a Master of Arts in psychology from the University of California, San Diego, and a Juris Doctor from the UC Berkeley School of Law.

== Career ==
From 1990 to 1997, Dhillon served as an Assistant U.S. Attorney in Los Angeles, where he prosecuted major narcotics cases. Dhillon was appointed to the United States Department of Justice's Organized Crime Drug Enforcement Task Force. As part of the task force, he coordinated with federal, state, and local law enforcement agencies to direct investigations of violent gangs and major narcotics trafficking organizations.

Following his time in California, Dhillon served as a senior investigative counsel for the United States House Committee on Oversight and Reform from 1997 to 1998, and the policy director for the House Republican Policy Committee in 2002. In 2003, he served as chief counsel and deputy staff director of the United States House Committee on Homeland Security. In 2006, Dhillon became the first director of the Office of Counternarcotics Enforcement at the United States Department of Homeland Security.

Dhillon worked with President Donald Trump as deputy counsel and deputy assistant to the president. In 2018, Dhillon was appointed as the acting administrator of the Drug Enforcement Administration. He resigned his position to take another DOJ role in May 2020.

In July 2020, Dhillon was selected to serve as the director of Interpol's Washington, D.C. Bureau.
