= Jacqueline A. Berrien =

American civil rights attorney and government official

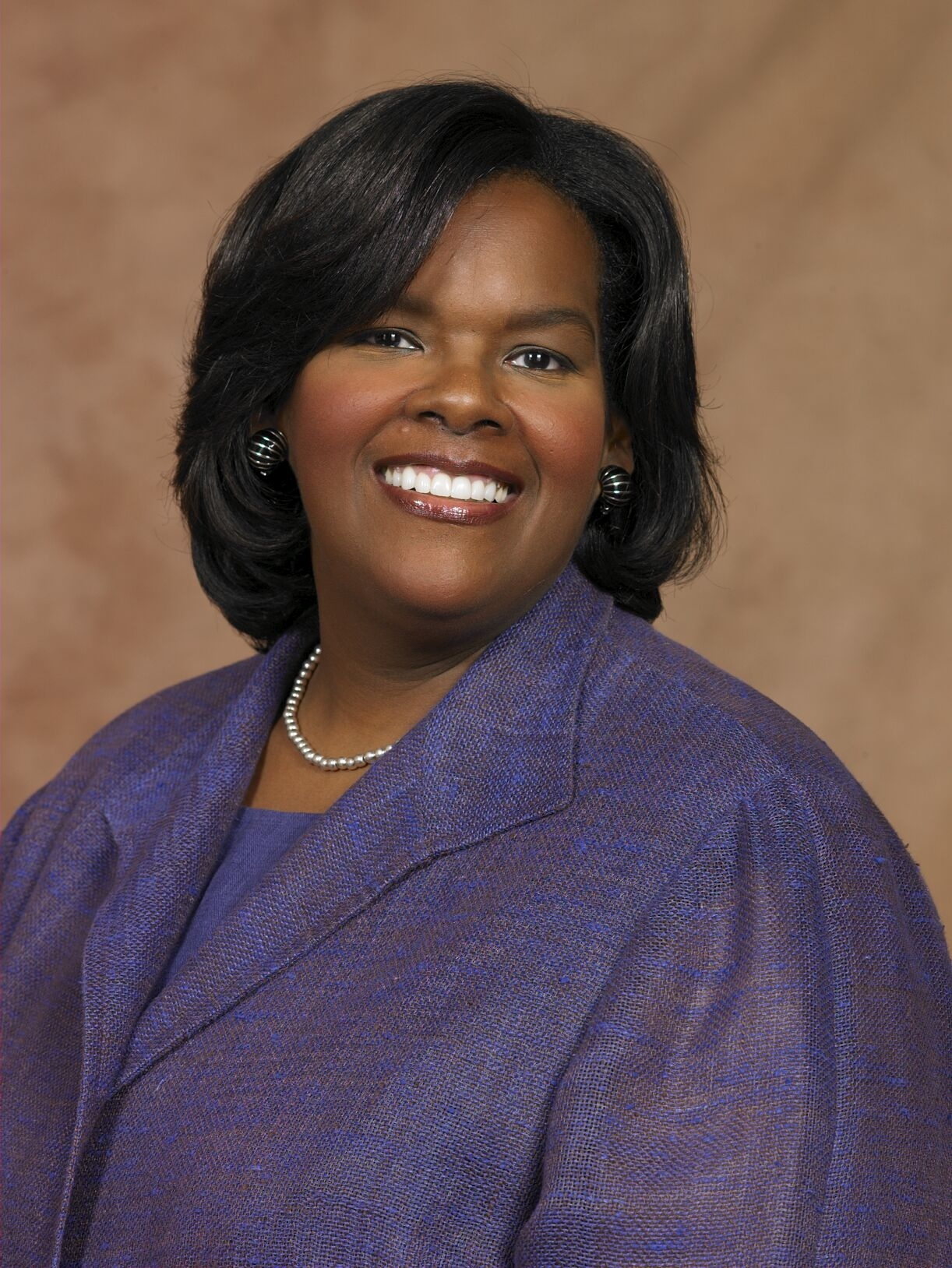

Chair of the Equal Employment Opportunity Commission
- In office April 7, 2010 – September 2, 2014
- President: Barack Obama
- Preceded by: Naomi C. Earp
- Succeeded by: Jenny R. Yang

Member of the Equal Employment Opportunity Commission
- In office April 7, 2010 – 2014
- Preceded by: Christine Griffin
- Succeeded by: Charlotte Burrows

Personal details
- Born: Jacqueline Ann Berrien; November 28, 1961 Washington, D.C., U.S.
- Died: November 9, 2015 (aged 53) Baltimore, Maryland, U.S.
- Spouse: Peter M. Williams
- Education: Oberlin College (BA); Harvard University (JD)

Jacqueline Ann Berrien (November 28, 1961 – November 9, 2015), often known as Jackie Berrien, was an American civil rights attorney and government official. From 2009 to 2014, Berrien served as chair of the Equal Employment Opportunity Commission (EEOC) under President Barack Obama. Prior to this, Berrien had served as Associate Director Counsel for the NAACP Legal Defense and Educational Fund (NAACP LDF).

== Early life and education ==
Berrien was born on November 28, 1961, in Washington, D.C., where she was raised. Her mother, Ann Berrien, was a nurse who was a federal employee for three decades. Her father, Clifford Berrien, was a veteran of World War II who later worked for the Department of State to pay his college tuition. While a high school senior, Berrien became a clerk-typist for the federal government to afford to go to college.

Berrien attended Oberlin College, receiving a Harry S. Truman Scholarship in her junior year. While at Oberlin, Berrien would become close friends with future Representative Yvette Clarke, who spoke on her behalf during her Senate nomination. Berrien graduated from Oberlin with high honors in government in 1983 and would later serve as a trustee for the college.

Berrien would go on to attend Harvard Law School, graduating in 1986. At Harvard, Berrien was general editor of the Harvard Civil Rights-Civil Liberties Law Review. After graduating from law school, Berrien became a clerk for U. W. Clemon, the first African-American to serve as a District Court judge.

== Career ==
=== Legal career ===
Berrien joined the NAACP Legal Defense Fund (NAACP LDF) as assistant counsel in 1994 with a focus on voting rights and school desegregation. Berrien also worked for the American Civil Liberties Union (ACLU) in the Women's Rights Project, as well as the Lawyers' Committee for Civil Rights Under Law. As an academic, Berrien taught at Harvard Law School, her alma mater, and New York Law School.

From 2001 to 2004, Berrien was a program officer for the Ford Foundation, overseeing grants to often under-represented groups in the area of peace and justice.

=== Equal Employment Opportunity Commission (EEOC) ===
Berrien was selected by President Barack Obama to serve as chair of the Equal Employment Opportunity Commission in 2009. During her tenure, Berrien worked closely with the White House Equal Pay Enforcement Task Force to combat the gender pay gap. As chair of the EEOC, Berrien worked to implement workplace protections for pregnant workers.

During Berrien's tenure, the EEOC won $240 million in the EEOC v. Hill Country Farms case. This amounted to the largest award under the American with Disabilities Act (ADA) as well as the largest award in the agency's history at the time.

In 2013, the EEOC under Berrien filed suit against BMW for racial discrimination in hiring at a facility in South Carolina. In 2014, Berrien was replaced as chair by Jenny R. Yang as a member of the commission by Charlotte Burrows.

== Personal life and legacy ==
Berrien was married to Peter M. Williams, the NAACP's executive vice president for programs, for 28 years. She died of cancer in Baltimore on November 9, 2015. NAACP LDF president Sherrilyn Ifil, a close friend of Berrien, honored her dedication to civil rights, stating:

"There are few people who embody the pillars of the civil rights struggle as Jacqueline Berrien did. The talent, dedication, and humility with which she carried out her efforts to enforce our country’s equal employment, voting rights, and access to education laws should serve as beacons for all who do this work".

Following her death, President Obama released a public statement praising Berrien's life of advocacy, stating "she fought hard every day to make real our nation’s promise of equal opportunity for all". According to the New York Daily News, "hundreds of mourners packed Brooklyn's Emmanuel Baptist Church" to mourn Berrien, including Representative Yvette Clarke, her college friend. In 2021, almost six years after her death, a section of Decatur Street in Brooklyn was co-named Jacqueline Berrien Way in her honor.
