= Cari M. Dominguez =

American politician (born 1949)

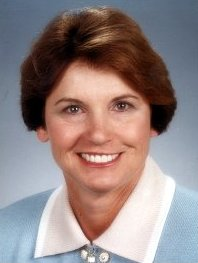
- Cari M. Dominguez

Chair of the Equal Employment Opportunity Commission
- In office 2001–2006
- Preceded by: Ida L. Castro
- Succeeded by: Naomi C. Earp

Personal details
- Born: March 8, 1949 (age 77) Havana, Cuba
- Children: 2
- Education: American University

Cari M. Dominguez (born March 8, 1949) is an American who was the 12th Chair of the U.S. Equal Employment Opportunity Commission (EEOC). She was nominated by President George W. Bush and unanimously confirmed by the U.S. Senate. Her five-year term expired on July 1, 2006.

== Personal life ==
Dominguez was born in Havana, Cuba. Her father was an accountant and her mother was a hospital worker. She was the 12th chair of the EEOC and the first to have a workforce-management background. Dominguez is a Seventh-day Adventist. She and her husband, a human relations executive at American Express, have two sons.

== Career ==
Dominguez holds B.A. and M.A. degrees from the School of International Service at American University, in Washington, D.C. In 2003, Loma Linda University conferred upon her the honorary degree of Doctor of Humanitarian Service.

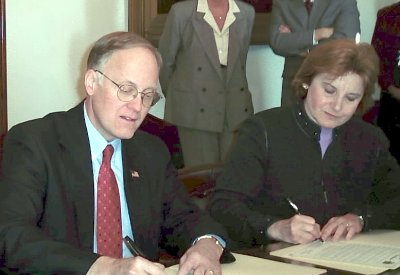
Chairwoman Dominguez and Vermont Governor Jim Douglas sign a resolution aimed at enhancing employment opportunities in state government for people with disabilities.

During the George H. W. Bush administration, then-Labor Secretary Elizabeth Dole recruited her for the Department of Labor. Dominguez served as Assistant Secretary for Employment Standards, Director of the Office of Federal Contract Compliance Programs (OFCCP) and Architect of the Labor Department's Glass Ceiling Initiative. Dominguez had worked in OFCCP as an equal opportunity specialist prior to entering the private sector in 1981. After Bill Clinton took office in 1993, Dominguez ran a management consulting firm, Dominguez and Associates. She also held management positions at Spencer Stuart and Heidrick & Struggles.

Dominguez was appointed in 2001 and unanimously confirmed by the United States Senate. Her term expired on July 1, 2006.

In addition to her government and corporate experience, Dominguez is also a founding member of an Adventist school, a Fellow of the Advanced Study Program in Public Management of the Massachusetts Institute of Technology and has served on the boards of the Leadership Foundation of the International Women's Forum and the Human Resources Planning Society.

She is currently Senior Vice President of Human Resources and Chief Talent and Diversity Officer of Loma Linda University Adventist Health Sciences Center. She has been a director of Manpower Inc. since 2007 and has also been a trustee of the Calvert SAGE Funds since September 2008.

== Awards ==
- Doctor of Humanitarian Service honorary degree from Loma Linda University (2003)
- Charles H. Best Medal for Distinguished Service in the Cause of Diabetes from the American Diabetes Association
