= Gunster, Yoakley & Stewart =

American law firm

Gunster, Yoakley & Stewart, P.A.
- Headquarters: West Palm Beach, Florida, US
- No. of offices: 13
- No. of attorneys: 300
- Key people: George LeMieux (Chairman of the Board); H. William Perry (Managing Shareholder)
- Date founded: 1925
- Website: gunster.com

Gunster, Yoakley & Stewart, P.A. (known as Gunster) is a full-service law firm headquartered in West Palm Beach, Florida. Founded in 1925, the firm provides legal services in areas including corporate law, real estate, litigation, land use, healthcare, estate planning and international estate planning, taxation and international taxation, and government affairs.

== History ==
The firm was founded in West Palm Beach, Florida, in 1925 by attorney John Kenneth Williamson, who had previously served as founding attorney for the First National Bank in Palm Beach. Gunster maintains 13 offices in the Florida cities of Boca Raton, Fort Lauderdale, Miami, Naples, Orlando, Jacksonville, Tallahassee, Tampa, Stuart, Vero Beach, and Palm Beach.

In 2022 the firm added 22 attorneys through a merger with Tampa-based law firm Barnett, Kirkwood, Koche, Long & Foster. In November 2024, the firm added several associate attorneys to its Jacksonville office. In March 2025, Gunster announced a merger with Florida law firm, Katz Barron, adding 14 attorneys to their team. Managing shareholder H. William Perry was named to Florida Trend magazine's "Legal Elite" list of notable managing partners in 2025, marking the third consecutive year he received the recognition. In 2025, Gunster reported that 73 of its attorneys, or about one in three at the firm, were named to the Super Lawyers list. As of 2026, Chambers and Partners ranked Gunster in 14 practice areas and recognized 40 of its attorneys individually, including chairman George LeMieux.

== Litigation ==
In 2007, the Florida Fourth District Court of Appeal upheld a $1.04 million legal malpractice judgment against Gunster in a suit brought by the sons of Charles V. McAdam Jr., an heir to the Gannett newspaper fortune. The plaintiffs alleged that a Gunster attorney had improperly appointed J.P. Morgan Trust Company, a client of the firm, to administer their father's estate, resulting in excessive fees. The appellate panel found that the firm's negligence had frustrated the intent of McAdam's will and diminished his sons' inheritance.

== Data breach ==
Gunster discovered in November 2022 that an unauthorized party had gained access to its document management file system. The firm later determined that the intrusion had exposed personal data belonging to roughly 746,000 residents, including names, dates of birth, Social Security numbers, driver's license and passport numbers, and some financial and medical records. An investigation found that 8,605 California residents were among those affected, and Gunster began mailing notification letters to them on December 1, 2023.

A proposed class action, Whalen v. Gunster, Yoakley & Stewart, P.A., was filed against the firm in May 2024, alleging it had failed to adequately safeguard the data. Gunster agreed to pay $8.5 million to settle the case, and the settlement received final court approval in August 2025.
