= Janet Dhillon =

American lawyer

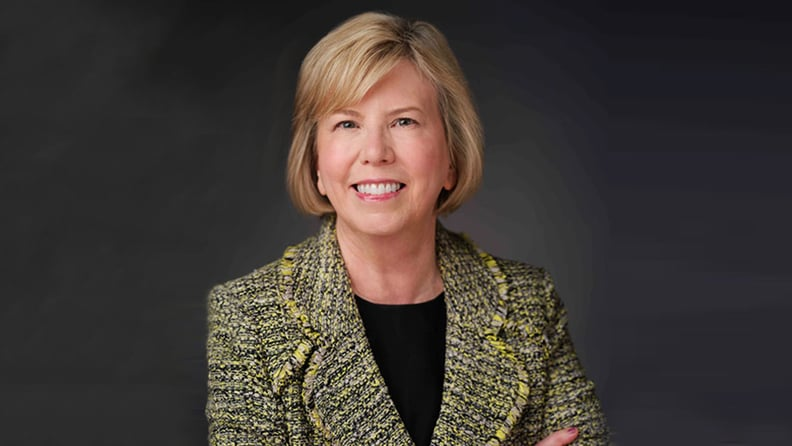

Director of the Pension Benefit Guaranty Corporation
- Incumbent
- Assumed office November 3, 2025
- President: Donald Trump
- Preceded by: Gordon Hartogensis

Commissioner of the Equal Employment Opportunity Commission
- In office May 15, 2019 – November 18, 2022
- President: Donald Trump; Joe Biden
- Preceded by: Jenny R. Yang
- Succeeded by: Kalpana Kotagal

Chair of the Equal Employment Opportunity Commission
- In office May 15, 2019 – January 20, 2021
- President: Donald Trump
- Preceded by: Victoria Lipnic (acting)
- Succeeded by: Charlotte Burrows

Personal details
- Born: Janet Wilcox New York, U.S.
- Party: Republican
- Spouse: Uttam Dhillon
- Education: Occidental College (BA); University of California, Los Angeles (JD)

Janet Dhillon (née Wilcox) is an American lawyer who is the director of the Pension Benefit Guaranty Corporation. She served as a commissioner at the Equal Employment Opportunity Commission from 2019 to 2022 and as the commission's chair from May 2019 to January 2021. Prior to that, Dhillon was the executive vice president, general counsel, and corporate secretary of Burlington Stores.

== Early life and education ==
Dhillon was born in New York and raised in California. She earned her Bachelor of Arts degree in history from Occidental College. Dhillon attended Occidental College at the same time that future President Barack Obama was on campus, before he transferred to Columbia University. She then earned a Juris Doctor from the UCLA School of Law.

== Career ==
Dhillon began her legal career at the law firm of Skadden, Arps, Slate, Meagher & Flom LLP, where she was employed from 1991 to 2004. From 2004 to 2009, she held a variety of roles at US Airways. In 2009, Dhillon became executive vice president, general counsel, and corporate secretary of J. C. Penney. She joined Burlington Stores in 2015.

Donald Trump nominated Dhillon to the Equal Employment Opportunity Commission on June 29, 2017. She was confirmed on May 8, 2019, and became the agency's chair after being sworn in on May 15, 2019. Following the inauguration of President Joe Biden, Dhillon was replaced as chair of the EEOC by Charlotte Burrows. Although her term expired in July 2022, she remained in office until her resignation on November 18, 2022.

On March 10, 2025, Donald Trump nominated Dhillon to serve as director of the Pension Benefit Guaranty Corporation. Dhillon served as the Acting Assistant Secretary of the Employee Benefits Security Administration at the United States Department of Labor before being sworn in as the director of the PBGC on November 3, 2025.

== Personal life ==
She is married to Uttam Dhillon, former acting administrator of the Drug Enforcement Administration.
