= Andrea R. Lucas =

American lawyer

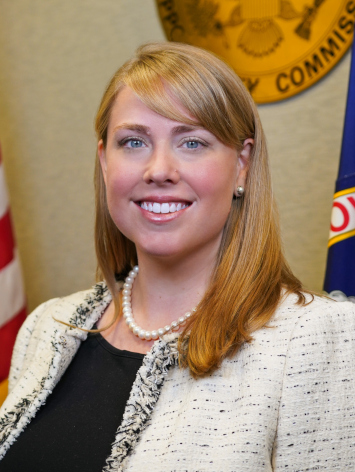

18th Chair of the United States Equal Employment Opportunity Commission
- Incumbent
- Assumed office January 20, 2025; Acting: January 20, 2025 – November 6, 2025
- President: Donald Trump
- Preceded by: Charlotte Burrows

Member of the United States Equal Employment Opportunity Commission
- Incumbent
- Assumed office October 19, 2020
- President: Donald Trump; Joe Biden; Donald Trump
- Preceded by: Victoria Lipnic

Personal details
- Born: Andrea Ruth Lucas; 1985 or 1986 (age 40–41)
- Party: Republican
- Education: University of Virginia

Andrea Ruth Lucas (born 1985 or 1986) is an American lawyer, currently serving as the chair of the United States Equal Employment Opportunity Commission (EEOC). She was appointed as the commission's acting chair by Donald Trump in 2025. Lucas is a vocal opponent of diversity, equity, and inclusion initiatives, believing that they motivate reverse discrimination. She has also criticized the application of federal civil rights protections to transgender individuals.

== Early life and education ==
She was raised in Strongsville, Ohio. She earned a Juris Doctor degree from the University of Virginia.

== Career ==
After graduating in 2011, she began working at Gibson Dunn. She then served as a law clerk for the District Court for the Eastern District of Virginia from 2012 to 2013. She returned to work at Gibson Dunn in 2013. At Gibson Dunn, she defended Ford Motor against a number of cases, including two class action lawsuits alleging sex harassment, race discrimination, and retaliation.

=== Equal Employment Opportunity Commission ===
She was appointed to the United States Equal Employment Opportunity Commission in 2020 by the Trump administration. During her confirmation hearing, she stated that her goals were to pursue cases related to religious and national-origin discrimination, end DEI initiatives, and end what she called the elevation of gender identity over biological sex. She denied that the EEOC was independent from the executive branch.

She was appointed to chair of the commission in January 2025. Shortly after her appointment to acting chair, she announced that it was a priority for the agency to "defend the biological and binary reality of sex". She eliminated gender identity-based harassment guidance and the ability for federal workers to file gender identity discrimination complaints.

In October 2025, the commission dismissed multiple cases it had previously brought on behalf of transgender and gender-nonconforming people. In January 2026, she led the commission to rescind guidance for employers about workplace harassment.

In August 2026, the EEOC signed a settlement to not pursue any claims of gender identity-based discrimination against the members of the Christian Employers Alliance in perpetuity.

Political offices
Preceded by Victoria Lipnic	Member of the United States Equal Employment Opportunity Commission; 2020–present	Incumbent
Preceded by Charlotte Burrows	Chair of the United States Equal Employment Opportunity Commission; Acting; 2025–present	Incumbent
