= Jenny R. Yang =

American politician

Jenny Yang
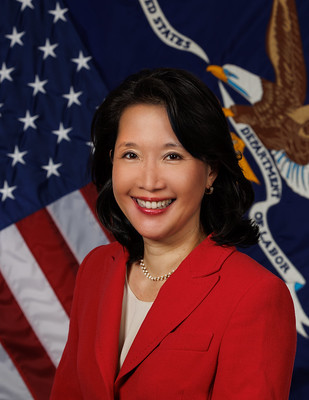

Director of the Office of Federal Contract Compliance Programs
- In office January 21, 2021 – April 1, 2023
- President: Joe Biden
- Preceded by: Craig Leen
- Succeeded by: Catherine Eschbach

Commissioner of the Equal Employment Opportunity Commission
- In office May 13, 2013 – January 3, 2018
- President: Barack Obama; Donald Trump
- Preceded by: Stuart Ishimaru
- Succeeded by: Janet Dhillon

Chair of the Equal Employment Opportunity Commission
- In office September 1, 2014 – January 25, 2017
- President: Barack Obama; Donald Trump
- Preceded by: Jacqueline A. Berrien
- Succeeded by: Victoria Lipnic (acting)

Personal details
- Born: Jenny Rae Yang; 1970 or 1971 (age 54–55)
- Party: Democratic
- Spouse: Kil Huh
- Education: Cornell University (BA); New York University (JD)

Jenny Rae Yang (born 1970/1971) is an American attorney and public official. In 2021, Yang was appointed by President Joe Biden to serve as the Director of Office of Federal Contract Compliance Programs, an agency within the Department of Labor.

Prior to this, Yang served as a member of the Equal Employment Opportunity Commission (EEOC) from 2012 to 2017, and led the commission as chair from 2014 to 2017.

== Early life and education ==
Yang grew up in Livingston, New Jersey, where she attended Livingston High School and played on the tennis team. Yang has a bachelor's degree in government from Cornell University and a Juris Doctor degree from New York University School of Law.

== Legal career ==
Yang clerked for Edmund V. Ludwig at the United States District Court for the Eastern District of Pennsylvania. Between 1998 and 2003, Yang worked as an investigating prosecutor for the Labor Litigation Section of the Department of Justice Civil Rights Division.

In 2003, Yang joined the firm Cohen Milstein as a partner, where she primarily represented workers in civil rights litigation.

== Equal Employment Opportunity Commission (EEOC) ==
Yang was appointed to a position on the Equal Employment Opportunity Commission (EEOC), a federal agency tasked with enforcing civil laws against workplace discrimination, by President Barack Obama on August 2, 2012.

In 2014, Yang was chosen to succeed Jacqueline A. Berrien as Chair of the EEOC. She was succeeded as chair by acting chair Victoria Lipnic and left the commission on January 3, 2018. During Yang's time as chair, the EEOC established a Select Task Force on the Study of Harassment in the Workplace to address workplace sexual harassment.

== Post-EEOC career ==
Yang served as a Leadership in Government Fellow at the Open Society Foundations from January 8, 2018, to July 2019. She served as a Fellow and later Senior Fellow at the Center on Labor, Human Services, and Population at the Urban Institute from June 2018 to January 2021. She testified before the U.S. Senate Judiciary Committee on best practices in preventing sexual harassment in the federal courts.

In 2019, Yang was mentioned by liberal group Demand Justice as one of their recommended Supreme Court nominees.

In 2020, Yang testified before the House Committee on Education and Labor, where she advocated for what she describes as a "Workers' Bill of Rights for Algorithmic Decisions" to regulate algorithmic employment decisions.

== Department of Labor ==
In November 2020, Yang was named a volunteer member of the Joe Biden presidential transition Agency Review Team to support transition efforts related to the Department of Labor. Upon Biden's inauguration, Yang was appointed to serve as Director of Office of Federal Contract Compliance Programs (OFCCP) at the Department of Labor. In this capacity, she indicated that prioritizing pay equity and workforce diversity initiatives would be a key goal of the OFCCP.

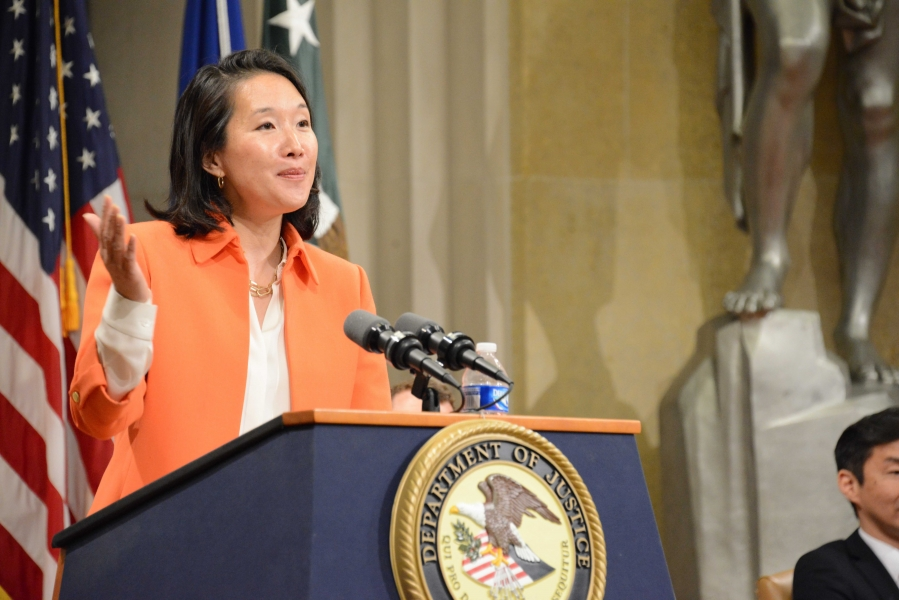
Yang as featured speaker at the Department of Justice's 2015 Asian American and Pacific Islander Heritage Month Program.

== Personal life ==
Yang is married to Kil Huh, also a graduate of Cornell, NYU and Columbia University. The couple have two sons.
