= Victoria Lipnic =

American lawyer (born 1960)

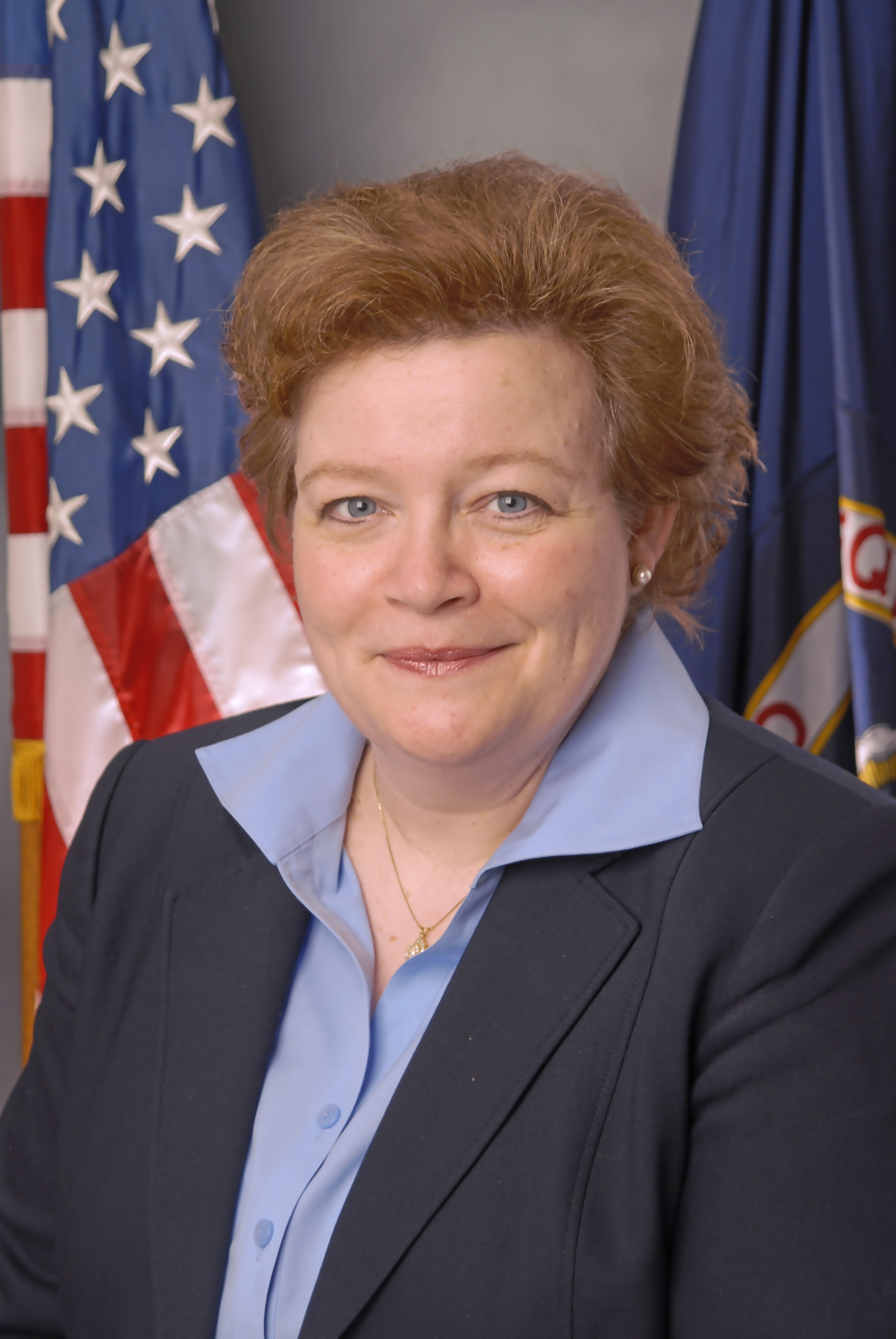
- Official portrait, 2010

Chair of the Equal Employment Opportunity Commission
- Acting; January 25, 2017 – May 15, 2019
- President: Donald Trump
- Preceded by: Jenny R. Yang
- Succeeded by: Janet Dhillon

United States Assistant Secretary of Labor for Employment Standards
- In office March 22, 2002 – January 20, 2009
- President: George W. Bush
- Preceded by: Bernard E. Anderson
- Succeeded by: Shelby Hallmark (acting)

Personal details
- Born: Victoria Ann Lipnic; 1960 (age 65–66) Carrolltown, Pennsylvania, U.S.
- Party: Republican
- Education: Allegheny College (BA); George Mason University (JD)

Victoria Ann Lipnic (born 1960) is an American lawyer and public figure who served as the acting chair of the Equal Employment Opportunity Commission from 2017 to 2019. A member of the Republican Party, she served as the United States Assistant Secretary of Labor for Employment Standards from 2002 to 2009.

== Early life ==
Lipnic was born and raised in Carrolltown, Pennsylvania, where her late father Ed Lipnic was a teacher and long-serving mayor.

Lipnic has a bachelor's degree in Political Science and History from Allegheny College and a JD degree from George Mason University School of Law. In 2016, Allegheny College conferred upon her the honorary degree of Doctor of Humane Letters.

== Career ==
In March 2002, Lipnic joined the U.S. Department of Labor (DOL) as Assistant Secretary for Employment Standards. The Employment Standards Administration (ESA) was the largest agency of the DOL with more than 4,000 employees around the country and a $5 billion budget. ESA consisted of the Wage and Hour Division, the Office of Federal Contract Compliance Programs, the Office of Labor Management Standards, and the Office of Worker’s Compensation Programs. She was responsible for administering and enforcing some of the Nation’s most significant Federal labor and employment laws including the Fair Labor Standards Act, the Family and Medical Leave Act, migrant farm worker provisions, worker’s compensation benefits to certain employees injured on the job, including the Black Lung program, the non-discrimination and equal employment opportunity by federal contractors and sub-contractors; and the laws ensuring the fiscal responsibility and democracy in most labor organizations. As Assistant Secretary she oversaw revisions to the Family and Medical Leave Act regulations to include the first-ever military family leave provisions and had OFCCP issue the first ever regulatory standards to address compensation discrimination.

Before joining the EEOC in 2010, Lipnic was counsel at the international law firm of Seyfarth Shaw LLP in Washington, D.C. In November 2016, it was widely speculated that Lipnic might become U.S. Secretary of Labor in the Trump Administration. President Trump eventually nominated businessman Andrew Puzder, who later withdrew his nomination, due to lack of votes in the Senate to confirm him. President Trump named Lipnic Acting Chair of the EEOC on January 25, 2017.

At the EEOC, Lipnic was known for her bipartisan leadership, independent thinking, being the swing vote, and as a champion for preventing sexual harassment in the workplace. She co-chaired the EEOC’s Select Task Force on the Study of Harassment in the Workplace and co-authored its Report, along with fellow Commissioner Chai R. Feldblum. Their report was hailed as prescient as they issued it in June 2016, 16 months before the major press reporting, in the fall of 2017, about sexual harassment that launched the #MeToo movement. As leader of the EEOC during #MeToo, she doubled-down on the agency’s enforcement of harassment cases launched new anti-harassment training, known as “Respectful Workplaces,” as part of the agency’s education and outreach efforts, reconvened the Select Task Force, and held a public Commission meeting about further ways to prevent harassment at work. She testified before Congress about recommendations from the Select Task Force when Congress was looking to revise its internal policies and procedures on preventing harassment and again on the topic before the Bi-Partisan Congressional Women’s Caucus.

== Case dumping while at the EEOC ==
Lipnic's time at the EEOC was marred by allegations of case dumping. According to the AFGE (American Federation of Government Employees), the labor union representing agency investigators, under Lipnic's tenure, the EEOC closed over 12,000+ cases summarily, violating the due process rights of aggrieved parties. Figures from FEDweek, reported that as many as 70,000+ cases were closed in this manner. On June 14, 2019, Vox, in partnership with the Center for Public Integrity, reported on ongoing practices at the EEOC, in which cases were being closed prior to investigations. The period in which this took place coincided with the Me Too movement.

== Support for LGBT protections ==
During her decade at the EEOC, the Commission advanced civil rights protections in employment for LGBT individuals. Early in the Trump administration, as Acting Chair, she made it clear the EEOC would continue to strongly enforce the federal EEO laws and keep advocating for federal anti-discrimination protection for LGBT workers. This put her at odds with the Trump administration’s roll-back of such protections. When the Trump administration’s Department of Justice (DOJ) filed briefs before the United States Supreme Court reversing the EEOC’s position to protect LGBT workers, Lipnic’s vote on the Commission prevented the EEOC from joining the DOJ brief. In June 2020, the United States Supreme Court issued a landmark decision, adopting the EEOC’s position and extending workplace protections to LGBT workers under Title VII of the Civil Rights Act of 1964.

== Age discrimination ==
Lipnic put a focus on age discrimination during her time at the Commission, recognizing it as a significant issue for many workers. As Acting Chair, she led an agency hearing on age bias, and issued a major report on the Age Discrimination in Employment Act (ADEA) on its 50th anniversary. AARP recognized her for calling attention to the issue.
