= United States Equal Employment Opportunity Commission =

US agency fighting workplace discrimination

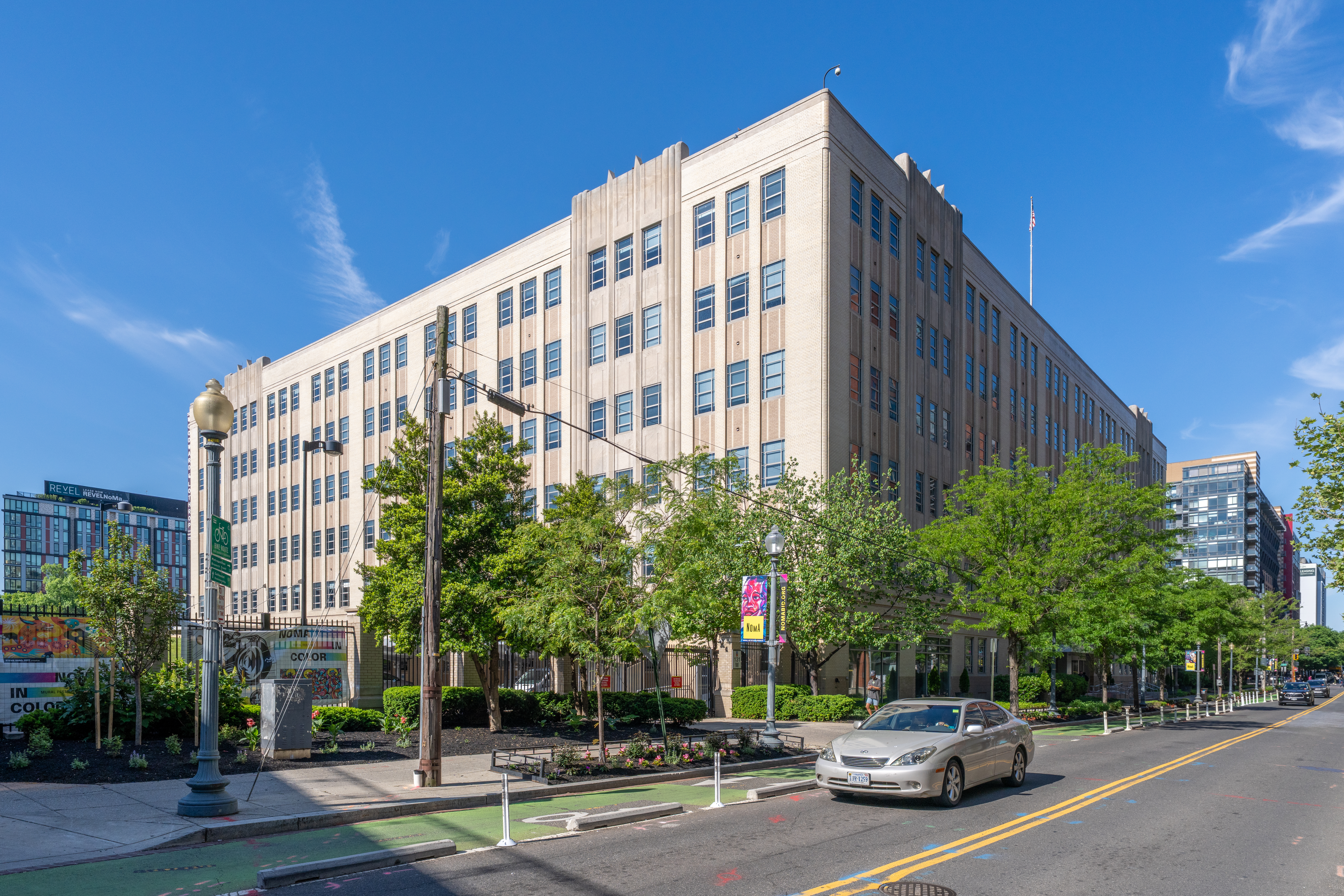
- Headquartered in the Woodward & Lothrop Service Warehouse

Agency overview
- Formed: July 2, 1965; 61 years ago
- Jurisdiction: United States
- Headquarters: 131 M Street, NE Washington, DC 20507
- Employees: 2,068 (FY21)
- Annual budget: $379,500,000 (FY18)
- Agency executive: Andrea R. Lucas, Chair; Catherine Eschbach, Acting General Counsel
- Parent department: Independent Agency
- Key document: Civil Rights Act of 1964
- Website: eeoc.gov

The United States Equal Employment Opportunity Commission (EEOC) is a United States federal government agency that was established via the Civil Rights Act of 1964 to administer and enforce civil rights laws against workplace discrimination. The EEOC investigates discrimination complaints based on an individual's race, color, national origin, religion, sex (including sexual orientation, pregnancy, and gender identity), age, disability, genetic information, and retaliation for participating in a discrimination complaint proceeding and/or opposing a discriminatory practice.

The commission also mediates and settles thousands of discrimination complaints each year prior to their investigation. The EEOC is also empowered to file civil discrimination suits against employers on behalf of alleged victims. The commission cannot adjudicate claims or impose administrative sanctions. Since 2025, the chair of the EEOC is Andrea R. Lucas.

== Process and enforcement ==
=== Authority ===
The EEOC has the authority to investigate and prosecute cases against most organizations, including labor unions and employment agencies, employing 15 workers or more, or, in the case of age discrimination, 20 or more workers. The commissioner of the EEOC can issue charges without a complainant, referred to as a "commissioner's charge". Discrimination complaints can be based on hiring, firing, promotions, harassment, training, wages, and/or benefits, and responsibility covers:

- Title VII of the Civil Rights Act of 1964
- Sections 102 and 103 of the Civil Rights Act of 1991
- Pregnancy Discrimination Act
- Equal Pay Act of 1963
- Title I of the Americans with Disabilities Act of 1990
- Sections 501 and 505 of the Rehabilitation Act of 1973
- Age Discrimination in Employment Act of 1967
- Genetic Information Nondiscrimination Act
- Pregnant Workers Fairness Act

=== Process ===
The EEOC investigation is confidential until the charge is filed, when the EEOC has 10 days to notify the employer of the charge. Charges may be filed on behalf of someone else to maintain some anonymity, for example, a parent may file a charge on behalf of a minor child.

==== Alternative dispute resolution ====
Because all federal agencies are required to offer an alternative dispute resolution, the EEOC offers mediation with external or internal professional mediators as a voluntary alternative to litigation, which typically results in faster resolutions. In the 2020 fiscal year (FY), the EEOC reported more than 6,000 mediations conducted recovering nearly half of the $333.2 million in relief from mediation, conciliation, and settlement. Mediation is offered, or can be requested, prior to investigation, or after a finding of discrimination has been issued, during conciliation. If the EEOC does not find merit in the charge, they will not offer, nor allow for a request, for mediation. The average mediation with the EEOC takes three months.

==== Respondent's position statement and investigation ====
Employers have 30 days from receipt of a charge to respond to allegations prior to any investigation or mediation offering, or if voluntary mediation was used, but unsuccessful. Charging parties have 20 days to respond to the respondent's position statement. The EEOC may ask the employer for additional information such as witness interviews, an on-site interview, or personnel files and policies. An investigator will determine whether or not there is reasonable cause to determine whether or not discrimination has occurred. In FY 2020, the EEOC found 17.4% of charged cases to have merit. The EEOC says investigations typically take 10 months or longer.

==== Right to sue ====
A right to sue gives claimants the right to file a lawsuit in federal court. Right-to-sue notices are granted when the agency does not pursue litigation, because the claimant requests the notice after 180 days have elapsed into an investigation; the EEOC finds merit following an investigation, but declines to prosecute; or the agency is unable to determine if there is reasonable cause that the law may have been violated.

Charges filed under the Equal Pay Act or Age Discrimination in Employment Act do not require a right to sue. Age discrimination lawsuits may be filed 60 days after the charge has been filed with the EEOC, while lawsuits due to wage discrimination based on sex may be within two years from the last discriminatory paycheck.

==== Litigation ====
The Office of General Counsel, which is led by an appointee of the president that has been confirmed by the Senate for a four-year term, prosecutes EEOC cases to recover relief for complainants the agency has found to be victims of discrimination. The EEOC does not have the resources to file a lawsuit in every case where discrimination has been found and weighs the seriousness and potential impact on determining whether or not to litigate. In FY 2020, the EEOC recovered $106 million in relief through litigation of 93 meritorious lawsuits, 13 of which were systemic, accounting for $69.9 million of the relief. The EEOC defines systemic cases as "pattern or practice, policy and/or class cases where the discrimination has a broad impact on an industry, profession, company or geographic location", and all cases are investigated as potentially systemic.

=== Remedies ===
When a finding of discrimination is found by the EEOC, the goal of the agency is injunctive relief, both to put the victim in the position they would have been in had the discrimination not occurred, and to stop and prevent the discriminatory behavior. This could include back-pay, job reinstatement, attorney's fees, expert witness fees, court costs, other compensatory damages, and punitive damages. Age-based discrimination and gender-based wage discrimination are not eligible for compensatory or punitive damages, but instead are limited to liquidated damages equal to the amount of back pay. Pecuniary future damages and non-pecuniary damages are limited per employee by the size of the employer:

- For employers with 15–100 employees, the limit is $50,000.
- For employers with 101–200 employees, the limit is $100,000.
- For employers with 201–500 employees, the limit is $200,000.
- For employers with more than 500 employees, the limit is $300,000.

=== Investigative compliance policy ===
EEOC applies an investigative compliance policy when respondents are uncooperative in providing information during an investigation of a charge. If a respondent fails to turn over requested information, field offices are to subpoena the information, file a direct suit on the merits of a charge, or use the legal principle of adverse inference, which assumes the withheld information is against the respondent.

== History ==
=== 20th century ===
In 1941, the precursor of the EEOC was set up with Executive Order 8802 of FDR: Fair Employment Practice Committee (FEPC).

On March 6, 1961, President John F. Kennedy signed Executive Order 10925, which required government contractors to "take affirmative action to ensure that applicants are employed and that employees are treated during employment without regard to their race, creed, color, or national origin". It established the President's Committee on Equal Employment Opportunity, which then vice president Lyndon Johnson was appointed to head. This was the forerunner of the EEOC.

The EEOC was established on July 2, 1965. Management directive 715 is a regulatory guidance document from the commission to all federal agencies regarding adherence to equal opportunity employment laws and reporting requirements.

The EEOC's first complainants were female flight attendants. However, the EEOC at first ignored sex discrimination complaints, and the prohibition against sex discrimination in employment went unenforced for the next few years. One EEOC director called the prohibition "a fluke... conceived out of wedlock".

=== 2000–2024 ===
In 2005, the EEOC established the Systemic Task Force (STF) to evaluate how the agency combats systemic discrimination. In March 2006, the STF determined that the agency could not effectively address system discrimination without a nationwide system, but that the EEOC was uniquely prepared to fight systemic discrimination because the EEOC's broad authority, commissioner's charges, access to data, exemption from Rule 23 of the Federal Rules of Civil Procedure, focus on injunctive relief, and nationwide coverage. As a result, the commission created the role of Systemic Coordinator and Lead Systemic Investigator, and implemented programs that resulted in improved systemic expertise in the agency and all charges being investigated as potential systemic cases.

In 2008, disability-based charges handled by the EEOC rose to a record 19,543, up 10.2 percent from the prior year and the highest level since 1995. That may again be showing that because the EEOC has not adjusted many of their initial 1991 fines for inflation, the backlog of EEOC cases illustrates erosion of deterrence.

In 2011, the commission included "sex-stereotyping" of lesbian, gay, and bisexual individuals, as a form of sex discrimination illegal under Title VII of the Civil Rights Act of 1964. In 2012, the commission expanded protection provided by Title VII to transgender status and gender identity. In 2015, it concluded that for Title VII, sex discrimination includes discrimination based on sexual orientation. The Supreme Court upheld this position in R.G. & G.R. Harris Funeral Homes Inc. v. Equal Employment Opportunity Commission in 2020.

In 2012, the EEOC achieved a second consecutive year of a significant reduction in the charge inventory, something not seen since FY 2002. Due to a concerted effort, the EEOC reduced the pending inventory of private sector charges by 10 percent from FY 2011, bringing the inventory level to 70,312. This inventory reduction is the second consecutive decrease of almost ten percent in charge inventory.

During FY 2020, the EEOC secured a record amount of recovery, more than $535 million, for victims of discrimination in the workplace. Also, the agency reduced the private sector charge inventory by nearly 4 percent to the lowest level in 14 years. Notably, the agency increased the percentage of charges resolved and those with an outcome favorable to the charging party increased by nearly two percent, to 17.4 percent.

=== 2025–present: changes under Trump Administration ===
At the onset of the second presidency of Donald Trump, in February 2025, the EEOC moved to dismiss six of its own pending cases alleging gender identity discrimination: one in Alabama, one in California, three in Illinois and one in New York. It cited President Donald Trump's January 20, 2025, executive order "Defending Women From Gender Ideology Extremism and Restoring Biological Truth to the Federal Government", which defines sex as binary.

Amid an aggressive campaign by the Trump administration to end DEI programs at federal agencies; in February 2025, EEOC acting chair Andrea Lucas sent letters to 20 law firms stating that they were being investigated for their DEI policies, and demanding employment practice details. On March 19, 2025, the EEOC and the Department of Justice (DOJ) jointly released new DEI guidelines.

By the end of fiscal year 2025, the EEOC's staffing had declined to 2,027 full-time equivalents, a reduction of 220 employees — approximately 10 percent — from fiscal year 2024. The agency attributed part of the drop to departures under the federal Deferred Resignation Program. The EEOC received $455 million in appropriations for fiscal year 2025, with a total net cost of operations of $486 million.

== Staffing, workload, and backlog ==
In 1975, when the backlog reached more than 100,000 charges to be investigated, President Gerald Ford's full requested budget of $62 million was approved. A "Backlog Unit" was created in Philadelphia in 1978 to resolve the thousands of federal equal employment complaints inherited from the Civil Service Commission. In 1980, Eleanor Holmes Norton began re-characterizing the backlog cases as "workload" in her reports to Congress, thus fulfilling her promise to eliminate the backlog.

In June 2006, civil rights and labor union advocates publicly complained that the effectiveness of the EEOC was being undermined by budget and staff cuts and the outsourcing of complaint screening to a private contractor whose workers were poorly trained. In 2006, a partial budget freeze prevented the agency from filling vacant jobs, and its staff had shrunk by nearly 20 percent from 2001. A Bush administration official stated that the cuts had been made because it was necessary to direct more money to defense and homeland security. By 2008, the EEOC had lost 25 percent of its staff over the previous eight years, including investigators and lawyers who handle the cases. The number of complaints to investigate grew to 95,400 in fiscal 2008, up 26 percent from 2006.

The outsourcing to Pearson Government Solutions in Kansas cost the agency $4.9 million and was called a "huge waste of money" by the president of the EEOC employees' union in 2006.

== Race and ethnicity ==
The EEOC requires employers to report various information about their employees, in particular their racial/ethnic categories, to prevent discrimination based on race/ethnicity. The definitions used in the report have been different at different times.

In 1997, the Office of Management and Budget gave a Federal Register Notice, the "Revisions to the Standards for the Classification of Federal Data on Race and Ethnicity", which defined new racial and ethnic definitions. As of September 30, 2007, the EEOC's EEO-1 report must use the new racial and ethnic definitions in establishing grounds for racial or ethnic discrimination. If an employee identifies their ethnicity as "Hispanic or Latino" as well as a race, the race is not reported in EEO-1, but it is kept as part of the employment record.

A person's skin color or physical appearance can also be grounds for a case of racial discrimination. Discrimination based on national origin can be grounds for a case on discrimination as well.

== Successes ==
On May 1, 2013, a Davenport, Iowa jury awarded the U.S. Equal Employment Opportunity Commissission damages totaling $240 million—the largest verdict in the federal agency's history—for disability discrimination and severe abuse. The jury agreed with the EEOC that Texas-based Hill County Farms, doing business in Iowa as Henry's Turkey Service, subjected a group of 32 men with intellectual disabilities to severe abuse and discrimination for a period between 2007 and 2009, after 20 years of similar mistreatment. This victory received international attention and was profiled in The New York Times.

On June 1, 2015, the U.S. Supreme Court held in an 8–1 decision written by Justice Antonin Scalia that an employer may not refuse to hire an applicant if the employer was motivated by avoiding the need to accommodate a religious practice. Such behavior violates the prohibition on religious discrimination contained in Title VII of the Civil Rights Act of 1964. EEOC general counsel David Lopez hailed the decision. "At its root, this case is about defending the quintessentially American principles of religious freedom and tolerance," Lopez said. "This decision is a victory for our increasingly diverse society and we applaud Samantha Elauf's courage and tenacity in pursuing this matter."

== Criticism ==
Some employment-law professionals criticized the agency after it issued advice that requiring a high school diploma from job applicants could violate the Americans with Disabilities Act. The advice letter stated that the longtime lowest common denominator of employee screening must be "job-related for the position in question and consistent with business necessity". A Ballard Spahr lawyer suggested, "There will be less incentive for the general public to obtain a high school diploma if many employers eliminate that requirement for job applicants in their workplace."

The EEOC has been criticized for alleged heavy-handed tactics in their 1980 lawsuit against retailer Sears, Roebuck & Co. Based on a statistical analysis of personnel and promotions, EEOC argued that Sears both was systematically excluding women from high-earning positions in commission sales and was paying female management lower wages than male management. Sears, represented by lawyer Charles Morgan, Jr., counter-argued that the company had encouraged female applicants for sales and management, but women preferred lower-paying positions with more stable daytime working hours, as compared to commission sales, which demanded evening and weekend shifts and featured drastically varying paychecks, depending on the numbers of sales in a given pay period. In 1986, the court ruled in favor of Sears on all counts and noted that the EEOC had neither produced a single witness who alleged discrimination nor identified any Sears policy that discriminated against women.

In a 2011 ruling against the EEOC, Judge Loretta A. Preska declared that the agency relied too heavily on anecdotal claims rather than on hard data, in a lawsuit against Bloomberg, L.P. that alleged discrimination against pregnant employees. In a ruling described in the New York Times as "strongly worded," Preska wrote, "the law does not mandate 'work–life balance' and added that while Bloomberg had expected high levels of dedication from employees, the company did not treat women who took pregnancy leave differently from those who took leave for other reasons.

During the first Donald Trump administration, the EEOC came under criticism for being ineffective. The budget allocated to the EEOC by Congress has forced it to downsize, cutting its original staffing levels by over 40%.

== Commissioners ==
The commission is composed of five members, appointed by the president of the United States with the consent of the United States Senate. They serve terms of five years. They may continue to serve until their successor are appointed and qualified, though not longer than 60 days when the Senate is in session without a nomination having been submitted, or after the adjournment sine die of the session of the Senate in which such nomination was submitted. No more than three members of the commission may be members of the same political party.

The president designates one member to serve as chairman, and one member to serve as vice chairman. Three members of the commission constitutes a quorum.

=== Current commissioners ===
The current commissioners as of May 24, 2026:

Position	Name	Party	Took office	Term expires
Chair	Andrea R. Lucas	Republican	October 23, 2020	July 1, 2030
Commissioner	Kalpana Kotagal	Democratic	August 9, 2023	July 1, 2027
Commissioner	Brittany Panuccio	Republican	October 27, 2025	July 1, 2029
Commissioner	Vacant (Note: Charlotte Burrows was fired by Trump. She is contesting her firing in court.)	—N/a	—	July 1, 2028
Commissioner	Vacant	—N/a	—	July 1, 2031

=== Nominations ===
President Trump has nominated the following to fill a seat on the commission. They await Senate confirmation.

Name	Party	Term expires	Replacing
Matt Zandi	Republican	July 1, 2031	Jocelyn Samuels

=== Former ===
- Luther Holcomb, 1965–1974
- Aileen Hernandez, 1965–1966
- Vicente T. Ximenes, 1967–1971
- Samuel C. Jackson, 1965–1968
- Richard Alton Graham, 1965–1966
- Elizabeth Kuck, 1968–1970
- Ethel B. Walsh, 1971–1980
- Colston A. Lewis, 1970–1977
- Raymond Telles, 1971–1976
- J. Clay Smith Jr., 1978–1982
- Hon. Daniel Leach, 1976–1981
- Armando Rodriguez, 1978–1983
- Cathie Shattuck, 1982–1983
- Clarence Thomas, 1982–1990
- Tony Gallegos, 1982–1994
- R. Gaull Silberman, 1984–1995
- Joy Cherian, 1987–1993
- William Webb, 1982–1986
- Fred Alvarez, 1984–1987
- Evan J. Kemp, Jr., 1987–1993
- Joyce Tucker, 1990–1996
- Gilbert Casellas, 1994–1997
- Paul Igasaki, 1994–2002
- Paul Steven Miller, 1994–2004
- Reginald E. Jones, 1996–2000
- Ida L. Castro, 1998–2001
- Cari M. Dominguez, 2001–2006
- Leslie E. Silverman, 2002–2008
- Stuart J. Ishimaru, 2003–2012
- Naomi C. Earp, 2003–2009
- Christine Griffin, 2006–2009
- Constance S. Barker, 2008–2016
- Jacqueline A. Berrien, 2010–2014
- Chai Feldblum, 2010–2019
- Jenny R. Yang, 2010–2019
- Victoria Lipnic, 2010–2019
- Charlotte A. Burrows, 2015–2025
- Janet Dhillon, 2019–2022
- Keith Sonderling, 2020–2024
- Jocelyn Samuels, 2020–2025 (Note: Jocelyn Samuels was fired by Trump. She is contesting her firing in court.)

=== Chairs ===
The following persons served as chair of the Equal Employment Opportunity Commission:

No.	Chair of the EEOC	Photo	Start of term	End of term	Refs.	President(s)
1	Franklin D. Roosevelt Jr.		May 26, 1965	May 11, 1966		Lyndon Johnson
2	Stephen N. Shulman		September 14, 1966	July 1, 1967		Lyndon Johnson
3	Clifford Alexander Jr.		August 4, 1967			Lyndon Johnson
3	Clifford Alexander Jr.			May 1, 1969		Richard Nixon
4	William H. Brown III		May 5, 1969	December 23, 1973		Richard Nixon
5	John H. Powell Jr.		December 28, 1973	August 8, 1974		Richard Nixon
5	John H. Powell Jr.		August 8, 1974	March 18, 1975		Gerald Ford
Acting	Ethel Bent Walsh		March 18, 1975	May 27, 1975		Gerald Ford
6	Lowell W. Perry		May 27, 1975	May 15, 1976		Gerald Ford
Acting	Ethel Bent Walsh		May 15, 1976			Gerald Ford
Acting	Ethel Bent Walsh			May 27, 1977		Jimmy Carter
7	Eleanor Holmes Norton		May 27, 1977			Jimmy Carter
7	Eleanor Holmes Norton			February 21, 1981		Ronald Reagan
Acting	J. Clay Smith Jr.		1981	1982		Ronald Reagan
8	Clarence Thomas		May 6, 1982			Ronald Reagan
8	Clarence Thomas			March 8, 1990		George H. W. Bush
9	Evan J. Kemp Jr.		March 8, 1990			George H. W. Bush
9	Evan J. Kemp Jr.			April 2, 1993		Bill Clinton
Acting	Tony Gallegos		April 5, 1993	1994		Bill Clinton
10	Gilbert Casellas		September 29, 1994	December 31, 1997		Bill Clinton
Acting	Paul Igasaki		January 1, 1998	October 23, 1998		Bill Clinton
11	Ida L. Castro		October 23, 1998			Bill Clinton
11	Ida L. Castro			August 13, 2001		George W. Bush
12	Cari M. Dominguez		August 6, 2001	August 31, 2006		George W. Bush
13	Naomi C. Earp		September 1, 2006	January 20, 2009		George W. Bush
Acting	Stuart J. Ishimaru		January 20, 2009	April 7, 2010		Barack Obama
14	Jacqueline A. Berrien		April 7, 2010	September 2, 2014		Barack Obama
15	Jenny R. Yang		September 2, 2014	January 25, 2017		Barack Obama
Acting	Victoria Lipnic		January 25, 2017	May 15, 2019		Donald Trump
16	Janet Dhillon		May 15, 2019	January 20, 2021		Donald Trump
17	Charlotte Burrows		January 20, 2021	January 20, 2025		Joe Biden
Acting	Andrea R. Lucas		January 20, 2025	November 6, 2025		Donald Trump
18	Andrea R. Lucas		November 6, 2025	Present		Donald Trump

== General counsels ==
The general counsel of the commission is appointed by the president of the United States with the consent of the United States Senate, for a term of four years.

- Charles T. Duncan, 1965–1966
- Richard Berg (acting), 1966–1967
- Kenneth Holbert (acting), 1967
- Daniel Steiner, 1967–1969
- Russell Spector (acting), 1969
- Stanley P. Herbert, 1969–1971
- Jack Pemberton, 1971–1972
- William Carey, 1972–1975
- Julia Cooper (acting), 1975
- Abner Sibal, 1975–1978
- Charles A. Shanor, 1987–1990
- Donald Livingston, 1990–1993
- Clifford Gregory Stewart, 1995–2000
- Eric Dreiband, 2003–2005
- Ronald S. Cooper, 2006–2009
- David Lopez, 2010–2016
- Sharon Fast Gustafson, 2019–2021
- Karla Gilbride, 2023–2025
- Andrew B. Rogers (acting), 2025
- Catherine Eschbach (acting), 2025

== See also ==
- Equal employment opportunity
- Title 29 of the Code of Federal Regulations
- PATCOB
- Race and ethnicity (EEO)
- Katherine Pollak Ellickson
- USA.gov
