= List of political appointments by Joe Biden =

Following his election victory in 2020, U.S. president Joe Biden had 4,000 political appointments to make to the federal government. Of those 4,000 political appointments, more than 1250 require Senate confirmation. Upon taking office, Biden quickly placed more than 1,000 high-level officials into roles that did not require confirmation. As of December 3, 2024, according to tracking by The Washington Post and Partnership for Public Service covering 810 positions, 673 nominees have been confirmed by the United States Senate, 2 are being considered by the Senate, and 69 tracked positions have no nominee.

== Color key ==
- Denotes appointees awaiting Senate confirmation.
- Denotes appointees serving in an acting capacity.
- Denotes appointees who have left office or offices which have been disbanded.

== Executive Office of the President ==
Office	Appointee	Assumed office	Left office
— White House Chief of Staff	Jeff Zients	February 8, 2023	January 20, 2025
— White House Chief of Staff	Ron Klain	January 20, 2021	February 7, 2023
— White House Deputy Chief of Staff	Bruce Reed	January 20, 2021	January 20, 2025
— White House Deputy Chief of Staff	Natalie Quillian	February 8, 2023	January 20, 2025
— White House Deputy Chief of Staff	Annie Tomasini	February 9, 2024	January 20, 2025
— White House Deputy Chief of Staff	Jen O'Malley Dillon	January 20, 2021	February 8, 2024
— Director of the National Economic Council	Lael Brainard	February 21, 2023	January 20, 2025
— Director of the National Economic Council	Brian Deese	January 20, 2021	February 21, 2023
— Director of the Domestic Policy Council	Neera Tanden	May 26, 2023	January 20, 2025
— Director of the Domestic Policy Council	Susan Rice	January 20, 2021	May 26, 2023
— National Security Advisor	Jake Sullivan	January 20, 2021	January 20, 2025
— National Climate Advisor	Ali Zaidi	September 16, 2022	January 20, 2025
— National Climate Advisor	Gina McCarthy	January 20, 2021	September 16, 2022
— Special Presidential Envoy for Climate	John Podesta	March 6, 2024	January 20, 2025
— Special Presidential Envoy for Climate	John Kerry	January 20, 2021	March 6, 2024
— Director of the Office of Science and Technology Policy	Arati Prabhakar	October 3, 2022 (Confirmed September 22, 2022, 56–40)	January 20, 2025
— Director of the Office of Science and Technology Policy	Alondra Nelson	February 18, 2022	October 3, 2022
— Director of the Office of Science and Technology Policy	Eric Lander	June 2, 2021 (Confirmed May 28, 2021 by voice vote)	February 18, 2022 Resigned amid reports that he bullied staff members
— Chair of the Council on Environmental Quality	Brenda Mallory	April 16, 2021 (Confirmed April 14, 2021, 53–45)	January 20, 2025
— United States Trade Representative	Katherine Tai	March 18, 2021 (Confirmed March 17, 2021, 98–0)	January 20, 2025
— Director of the Office of Management and Budget	Shalanda Young	March 24, 2021 (Confirmed March 23, 2021, 63–37)	March 17, 2022
— Director of the Office of Management and Budget	Shalanda Young	Deputy Director of the Office of Management and Budget	March 17, 2022
— Director of the Office of Management and Budget	Shalanda Young	March 17, 2022 (Confirmed March 15, 2022, 61–36)	January 20, 2025
— Chair of the Council of Economic Advisers	Jared Bernstein	July 10, 2023 (Confirmed June 13, 2023, 50–49)	January 20, 2025
— Chair of the Council of Economic Advisers	Cecilia Rouse	March 12, 2021 (Confirmed March 2, 2021, 95–4)	March 31, 2023

== Office of the Vice President of the United States ==
Office	Appointee	Assumed office	Left office
— Chief of Staff to the Vice President	Lorraine Voles	May 16, 2022	—
— Chief of Staff to the Vice President	Tina Flournoy	January 20, 2021	May 16, 2022
— Deputy Chief of Staff to the Vice President	Erin Wilson	May 31, 2022	—
— Deputy Chief of Staff to the Vice President	Michael Fuchs	January 20, 2021	May 2022
— Chief of Staff to the Second Gentleman	Katie Peters	April 2022	—
— Chief of Staff to the Second Gentleman	Julie Mason	January 20, 2021	April 2022
— Communications Director for the Vice President	Vacant	—	—
— Communications Director for the Vice President	Jamal Simmons	January 9, 2022	January 5, 2023
— Communications Director for the Vice President	Ashley Etienne	January 20, 2021	December 2021
— Deputy Communications Director for the Vice President	Chris Evans	October 2023	—
— Deputy Communications Director for the Vice President	Rachel Palermo (Note: From March to November 2023 she served in a dual role as Deputy Communications Director & Associate Counsel to the Vice President)	March 2022	November 2033
— Deputy Communications Director for the Vice President	Herbie Ziskend	January 20, 2021	March 2022
— Senior Advisor and Chief Spokesperson for the Vice President	Symone Sanders	January 20, 2021	December 2021
— Senior Advisor for Communications for the Vice President	Herbie Ziskend	March 2022	August 2022
— Senior Advisor for Messaging & Outreach for the Vice President	Stephanie Young	March 2023	—
— Press Secretary for the Vice President	Kirsten Allen	March 2022	—
— Deputy Press Secretary for the Vice President	Ernesto Apreza	March 2022	—
— Deputy Press Secretary for the Vice President	Sabrina Singh	January 20, 2021	March 31, 2022
— Domestic Policy Advisor to the Vice President	Carmel Martin	September 2022	—
— Domestic Policy Advisor to the Vice President	Rohini Kosoglu	January 20, 2021	August 2022
— National Security Advisor to the Vice President	Philip H. Gordon	March 21, 2022	—
— National Security Advisor to the Vice President	Nancy McEldowney	January 20, 2021	March 21, 2022
— Deputy National Security Advisor to the Vice President	Rebecca Lissner	April 2022	—
— Deputy National Security Advisor to the Vice President	Philip H. Gordon	January 20, 2021	March 21, 2022
— Policy Advisor to the Vice President	Ike Irby	January 20, 2021	—
— Deputy Policy Advisor to the Vice President	Deanne Millison	January 20, 2021	—
— Assistant to Chief of Staff	Yael Belkind	January 20, 2021	—
— Director of Management and Administration	Cynthia Bernstein	January 20, 2021	—
— Deputy Director of the Office of Public Engagement and Intergovernmental Affairs	Brandon Thompson	January 2022	—
— Deputy Director of the Office of Public Engagement and Intergovernmental Affairs	Vincent Evans	January 20, 2021	January 2022
— Director of Speech Writing	Dave Cavell	October 2022	—
— Director of Speech Writing	Meghan Groob	April 2022	July 2022
— Director of Speech Writing	Kate Childs Graham	January 20, 2021	February 2022
— Counsel to the Vice President	Erica Songer	January 2023	—
— Counsel to the Vice President	Josh Hsu	January 20, 2021	January 5, 2023
— Photographer to the Vice President	Lawrence Jackson	January 20, 2021	—
— Chief Economic Advisor to Vice President	Deanne Millison	July 2022	—
— Chief Economic Advisor to Vice President	Mike Pyle	January 20, 2021	May 2022
— Director of Press Operations	Tate Mitchell	January 5, 2022	—
— Director of Press Operations	Peter Velz	January 20, 2021	January 5, 2022

== Office of the First Lady of the United States ==
Office	Appointee	Assumed office	Left office
— Chief of Staff to the First Lady	Vacant	—	—
— Chief of Staff to the First Lady	Julissa Reynoso Pantaleón	January 20, 2021	January 17, 2022
— Personal Aide to the First Lady	Jordan Montoya	October 2022	—
— Policy Director for the First Lady	Mala Adiga	January 20, 2021	—
— Senior Advisor for the First Lady	Anthony Bernal	January 20, 2021	—
— Communications Director for the First Lady	Elizabeth Alexander	January 20, 2021	—
— Press Secretary for the First Lady	Vanessa Valdivia	September 19, 2022	—
— Press Secretary for the First Lady	Michael LaRosa	January 20, 2021	July 31, 2022
— Executive Director of Joining Forces	Rory Brosius	January 20, 2021	—
— Director of Scheduling and Advance	DJ Sigworth	August 2022	—
— Director of Scheduling and Advance	Gina Lee	January 20, 2021	March 2022
— Deputy Policy Director	Vanessa Lion	January 20, 2021	—
— Director of Advance & Trip Director	Jordan Montoya	January 20, 2021	October 2022
— Digital Director	Garima Verma	January 20, 2021	May 2021

== Federal executive departments ==
=== Department of State ===
Office	Nominee	Assumed office	Left office
— Secretary of State	Antony Blinken	January 26, 2021 (Confirmed January 26, 2021, 78–22)	—
— Deputy Secretary of State	Kurt M. Campbell	February 12, 2024 (Confirmed February 6, 2024, 92–5)	–
— Deputy Secretary of State	Wendy Sherman	April 14, 2021 (Confirmed April 13, 2021, 56–42)	July 28, 2023
— United States Ambassador to the United Nations	Linda Thomas-Greenfield	February 25, 2021 (Confirmed February 23, 2021, 78–20)	—

=== Department of the Treasury ===
Office	Nominee	Assumed office	Left office
— Secretary of the Treasury	Janet Yellen	January 26, 2021 (Confirmed January 25, 2021, 84–15)	—
— Deputy Secretary of the Treasury	Wally Adeyemo	March 26, 2021 (Confirmed March 25, 2021 by voice vote)	—

=== Department of Defense ===
Office	Nominee	Assumed office	Left office
— Secretary of Defense	Lloyd Austin	January 22, 2021 (Confirmed January 22, 2021, 93–2)	—
— Deputy Secretary of Defense	Kathleen Hicks	February 9, 2021 (Confirmed February 8, 2021 by voice vote)	—

=== Department of Justice ===
Office	Nominee	Assumed office	Left office
— Attorney General	Merrick Garland	March 11, 2021 (Confirmed March 10, 2021, 70–30)	—
— Deputy Attorney General	Lisa Monaco	April 21, 2021 (Confirmed April 20, 2021, 98–2)	—
— Associate Attorney General
— Associate Attorney General	Benjamin C. Mizer	February 2, 2024	–
— Associate Attorney General	Vanita Gupta	April 22, 2021 (Confirmed April 21, 2021, 51–49)	February 2, 2024

=== Department of the Interior ===
Office	Nominee	Assumed office	Left office
— Secretary of the Interior	Deb Haaland	March 16, 2021 (Confirmed March 15, 2021, 51–40)	—
— Deputy Secretary of the Interior
— Deputy Secretary of the Interior	Laura Daniel-Davis	October 31, 2023	–
— Deputy Secretary of the Interior	Tommy Beaudreau	June 23, 2021 (Confirmed June 17, 2021, 88–9)	October 27, 2023

=== Department of Agriculture ===
Office	Nominee	Assumed office	Left office
— Secretary of Agriculture	Tom Vilsack	February 24, 2021 (Confirmed February 23, 2021, 92–7)	—
— Deputy Secretary of Agriculture	Xochitl Torres Small	July 17, 2023 (Confirmed July 11, 2023, 84–8)	—
— Deputy Secretary of Agriculture	Jewel H. Bronaugh	May 17, 2021 (Confirmed May 13, 2021 by voice vote)	March 3, 2023

=== Department of Commerce ===
Office	Nominee	Assumed office	Left office
— Secretary of Commerce	Gina Raimondo	March 3, 2021 (Confirmed March 2, 2021, 84–15)	—
— Deputy Secretary of Commerce	Don Graves	May 14, 2021 (Confirmed May 13, 2021, 89–7)	—

=== Department of Labor ===
Office	Nominee	Assumed office	Left office
— Secretary of Labor
— Secretary of Labor	Julie Su	March 11, 2023	—
— Secretary of Labor	Marty Walsh	March 23, 2021 (Confirmed March 22, 2021, 68–29)	March 11, 2023
— Deputy Secretary of Labor	Julie Su	July 17, 2021 (Confirmed July 13, 2021, 50–47)	—

=== Department of Health and Human Services ===
Office	Nominee	Assumed office	Left office
— Secretary of Health and Human Services	Xavier Becerra	March 19, 2021 (Confirmed March 18, 2021, 50–49)	—
— Deputy Secretary of Health and Human Services	Andrea Palm	May 12, 2021 (Confirmed May 11, 2021, 61–37)	—

=== Department of Housing and Urban Development ===
Office	Nominee	Assumed office	Left office
— Secretary of Housing and Urban Development
— Secretary of Housing and Urban Development	Adrianne Todman	March 22, 2024	–
— Secretary of Housing and Urban Development	Marcia Fudge	March 10, 2021 (Confirmed March 10, 2021, 66–34)	March 22, 2024
— Deputy Secretary of Housing and Urban Development	Adrianne Todman	June 14, 2021 (Confirmed June 10, 2021 by voice vote)	—

=== Department of Transportation ===
Office	Nominee	Assumed office	Left office
— Secretary of Transportation	Pete Buttigieg	February 3, 2021 (Confirmed February 2, 2021, 86–13)	—
— Deputy Secretary of Transportation	Polly Trottenberg	April 14, 2021 (Confirmed April 13, 2021, 82–15)	—

=== Department of Energy ===
Office	Nominee	Assumed office	Left office
— Secretary of Energy	Jennifer Granholm	February 25, 2021 (Confirmed February 25, 2021, 64–35)	—
— Deputy Secretary of Energy	David Turk	March 25, 2021 (Confirmed March 24, 2021, 98–2)	—

=== Department of Education ===
Office	Nominee	Assumed office	Left office
— Secretary of Education	Miguel Cardona	March 2, 2021 (Confirmed March 1, 2021, 64–33)	—
— Deputy Secretary of Education	Cindy Marten	May 18, 2021 (Confirmed May 11, 2021, 54–44)	—

=== Department of Veterans Affairs ===
Office	Nominee	Assumed office	Left office
— Secretary of Veterans Affairs	Denis McDonough	February 9, 2021 (Confirmed February 8, 2021, 87–7)	—
— Deputy Secretary of Veterans Affairs	Tanya J. Bradsher	September 20, 2023 (Confirmed September 12, 2023, 50–46)	—
— Deputy Secretary of Veterans Affairs	Donald Remy	July 19, 2021 (Confirmed July 15, 2021, 91–8)	April 1, 2023

=== Department of Homeland Security ===
Office	Nominee	Assumed office	Left office
— Secretary of Homeland Security	Alejandro Mayorkas	February 2, 2021 (Confirmed February 2, 2021, 56–43)	—
— Deputy Secretary of Homeland Security
— Deputy Secretary of Homeland Security	Kristie Canegallo	July 21, 2023	–
— Deputy Secretary of Homeland Security	John Tien	June 24, 2021 (Confirmed June 17, 2021, 60–34)	July 20, 2023

== Independent intelligence agencies ==
=== Office of the Director of National Intelligence ===
Office	Nominee	Assumed office	Left office
Office of the Director of National Intelligence
— Director of National Intelligence	Avril Haines	January 21, 2021 (Confirmed January 20, 2021, 84–10)	—
— Principal Deputy Director of National Intelligence	Stacey Dixon	August 4, 2021 (Confirmed August 3, 2021 by voice vote)	—
— General Counsel	Christopher Fonzone	June 24, 2021 (Confirmed June 22, 2021, 55–45)	January 5, 2024
— Chief Information Officer	Adele Merritt	January 24, 2022	December 16, 2024
— Inspector General of the Intelligence Community	Thomas Monheim	October 4, 2021 (Confirmed September 30, 2021 by voice vote)	January 3, 2025
National Counterintelligence and Security Center
— Director of the National Counterintelligence and Security Center	Michael C. Casey	September 18, 2023 (Confirmed September 12, 2023 by voice vote)	—
National Counterterrorism Center
— Director of the National Counterterrorism Center	Christine Abizaid	June 29, 2021 (Confirmed June 24, 2021 by voice vote)	July 5, 2024

=== Central Intelligence Agency ===
Office	Nominee	Assumed office	Left office
— Director of the Central Intelligence Agency	William J. Burns	March 19, 2021 (Confirmed March 18, 2021 by voice vote)	—
— Deputy Director of the Central Intelligence Agency	David S. Cohen	January 20, 2021	—
— General Counsel of the Central Intelligence Agency	Kate Heinzelman	July 14, 2022 (Confirmed July 14, 2022, 50–41)	—
— Inspector General of the Central Intelligence Agency	Robin Ashton	June 28, 2021 (Confirmed June 24, 2021 by voice vote)	December 31, 2024

== Cabinet-level independent agencies ==
=== Environmental Protection Agency ===
Office	Nominee	Assumed office	Left office
— Administrator of the Environmental Protection Agency	Michael S. Regan	March 11, 2021 (Confirmed March 10, 2021, 66–34)	December 31, 2024
— Deputy Administrator of the Environmental Protection Agency	Janet McCabe	April 29, 2021 (Confirmed April 27, 2021, 52–42)	October 4, 2024
— General Counsel of the Environmental Protection Agency	Jeffrey Prieto	November 3, 2021 (Confirmed November 3, 2021, 54–44)	—
— Chief Financial Officer of the Environmental Protection Agency	Faisal Amin	July 12, 2021 (Confirmed June 24, 2021 by voice vote)	—
— Assistant Administrator of the EPA (Air & Radiation)	Joseph Goffman	February 2, 2024 (Confirmed January 31, 2024, 50–49)	—
— Assistant Administrator of the EPA (Chemical Safety & Pollution Prevention / Toxic Substances)	Michal Freedhoff	June 17, 2021 (Confirmed June 14, 2021 by voice vote)	—
— Assistant Administrator of the EPA (Enforcement & Compliance Assurance)	David Uhlmann	July 27, 2023 (Confirmed July 20, 2023, 53–46)	—
— Assistant Administrator of the EPA (International & Tribal Affairs)	Jane Nishida	September 28, 2021 (Confirmed September 23, 2021 by voice vote)	—
— Assistant Administrator of the EPA (Research & Development)	Chris Frey	May 31, 2022 (Confirmed, May 25, 2022, 51–43)	—
— Assistant Administrator of the EPA (Water)	Radhika Fox	June 23, 2021 (Confirmed June 16, 2021, 55–43)	February 2024

=== Small Business Administration ===
Office	Nominee	Assumed office	Left office
— Administrator of the Small Business Administration	Isabel Guzman	March 17, 2021 (Confirmed March 16, 2021, 81–17)	—
— Deputy Administrator of the Small Business Administration	Dilawar Syed	July 10, 2023 (Confirmed June 8, 2023, 54–42)	—

== Other independent agencies ==
=== Federal Reserve System ===
Office	Nominee	Assumed office	Left office
— Chair of the Federal Reserve	Jerome Powell (Reappointment)	May 23, 2022 (Confirmed May 12, 2022, 80–19)	—
— Vice Chair of the Federal Reserve	Philip Jefferson	September 13, 2023 (Confirmed September 6, 2023, 88–10)	—
— Vice Chair of the Federal Reserve	Lael Brainard	May 23, 2022 (Confirmed April 26, 2022, 52–43)	February 18, 2023
— Vice Chair for Supervision of the Federal Reserve	Michael Barr	July 19, 2022 (Confirmed July 13, 2022, 66–28)	—
— Member of the Federal Reserve Board of Governors	Lisa Cook		
— Member of the Federal Reserve Board of Governors	Lisa Cook	May 23, 2022 (Confirmed May 10, 2022, 51–50); Vice President Harris cast tie-breaking vote	—
— Member of the Federal Reserve Board of Governors	Lisa Cook	Reappointment (Confirmed September 6, 2023, 51–47)	—
— Member of the Federal Reserve Board of Governors	Philip Jefferson	May 23, 2022 (Confirmed May 11, 2022, 91–7)	—
— Member of the Federal Reserve Board of Governors	Michael Barr	July 19, 2022 (Confirmed July 13, 2022, 66–28)	—
— Member of the Federal Reserve Board of Governors	Adriana Kugler	September 13, 2023 (Confirmed September 7, 2023, 53–45)	—

=== National Aeronautics and Space Administration ===
Office	Nominee	Assumed office	Left office
— Administrator of NASA	Bill Nelson	May 3, 2021 (Confirmed April 29, 2021 by voice vote)	—
— Deputy Administrator of NASA	Pamela Melroy	June 21, 2021 (Confirmed June 17, 2021 by voice vote)	—
— Executive Secretary of the National Space Council	Chirag Parikh	August 2, 2021	—
— Chief Financial Officer of NASA	Margaret Vo Schaus	August 4, 2021 (Confirmed July 30, 2021 by voice vote)	—

=== National Foundation on the Arts and the Humanities ===
Office	Nominee	Assumed office	Left office
National Endowment for the Arts
— Chair of the National Endowment for the Arts	Maria Rosario Jackson	January 26, 2022 (Confirmed December 18, 2021 by voice vote)	—
— Member of the National Council on the Arts	Ismael Ahmed	March 25, 2022 (Confirmed December 18, 2021 by voice vote)	—
— Member of the National Council on the Arts	Huascar Medina	March 25, 2022 (Confirmed December 18, 2021 by voice vote)	—
— Member of the National Council on the Arts	Kamilah Forbes	March 25, 2022 (Confirmed February 17, 2022 by voice vote)	—
— Member of the National Council on the Arts	Christopher Morgan	May 23, 2022 (Confirmed March 15, 2022 by voice vote)	—
— Member of the National Council on the Arts	Kinan Azmeh	May 23, 2022 (Confirmed March 15, 2022 by voice vote)	—
— Member of the National Council on the Arts	Jake Shimabukuro	May 23, 2022 (Confirmed March 15, 2022 by voice vote)	—
— Member of the National Council on the Arts	Constance Williams	May 23, 2022 (Confirmed March 15, 2022 by voice vote)	—
— Member of the National Council on the Arts	Bidtah Becker	May 23, 2022 (Confirmed March 17, 2022 by voice vote)	—
— Member of the National Council on the Arts	Gretchen Gonzalez Davidson	May 23, 2022 (Confirmed March 17, 2022 by voice vote)	—
— Member of the National Council on the Arts	Fiona Whelan Prine	May 31, 2022 (Confirmed March 23, 2022 by voice vote)	—
— Member of the National Council on the Arts	Michael Lombardo	October 28, 2022 (Confirmed September 29, 2022 by voice vote)	—
National Endowment for the Humanities
— Chair of the National Endowment for the Humanities	Shelly Lowe	February 14, 2022 (Confirmed February 2, 2022 by voice vote)	—
— Member of the National Council on the Humanities	Daryl Baldwin	October 1, 2021 (Confirmed September 30, 2021 by voice vote)	—
— Member of the National Council on the Humanities	Genine Macks Fidler	October 1, 2021 (Confirmed September 30, 2021 by voice vote)	—
— Member of the National Council on the Humanities	Lynnette Overby	February 4, 2022 (Confirmed December 18, 2021 by voice vote)	—
— Member of the National Council on the Humanities	Kit Matthew	May 23, 2022 (Confirmed March 15, 2022 by voice vote)	—
— Member of the National Council on the Humanities	Vanessa Northington Gamble	May 23, 2022 (Confirmed March 17, 2022 by voice vote)	—
— Member of the National Council on the Humanities	David Hajdu	May 23, 2022 (Confirmed March 17, 2022 by voice vote)	—
— Member of the National Council on the Humanities	Beverly Gage	May 23, 2022 (Confirmed March 23, 2022 by voice vote)	—
— Member of the National Council on the Humanities	Christine Kim	June 15, 2022 (Confirmed May 19, 2022 by voice vote)	—
— Member of the National Council on the Humanities	Karen Stout	June 15, 2022 (Confirmed May 19, 2022 by voice vote)	—
— Member of the National Council on the Humanities	Deborah Coen	July 21, 2022 (Confirmed July 21, 2022 by voice vote)	—
— Member of the National Council on the Humanities	David K. Sing	December 18, 2023 (Confirmed December 18, 2023 by voice vote)	—

=== Office of Personnel Management ===
Office	Nominee	Assumed office	Left office
— Director of the Office of Personnel Management
— Director of the Office of Personnel Management	Rob Shriver	May 6, 2024	—
— Director of the Office of Personnel Management	Kiran Ahuja	June 24, 2021 (Confirmed June 22, 2021, 51–50); Vice President Harris cast tie-breaking vote	May 6, 2024
— Deputy Director of the Office of Personnel Management	Rob Shriver	December 20, 2022 (Confirmed December 20, 2022, 57–35)	—
— Inspector General of the Office of Personnel Management	Krista Boyd	April 28, 2022 (Confirmed April 6, 2022 by voice vote)	—

=== United States Agency for International Development ===
Office	Nominee	Assumed office	Left office
— Administrator of USAID	Samantha Power	May 3, 2021 (Confirmed April 28, 2021, 68–26)	—
— Deputy Administrator of USAID (Management & Resources)	Paloma Adams-Allen	October 12, 2021 (Confirmed October 5, 2021, 79–20)	April 30, 2024
— Deputy Administrator of USAID (Policy & Programming)	Isobel Coleman	November 15, 2021 (Confirmed November 3, 2021, 59–39)	—
— Assistant Administrator of USAID (Africa)	Monde Muyangwa	September 1, 2022 (Confirmed August 6, 2022, by voice vote)	—
— Assistant Administrator of USAID (Asia)	Michael Schiffer	October 3, 2022 (Confirmed September 15, 2022 by voice vote)	—
— Assistant Administrator of USAID (Europe & Eurasia)	Erin Elizabeth McKee	April 29, 2022 (Confirmed March 24, 2022 by voice vote)	—
— Assistant Administrator of USAID (Global Health)	Atul Gawande	January 4, 2022 (Confirmed December 17, 2021, 48–31)	—
— Assistant Administrator of USAID (Latin America & the Caribbean)	Marcela Escobari	January 13, 2022 (Confirmed December 18, 2021 by voice vote)	April 10, 2024
— Assistant Administrator of USAID (Legislative & Public Affairs)	Jodi Herman	April 19, 2022 (Confirmed March 24, 2022, by voice vote)	May 2024
— Inspector General of USAID	Paul K. Martin	January 2, 2024 (Confirmed December 18, 2023, by voice vote)	—

=== United States Trade and Development Agency ===
Office	Nominee	Assumed office	Left office
— Director of the United States Trade and Development Agency	Enoh T. Ebong	April 6, 2022 (Confirmed March 31, 2022 by voice vote)	—

=== Federal regional agencies ===
Office	Nominee	Assumed office	Left office
Appalachian Regional Commission
— Federal Co-Chair of the Appalachian Regional Commission	Gayle Conelly Manchin	May 6, 2021 (Confirmed April 14, 2021 by voice vote)	—
Delta Regional Authority
— Federal Co-Chair of the Delta Regional Authority	Corey Wiggins	March 16, 2022 (Confirmed March 10, 2022 by voice vote)	—
— Alternate Federal Co-Chair of the Delta Regional Authority	Leslie Durham	October 22, 2021	October 1, 2022
Northern Border Regional Commission
— Federal Co-Chair of the Northern Border Regional Commission	Chris Saunders	April 11, 2022 (Confirmed March 24, 2022 by voice vote)	—
Southeast Crescent Regional Commission
— Federal Co-Chair of the Southeast Crescent Regional Commission	Jennifer Clyburn Reed	December 9, 2021 (Confirmed December 8, 2021 by voice vote)	—
Southwest Border Regional Commission
— Federal Co-Chair of the Southwest Border Regional Commission	Juan Eduardo Sanchez	December 9, 2022 (Confirmed December 6, 2022 by voice vote)	—

=== Independent banks ===
Office	Nominee	Assumed office	Left office
African Development Bank
— U.S. Director of the African Development Bank	Oren Whyche-Shaw	May 26, 2022 (Confirmed April 7, 2022 by voice vote)	June 2023
Asian Development Bank
— U.S. Director of the Asian Development Bank	Chantale Wong	February 23, 2022 (Confirmed February 8, 2022, 66–31)	—
European Bank for Reconstruction and Development
— U.S. Alternate Governor of the European Bank for Reconstruction and Development	Jose W. Fernandez	2021 (Confirmed August 5, 2021 by voice vote)	—
Export–Import Bank of the United States
— President and Chair of EXIM	Reta Jo Lewis	February 16, 2022 (Confirmed February 9, 2022, 56–40)	—
— First Vice President and Vice Chair of EXIM	Judith Pryor	April 5, 2022 (Confirmed March 30, 2022, 69–30)	—
— Member of the Board of Directors of EXIM
— Member of the Board of Directors of EXIM	Owen Herrnstadt	July 15, 2022 (Confirmed, July 13, 2022, 51–44)	—
— Member of the Board of Directors of EXIM	Spencer Bachus (Reappointment)	January 3, 2024 (Confirmed December 20, 2023 by voice vote)	—
— Inspector General of EXIM	Parisa Salehi	March 14, 2022 (Confirmed February 17, 2022 by voice vote)	—
Inter-American Development Bank
— U.S. Alternate Governor of the IDB	Jose W. Fernandez	2021 (Confirmed August 5, 2021 by voice vote)	—
— Alternate Executive Director of the IDB	Maria Fabiana Jorge	June 15, 2022 (Confirmed May 17, 2022 by voice vote)	—
International Bank for Reconstruction and Development
— U.S. Alternate Governor of the International Bank for Reconstruction and Development	Jose W. Fernandez	2021 (Confirmed August 5, 2021 by voice vote)	—
— U.S. Executive Director of the International Bank for Reconstruction and Development	Adriana Kugler	May 29, 2022 (Confirmed April 7, 2022 by voice vote)	September 13, 2023
— U.S. Alternate Executive Director of the International Bank for Reconstruction and Development	L. Felice Gorordo	September 2023 (Confirmed May 10, 2023, 52–45)	—

=== Independent boards ===
Office	Nominee	Assumed office	Left office
Chemical Safety and Hazard Investigation Board
— Chair of the CSB	Steve Owens	January 5, 2023 (Confirmed December 13, 2022 by voice vote)	—
— Member of the CSB	Sylvia Johnson	February 2, 2022 (Confirmed December 9, 2021 by voice vote)	—
— Member of the CSB	Steve Owens	February 2, 2022 (Confirmed December 9, 2021 by voice vote)	—
— Member of the CSB	Catherine Sandoval	February 2, 2023 (Confirmed December 13, 2022 by voice vote)	—
Civil Rights Cold Case Records Review Board
— Member of the Civil Rights Cold Case Records Review Board	Margaret Burnham	February 17, 2022 (Confirmed February 17, 2022 by voice vote)	—
— Member of the Civil Rights Cold Case Records Review Board	Gabrielle Dudley	February 17, 2022 (Confirmed February 17, 2022 by voice vote)	—
— Member of the Civil Rights Cold Case Records Review Board	Hank Klibanoff	February 17, 2022 (Confirmed February 17, 2022 by voice vote)	—
— Member of the Civil Rights Cold Case Records Review Board	Brenda Elaine Stevenson	February 17, 2022 (Confirmed February 17, 2022 by voice vote)	—
Defense Nuclear Facilities Safety Board
— Chair of the Defense Nuclear Facilities Safety Board	Joyce L. Connery	January 20, 2021	—
— Member of the Defense Nuclear Facilities Safety Board	Patricia L. Lee	September 4, 2024 (Confirmed July 9, 2024, 54–41)	—
Federal Retirement Thrift Investment Board
— Chair of the Federal Retirement Thrift Investment Board	Mike Gerber	June 28, 2022	—
— Member of the Federal Retirement Thrift Investment Board	Mike Gerber	June 28, 2022 (Confirmed June 9, 2022 by voice vote)	—
— Member of the Federal Retirement Thrift Investment Board	Dana Bilyeu (Reappointment)	June 28, 2022 (Confirmed June 9, 2022 by voice vote)	—
— Member of the Federal Retirement Thrift Investment Board	Leona Bridges	June 28, 2022 (Confirmed June 9, 2022 by voice vote)	—
— Member of the Federal Retirement Thrift Investment Board	Stacie Olivares	June 28, 2022 (Confirmed June 9, 2022 by voice vote)	—
Merit Systems Protection Board
— Chair of the MSPB	Cathy Harris	March 14, 2024 (Confirmed March 6, 2024, 51–48)	—
— Member of the MSPB	Raymond Limon	March 4, 2022 (Confirmed March 1, 2022 by voice vote)	—
— Member of the MSPB	Cathy Harris	June 1, 2022 (Confirmed May 25, 2022, 48–46)	—
— Member of the MSPB	Henry Kerner	June 3, 2024 (Confirmed May 14, 2024 by voice vote)	—
— Member of the MSPB	Tristan Leavitt	March 4, 2022 (Confirmed March 1, 2022 by voice vote)	February 28, 2023
National Labor Relations Board
— General Counsel of the National Labor Relations Board	Jennifer Abruzzo	July 22, 2021 (Confirmed July 21, 2021, 51–50); Vice President Harris cast tie-breaking vote	—
— Chair of the NLRB	Gwynne Wilcox	December 17, 2024	–
— Chair of the NLRB	Lauren McFerran	January 20, 2021	December 16, 2024
— Member of the NLRB	Gwynne Wilcox	August 4, 2021 (Confirmed July 28, 2021, 52–47)	—
— Member of the NLRB	Gwynne Wilcox	Reappointment (Confirmed September 6, 2023, 51–48)	—
— Member of the NLRB	David Prouty	August 28, 2021 (Confirmed July 28, 2021, 53–46)	—
National Mediation Board
— Member of the National Mediation Board
— Member of the National Mediation Board	Deirdre Hamilton	January 25, 2022 (Confirmed December 7, 2021, 52–48)	—
— Member of the National Mediation Board	Deirdre Hamilton	Reappointment (Confirmed March 7, 2024 by voice vote)	—
— Member of the National Mediation Board	Linda Puchala (Reappointment)	March 7, 2024 (Confirmed March 7, 2024 by voice vote)	—
— Member of the National Mediation Board	Loren Sweatt	April 2, 2024 (Confirmed March 7, 2024 by voice vote)	—
National Transportation Safety Board
— Chair of the NTSB
— Chair of the NTSB	Jennifer Homendy	August 13, 2021 (Confirmed August 9, 2021 by voice vote)	—
— Chair of the NTSB	Jennifer Homendy	Reappointment (Confirmed May 14, 2024 by voice vote)	—
— Vice Chair of the NTSB	Alvin Brown	December 20, 2024	—
— Member of the NTSB	Alvin Brown	March 13, 2024 (Confirmed March 8, 2024 by voice vote)	—
— Member of the NTSB	J. Todd Inman	March 13, 2024 (Confirmed March 8, 2024 by voice vote)	—
— Member of the NTSB	Jennifer Homendy (Reappointment)	May 14, 2024 (Confirmed May 14, 2024 by voice vote)	–
Privacy and Civil Liberties Oversight Board
— Chair and Member of the PCLOB	Sharon Bradford Franklin	February 23, 2022 (Confirmed February 7, 2022 by voice vote)	—
— Member of the PCLOB	Beth Ann Williams	February 23, 2022 (Confirmed February 7, 2022 by voice vote)	—
— Member of the PCLOB	Travis LeBlanc (Reappointment)	October 11, 2022 (Confirmed September 14, 2022 by voice vote)	—
— Member of the PCLOB	Richard E. DiZinno	September 27, 2022 (Confirmed September 14, 2022 by voice vote)	December 2023
Public Buildings Reform Board
— Member of the Public Buildings Reform Board	Jeffrey Gural	November 10, 2022	—
— Member of the Public Buildings Reform Board	Mike Capuano	November 10, 2022	—
— Member of the Public Buildings Reform Board	Dan Mathews	February 9, 2024	–
Surface Transportation Board
— Chair of the Surface Transportation Board	Robert E. Primus	May 11, 2024	—
— Chair of the Surface Transportation Board	Martin J. Oberman	January 21, 2021	May 10, 2024
— Member of the Surface Transportation Board	Karen Hedlund	January 3, 2022 (Confirmed December 16, 2021 by voice vote)	—
— Member of the Surface Transportation Board	Robert E. Primus (Reappointment)	January 12, 2023 (Confirmed December 20, 2022 by voice vote)	—
— Member of the Surface Transportation Board	Patrick Fuchs (Reappointment)	May 14, 2024 (Confirmed May 14, 2024 by voice vote)	—
Board of Governors of the United States Postal Service
— Member of the USPS Board of Governors	Amber McReynolds	June 16, 2021 (Confirmed May 13, 2021, 59–38)	—
— Member of the USPS Board of Governors	Anton Hajjar	June 16, 2021 (Confirmed May 28, 2021 by voice vote)	December 8, 2024
— Member of the USPS Board of Governors	Ron Stroman	June 16, 2021 (Confirmed May 12, 2021, 69–30)	—
— Member of the USPS Board of Governors	Dan Tangherlini	May 20, 2022; Confirmed May 12, 2022 by voice vote)	—
— Member of the USPS Board of Governors	Derek Kan	May 20, 2022; Confirmed May 12, 2022 by voice vote)	—

=== Independent commissions ===
Office	Nominee	Assumed office	Left office
AbilityOne Commission
— Commissioner of the AbilityOne Commission	Bryan Bashin (Private Citizen)	July 30, 2021	—
— Commissioner of the AbilityOne Commission	Christina Brandt (Private Citizen)	July 30, 2021	—
— Commissioner of the AbilityOne Commission	Gabriel Cazares (Private Citizen)	July 30, 2021	—
— Commissioner of the AbilityOne Commission	Chai Feldblum (Private Citizen)	July 30, 2021	—
— Commissioner of the AbilityOne Commission	Malcom A. Shorter (Department of Agriculture)	October 18, 2022	—
— Commissioner of the AbilityOne Commission	Megan Dake (Department of the Army)	October 18, 2022	—
— Commissioner of the AbilityOne Commission	Matthew R. Beebe (Department of Defense)	October 18, 2022	—
— Commissioner of the AbilityOne Commission	Carol L. Dobak (Department of Education)	October 18, 2022	—
— Commissioner of the AbilityOne Commission	Tara M. Jamison (Department of Justice)	October 18, 2022	—
— Commissioner of the AbilityOne Commission	Robert D. Hogue (Department of the Navy)	October 18, 2022	—
— Commissioner of the AbilityOne Commission	Angela Billups (Department of Veterans Affairs)	October 18, 2022	—
— Commissioner of the AbilityOne Commission	Scott Calisti (Department of the Air Force)	July 19, 2023	—
American Battle Monuments Commission
— Secretary of the American Battle Monuments Commission	Charles K. Djou	June 2022	—
— Chairman and Commissioner of the American Battle Monuments Commission	Michael X. Garrett	August 1, 2023	—
— Chairman and Commissioner of the American Battle Monuments Commission	Mark Hertling	December 13, 2021	March 2023
— Commissioner of the American Battle Monuments Commission	Darrell Dorgan	September 29, 2021	—
— Commissioner of the American Battle Monuments Commission	John L. Estrada	September 29, 2021	—
— Commissioner of the American Battle Monuments Commission	Florent Groberg	September 29, 2021	—
— Commissioner of the American Battle Monuments Commission	Amy Looney Heffernan	September 29, 2021	—
— Commissioner of the American Battle Monuments Commission	Matthew E. Jones	September 29, 2021	—
— Commissioner of the American Battle Monuments Commission	Raymond D. Kemp, Sr.	September 29, 2021	—
— Commissioner of the American Battle Monuments Commission	Bud D. Pettigrew	September 29, 2021	—
— Commissioner of the American Battle Monuments Commission	Michael E. Smith	September 29, 2021	—
— Commissioner of the American Battle Monuments Commission	Gail Berry West	September 29, 2021	—
— Commissioner of the American Battle Monuments Commission	Daniel P. Woodward	September 29, 2021	—
Arctic Research Commission
— Chair and Commissioner of the Arctic Research Commission	Michael Sfraga	September 24, 2021	—
— Commissioner of the Arctic Research Commission	Elizabeth Ann Cravalho	September 24, 2021	—
— Commissioner of the Arctic Research Commission	David Michael Kennedy	September 24, 2021	—
— Commissioner of the Arctic Research Commission	Mark Myers	September 24, 2021	—
— Commissioner of the Arctic Research Commission	Jackie A. Richter-Menge	September 24, 2021	—
— Commissioner of the Arctic Research Commission	Deborah Vo	September 24, 2021	—
— Commissioner of the Arctic Research Commission	Nikoosh Carlo	April 5, 2022	—
Commission of Fine Arts
— Member of the Commission of Fine Arts	Billie Tsien	June 9, 2021	—
— Member of the Commission of Fine Arts	Hazel Ruth Edwards	June 9, 2021	—
— Member of the Commission of Fine Arts	Peter D. Cook	June 9, 2021	—
— Member of the Commission of Fine Arts	Justin Garrett Moore	June 9, 2021	—
— Member of the Commission of Fine Arts	Lisa E. Delplace	April 7, 2022	—
— Member of the Commission of Fine Arts	Bruce Redman Becker	May 10, 2024	—
— Member of the Commission of Fine Arts	William J. Lenihan	May 10, 2024	—
Commodity Futures Trading Commission
— Chair of the CFTC	Rostin Behnam	January 4, 2022 (Confirmed December 15, 2021 by voice vote)	—
— Commissioner of the CFTC	Rostin Behnam (Reappointment)	December 15, 2021 (Confirmed December 15, 2021 by voice vote)	—
— Commissioner of the CFTC	Kristin Johnson	March 30, 2022 (Confirmed March 28, 2022 by voice vote)	—
— Commissioner of the CFTC	Christy Goldsmith Romero	March 30, 2022 (Confirmed March 28, 2022 by voice vote)	—
— Commissioner of the CFTC	Summer Mersinger	March 31, 2022 (Confirmed March 28, 2022 by voice vote)	—
— Commissioner of the CFTC	Summer Mersinger	Reappointment (Confirmed February 26, 2024 by voice vote)	—
— Commissioner of the CFTC	Caroline Pham	April 14, 2022 (Confirmed March 28, 2022 by voice vote)	—
Consumer Product Safety Commission
— Chair of the Consumer Product Safety Commission	Alexander Hoehn-Saric	October 12, 2021 (Confirmed October 7, 2021 by voice vote)	—
— Commissioner of the Consumer Product Safety Commission	Alexander Hoehn-Saric	October 12, 2021 (Confirmed October 7, 2021 by voice vote)	—
— Commissioner of the Consumer Product Safety Commission	Richard Trumka Jr.	December 2, 2021 (Confirmed November 16, 2021 by voice vote)	—
— Commissioner of the Consumer Product Safety Commission	Mary Boyle	June 30, 2022 (Confirmed June 22, 2022, 50–48)	—
— Commissioner of the Consumer Product Safety Commission	Douglas Dziak	March 25, 2024 (Confirmed March 7, 2024 by voice vote)	—
Equal Employment Opportunity Commission
— General Counsel of the EEOC	Karla Gilbride	October 23, 2023 (Confirmed October 17, 2023, 50–46)	—
— Chair of the EEOC	Charlotte Burrows	January 20, 2021	—
— Commissioner of the EEOC	Jocelyn Samuels (Reappointment)	July 2021 (Confirmed July 14, 2021, 52–47)	—
— Commissioner of the EEOC	Kalpana Kotagal	August 9, 2023 (Confirmed July 13, 2023, 49–47)	—
— Commissioner of the EEOC	Charlotte Burrows (Reappointment)	November 8, 2023 (Confirmed November 8, 2023, 51–47)	—
Federal Communications Commission
— Chair of the FCC	Jessica Rosenworcel	October 26, 2021	—
— Commissioner of the FCC	Jessica Rosenworcel (Reappointment)	December 7, 2021 (Confirmed December 7, 2021, 68–31)	—
— Commissioner of the FCC	Anna M. Gomez	September 25, 2023 (Confirmed September 7, 2023, 55–43)	—
— Commissioner of the FCC	Geoffrey Starks (Reappointment)	September 30, 2023 (Confirmed September 30, 2023 by voice vote)	—
— Commissioner of the FCC	Brendan Carr (Reappointment)	September 30, 2023 (Confirmed September 30, 2023 by voice vote)	—
— Inspector General of the FCC	Fara Damelin	March 25, 2024 (Confirmed March 7, 2024 by voice vote)	—
Federal Election Commission
— Commissioner of the FEC	Dara Lindenbaum	August 2, 2022 (Confirmed May 24, 2022, 54–38)	—
Federal Maritime Commission
— Chair of the Federal Maritime Commission	Dan Maffei	March 29, 2021	—
— Commissioner of the Federal Maritime Commission	Max Vekich	February 15, 2022 (Confirmed February 10, 2022, 51–43)	—
— Commissioner of the Federal Maritime Commission	Dan Maffei (Reappointment)	May 14, 2024 (Confirmed May 14, 2024 by voice vote)	–
— Commissioner of the Federal Maritime Commission	Rebecca F. Dye (Reappointment)	May 14, 2024 (Confirmed May 14, 2024 by voice vote)	—
Federal Mine Safety and Health Review Commission
— Chair of the Federal Mine Safety and Health Review Commission	Mary Lu Jordan	October 21, 2022	—
— Commissioner of the Federal Mine Safety and Health Review Commission	Mary Lu Jordan (Reappointment)	October 12, 2022 (Confirmed September 29, 2022 by voice vote)	—
— Commissioner of the Federal Mine Safety and Health Review Commission	Timothy J. Baker	October 12, 2022 (Confirmed September 29, 2022 by voice vote)	—
— Commissioner of the Federal Mine Safety and Health Review Commission	Moshe Marvit	March 25, 2024 (Confirmed March 6, 2024, 50–49)	—
Federal Trade Commission
— Chair of the FTC	Lina Khan	June 15, 2021	—
— Commissioner of the FTC	Lina Khan	June 15, 2021 (Confirmed June 15, 2021, 69–28)	—
— Commissioner of the FTC	Alvaro Bedoya	May 16, 2022 (Confirmed May 11, 2022, 51–50) (Vice President Harris cast tie-breaking vote)	—
— Commissioner of the FTC	Rebecca Slaughter (Reappointment)	March 7, 2024 (Confirmed March 7, 2024 by voice vote)	—
— Commissioner of the FTC	Melissa Holyoak	March 25, 2024 (Confirmed March 7, 2024 by voice vote)	—
— Commissioner of the FTC	Andrew N. Ferguson	April 2, 2024 (Confirmed March 7, 2024 by voice vote)	—
International Boundary and Water Commission
— Commissioner of the IBWC	Maria-Elena Giner	August 23, 2021	—
International Joint Commission
— Commissioner of the International Joint Commission	Gerald H. Acker	July 2023 (Confirmed July 27, 2023 by voice vote)	—
— Commissioner of the International Joint Commission	Robert David Gioia	May 2024 (Confirmed May 2, 2024 by voice vote)	—
International Trade Commission
— Chair of the ITC	Amy Karpel	June 20, 2024	—
Marine Mammal Commission
— Commissioner of the Marine Mammal Commission	Sue Moore	January 9, 2023 (Confirmed December 22, 2022 by voice vote)	—
— Commissioner of the Marine Mammal Commission	Andrew J. Read	January 9, 2023 (Confirmed December 22, 2022 by voice vote)	—
National Capital Planning Commission
— Chair and Commissioner of the National Capital Planning Commission	Teri Hawks Goodmann	January 26, 2023	—
— Commissioner of the National Capital Planning Commission	Elizabeth M. Hewlett	November 10, 2022	—
— Commissioner of the National Capital Planning Commission	Bryan C. Green	November 10, 2022	—
Nuclear Regulatory Commission
— Chair of the NRC	Christopher T. Hanson	January 20, 2021	—
— Commissioner of the NRC
— Commissioner of the NRC	Annie Caputo (Reappointment)	August 9, 2022 (Confirmed August 2, 2022 by voice vote)	—
— Commissioner of the NRC	Bradley R. Crowell	August 26, 2022 (Confirmed August 2, 2022 by voice vote)	—
— Commissioner of the NRC	Christopher T. Hanson (Reappointment)	June 4, 2024 (Confirmed June 4, 2024, 81–17)	—
— Commissioner of the NRC	Matthew Marzano	January 8, 2025 (Confirmed December 12, 2024, 50–45)	—
Postal Regulatory Commission
— Chair of the Postal Regulatory Commission	Michael Kubayanda	January 25, 2021	—
— Commissioner of the Postal Regulatory Commission
— Commissioner of the Postal Regulatory Commission	Michael Kubayanda (Reappointment)	December 9, 2021 (Confirmed December 7, 2021 by voice vote)	—
— Commissioner of the Postal Regulatory Commission	Robert G. Taub (Reappointment)	September 28, 2023 (Confirmed September 28, 2023 by voice vote)	—
— Commissioner of the Postal Regulatory Commission	Thomas G. Day	October 12, 2023 (Confirmed September 28, 2023 by voice vote)	—
— Commissioner of the Postal Regulatory Commission	Ann C. Fisher (Reappointment)	September 25, 2024 (Confirmed September 25, 2024 by voice vote)	—
— Commissioner of the Postal Regulatory Commission	Ashley Poling (Reappointment)	September 25, 2024 (Confirmed September 25, 2024 by voice vote)	—
Securities and Exchange Commission
— Chair of the SEC	Gary Gensler	April 17, 2021	—
— Member of the SEC	Gary Gensler	April 17, 2021 (Confirmed April 14, 2021, 53–45)	—
— Member of the SEC	Mark Uyeda	June 30, 2022 (Confirmed June 16, 2022 by voice vote)	—
— Member of the SEC	Mark Uyeda	Reappointment (Confirmed December 20, 2023 by voice vote)	—
— Member of the SEC	Jaime Lizárraga	July 18, 2022 (Confirmed June 16, 2022 by voice vote)	—
Semiquincentennial Commission
— Chair of the Semiquincentennial Commission	Rosie Rios	July 2022	—
Sentencing Commission
— Chair of the U.S. Sentencing Commission	Carlton W. Reeves	August 5, 2022 (Confirmed August 4, 2022 by voice vote)	—
— Commissioner of the U.S. Sentencing Commission	Carlton W. Reeves	August 5, 2022 (Confirmed August 4, 2022 by voice vote)	—
— Commissioner of the U.S. Sentencing Commission	Laura Mate	August 5, 2022 (Confirmed August 4, 2022 by voice vote)	–
— Commissioner of the U.S. Sentencing Commission	Claire McCusker Murray	August 5, 2022 (Confirmed August 4, 2022 by voice vote)	–
— Commissioner of the U.S. Sentencing Commission	Luis Felipe Restrepo	August 5, 2022 (Confirmed August 4, 2022 by voice vote)	–
— Commissioner of the U.S. Sentencing Commission	Claria Horn Boom	August 5, 2022 (Confirmed August 4, 2022 by voice vote)	–
— Commissioner of the U.S. Sentencing Commission	John Gleeson	August 5, 2022 (Confirmed August 4, 2022 by voice vote)	–
— Commissioner of the U.S. Sentencing Commission	Candice C. Wong	August 5, 2022 (Confirmed August 4, 2022 by voice vote)	–

=== Independent foundations ===
Office	Nominee	Assumed office	Left office
Barry M. Goldwater Scholarship Foundation
— Member of the Board of Trustees of the Barry M. Goldwater Scholarship Foundation	Dennis DeConcini	January 3, 2022 (Confirmed December 18, 2021 by voice vote)	—
— Member of the Board of Trustees of the Barry M. Goldwater Scholarship Foundation	Joseph Green	January 3, 2022 (Confirmed December 18, 2021 by voice vote)	—
— Member of the Board of Trustees of the Barry M. Goldwater Scholarship Foundation	Joseph Green	Reappointment (Confirmed September 29, 2022 by voice vote)	—
Harry S. Truman Scholarship Foundation
— Member of the Board of Trustees of the Harry S. Truman Scholarship Foundation
— Member of the Board of Trustees of the Harry S. Truman Scholarship Foundation	Betty Jang	May 23, 2022 (Confirmed February 17, 2022 by voice vote)	—
— Member of the Board of Trustees of the Harry S. Truman Scholarship Foundation	Betty Jang	Reappointment (Confirmed December 13, 2023 by voice vote)	—
— Member of the Board of Trustees of the Harry S. Truman Scholarship Foundation	Stacey Brandenburg	May 23, 2022 (Confirmed March 24, 2022 by voice vote)	—
— Member of the Board of Trustees of the Harry S. Truman Scholarship Foundation	Audrey Schuster	September 29, 2022 (Confirmed September 29, 2022 by voice vote)	—
— Member of the Board of Trustees of the Harry S. Truman Scholarship Foundation	Todd Gloria	December 2023 (Confirmed December 14, 2023 by voice vote)	—
James Madison Memorial Fellowship Foundation
— Member of the Board of Trustees of the James Madison Memorial Fellowship Foundation	Terrence K. Wright	May 6, 2022 (Confirmed March 24, 2022 by voice vote)	—
— Member of the Board of Trustees of the James Madison Memorial Fellowship Foundation	Laura Dove	April 29, 2024 (Confirmed December 13, 2023 by voice vote)	—
— Member of the Board of Trustees of the James Madison Memorial Fellowship Foundation	Bradford P. Wilson	April 25, 2024 (Confirmed December 20, 2023 by voice vote)	—
Morris K. Udall and Stewart L. Udall Foundation
— Member of the Board of Trustees of the Morris K. Udall and Stewart L. Udall Foundation
— Member of the Board of Trustees of the Morris K. Udall and Stewart L. Udall Foundation	Denis Udall	May 31, 2022 (Confirmed May 26, 2022 by voice vote)	—
— Member of the Board of Trustees of the Morris K. Udall and Stewart L. Udall Foundation	Tess Udall	May 31, 2022 (Confirmed May 26, 2022 by voice vote)	—
— Member of the Board of Trustees of the Morris K. Udall and Stewart L. Udall Foundation	Tadd M. Johnson (Reappointment)	December 20, 2023 (Confirmed December 20, 2023 by voice vote)	—
— Member of the Board of Trustees of the Morris K. Udall and Stewart L. Udall Foundation	Rion J. Ramirez	December 2023 (Confirmed December 20, 2023 by voice vote)	—
— Member of the Board of Trustees of the Morris K. Udall and Stewart L. Udall Foundation	Heather M. Cahoon	September 2024 (Confirmed September 11, 2024 by voice vote)	—

=== Independent miscellaneous ===
Office	Nominee	Assumed office	Left office
Administrative Conference of the United States
— Chair of the Administrative Conference of the United States	Andrew Fois	May 31, 2022 (Confirmed May 26, 2022 by voice vote)	—
— Vice-Chair of the Council of the Administrative Conference of the United States	Nitin Shah	September 28, 2022	—
— Vice-Chair of the Council of the Administrative Conference of the United States	Matthew L. Wiener	February 23, 2021	July 22, 2022
— Member of the Council of the Administrative Conference of the United States	Leslie Kiernan	September 30, 2021	—
— Member of the Council of the Administrative Conference of the United States	Funmi Olorunnipa Badejo	September 30, 2021	—
— Member of the Council of the Administrative Conference of the United States	Nitin Shah	September 30, 2021	—
— Member of the Council of the Administrative Conference of the United States	Fernando Laguarda	September 28, 2022	—
— Member of the Council of the Administrative Conference of the United States	Anne Joseph O'Connell	September 28, 2022	—
— Member of the Council of the Administrative Conference of the United States	Kristen Clarke	October 14, 2022	—
— Member of the Council of the Administrative Conference of the United States	Jonathan Su	October 14, 2022	—
— Member of the Council of the Administrative Conference of the United States	Shakuntla Bhaya	November 15, 2023	
— Member of the Council of the Administrative Conference of the United States	Damon Y. Smith	September 6, 2024	—
— Member of the Council of the Administrative Conference of the United States	Neil MacBride	November 15, 2023	June 28, 2024
— Member of the Council of the Administrative Conference of the United States	Matthew L. Wiener	February 23, 2021	July 22, 2022
Advisory Council on Historic Preservation
— Chair of the Advisory Council on Historic Preservation	Sara Bronin	January 31, 2023 (Confirmed December 22, 2022 by voice vote)	—
AmeriCorps (formerly Corporation for National and Community Service)
— Chief Executive Officer of AmeriCorps	Michael D. Smith	January 5, 2022 (Confirmed December 8, 2021, 58–41)	—
— Member of the Board of Directors of AmeriCorps	Catherine McLaughlin	May 13, 2022 (Confirmed December 18, 2021 by voice vote)	—
— Member of the Board of Directors of AmeriCorps	Fagan Harris	May 13, 2022 (Confirmed December 18, 2021 by voice vote)	—
— Member of the Board of Directors of AmeriCorps	Alvin Warren	May 13, 2022 (Confirmed March 23, 2022 by voice vote)	October 2024
— Member of the Board of Directors of AmeriCorps	Flor Romero	May 31, 2022; Confirmed May 19, 2022 by voice vote)	—
— Member of the Board of Directors of AmeriCorps	Leslie Bluhm	July 27, 2022 (Confirmed July 21, 2022 by voice vote)	—
— Member of the Board of Directors of AmeriCorps	Lisette Nieves	July 27, 2022 (Confirmed July 21, 2022 by voice vote)	—
— Member of the Board of Directors of AmeriCorps	Shirley Sagawa	August 11, 2022 (Confirmed August 4, 2022 by voice vote)	—
Consumer Financial Protection Bureau
— Director of the Consumer Financial Protection Bureau	Rohit Chopra	October 12, 2021 (Confirmed September 30, 2021, 50–48)	—
Farm Credit Administration
— Member of the Farm Credit Administration	Vincent Logan	October 13, 2022 (Confirmed September 29, 2022 by voice vote)	—
Federal Deposit Insurance Corporation
— Chair of the Board of Directors of the FDIC	Martin J. Gruenberg	January 5, 2023 (Confirmed December 19, 2022 by voice vote)	—
— Vice Chair of the Board of Directors of the FDIC	Travis Hill	January 5, 2023 (Confirmed December 19, 2022 by voice vote)	—
— Member of the Board of Directors of the FDIC	Martin J. Gruenberg (Reappointment)	January 5, 2023 (Confirmed December 19, 2022, 45–39)	—
— Member of the Board of Directors of the FDIC	Travis Hill	January 5, 2023 (Confirmed December 19, 2022 by voice vote)	—
— Member of the Board of Directors of the FDIC	Jonathan McKernan	January 5, 2023 (Confirmed December 19, 2022 by voice vote)	—
— Inspector General of the FDIC	Jennifer L. Fain	December 22, 2023 (Confirmed December 20, 2023 by voice vote)	—
Federal Housing Finance Agency
— Director of the Federal Housing Finance Agency	Sandra L. Thompson	June 21, 2022 (Confirmed May 25, 2022, 49–46)	—
— Inspector General of the Federal Housing Finance Agency	Brian Tomney	March 14, 2022 (Confirmed February 17, 2022 by voice vote)	—
Federal Labor Relations Authority
— Chair of the Federal Labor Relations Authority	Susan Tsui Grundmann	January 3, 2023	—
— Member of the Federal Labor Relations Authority	Susan Tsui Grundmann	May 17, 2022 (Confirmed May 12, 2022, 50–49)	—
— Member of the Federal Labor Relations Authority	Anne M. Wagner	July 30, 2024 (Confirmed July 10, 2024, 55–37)	—
— Member of the Federal Labor Relations Authority	Colleen Kiko (Reappointment)	Reappointment (Confirmed July 23, 2024, 82-6)	—
General Services Administration
— Administrator of General Services	Robin Carnahan	July 2, 2021 (Confirmed June 23, 2021 by voice vote)	—
International Development Finance Corporation
— Chief Executive Officer of the International Development Finance Corporation	Scott Nathan	February 24, 2022 (Confirmed February 9, 2022, 72–24)	—
— Deputy Chief Executive Officer of the International Development Finance Corporation	Nisha Desai Biswal	August 14, 2023 (Confirmed July 27, 2023 by voice vote)	—
Millennium Challenge Corporation
— Chief Executive Officer of the Millennium Challenge Corporation	Alice Albright	February 16, 2022 (Confirmed February 7, 2022 by voice vote)	—
National Archives and Records Administration
— Archivist of the United States	Colleen Joy Shogan	May 17, 2023 (Confirmed May 10, 2023, 52–45)	—
National Credit Union Administration
— Chair of the National Credit Union Administration	Todd Harper	January 25, 2021	—
— Member of the National Credit Union Administration	Todd Harper (Reappointment)	July 11, 2022 (Confirmed June 8, 2022, 59–40)	—
— Member of the National Credit Union Administration	Tanya Otsuka	January 8, 2024 (Confirmed December 20, 2023 by voice vote)	—
Peace Corps
— Director of the Peace Corps	Carol Spahn	January 11, 2023 (Confirmed December 13, 2022 by voice vote)	—
— Deputy Director of the Peace Corps	David E. White Jr.	December 22, 2023 (Confirmed December 20, 2023 by voice vote)	—
Social Security Administration
— Commissioner of the Social Security Administration	Martin O'Malley	December 20, 2023 (Confirmed December 18, 2023, 50–11)	November 29, 2024
United States Agency for Global Media
— Chief Executive Officer of the United States Agency for Global Media	Amanda Bennett	October 12, 2022 (Confirmed September 22, 2022, 60–36)	—
— Chair of the International Broadcasting Advisory Board	Kenneth Jarin	January 23, 2024 (Confirmed December 6, 2023 by voice vote)	—
— Member of the International Broadcasting Advisory Board	Kenneth Jarin	January 23, 2024 (Confirmed December 6, 2023 by voice vote)	—
— Member of the International Broadcasting Advisory Board	Luis Botello	January 23, 2024 (Confirmed December 6, 2023 by voice vote)	—
— Member of the International Broadcasting Advisory Board	Jeffrey Gedmin	January 23, 2024 (Confirmed December 6, 2023 by voice vote)	—
— Member of the International Broadcasting Advisory Board	Kathleen Matthews	January 23, 2024 (Confirmed December 6, 2023 by voice vote)	—
— Member of the International Broadcasting Advisory Board	Michelle Giuda	January 23, 2024 (Confirmed December 6, 2023 by voice vote)	—
— Member of the International Broadcasting Advisory Board	Jamie Fly	January 23, 2024 (Confirmed December 6, 2023 by voice vote)	—
United States Office of Government Ethics
— Director of the Office of Government Ethics	David Huitema	December 16, 2024 (Confirmed November 14, 2024, 50–46)	—
United States Office of Special Counsel
— Special Counsel of the United States	Hampton Dellinger	March 6, 2024 (Confirmed February 27, 2024, 49–47)	—

=== Board of directors of independent agencies ===
Office	Nominee	Assumed office	Left office
African Development Foundation
— Chair of the Board of Directors of the African Development Foundation	Carol Moseley Braun	April 2024	—
— Member of the Board of Directors of the African Development Foundation	Carol Moseley Braun	April 2024 (Confirmed March 8, 2024 by voice vote)	—
Amtrak (National Railroad Passenger Corporation)
— Member of the Board of Directors of Amtrak	Anthony Coscia (Reappointment)	January 23, 2024 (Confirmed January 23, 2024, 79–18)	—
— Member of the Board of Directors of Amtrak	Chris Koos	January 2024 (Confirmed January 23, 2024, 91–7)	—
— Member of the Board of Directors of Amtrak	Joel Szabat	January 2024 (Confirmed January 23, 2024, 96–1)	—
— Member of the Board of Directors of Amtrak	David Capozzi	December 2024 (Confirmed December 21, 2024 by voice vote)	—
— Member of the Board of Directors of Amtrak	Elaine Marie Clegg	December 2024 (Confirmed December 21, 2024 by voice vote)	—
— Member of the Board of Directors of Amtrak	Ronald Batory	December 2024 (Confirmed December 21, 2024 by voice vote)	—
— Member of the Board of Directors of Amtrak	Lanhee Chen	December 2024 (Confirmed December 21, 2024 by voice vote)	—
Federal Agricultural Mortgage Corporation
— Member of the Board of Directors of the Federal Agricultural Mortgage Corporation	Chet Culver	May 23, 2022 (Confirmed May 18, 2022 by voice vote)	—
Metropolitan Washington Airports Authority
— Member of the Board of Directors of the Metropolitan Washington Airports Authority	Sean Burton	October 19, 2022 (Confirmed September 29, 2022 by voice vote)	May 30, 2024
National Institute of Building Sciences
— Member of the Board of Directors of the National Institute of Building Sciences	Evelyn M. Fujimoto	October 1, 2021 (Confirmed August 11, 2021 by voice vote)	—
— Member of the Board of Directors of the National Institute of Building Sciences	Lori Peek	October 1, 2021 (Confirmed August 11, 2021 by voice vote)	—
— Member of the Board of Directors of the National Institute of Building Sciences	Kimberly L. Jones	October 1, 2021 (Confirmed August 11, 2021 by voice vote)	—
— Member of the Board of Directors of the National Institute of Building Sciences	William E. Holloway	October 1, 2021 (Confirmed August 11, 2021 by voice vote)	—
Tennessee Valley Authority
— Member of the Board of Directors of the Tennessee Valley Authority	Michelle Moore	January 4, 2023 (Confirmed December 21, 2022 by voice vote)	—
— Member of the Board of Directors of the Tennessee Valley Authority	Bobby Klein	January 4, 2023 (Confirmed December 21, 2022 by voice vote)	—
— Member of the Board of Directors of the Tennessee Valley Authority	Beth Geer	January 4, 2023 (Confirmed December 21, 2022 by voice vote)	—
— Member of the Board of Directors of the Tennessee Valley Authority	Bill Renick	January 4, 2023 (Confirmed December 21, 2022 by voice vote)	—
— Member of the Board of Directors of the Tennessee Valley Authority	Wade White	January 4, 2023 (Confirmed December 21, 2022 by voice vote)	—
— Member of the Board of Directors of the Tennessee Valley Authority	Joe Ritch	January 4, 2023 (Confirmed December 21, 2022 by voice vote)	—
— Inspector General of the Tennessee Valley Authority	Ben Wagner	June 6, 2022 (Confirmed May 26, 2022 by voice vote)	—
United States Institute of Peace
— Member of the Board of Directors of the United States Institute of Peace
— Member of the Board of Directors of the United States Institute of Peace	Edward M. Gabriel	October 24, 2022 (Confirmed August 4, 2022 by voice vote)	—
— Member of the Board of Directors of the United States Institute of Peace	Mary Swig	October 24, 2022 (Confirmed August 4, 2022 by voice vote)	—
— Member of the Board of Directors of the United States Institute of Peace	Jonathan Burks	October 24, 2022 (Confirmed August 4, 2022 by voice vote)	—
— Member of the Board of Directors of the United States Institute of Peace	Kathryn L. Wheelbarger	October 24, 2022 (Confirmed August 4, 2022 by voice vote)	—
— Member of the Board of Directors of the United States Institute of Peace	Michael Singh	October 24, 2022 (Confirmed August 4, 2022 by voice vote)	—
— Member of the Board of Directors of the United States Institute of Peace	Roger Israel Zakheim	April 2023 (Confirmed January 30, 2023, 84–10)	—
— Member of the Board of Directors of the United States Institute of Peace	Joseph L. Falk	April 2023 (Confirmed February 2, 2023, 60–37)	—
— Member of the Board of Directors of the United States Institute of Peace	John J. Sullivan	July 2024 (Confirmed May 2, 2024 by voice vote)	—
— Member of the Board of Directors of the United States Institute of Peace	Nathalie Rayes	October 24, 2022 (Confirmed August 4, 2022 by voice vote)	December 2023

=== Independent non-profit corporations ===
Office	Nominee	Assumed office	Left office
Corporation for Public Broadcasting
— Member of the Board of Directors of the Corporation for Public Broadcasting	Tom Rothman	February 23, 2022 (Confirmed February 3, 2022 by voice vote)	—
— Member of the Board of Directors of the Corporation for Public Broadcasting	Liz Sembler (Reappointment)	February 23, 2022 (Confirmed February 3, 2022 by voice vote)	—
— Member of the Board of Directors of the Corporation for Public Broadcasting	Laura G. Ross (Reappointment)	February 23, 2022 (Confirmed February 3, 2022 by voice vote)	—
— Member of the Board of Directors of the Corporation for Public Broadcasting	Kathy Im	January 5, 2023 (Confirmed December 20, 2022 by voice vote)	—
— Member of the Board of Directors of the Corporation for Public Broadcasting	Ruby Calvert (Reappointment)	January 5, 2023 (Confirmed December 20, 2022 by voice vote)	—
— Member of the Board of Directors of the Corporation for Public Broadcasting	Diane Kaplan	January 5, 2023 (Confirmed December 20, 2022 by voice vote)	—
Securities Investor Protection Corporation
— Chair of the Board of Directors of the Securities Investor Protection Corporation	Claudia Slacik	February 9, 2022	—
— Vice Chair of the Board of Directors of the Securities Investor Protection Corporation	Glen Fukushima	April 13, 2022	—
— Director of the Securities Investor Protection Corporation	Claudia Slacik	February 9, 2022 (Confirmed February 3, 2022 by voice vote)	—
— Director of the Securities Investor Protection Corporation	Claudia Slacik	Reappointment (Confirmed December 20, 2023 by voice vote)	—
— Director of the Securities Investor Protection Corporation	Glen Fukushima	April 13, 2022 (Confirmed April 6, 2022 by voice vote)	—
— Director of the Securities Investor Protection Corporation	William Brodsky	May 31, 2022 (Confirmed May 18, 2022 by voice vote)	—
— Director of the Securities Investor Protection Corporation	William Brodsky	Reappointment (Confirmed December 20, 2023 by voice vote)	—
— Director of the Securities Investor Protection Corporation	Alan Patricof	January 5, 2023 (Confirmed December 20, 2022 by voice vote)	—
United Service Organizations
— Member of the Board of Governors of the United Service Organizations	Gil Kerlikowske	September 23, 2021	—
— Member of the Board of Governors of the United Service Organizations	Ginger Miller	September 23, 2021	—
— Member of the Board of Governors of the United Service Organizations	Manny Piñeiro	September 23, 2021	—
— Member of the Board of Governors of the United Service Organizations	Rebekah Gleaves Sanderlin	September 23, 2021	—
— Member of the Board of Governors of the United Service Organizations	Francis D. Vavala	September 23, 2021	—
— Member of the Board of Governors of the United Service Organizations	Mary A. Winnefeld	September 23, 2021	—

== Withdrawn nominations ==
Office	Nominee	Announced	Withdrawn	Notes
— Deputy Secretary of the Interior	Shannon Estenoz	May 9, 2024	January 3, 2025	
— Secretary of Labor	Julie Su	February 28, 2023	January 3, 2025	
— General Counsel to the Director of National Intelligence	John Wiegmann	April 18, 2024	January 3, 2025	
— Assistant Administrator of the EPA (Land & Emergency Management/Solid Waste)	Carlton Waterhouse	June 11, 2021	January 3, 2023	
— Assistant Administrator of the EPA (Mission Support)	Amanda Howe	June 9, 2021	April 25, 2022	
— Vice Chair for Supervision of the Federal Reserve; Member of the Federal Reserve Board of Governors	Sarah Bloom Raskin	January 14, 2022	March 15, 2022	
— Member of the National Council on the Arts	Vanesa Soledad Simon	January 8, 2024	January 3, 2025	
— Member of the National Council on the Humanities	Jerry Kang	October 29, 2021	January 3, 2023	
— Member of the National Council on the Humanities	Estrellita Brodsky	October 29, 2021	January 3, 2025	
— Member of the National Council on the Humanities	Daryle Williams	September 15, 2023	January 3, 2025	
— Member of the National Council on the Humanities	Emily Edenshaw	February 8, 2024	January 3, 2025	
— Member of the National Council on the Humanities	Margaret FitzPatrick	February 8, 2024	January 3, 2025	
— Member of the National Council on the Humanities	Deborah Willis	February 8, 2024	January 3, 2025	
— Assistant Administrator of USAID (Asia)	Amy Searight	July 29, 2021	January 3, 2022	Nomination not resent
— Assistant Administrator of USAID (Development, Democracy, & Innovation)	Carla Koppell	August 25, 2021	April 7, 2022	
— Assistant Administrator of USAID (Middle East)	Tamara Wittes	July 19, 2021	January 3, 2023	
— Assistant Administrator of USAID (Middle East)	Andrew Plitt	September 21, 2023	January 3, 2025	
— Inspector General of USAID	Nicole Angarella	July 29, 2021	January 3, 2023	
— Federal Co-Chair of the Great Lakes Authority	Matthew Kaplan	May 2, 2024	January 3, 2025	
— U.S. Director of the African Development Bank	Dana L. Banks	February 29, 2024	January 3, 2025	
— U.S. Governor of the European Bank for Reconstruction and Development	Janet Yellen	July 19, 2021	January 3, 2025	
— U.S. Director of the European Bank for Reconstruction and Development	Richard Weiner	August 3, 2022	January 3, 2025	
— U.S. Governor of the IDB	Janet Yellen	July 19, 2021	January 3, 2025	
— Executive Director of the IDB	Leopoldo Martinez	August 10, 2021	January 3, 2024	
— U.S. Governor of the International Bank for Reconstruction and Development	Janet Yellen	July 19, 2021	January 3, 2025	
— U.S. Executive Director of the International Bank for Reconstruction and Development	Leonardo Martinez-Diaz	January 11, 2024	January 3, 2025	
— U.S. Governor of the IMF	Janet Yellen	July 19, 2021	January 3, 2025	
— U.S. Executive Director of the IMF	Elizabeth Shortino	February 4, 2022	January 3, 2025	
— U.S. Alternate Executive Director of the IMF	Stephanie Segal	May 23, 2024	January 3, 2025	
— Member of the CSB	Jennifer Sass	April 28, 2021	January 3, 2022	Nomination not resent
— Member of the Civil Rights Cold Case Records Review Board	Clayborne Carson	June 11, 2021	January 7, 2022	
— Member of the Defense Nuclear Facilities Safety Board	William I. White	May 23, 2024	January 3, 2025	
— Chair of the Federal Retirement Thrift Investment Board; Member of the Federal Retirement Thrift Investment Board	Javier Saade	August 4, 2021	January 3, 2023	
— Member of the NLRB	Lauren McFerran (Reappointment)	May 23, 2024	January 3, 2025	
— Member of the NLRB	Joshua Ditelberg	May 23, 2024	January 3, 2025	
— Member of the National Mediation Board	Gerald Fauth (Reappointment)	July 2, 2021	January 3, 2022	Nomination not resent
— Member of the NTSB	Thomas B. Chapman (Reappointment)	July 31, 2024	January 3, 2025	
— Member of the PCLOB	J. Tyler McGaughey	June 13, 2024	January 3, 2025	
— Chair of the Public Buildings Reform Board	Jeffrey Gural	July 6, 2022	January 3, 2025	
— Chair and Member of the Railroad Retirement Board	Debbie Halvorson Bush	July 11, 2024	January 3, 2025	
— Member of the Social Security Advisory Board	Sharon Lewis	January 19, 2022	January 3, 2025	
— Member of the Social Security Advisory Board	Andrew G. Biggs	May 13, 2022	January 3, 2025	
— Member of the Social Security Advisory Board	Kathryn Lang	January 23, 2023	January 3, 2025	
— Member of the USPS Board of Governors	Marty Walsh	February 29, 2024	November 14, 2024	
— Member of the USPS Board of Governors	Val Demings	July 25, 2024	January 3, 2025	
— Member of the USPS Board of Governors	William D. Zollars (Reappointment)	July 25, 2024	January 3, 2025	
— Member of the USPS Board of Governors	Gordon Hartogensis	September 9, 2024	January 3, 2025	
— Member of the USPS Board of Governors	Anton Hajjar (Reappointment)	December 16, 2024	January 3, 2025	
— Commissioner of the CFTC	Julie B. Siegel	July 11, 2024	January 3, 2025	
— Commissioner of the FCC	Gigi Sohn	October 26, 2021	March 7, 2023	
— Commissioner of the Federal Maritime Commission	Carl Bentzel (Reappointment)	July 11, 2024	November 14, 2024	
— Commissioner of the Federal Maritime Commission	Louis E. Sola (Reappointment)	July 11, 2024	January 3, 2025	
— Commissioner of the Federal Mine Safety and Health Review Commission	Marco M. Rajkovich Jr. (Reappointment)	July 11, 2024	January 3, 2025	
— Commissioner of the ITC	William Patrick J. Kimmitt	July 11, 2024	January 3, 2025	
— Commissioner of the ITC	Jim B. Coughlan	November 21, 2024	January 3, 2025	
— Commissioner of the ITC	Halie Craig	November 21, 2024	January 3, 2025	
— Commissioner of the Marine Mammal Commission	Lisa Ballance	July 23, 2024	January 3, 2025	
— Commissioner of the NRC	Jeff Baran (Reappointment)	April 20, 2023	January 3, 2024	Nomination not resent
— Commissioner of the OSHRC	Susan Harthill	September 22, 2021	April 25, 2022	Appointed to be chair and chief judge of the Administrative Review Board at the Department of Labor in May 2022.
— Commissioner of the OSHRC	Amanda Wood Laihow (Reappointment)	July 3, 2023	January 3, 2025	
— Commissioner of the OSHRC	Mark Eskenazi	June 5, 2024	January 3, 2025	
— Member of the SEC	Caroline A. Crenshaw (Reappointment)	June 13, 2024	January 3, 2025	
— Commissioner of the U.S. Sentencing Commission	Claria Horn Boom (Reappointment)	October 24, 2023	January 3, 2025	
— Commissioner of the U.S. Sentencing Commission	John Gleeson (Reappointment)	October 24, 2023	January 3, 2025	
— Member of the Board of Trustees of the Barry M. Goldwater Scholarship Foundation	Mildred Otero	June 25, 2021	January 3, 2023	
— Member of the Board of Trustees of the Barry M. Goldwater Scholarship Foundation	Barbara George Johnson	June 25, 2021	January 3, 2025	
— Member of the Board of Trustees of the Barry M. Goldwater Scholarship Foundation	Paul Herdman	September 5, 2023	January 3, 2025	
— Member of the Board of Trustees of the Harry S. Truman Scholarship Foundation	Robert Garcia	June 23, 2021	January 7, 2022	
— Member of the Board of Trustees of the James Madison Memorial Fellowship Foundation	James Diossa	July 14, 2021	July 11, 2022	
— Member of the Board of Trustees of the James Madison Memorial Fellowship Foundation	Christopher H. Schroeder	September 15, 2023	January 3, 2025	
— Member of the Board of Directors of AmeriCorps	Cynthia Hogan	April 20, 2021	February 10, 2022	
— Member of the Board of Directors of AmeriCorps	Alvin Warren (Reappointment)	July 11, 2023	January 3, 2025	
— Member of the Board of Directors of AmeriCorps	Leslie Bluhm (Reappointment)	July 11, 2023	January 3, 2025	
— Member of the Board of Directors of AmeriCorps	Shirley Sagawa (Reappointment)	April 11, 2024	January 3, 2025	
— Inspector General of AmeriCorps	Stephen Ravas	January 11, 2024	January 3, 2025	
— Member of the Farm Credit Administration	Marcus D. Graham	May 2, 2024	January 3, 2025	
— Chair of the Board of Directors of the FDIC; Member of the Board of Directors of the FDIC	Christy Goldsmith Romero	June 13, 2024	January 3, 2025	
— General Counsel of the Federal Labor Relations Authority	Kurt Rumsfeld	August 4, 2021	January 3, 2023	
— General Counsel of the Federal Labor Relations Authority	Suzanne Summerlin	June 2, 2023	January 3, 2025	
— Member of the Federal Labor Relations Authority	Ernest W. DuBester	June 25, 2021	January 3, 2023	
— Member of the Federal Labor Relations Authority	Nancy Anderson Speight	June 9, 2023	October 24, 2023	
— Director of the Federal Mediation and Conciliation Service	Javier Ramirez	June 24, 2021	January 3, 2024	
— Member of the Board of Directors of the International Development Finance Corporation	Deven Parekh (Reappointment)	November 30, 2023	January 3, 2025	
— Member of the Board of Directors of the International Development Finance Corporation	Irving W. Bailey II (Reappointment)	December 20, 2023	January 3, 2025	
— Member of the Board of Directors of the Millennium Challenge Corporation	Steven L. Swig	May 2, 2023	January 3, 2024	
— Member of the Board of Directors of the Millennium Challenge Corporation	Stuart A. Levey	September 5, 2023	January 3, 2025	
— Member of the Board of Directors of the Millennium Challenge Corporation	Stanley Ryan	June 13, 2024	January 3, 2025	
— Member of the Board of Directors of the Millennium Challenge Corporation	Loida Nicolas Lewis	November 14, 2024	January 3, 2025	
— Director of the Pension Benefit Guaranty Corporation	Deva Kyle	July 11, 2024	November 14, 2024	
— Member of the Board of Trustees of the Social Security Trust Funds	Tricia Neuman	January 13, 2022	January 3, 2025	
— Member of the Board of Trustees of the Social Security Trust Funds	Demetrios L. Kouzoukas	January 3, 2023	January 3, 2025	
— Representative of the United States on the Executive Board of the World Health Organization	Vivek Murthy	October 4, 2022	January 3, 2025	
— Member of the Board of Directors of the African Development Foundation	Mary Catherine Phee	April 15, 2021	January 3, 2024	
— Member of the Board of Directors of the African Development Foundation	Monde Muyangwa	January 23, 2023	January 3, 2025	
— Member of the Board of Directors of the African Development Foundation	Jack Leslie (Reappointment)	May 8, 2023	January 3, 2025	
— Member of the Board of Directors of Amtrak	Robin Wiessmann	April 29, 2022	January 3, 2024	
— Member of the Board of Directors of Amtrak	Samuel Lathem	April 29, 2022	January 3, 2025	
— Member of the Board of Directors of the Inter-American Foundation	Liliana Ayalde	January 23, 2023	January 3, 2025	
— Member of the Board of Directors of the Inter-American Foundation	Marcela Escobari	January 23, 2023	January 3, 2025	
— Member of the Board of Directors of the Inter-American Foundation	Maria Fabiana Jorge	January 23, 2023	January 3, 2025	
— Member of the Board of Directors of the Inter-American Foundation	Brian A. Nichols	January 23, 2023	January 3, 2025	
— Member of the Board of Directors of the Inter-American Foundation	Julio Guity-Guevara	January 23, 2023	January 3, 2025	
— Member of the Board of Directors of the Metropolitan Washington Airports Authority	Sam Slater	August 10, 2021	January 3, 2025	
— Member of the Board of Directors of the State Justice Institute	Bethany Shah	May 23, 2024	January 3, 2025	
— Member of the Board of Directors of the State Justice Institute	LaKresha Moultrie	June 13, 2024	January 3, 2025	
— Member of the Board of Directors of the State Justice Institute	Devin S. Anderson	November 14, 2024	January 3, 2025	
— Member of the Board of Directors of the Tennessee Valley Authority	Kimberly Lewis	April 20, 2021	February 10, 2022	
— Member of the Board of Directors of the Tennessee Valley Authority	Patrice Robinson	September 11, 2023	January 3, 2025	
— Member of the Board of Directors of the Tennessee Valley Authority	Beth Harwell (Reappointment)	November 21, 2024	January 3, 2025	
— Member of the Board of Directors of the Tennessee Valley Authority	Brian Noland (Reappointment)	November 21, 2024	January 3, 2025	
— Member of the Board of Directors of the Corporation for Public Broadcasting	Felix Sanchez	March 6, 2023	January 3, 2025	
— Member of the Board of Directors of the Corporation for Public Broadcasting	Janice Miriam Hellreich (Reappointment)	September 5, 2023	January 3, 2024	
— Member of the Board of Directors of the Corporation for Public Broadcasting	Carol Kellermann	November 14, 2024	January 3, 2025	
— Member of the Board of Directors of the Corporation for Public Broadcasting	Adam J. White	November 14, 2024	January 3, 2025	

== See also ==
- Cabinet of Joe Biden, for the vetting process undergone by top-level roles including advice and consent by the Senate
- List of ambassadors appointed by Joe Biden
- Joe Biden Supreme Court candidates
- List of United States attorneys appointed by Joe Biden
- List of federal judges appointed by Joe Biden

== Notes ==
Confirmation votes

Confirmations by roll call vote

Confirmations by voice vote
