= Ike Irby =

American political advisor

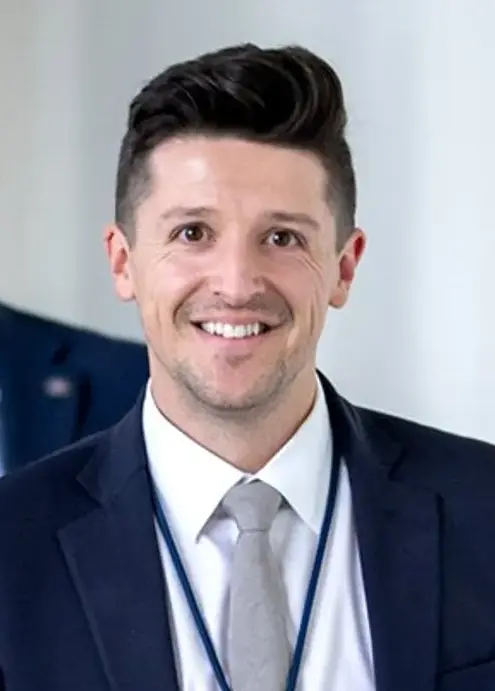
- Irby in 2023

Deputy Domestic Policy Advisor to the Vice President
- In office September 2023 – February 2024
- Vice President: Kamala D. Harris
- Succeeded by: Ben Moss

Chief Climate Advisor to the Vice President
- In office January 2023 – September 2023
- Vice President: Kamala D. Harris
- Preceded by: Position established
- Succeeded by: Becca Ellison

Senior Policy Advisor to the Vice President
- In office June 24, 2022 – January 2023
- Vice President: Kamala D. Harris

Policy Advisor to the Vice President
- In office January 20, 2021 – June 24, 2022
- Vice President: Kamala D. Harris

Personal details
- Born: Isaac David Irby; 1986 or 1987 (age 39–40) Colorado, U.S.
- Party: Democratic
- Education: Bowdoin College (BA); College of William & Mary (MPP); Virginia Institute of Marine Science (PhD)

Isaac David Irby (born 1986/1987) is an American political advisor and marine scientist who held various advisory positions in Vice President Kamala Harris's office during the Biden administration. He previously worked as a legislative policy advisor for Harris in the United States Senate and was a senior advisor in her 2024 presidential campaign.

== Early life and education ==
Irby was born and raised in Colorado. He attended Bowdoin College in Maine, graduating with a bachelor of arts in geology and earth science. Irby later pursued graduate studies at the College of William & Mary, before completing a PhD in marine science at the Virginia Institute of Marine Science in 2017.

== Career ==
Before attending the Virginia Institute of Marine Science, Irby was a physics and earth science teacher in Missouri. In 2014, he interned at the Office of Science and Technology Policy under the Obama administration. In this position, Irby developed reports to advise Obama on science and technology issues.

After completing his PhD, Irby moved from Virginia to Washington, D.C. and was a Science and Technology Policy Fellow with the American Geophysical Union and the American Association for the Advancement of Science. In this role, he advised for then-Senator Kamala Harris's office.

In 2018, Irby began working as a policy advisor for Harris, specializing in climate, environment, energy, transportation, and infrastructure. He was promoted to senior policy advisor in 2020.

=== Office of the Vice President ===
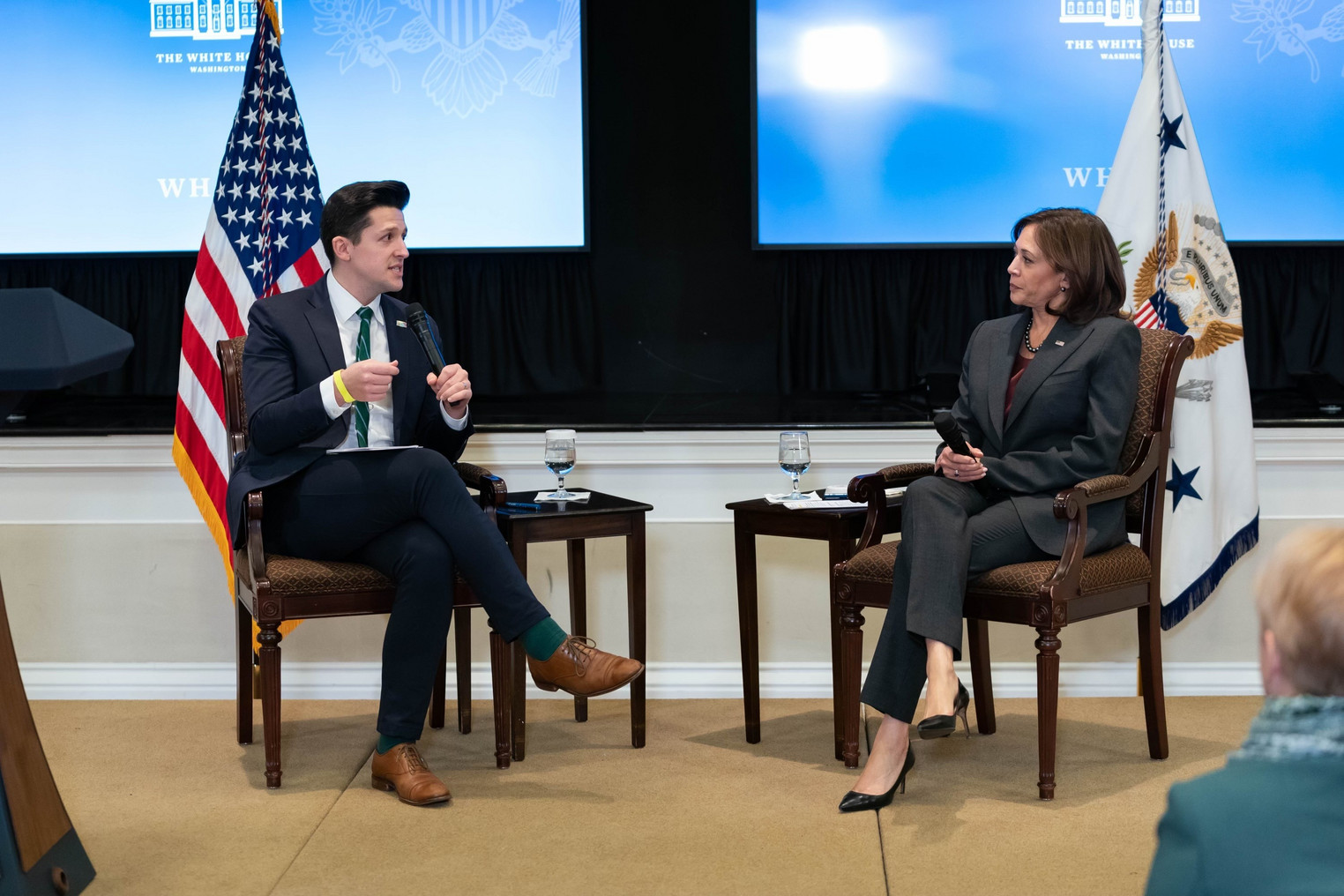
Irby with Vice President Harris

Irby was one of the first new hires announced by the incoming Biden administration, assuming the title of policy advisor to the vice president on January 20, 2021. On June 24 of the following year, Irby was promoted to senior policy advisor.

Throughout his various positions at the office of the vice president, Irby worked with White House Climate Policy Office. In 2023, after becoming chief climate advisor, he travelled with Harris to attend global climate negotiations in the United Arab Emirates. In September of the same year, he was promoted to deputy domestic policy advisor to the vice president.

He left his position as deputy domestic policy adviser in February 2024. Speaking to The Advocate after his departure was publicly announced, Harris praised Irby's "ability to tackle the most complex and significant issues of our time with optimism and resolve", and thanked him for his "service and counsel".

Irby was described by The New York Times as a part of the vice president's "inner circle", while E&E News by POLITICO called him the vice president's "go-to guy on climate".

=== Kamala Harris 2024 presidential campaign ===
Irby was announced as a senior adviser for Harris for President in July 2024. Axios theorized that Irby would serve as an advisor in a Harris presidential administration, stating that he was "influential broadly on domestic policy for Harris".

== Personal life ==
Irby identifies as gay, and married his husband in November 2021. The couple have a toy poodle, Newton.
