= Karen Hedlund =

American lawyer

Karen Jean Hedlund
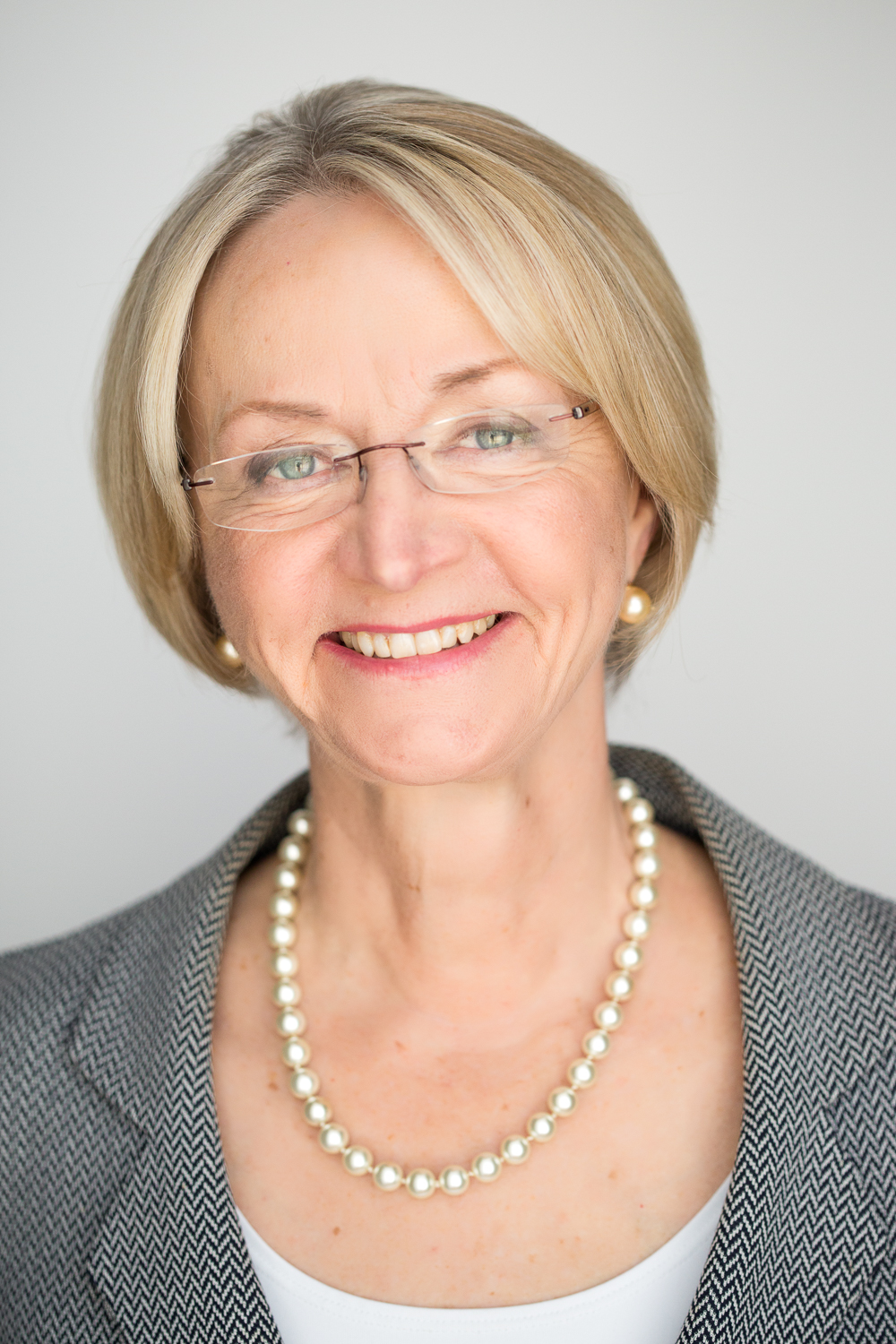
- Karen Hedlund in 2015

Member of the Surface Transportation Board
- Incumbent
- Assumed office January 3, 2022
- President: Joe Biden; Donald Trump
- Preceded by: Ann Begeman

Personal details
- Education: Harvard University (BA); Georgetown University(JD)

Karen Jean Hedlund is an American attorney and governmental advisor who has served as a member of the Surface Transportation Board since January 2022.

== Early life and education ==
Hedlund has a Bachelor of Arts from Harvard University and a Juris Doctor from the Georgetown University Law Center.

== Career ==
Hedlund has an extensive background in overseeing infrastructure projects across various fields in the United States; she was a legal advisor at different levels of government. She served as Chief Counsel in both the Federal Highway Administration and Federal Railroad Administration while also being the Deputy Administrator at the latter.

Hedlund was a partner at Nossaman LLP, specializing in public-private partnerships as they affect the government.

Currently, Hedlund is involved with the Northeast Corridor Gateway Program and a proposed rail project that connects cities in the Pacific Northwest.

=== Surface Transportation Board ===
On April 28, 2021, President Joe Biden nominated Hedlund to be a member of the Surface Transportation Board. Hearings were held before the Senate Commerce Committee on the nomination on June 24, 2021. The committee favorably her nomination to the Senate floor on August 4, 2021. A hold was placed on her nomination by Senator Mike Lee until the Surface Transportation Board approved a railway project he supported in the Uinta Basin, which Lee apparently expected Hedlund to oppose. The Board approved the project on December 15, 2021, and Hedlund was confirmed by the entire Senate on December 16, 2021, via voice vote.

Hedlund assumed office on January 3, 2022.

== Personal life ==
Hedlund currently lives in Edwards, Colorado.

== See also ==
- Political appointments by Joe Biden
