= Shirley Sagawa =

American public servant (born 1961)

Shirley Sachi Sagawa (born August 25, 1961) is an American public servant. An architect of AmeriCorps, Sagawa served in the White House of President Bill Clinton and First Lady Hillary Rodham Clinton.

In 2021, President Biden nominated Sagawa to serve as a Member of the Board of Directors of the Corporation for National and Community Service. She was confirmed by the Senate on August 5, 2022.

== Professional career ==
From 1987 to 1991, Sagawa served as Chief Council for Youth Policy for Senate Labor and Human Resources Committee Chairman Edward M. Kennedy.

In 1991, Sagawa joined the staff of the National Women's Law Center as senior counsel, focusing on Title IX, child care, and women in the military.

=== White House ===
Sagawa served as a Senate-confirmed appointee in both the George H.W. Bush and Bill Clinton administrations. George H.W. Bush nominated her to serve a two-year term from 1991 to 1993 as a founding member of the Board of Directors of Commission on National and Community Service, authorized by the National and Community Service Act of 1990.

In 1993, Sagawa served in The Clinton White House as Special Assistant to the President in the Office of the First Lady and Domestic Policy Council, advising the President and First Lady on education and children's policy. During the year, she assisted the Office of National Service by participating in the drafting and negotiation of President Clinton's national service legislation for AmeriCorps and the Corporation for National and Community Service.

In November 1993, President Clinton nominated Sagawa to serve as the first managing director of the Corporation for National and Community Service. In this position, she was responsible for overseeing all of the agency's programs, including standing up the new AmeriCorps program. The first AmeriCorps members were sworn in by President Clinton September 12, 1994. Sagawa became known as the “founding Mother of the Modern Service Movement."

=== Subsequent career ===
On January 7, 2001, Sagawa was featured in Newsweek on the magazine's "Watch Out" List. She was recognized for her tenure as Deputy Assistant to President Bill Clinton and Deputy Chief of Staff for First Lady Hillary Rodham Clinton.

In February 2009 in The Chronicle of Philanthropy, Sagawa was cited discussing the number of participants involved in AmeriCorps rather than the quality of candidates involved. Focusing on the publication of her book, Sagawa was featured in Youth Today discussing the current state of community service in 2011.

In the fall of 2011, Sagawa was also featured in Smith College's Alumnae Quarterly Magazine. In the article, Sagawa's time at Smith and explores her work in public service focusing on "how to help people find service opportunities in their communities".

=== Service Year Alliance ===
In 2016, Sagawa became the founding chief executive officer of the Service Year Alliance, chaired by Gen. Stanley McChrystal (ret.).

=== Biden administration ===
On April 20, 2021, President Biden nominated Sagawa to the Board of Directors of the Corporation for National and Community Service. She was confirmed by the Senate for a term ending October 6, 2024, on August 5, 2022.

== Publications ==
=== Books ===
- Sagawa, Shirley; Segal, Eli (January 2000). "Common Interest, Common Good: Creating Value through Business and Social Sector Partnerships". California Management Review. 42 (2): 105–122. doi:10.1177/000812560004200201.
- Sagawa, Shirley; Jospin, Deborah (2008-12-03). The Charismatic Organization: Eight Ways to Grow a Nonprofit that Builds Buzz, Delights Donors, and Energizes Employees. John Wiley & Sons. ISBN 978-0-470-44934-9.
- Sagawa, Shirley (2010-04-09). The American Way to Change: How National Service and Volunteers Are Transforming America. John Wiley and Sons. ISBN 978-0-470-61865-3.

=== Articles ===
"A Half-Million Strong: AmeriCorps Volunteers Make a Difference". Center for American Progress. 15 May 2007.

== Personal life ==
Sagawa married Gregory Baer in 1989 and is mother to three boys.
