= Greg Baer =

American public policy executive (born 1962)

- Born: February 6, 1962 (age 64); Chicago, Illinois, U.S.
- Education: University of North Carolina, Chapel Hill (BA); Harvard University (JD)
- Spouse: Shirley Sachi Sagawa
- Children: 3 (Jackson, Matthew, Thomas)

Greg Baer (born February 6, 1962) is an American public policy executive serving as president and CEO of the Bank Policy Institute (BPI). He previously served as Assistant Secretary for Financial Institutions at the U.S. Department of the Treasury during the Clinton administration and as Managing Senior Counsel for the Federal Reserve Board of Governors.

== Early life and education ==
Baer was born on February 6, 1962, in Chicago, Illinois. He holds a Bachelor of Arts degree with honors in political science and economics from the University of North Carolina at Chapel Hill, and received a J.D. cum laude from Harvard Law School in 1987. While attending Harvard Law, Baer served as managing editor of the Harvard Law Review.

== Career ==
Baer began his career as a litigation associate at Williams & Connolly. He then joined the Legal Division of the Federal Reserve Board as senior managing counsel where he was responsible for special projects on behalf of the General Counsel of the Board and the Federal Open Market Committee. He served in this role until 1996, and during that time, Baer received the Federal Reserve's Special Achievement Award.

In 1996, Baer was appointed Deputy Assistant Secretary for Financial Institutions at the U.S. Department of the Treasury. In 1999, he was nominated by President Clinton and confirmed by the United States Senate as Assistant Secretary for Financial Institutions. While at the Treasury Department, Baer coordinated Treasury policy on the Gramm-Leach-Bliley Act and led the development of Presidential initiatives on financial privacy and consumer protection. He also co-led Treasury efforts to pass digital signature legislation (the Electronic Signatures in Global and National Commerce (ESIGN) Act). Baer was appointed by Secretary Lawrence Summers to coordinate Treasury policy on cyberdefense and was the chief government architect in creation of the FS/ISAC, a computer defense center.

In 2002, Baer joined Wilmer, Cutler, & Pickering as a partner. He left the firm in 2006 to serve as deputy general counsel at Bank of America. While there, Baer played a key role in the bank's dealings with regulators and assisted in the repayment of $45 billion in U.S. TARP assistance. Baer then joined JPMorgan Chase in 2010 as managing director and general counsel for corporate law, where he oversaw legal support for the firm's corporate functions.

Baer left JPMorgan Chase in 2015 to become general counsel of the Clearing House Association Payments Company.

== Bank Policy Institute ==
In July 2018, the Clearing House Association merged with the Financial Services Roundtable, and Baer assumed the role of President and CEO of the newly formed Bank Policy Institute.

Baer has appeared before Congress on multiple occasions to provide expert testimony on a range of topics, including beneficial ownership reform and supervision and regulation of financial institutions, capital regulation, and anti-money laundering and countering the financing of terrorism laws. He is also regularly quoted by financial news outlets including CNBC, the Wall Street Journal, Bloomberg, Financial Times, American Banker, CNN, and POLITICO.

== Writing ==
Baer is the author of two books: The Great Mutual Fund Trap, co-authored with Gary Gensler, and Life: The Odds (And How to Improve Them).

== Board affiliations and teaching ==
Baer serves as an adjunct professor at Georgetown University Law Center, where he teaches courses on financial regulation, commercial and investment banking, and fintech innovation and regulation. He serves on the board of Honors Carolina and previously served on the board of Enterprise Community Partners.

== Awards and recognition ==
While in private practice, Baer was recognized by the Washingtonian as one of the "Best Lawyers in Washington" and recognized by Chambers USA as one of "America's Leading Lawyers for Business." Baer was named by the Washingtonian as one of "Washington D.C.'s 500 Most Influential People" in 2022, 2023, and 2024.

== Personal life ==
Baer is married to Shirley Sachi Sagawa, an American public servant. Together, they have three sons, Jackson, Matthew, and Thomas.
