= Enoh T. Ebong =

Nigerian-American attorney and trade official

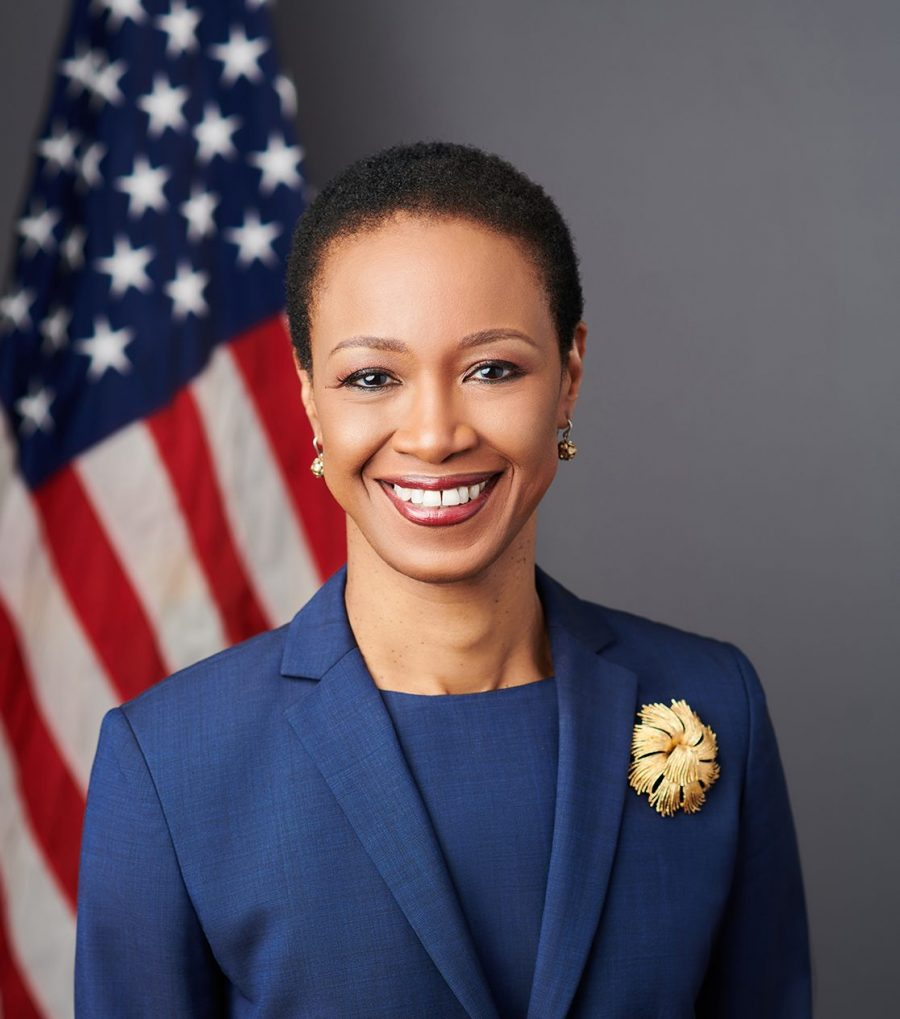
- Official portrait, 2022

Director of the United States Trade and Development Agency
- In office April 6, 2022 – January 20, 2025
- President: Joe Biden
- Succeeded by: TBC
- In office 2017
- President: Barack Obama

Personal details
- Born: Enoh Titilayo Ebong Nigeria
- Education: University of Edinburgh (MA); University of Pennsylvania (MA); University of Michigan (JD)

Enoh Titilayo Ebong is a Nigerian-American attorney and trade official who served as the director of the United States Trade and Development Agency from 2022 to 2025.

== Early life and education ==
Ebong was born in Nigeria. Ebong's father, Ime James Ebong, served as permanent secretary of the Nigeria Federal Ministry of Economic Development and Reconstruction. She earned a Master of Arts in history from the University of Edinburgh (undergraduate degree in the Scottish system), a Master of Arts degree from the Annenberg School for Communication at the University of Pennsylvania, and a Juris Doctor from the University of Michigan Law School.

== Career ==
Ebong is a member of the Massachusetts Bar Association. From 1997 to 2004, she worked as a finance and business associate at Mintz, Levin, Cohn, Ferris, Glovsky, and Popeo. She then joined the United States Trade and Development Agency, serving as attorney–advisor from 2004 to 2007, acting regional sub-director for Sub-Saharan Africa from 2007 to 2007, assistant general counsel from 2008 to 2010, deputy general counsel from 2010 to 2013, general counsel from 2013 to 2015, acting director in 2017, and deputy director and CFO from 2015 to 2019. She rejoined the USTDA as CFO and acting director at the start of the Biden administration.

=== Nomination to USTDA ===
On October 14, 2021, President Joe Biden nominated Ebong to be the director of the USTDA. Hearings were held before the Senate Foreign Relations Committee on her nomination on December 14, 2021. The committee favorably reported the nomination to the Senate floor on January 12, 2022. Ebong was confirmed by the entire United States Senate on March 31, 2022, via voice vote.

== See also ==
- Political appointments by Joe Biden
