= Karen Stout =

American professor

Karen Louise Rohrbauck Stout is an American communications and leadership professor. She is Bowman Distinguished Professor of Leadership Studies at Western Washington University in Bellingham, Washington.

Originally from Kent, Washington, Stout attended Kent-Meridian High School before receiving a BA in communication from the University of Puget Sound in 1992. She subsequently attended the University of Montana for an MA in communication and the University of Utah for a PhD in communication, which was awarded in 2002. As a scholar, her work centers on marginalization and exclusion within social groups such as workplaces. Her doctoral dissertation was on inclusion in sorority membership.

In 2014, Stout was named Bowman Distinguished Professor of Leadership Studies, succeeding Joseph Garcia, who served a five-year inaugural term. Concurrent with her role as Bowman Professor, Stout is the director of the Karen W. Morse Institute for Leadership, named after former university president Karen Morse.
