= Carlton Waterhouse =

American environmental lawyer

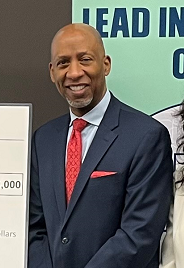
- Carlton Waterhouse, October 2022
- Education: Pennsylvania State University, Howard University School of Law, and Emory University
- Occupation: Lawyer
- Years active: 1991 - present
- Employer: Howard University
- Known for: Environmental law and environmental justice expertise
- Honours: Merit Fellow, Howard University School of Law Woodruff Scholar, Emory University Fulbright Research Scholar

Carlton Mark Waterhouse is an environmental lawyer who served as the Deputy Assistant Administrator for the Office of Land and Emergency Management (formerly the Office of Solid Waste and Emergency Response) in the United States Environmental Protection Agency. In 2021 Waterhouse was nominated for Assistant Administrator, of the Office of Land and Emergency Management in the United States Environmental Protection Agency by President Joseph Biden but left the EPA in February 2023. Waterhouse is the founder and director of the Environmental Justice Center at Howard University.

== Education ==
Waterhouse received his Bachelor of Science degree from Pennsylvania State University where he studied engineering and ethics of technology before studying law. He graduated from Howard University School of Law in 1991; during school he interned with the Lawyers' Committee for Civil Rights Under Law and the United States Environmental Protection Agency (EPA). Waterhouse graduated as a Merit Fellow. During his time with Lawyers' Committee for Civil Rights Under Law, he participated in the preliminary formation and development of the Civil Rights Act of 1992. Waterhouse later completed a Master of Theological Studies at the Candler School of Theology at Emory University. In 2006, he completed a Doctoral degree in Social Ethics at Emory, where he was a George W. Woodruff Fellow.

== Career ==
Upon completion of law school, Waterhouse served as an attorney with the EPA, in the Office of Regional Counsel in Atlanta, GA and the Office of General Counsel in Washington, D.C, where he worked on pollution enforcement cases. Waterhouse teaches courses on property law and environmental and administrative law and related courses at Howard University School of Law. During his time there, he built and was the director of the Environmental Justice Center. The center conducts research on climate and environmental justice, supports local communities confronting environmental injustices and provides policy work to promote environmental and climate justice at the local, national, and global levels. Waterhouse has conducted research and written about lead poisoning in children of color, and reparations for descendants of enslaved people.

Waterhouse testified before the Inter-American Commission on Human Rights of the Organization of American States on the importance of reparations for African Americans. He was a Fulbright Research Scholar in Brazil working on a Social Dominance and Criminal Justice project. In 2021, President Biden appointed Waterhouse as Deputy Assistant Administrator for the Office of Land and Emergency Management at EPA. In 2023, Waterhouse left the EPA citing caring for his parents declining health for why he could no longer serve.

=== Office of Land and Emergency Management nomination ===
In late 2021, Waterhouse nominated to lead the EPA's Office of Land and Emergency Management. The office works to prevent contamination and clean up and return land to productive use and responding to emergencies, including managing the Superfund cleanup program. Waterhouse was not confirmed after failure to be advanced from the Senate Committee on Environment and Public Works in December 2021 and April 2022, his nomination was later withdrawn in early 2023. Waterhouse left the agency in February 2023 to return to Howard University as a professor.

== Publications ==
- "The Lingering Life of Lead Pollution: An Environmental Justice Challenge for Indiana" 49 Indiana Law Review 99. 2015. Written with Ravay Smith.
- "Environmental Justice: A Deadly Symptom of Larger Problems a Response to the Plenary of Dr. Beverly Wright.", Journal of Healthcare, Science And The Humanities Vol. 3, No. 1 (2013)
- "Total Recall: Restoring the Public Memory of Enslaved African-Americans and the American System of Slavery Through Rectificatory Justice and Reparations", Journal of Gender, Race, and Justice, Vol 14 p. 703 (2011).
- "No Reparations Without Taxation: Applying the Internal Revenue Code to the Concept of Reparations for Slavery and Segregation", Florida International University Legal Studies Research Paper No. 08-28 (2010)
- "The Good, the Bad, and the Ugly: Moral Agency and the Role of Victims in Reparations Programs". University of Pennsylvania Journal of International Law. Vol. 31 (2009–2010) Iss. 1.
- "Follow the Yellow Brick Road: Perusing the Path to Constitutionally Permissible Reparations for Slavery and Jim Crow Era Governmental Discrimination". Rutgers Law Review, Vol. 62, No. 1, p. 163 (2009).
