= Adele Merritt =

American applied mathematician and information and technology executive

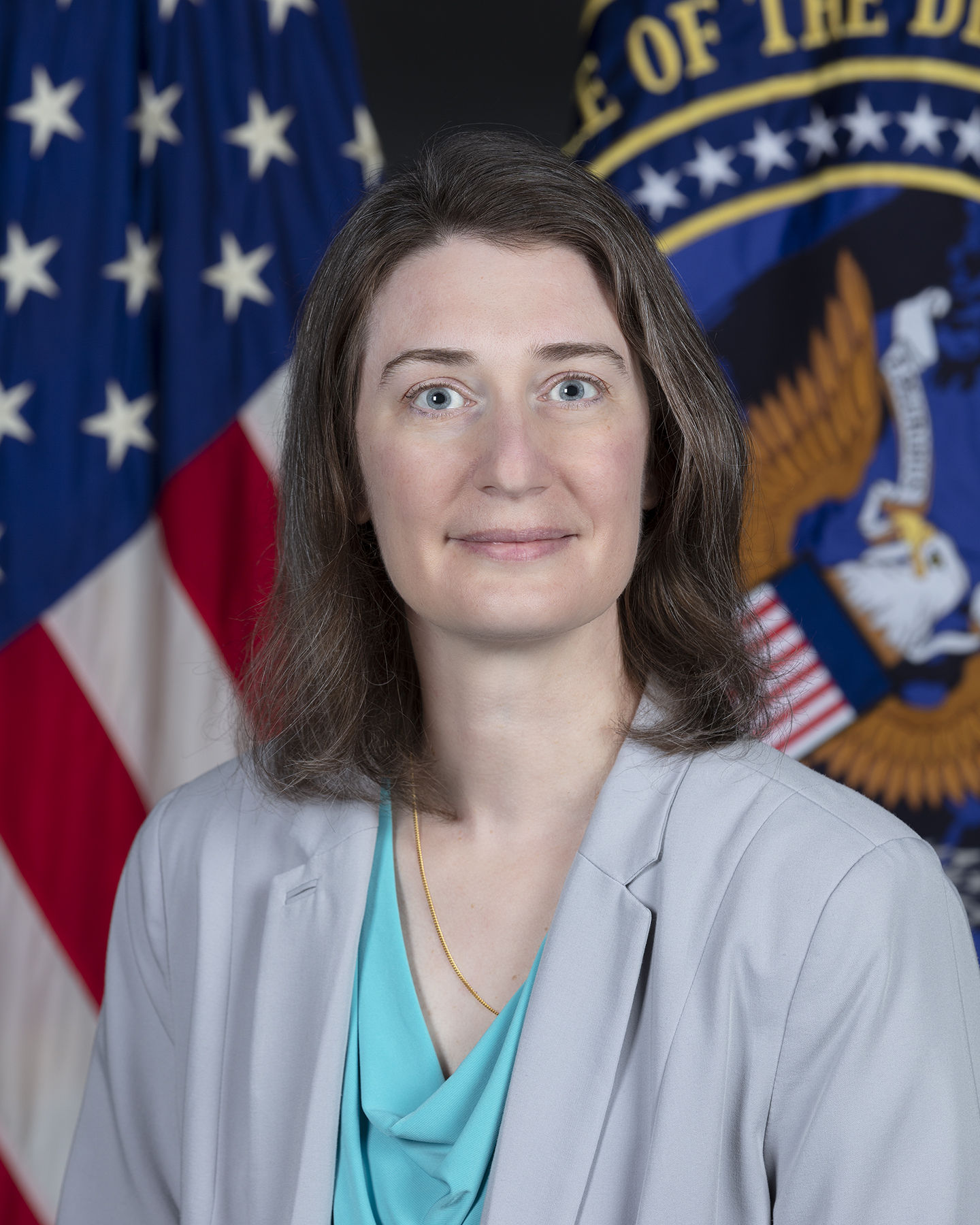

Associate Director of National Intelligence and Chief Information Officer
- In office January 24, 2022 – December 16, 2024
- President: Joe Biden
- Preceded by: Michael Waschull (acting)
- Succeeded by: Doug Cossa (acting)

Personal details
- Children: 2
- Education: Pace University; University of Rhode Island

Adele Johanna Josiger Merritt is an American applied mathematician and intelligence official who served as the U.S. associate director of national intelligence and chief information officer.

== Life ==
Merritt earned a Bachelor of Science and a Bachelor of Business Administration in Finance from Pace University. She completed a Master of Science and Ph.D. in mathematics from the University of Rhode Island. Her 1999 dissertation was titled Advances in Z-cyclic whist and triple whist tournaments. Norman Joseph Finizio was her doctoral advisor. Merritt was a national security fellow at the Harvard Kennedy School.

Merritt began her career at the National Security Agency as an applied research mathematician. In addition to holding various positions within the U.S. Intelligence Community (IC), she completed a joint duty assignment at the Federal Bureau of Investigation, was the principal deputy chief information officer for cyber at the U.S. Department of Energy, and served as a director and acting senior director for intelligence programs on the National Security Council staff during the Obama administration. Merritt led a public-private partnership focused on addressing cyber threats to U.S. national security systems and critical infrastructure. Most recently, she was the program director at MISI, a non-profit focused on advancing cybersecurity innovation and collaboration through partnerships with industry, academia, and government. In 2022, Merritt was nominated by U.S. president Joe Biden to serve as the associate director of national intelligence and chief information officer. She started in this role on January 24, 2022. She resigned in December 2024 after being named CIO of the National Institutes of Health.

Merritt and her husband are the parents of twins.
