= Federal Mine Safety and Health Review Commission =

U.S. government agency

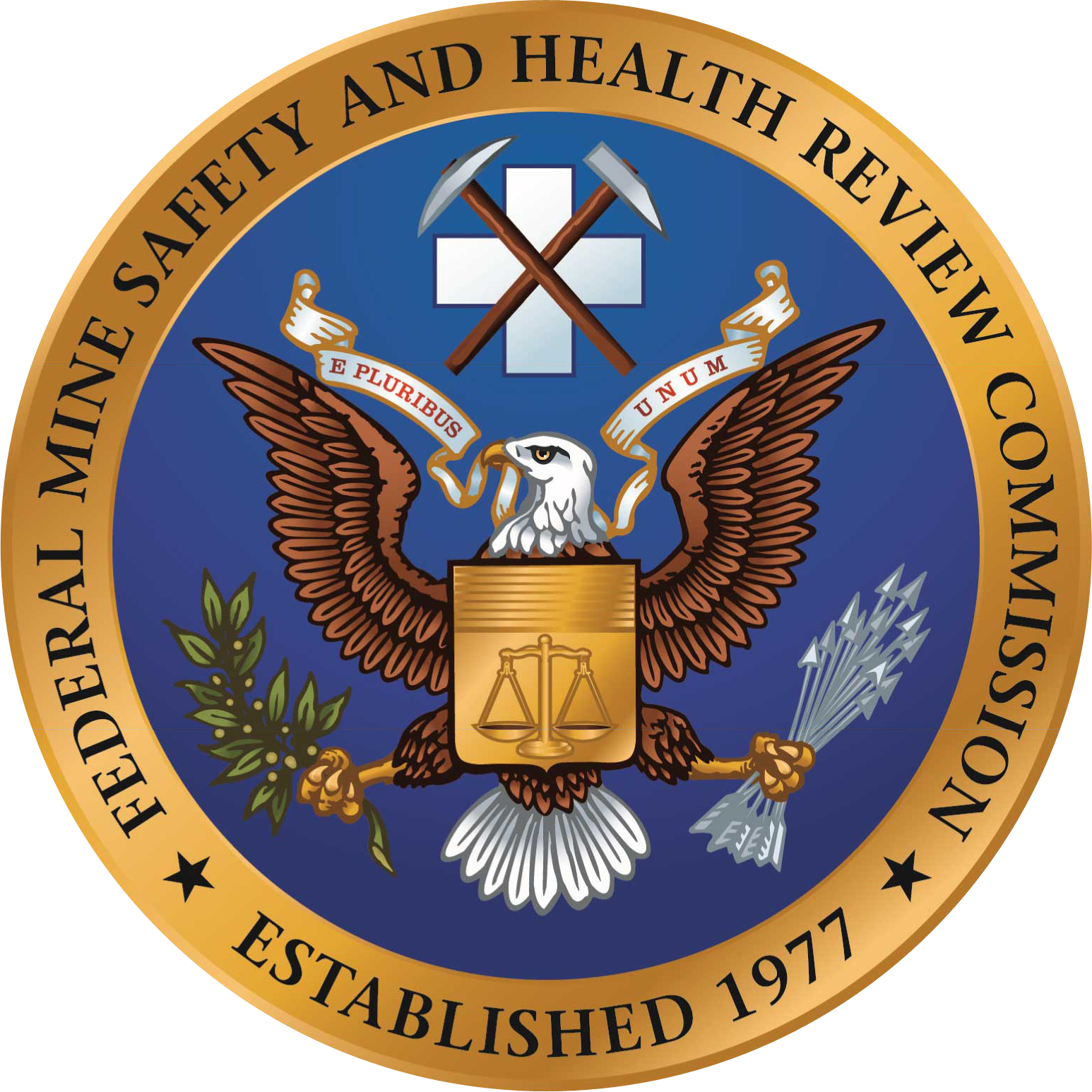
- Seal of the Federal Mine Safety and Health Review Commission

Agency overview
- Formed: November 10, 1977; 48 years ago
- Preceding agency: Interior Board of Mine Operations Appeals
- Headquarters: Washington, D.C.
- Employees: <20
- Annual budget: $18 million (2026)
- Agency executive: Marco M. Rajkovich, Jr., Chairman
- Website: www.fmshrc.gov

The Federal Mine Safety and Health Review Commission (FMSHRC) is an independent adjudicative agency of the United States government that provides administrative trial and appellate review of legal disputes arising under the Federal Mine Safety and Health Amendments Act, or Mine Act, of 1977.

== Overview ==
Under the Mine Act, the U.S. Department of Labor issues regulations covering health and safety in the nation's mines. Federal mine inspectors employed by the Department's Mine Safety and Health Administration (MSHA) enforce these regulations by issuing citations and orders to mine operators. The commission is concerned solely with the adjudication of disputes under the Mine Act, including the determination of appropriate penalties. It does not regulate mining or enforce the Mine Act. The commission was established as an independent agency to ensure its impartiality.

Most cases deal with civil penalties assessed against mine operators and address whether the alleged safety and health violations occurred as well as the appropriateness of proposed penalties. Other types of cases include orders to close a mine, miners' charges of safety related discrimination and miners’ requests for compensation after the mine is idled by a closure order.

The commission's administrative law judges (ALJs) decide cases at the trial level. The five-member Commission provides appellate review. Commissioners are appointed by the President and confirmed by the Senate. Review of an ALJ decision by the commission is not guaranteed but requires the affirmative vote of two Commissioners. Most of the cases accepted for review are generated from petitions filed by parties adversely affected by an ALJ decision. However, cases can also be accepted based on the commission's own direction for review. An ALJ decision that is not accepted for review becomes a final, non-precedential order of the commission. Appeals from the commission's decisions are to the U.S. courts of appeals.

Procedures for appealing cases to the commission are contained in its Rules of Procedure published in 29 CFR Part 2700. The commission also publishes these rules in a separate pamphlet. A brochure, entitled "How a Case Proceeds Before the Commission" is also available. The commission's headquarters and Office of Chief Administrative Law Judge are co-located in Washington, D.C., with an additional OALJ office in Denver, Colorado. Currently, the commission has a budget of more than US$18 million and a staff of less than 20 employees.

== Commissioners ==
The commission is composed of five members, appointed by the president of the United States with the consent of the United States Senate. All members shall be appointed on the basis of their training, education, or experience. Members are appointed to terms of six years. They cannot continue to serve on the commission past expiration of their term. Any member of the commission may be removed by the President for inefficiency, neglect of duty, or malfeasance in office.

The President designates one member to serve as Chairman of the commission. Three members of the commission constitutes a quorum.

=== Current commissioners ===
The current commissioners of the FMSHRC as of September 1, 2026:

Position	Name	Assumed office	Term expiration
Chairman	Marco M. Rajkovich, Jr.	October 24, 2025	August 30, 2030
Member	Vacant	—	August 30, 2032
Member	Vacant	—	August 30, 2032
Member	Vacant	—	August 30, 2028
Member	Vacant	—	August 30, 2030

== See also ==
- Title 29 of the Code of Federal Regulations
