= Elizabeth Shortino =

American economist

United States Managing Director of the International Monetary Fund
- Nominee
- Assumed office TBA
- President: Joe Biden

Personal details
- Children: 3
- Education: University of North Carolina at Chapel Hill (BA); Johns Hopkins University (MS)

Elizabeth Shortino is an American economist who is the nominee to serve as United States executive director of the International Monetary Fund.

== Education ==
Shortino earned a Bachelor of Arts degree in political science and business administration from the University of North Carolina at Chapel Hill and a Master of Science in international affairs from the Paul H. Nitze School of Advanced International Studies, where she specialized in quantitative methods and economic theory.

== Career ==
Shortino began her career as a management consultant for Capgemini and Ernst & Young. For 17 years, she has served in the Office of Management and Budget, United States Department of the Treasury, and Office of the U.S. Executive Director at the International Monetary Fund.
