= Justin Garrett Moore =

American urban designer and planner

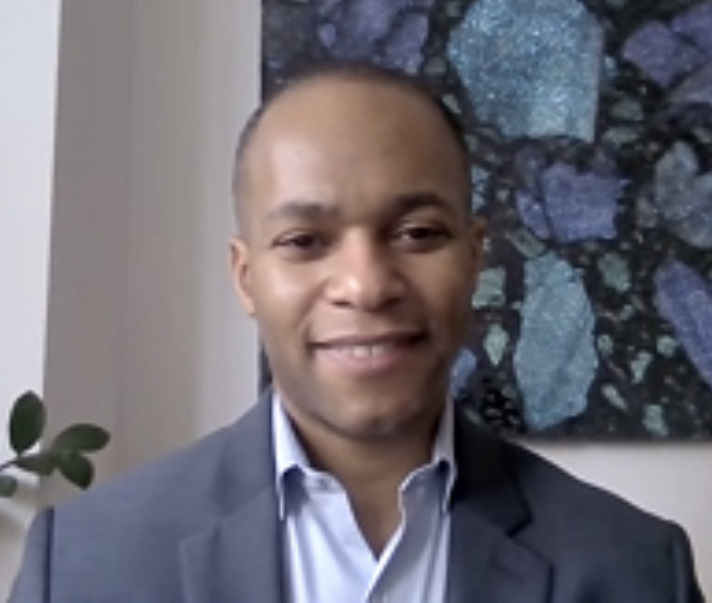
- Moore in 2021, as a member of the U.S. Commission of Fine Arts
- Education: University of Florida (BDes); Columbia University (MArch, MS)
- Occupations: Urban designer, planner, educator
- Employer: Mellon Foundation
- Known for: Executive Director of the New York City Public Design Commission (2016–2020); member of the United States Commission of Fine Arts (2021–2025)
- Awards: American Academy of Arts and Letters Award in Architecture (2021); Jacqueline Kennedy Onassis Medal (2021)

Justin Garrett Moore is an American urban designer, planner, and educator. He is the program director of the Humanities in Place program at the Mellon Foundation, a role he has held since 2020, when he was named its inaugural program officer. From 2016 to 2020 he was executive director of the New York City Public Design Commission, and from 2021 to 2025 he served as a member of the United States Commission of Fine Arts following his appointment by President Joe Biden.

Moore's work concerns public space, housing and community development, historic preservation, and public art and monuments. In 2021 he received the Award in Architecture of the American Academy of Arts and Letters, the Jacqueline Kennedy Onassis Medal, the highest honor of the Municipal Art Society of New York, and the AIA New York Champion of Architecture Award. He was elected to the College of Fellows of the American Institute of Certified Planners (FAICP) in 2024.

== Early life and education ==
Moore grew up in a predominantly Black neighborhood in Indianapolis, Indiana. He has said that projects he undertook with family and neighbors to reimagine conditions in the neighborhood prompted his interest in architecture.

He earned a Bachelor of Design in architecture from the University of Florida in 2001, and a dual Master of Architecture and Master of Science in architecture and urban design from the Columbia University Graduate School of Architecture, Planning and Preservation (GSAPP) in 2004.

== Career ==
=== New York City Department of City Planning ===
Moore joined the New York City Department of City Planning as an urban designer in 2005. He became a senior urban designer in 2009. Over more than a decade at the department he conducted urban design plans and studies covering infrastructure, public space, land use patterns and neighborhood character. Projects he led or contributed to include the Greenpoint–Williamsburg waterfront rezoning, Hunter's Point South in Queens, and the Brooklyn Cultural District. He received the department's Michael Weil Urban Design Award in 2008.

In 2014 he was named to the Vanguard class of Next City, an annual cohort of forty urban leaders under forty.

=== New York City Public Design Commission ===
On April 13, 2016, Mayor Bill de Blasio announced Moore's appointment as executive director of the New York City Public Design Commission, the city's design review agency, effective April 18. The commission reviews the design of public buildings, parks and playgrounds, and public artwork, and acts as custodian of the city's public art collection.

In 2018, under Moore's direction, the commission published Designing New York: Quality Affordable Housing, a design guide developed with the American Institute of Architects New York and the Center for Architecture that established review standards for city-financed affordable housing, an area newly brought under the commission's jurisdiction as part of Mayor de Blasio's plan to build 300,000 affordable units by 2026. The guide analyzed seven completed affordable housing developments across eight design categories, from site planning to material selection.

During his tenure Moore led initiatives addressing social equity, inclusion and sustainability in the design of the public realm and in the commission's public review processes, and the commission, under his leadership, supported the installation of Black Lives Matter street murals in New York City in the summer of 2020, including one in Foley Square painted by the artists Tijay Mohammed, Sophia Dawson, and Patrice Payne.

He left the commission in December 2020.

=== Mellon Foundation ===
In December 2020 the Mellon Foundation named Moore the inaugural program officer for Humanities in Place, a new program area concerned with how histories are represented in public, media, museum and memorial spaces. In the role he also works with the foundation's president, Elizabeth Alexander, on the Monuments Project, a five-year, $250 million project building monuments and memorials to recognize often overlooked Americans. The foundation later doubled the Monuments Project commitment to $500 million. Moore became program director of Humanities in Place in 2023.

=== United States Commission of Fine Arts ===
On May 25, 2021, the White House announced President Joe Biden's intent to appoint Moore, alongside architect Billie Tsien, Howard University architecture chair Hazel Ruth Edwards, and architect Peter Cook, to the United States Commission of Fine Arts, the federal body that advises on the design of buildings, memorials and coinage in Washington, D.C. The appointments, which are not subject to Senate confirmation, replaced appointees of the preceding administration. The appointments took effect on June 9, 2021, for four-year terms. Moore served on the commission until 2025.

=== Urban Patch ===
Moore is a co-founder of Urban Patch, a family-run social enterprise based in Indianapolis that undertakes design and development projects in the United States and Rwanda. Its work includes affordable housing preservation, urban green space, public art and educational programming. The organization traces its origins to Flanner House, a social services institution in Indianapolis associated with Moore's grandfather, Albert Allen Moore, in the 1940s.

=== Teaching ===
Moore has been an adjunct faculty member at Columbia GSAPP and an adjunct associate professor of architecture. He has also taught at the Yale School of Architecture, Morgan State University and Tuskegee University, and has been a member of the Dark Matter University network. He delivered the Eero Saarinen Lecture at Yale in 2018 and a Bartlett International Lecture at the Bartlett School of Architecture in London in 2022.

== Writing ==
Moore contributed the essay "Reconstructing Difference: Design for All of the Above" to Reconstructions: Architecture and Blackness in America, the field guide accompanying the 2021 Museum of Modern Art exhibition of the same name, edited by Sean Anderson and Mabel O. Wilson. He has written for Architect, Metropolis. He has also written for the Forum Journal of the National Trust for Historic Preservation.

He has argued that cities should establish a municipal "Department of Care," on the grounds that public infrastructure — particularly public housing — is systematically underfunded for maintenance under the framing of "deferred maintenance."

== Other affiliations ==
Moore is a founding member of BlackSpace, a Black urbanist collective, and has been a member of the American Planning Association, the National Organization of Minority Architects and the Urban Design Forum. He served on the AICP Commission of the American Planning Association from 2018 to 2021. He has served on the boards of ioby, the Youth Design Center and Friends of the High Line, and on advisory boards for Columbia World Projects, the Van Alen Institute, the Museum of Modern Art and Dumbarton Oaks.

== Awards and honors ==
- 2008 – Michael Weil Urban Design Award, New York City Department of City Planning
- 2014 – Vanguard, Next City
- 2016 – 40 Under 40, Impact Design Hub
- 2021 – Award in Architecture, American Academy of Arts and Letters
- 2021 – Jacqueline Kennedy Onassis Medal, Municipal Art Society of New York
- 2021 – Champion of Architecture Award, AIA New York
- 2024 – Fellow, College of Fellows of the American Institute of Certified Planners (FAICP)
- 2025 – The Curious 100, Eames Institute of Infinite Curiosity
