= Marcela Escobari =

American government official and diplomat (born 1973)

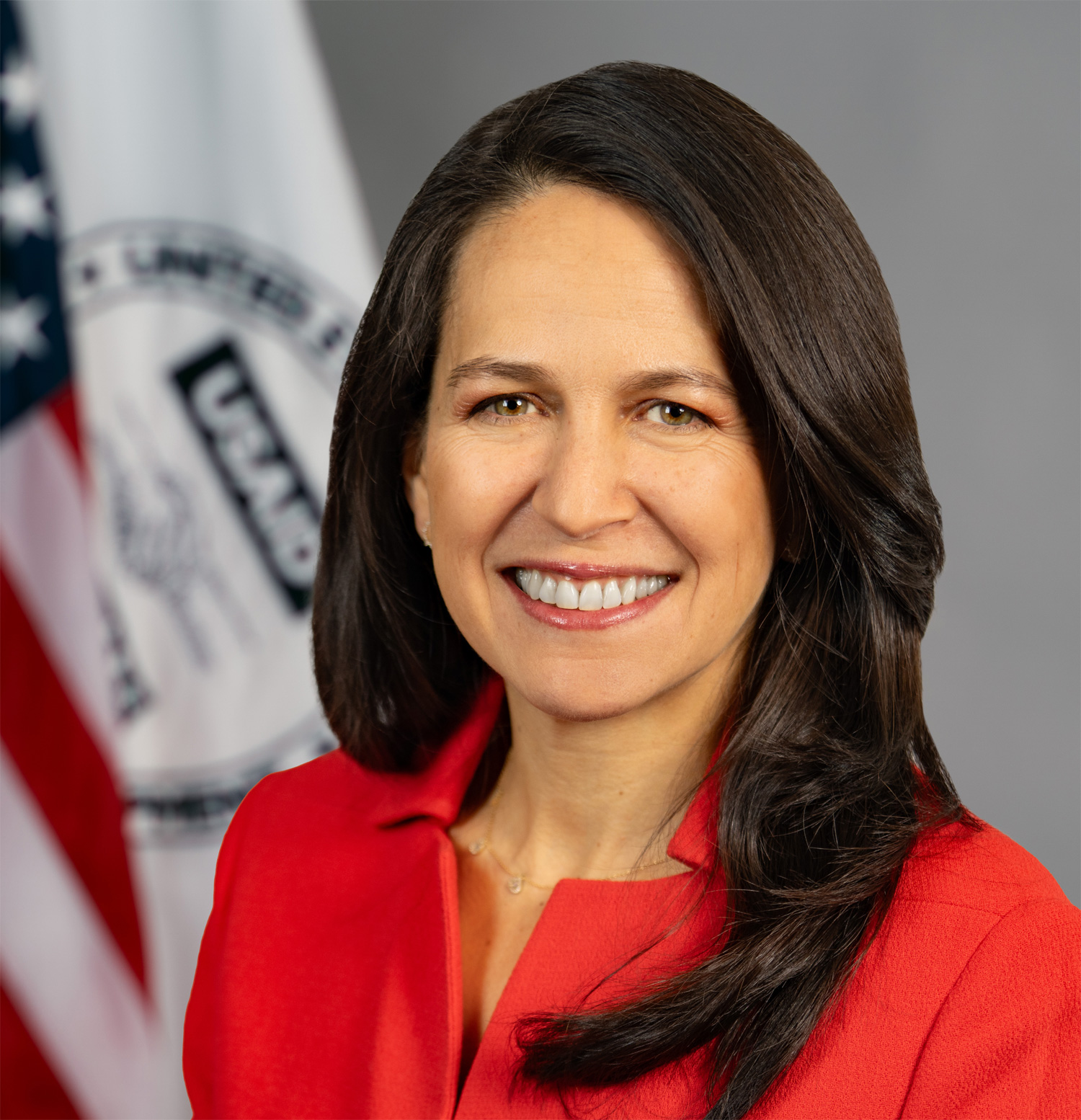

Assistant Administrator of the United States Agency for International Development for Latin America and the Caribbean
- In office January 13, 2022 – April 10, 2024
- President: Joe Biden
- Preceded by: John Barsa
- In office May 17, 2016 – January 20, 2017
- President: Barack Obama
- Preceded by: Mark Feierstein
- Succeeded by: John Barsa

Personal details
- Born: November 16, 1973 (age 52) Santa Cruz, Bolivia
- Party: Democratic
- Education: Swarthmore College (BA); Harvard University (MPP)

Marcela X. Escobari (born November 16, 1973) is a Bolivian-American government official and diplomat who served as an immigration advisor in the National Security Council. Prior to her NSC position she served as the Assistant Administrator of the Latin American and Caribbean Bureau at the United States Agency for International Development (USAID) from January 2022 to April 2024. She previously worked as a Senior Fellow in the Center for Sustainable Development at the Brookings Institution in Washington, D.C., where she led the Workforce of the Future initiative.

She served as the Assistant Administrator of the U.S. Agency for International Development's (USAID) Bureau for Latin America and the Caribbean from May 2016 to January 2017 after being nominated by President Barack Obama on December 7, 2015, and confirmed by the U.S. Senate on May 17, 2016. Previously, she was the executive director of the Center for International Development at Harvard University. Before that, she led the Americas region and served on the executive committee of the OTF Group (formerly Monitor Group) and worked as a financial analyst at J.P. Morgan Chase & Company.

On April 12, 2021, President Joseph Biden announced his intent to nominate Escobari to serve in her former role at USAID. On July 28, 2021, the U.S. Senate Committee on Foreign Relations held a hearing regarding her nomination. On December 18, 2021, her nomination was confirmed in the Senate.

== Early life and education ==
Escobari was born in Santa Cruz, Bolivia. She attended Santa Cruz Cooperative School (SCCS) high school. In 1992 she came to the United States to pursue a bachelor's degree. She received her bachelor's degree in Economics from Swarthmore College in 1996. She graduated in 2001 from Harvard Kennedy School of Government with an M.A. in Public Policy. Her master's thesis, "Assessing Network Applications for Economic Development " won best Policy Analysis Exercise (PAE) in her graduating class.

== Career ==
After completing her undergraduate education, Escobari worked for two years as a financial analyst in mergers and acquisitions at J.P. Morgan in New York City. She worked as a visiting scholar at the London Business School, writing two strategy cases on Brazilian companies (Natura was used at the MBA program). After receiving her graduate degree from Harvard, she joined OTF Group, an international management consulting firm that was a spinoff of Monitor Group (now Monitor Deloitte), where she advised governments on how to increase export competitiveness and harness the private sector to eradicate poverty.

From 2007 to 2016, Escobari served as the executive director of Harvard University's Center for International Development (CID), a research center working to generate breakthrough ideas that bring stable, shared, and sustainable prosperity to regions around the world. During her tenure, the Center tripled in size, with projects in 17 countries across 5 continents focused on unlocking constraints to economic growth. Under her leadership, the Center published the Atlas for Economic Complexity, a data visualization tool that allows people to explore global trade flows across markets, track these dynamics over time and discover new growth opportunities for every country.

Escobari left CID in 2016 when she was confirmed as the first woman to serve as USAID's Assistant Administrator for Latin America and the Caribbean. In that role, she worked to reinforce U.S. support for the peace accord in Colombia, focused on the post-hurricane response in Haiti, and pushed for a more proactive strategy to confront the humanitarian and political crisis in Venezuela. In response to Congress' doubling of funding to Central America, she launched a task force to ramp up talent and capacity at the regional hubs to disburse funds more strategically to combat the root causes of poverty and migration in the region.

From 2011 to May 2016, Escobari also served on the board of Root Capital, a nonprofit focused on financing rural development globally.

In 2017, Escobari left USAID and became a senior advisor at Mastercard's Center for InclusiveGrowth, where she advised on data philanthropy and research initiatives.

In 2018, she became a visiting fellow and, later, a senior fellow, at the Brookings Institution, where she created the Workforce of the Future initiative. Her research at Brookings uses data and network analysis to chart cities' paths toward economic growth; examine the dynamics of economic mobility in the U.S. labor market; and offer policy solutions to align economic and workforce development efforts at the city level, including responses to economic shocks caused by the COVID-19 pandemic. She has also written on the role of the private sector in driving job quality in a sustainable manner. Escobari's Brookings publications and research insights have been cited in publications such as the New York Times, BBC, Bloomberg, CNBC, Washington Post, and Forbes Advisor.

In 2020, Escobari co-led the Development, Global Health and Refugee policy working group for President Joseph Biden's presidential campaign.

After two years serving as Assistant Administrator of the United States Agency for International Development for Latin America and the Caribbean, Escobari resigned to join the National Security Council as an immigration advisor.

== Selected publications ==
Books and Reports

- Moving Up: Promoting workers' upward mobility using network analysis, Washington D.C.: Brookings Institution, Co-authored with I. Seyal and C. Daboin. (June 2021)
- Realism about Reskilling: Upgrading the career prospects of America's low-wage workers, Washington D.C.; Brookings Institution, Co-authored with I. Seyal, J. Morales, C. Shearer (December 2019)
- Growing Cities that Work for All: A capability-based approach to regional economic competitiveness. Washington D.C.; Brookings Institution, Co-authored with I. Seyal, M. Meaney (May 2019)
- In the River they Swim: Essays from around the World on Enterprise Solutions to Poverty. Philadelphia; Templeton Press, Editor and author M. Escobari, Fairbanks, Fal & Hooper, (2009)
  - Author of "Chapter 13: Selling Culture without Selling Out, on the Jamaican music industry," Kingston, Jamaica, pp. 103–133, and "Chapter 22: Praying to the Virgin of Guadalupe, on competitiveness lessons for Mexico," Mexico City, pp. 188– 195.

Blogs, Op-Eds, Podcasts, and Journal Articles

- "Metrics for job quality, mobility, and equity," Brookings Institution Podcast with John McArthur, Zia Khan, and Ethan Rouen. December 7, 2021.
- "6 job quality metrics every company should know", Brookings Institution, Oct 2021.
- "Why it's harder for American workers to get ahead, and what we can do about it", Brookings Institution Podcast, August 2021
- "The American Dream in crisis: Helping low-wage workers move up to better jobs", Brookings Institution Up Front blog, with E. Krebs, June 2021.
- "How federal infrastructure investment can put America to work", Brookings Institution, with D. Gandhi and S. Strauss, March 2021.
- "New but narrow job pathways for America's unemployed and low-wage workers", Brookings Institution Up Front blog, with I. Seyal and C. Daboin, Nov 2020
- "Dislocation of labor markets: What policies to mitigate the shock", published with VoxEU and Brookings, co-authored with Eduardo Levy Yeyati, November 2020
- "How the next recovery can revive upward mobility", Harvard Business School Managing the Future of Work, Podcast, June 2020
- "Reopening America & the World", Brookings publication, Ch. 7, "Three ways to preserve jobs", June 2020
- "Our employment system has failed low-wage workers, How can we rebuild?", Brookings Institution, with M. Hund-Mejean, April 2020
- "The Economy is growing and leaving low-wage workers behind", Brookings Institution, December 2019
- "Measuring the American Gig Workers is Difficult, but Essential", Brookings Institution Up Front blog, co-authored with Sandy Fernandez, July 2018
- "America needs a new game plan for Venezuela", The National Interest, co-authored with Michael O'Hanlon, March 21, 2019
- "How Foreign Aid helps Grand Rapids, Michigan", Bloomberg View, July 2017
- "Ukraine's real problem, in four graphs," Boston Globe, Ideas section, 2014
- "A review of evidence on mobile use by micro and small enterprises in developing countries", Journal of International Development, Escobari, M. & Donner, J. (2010), 22, 641–658. doi: 10.1002/jid.1717
- "For poor people a mobile can also mean a bank", Parliamentary Brief, The Independent Commentary on Political Affairs, October 2008
- "Building Competitive Advantage", From Growth to Prosperity, Policy Perspective for Trinidad and Tobago, IADB Special Publications on Development, M. Escobari, Fairbanks, Rabkin, Rodriguez, 2006, p. 187-258
- "Improving Competitiveness and Increasing Economic Diversification in the Caribbean: The Role of Information and Communication Technology (ICT)", M. Escobari, C. Rodriguez, D. Rabkin, InfoDev, 2005
- "Un Gigante Dormido: Cinco Opciones para La Competitividad en Mexico", PODER Magazine, Mexico edition, May 2005
- "Assessing Network Applications for Economic Development", co-author. Published at the Kennedy School of Government, supported by the CID at Harvard and the Media Lab at MIT, received Best PAE Award, 2001
- "Governance for the XXI Century; The transition to E-government" in Semana magazine, Web Edition, 2000.
- "NATURA: The Magic Behind Brazil's Most Admired Company", Case Study, London Business School Press, 1999.

Published Congressional Testimony

- Testimony of Marcela X. Escobari, Nominee for Assistant Administrator for the Bureau for Latin America and the Caribbean, United States Agency for International Development, Before the Senate Foreign Relations Committee, July 28, 2021.
- Statement of Marcela Escobari, Senior Fellow, Brookings Institution, U.S. House of Representatives Committee on Foreign Affairs, Subcommittee on the Western Hemisphere, Civilian Security, and Trade. Hearing on: 'Made by Maduro: The Humanitarian Crisis in Venezuela and U.S. Policy Responses', February 26, 2019.
- Testimony of Marcela X. Escobari, Assistant Administrator for Latin America and the Caribbean Before the House Foreign Affairs Committee, September 16, 2016.
- Statement by Marcela X. Escobari, Nominee for Assistant Administrator for the Bureau for Latin America and the Caribbean, United States Agency for International Development, Before the Senate Foreign Relations Committee, February 11, 2016

Online Data Visualization Tools

- Job Mobility and Smart Growth Toolkit, Brookings Institution.
- Visualizing Vulnerable Jobs Across America, Brookings Institution.
- The Atlas of Economic Complexity, Harvard University Center for International Development.

== Awards and recognitions ==
- Named Young Global Leader by the World Economic Forum (2013)
- Member of the Award Jury for the St. Gallen Symposium Global Essay Competition (2016–18)
- Member of the World Economic Forum Global Future Council on the Future of Production (2017)
