= Defense Nuclear Facilities Safety Board =

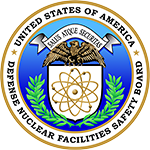
Seal of the Defense Nuclear Facilities Safety Board

The Defense Nuclear Facilities Safety Board is an independent agency of the United States government based in Washington, D.C. Established in 1988, the DNFSB oversees the nuclear weapons complex administered by the U.S. Department of Energy. The DNFSB is independent of the Department of Energy. The DNFSB's most important power is its ability to give recommendations to the Secretary of Energy.

== Membership ==
The board consists of five members, who are appointed by the President, by and with the advice and consent of the Senate. The President appoints members of the Board from civilian life who are U.S. citizens and are respected experts in the field of nuclear safety with a demonstrated competence and knowledge relevant to the independent investigative and oversight functions of the board. The National Academy of Sciences maintains a list of individuals who meet these qualifications, which assists the President in selecting individuals to nominate. A maximum of three members may be members of the same political party. They each serve terms of five years, and, following changes made by the NDAA 2020 § 3203(b)(1)(A), may not be reappointed to a second term, unless they were originally appointed to fill an unexpired term of less than three remaining years. A member may not continue to serve after the end of their term unless that would constitute a loss of quorum for the board. Three members is necessary for the board to have a quorum. The President designates one of the members to serve as chairman and chief executive officer, and another to serve as vice chairman.

=== Board members ===
The current board as of May 24, 2026:

Position	Name	Party	Took office	Term expires
Member	Patricia L. Lee	Democratic	September 4, 2024	October 18, 2027
Member	Vacant			October 18, 2026
Member	Vacant			October 18, 2028
Member	Vacant			October 18, 2029
Member	Vacant			October 18, 2030

== See also ==
- Title 10 of the Code of Federal Regulations
- Waste Isolation Pilot Plant
