= Political appointments of the second Trump administration =

This is a list of political appointments of officeholders made by the 47th president of the United States, Donald Trump.

== Color key ==
Denotes appointees serving in offices that did not require Senate confirmation.
Denotes appointees confirmed by the Senate.
Denotes appointees rejected by the Senate.
Denotes appointees awaiting Senate confirmation.
Denotes appointees serving in an acting capacity.
Denotes Chargé d'affaires serving in an acting capacity.
Denotes appointees who have left office or offices which have been disbanded.
Denotes nominees who were withdrawn prior to being confirmed or assuming office.

== Department of Agriculture ==
Office	Nominee	Assumed office	Left office
Secretary of Agriculture	Brooke Rollins	February 13, 2025 (Confirmed February 13, 2025, 72–28)	
Secretary of Agriculture	Gary Washington	January 20, 2025	February 13, 2025
Deputy Secretary of Agriculture	Stephen Vaden	July 7, 2025 (Confirmed June 10, 2025, 51–44)	

== Department of Commerce ==
Office	Nominee	Assumed office	Left office
Secretary of Commerce	Howard Lutnick	February 21, 2025 (Confirmed February 18, 2025, 51–45)	
Secretary of Commerce	Jeremy Pelter	January 20, 2025	February 21, 2025
Deputy Secretary of Commerce	Paul Dabbar	June 26, 2025 (Confirmed June 25, 2025, 56-40)	
Deputy Secretary of Commerce	Jeremy Pelter	February 21, 2025	June 26, 2025

== Department of Defense ==
Office	Nominee	Assumed office	Left office
Secretary of Defense	Pete Hegseth	January 25, 2025 (Confirmed January 24, 2025, 51–50)	
Secretary of Defense	Robert G. Salesses	January 20, 2025	January 25, 2025
Deputy Secretary of Defense	Stephen Feinberg	March 17, 2025 (Confirmed March 14, 2025, 59–40)	
Deputy Secretary of Defense	Robert G. Salesses	January 28, 2025	March 17, 2025

== Department of Education ==
Office	Nominee	Assumed office	Left office
Secretary of Education	Linda McMahon	March 3, 2025 (Confirmed March 3, 2025, 51–45)	
Secretary of Education	Denise L. Carter	January 20, 2025	March 3, 2025
Deputy Secretary of Education	Nicholas Kent	February 5, 2026	
Deputy Secretary of Education	Richard Smith	January 20, 2025	February 5, 2026

== Department of Energy ==
Office	Nominee	Assumed office	Left office
Secretary of Energy	Chris Wright	February 4, 2025 (Confirmed February 3, 2025, 59–38)	
Secretary of Energy	Ingrid Kolb	January 20, 2025	February 4, 2025
Deputy Secretary of Energy	James Danly	June 11, 2025 (Confirmed May 13, 2025, 52–44)	

== Department of Health and Human Services ==
Office	Nominee	Assumed office	Left office
Secretary of Health and Human Services	Robert F. Kennedy Jr.	February 13, 2025 (Confirmed February 13, 2025, 52–48)	
Secretary of Health and Human Services	Dorothy Fink	January 20, 2025	February 13, 2025
Deputy Secretary of Health and Human Services	Gerard Klomp	Awaiting Senate Confirmation	
Deputy Secretary of Health and Human Services	Jim O'Neill	June 9, 2025 (Confirmed June 5, 2025, 52–43)	February 13, 2026

== Department of Homeland Security ==
Office	Nominee	Assumed office	Left office
Secretary of Homeland Security	Markwayne Mullin	March 24, 2026 (Confirmed March 23, 2026, 54–45)	
Secretary of Homeland Security	Kristi Noem	January 25, 2025 (Confirmed January 25, 2025, 59–34)	March 24, 2026
Secretary of Homeland Security	Benjamine Huffman	January 20, 2025	January 25, 2025
Deputy Secretary of Homeland Security	Troy Edgar	March 8, 2025 (Confirmed March 6, 2025, 53–43)	
Deputy Secretary of Homeland Security	Benjamine Huffman	January 28, 2025	February 4, 2025
Deputy Secretary of Homeland Security	MaryAnn Tierney	January 20, 2025	January 28, 2025

== Department of Housing and Urban Development ==
Office	Nominee	Assumed office	Left office
Secretary of Housing and Urban Development	Scott Turner	February 5, 2025 (Confirmed February 5, 2025, 55–44)	
Secretary of Housing and Urban Development	Matt Ammon	January 20, 2025	February 5, 2025
Deputy Secretary of Housing and Urban Development	Andrew Hughes	June 27, 2025 (Confirmed June 10, 2025, 51–43)	

== Department of the Interior ==
Office	Nominee	Assumed office	Left office
Secretary of the Interior	Doug Burgum	February 1, 2025 (Confirmed January 30, 2025, 80–17)	
Secretary of the Interior	Walter Cruickshank	January 20, 2025	February 1, 2025
Deputy Secretary of the Interior	Katharine MacGregor	June 9, 2025 (Confirmed May 14, 2025, 54–40)	

== Department of Justice ==
Office	Nominee	Assumed office	Left office
Attorney General	Todd Blanche	August 10, 2026 (Confirmed August 8, 2026, 50–49)	
Attorney General	Todd Blanche	April 2, 2026	August 10, 2026
Attorney General	Pam Bondi	February 5, 2025 (Confirmed February 4, 2025, 54–46)	April 2, 2026
Attorney General	James McHenry	January 20, 2025	February 5, 2025
Deputy Attorney General	Trent McCotter	August 10, 2026	
Deputy Attorney General	Todd Blanche	March 6, 2025 (Confirmed March 5, 2025, 52–46)	August 10, 2026
Deputy Attorney General	Emil Bove	January 20, 2025	March 6, 2025

== Department of Labor ==
Office	Nominee	Assumed office	Left office
Secretary of Labor	Keith Sonderling	October 2, 2026 (Confirmed September 30, 2026, 47–41)	
Secretary of Labor	Keith Sonderling	April 20, 2026	October 2, 2026
Secretary of Labor	Lori Chavez-DeRemer	March 11, 2025 (Confirmed March 10, 2025, 67–32)	April 20, 2026
Secretary of Labor	Vince Micone	January 20, 2025	March 11, 2025
Deputy Secretary of Labor	Keith Sonderling	March 14, 2025 (Confirmed March 12, 2025, 53–46)	October 2, 2026

== Department of State ==
Office	Nominee	Assumed office	Left office
Secretary of State	Marco Rubio	January 21, 2025 (Confirmed January 20, 2025, 99–0)	
Secretary of State	Lisa D. Kenna	January 20, 2025	January 21, 2025
Deputy Secretary of State	Christopher Landau	March 25, 2025 (Confirmed March 24, 2025, 60–31)	
Ambassadors to the United Nations
Ambassador to the United Nations	Mike Waltz	September 21, 2025; 1st Vote (Confirmed September 19, 2025, 47–43); 2nd Vote (Confirmed September 29, 2025, 54–45)	
Ambassador to the United Nations	Dorothy Shea	January 20, 2025	September 21, 2025
Deputy Ambassador to the United Nations	Tammy Bruce	December 29, 2025 (Confirmed* December 18, 2025, 53–43); *En bloc confirmation of 97 nominees.	

== Department of Transportation ==
Office	Nominee	Assumed office	Left office
Secretary of Transportation	Sean Duffy	January 28, 2025 (Confirmed January 28, 2025, 77–22)	
Secretary of Transportation	Judith Kaleta	January 20, 2025	January 28, 2025
Deputy Secretary of Transportation	Steven G. Bradbury	March 13, 2025 (Confirmed March 11, 2025, 51–46)	

== Department of the Treasury ==
Office	Nominee	Assumed office	Left office
Secretary of the Treasury	Scott Bessent	January 28, 2025 (Confirmed January 27, 2025, 68–29)	
Secretary of the Treasury	David Lebryk	January 20, 2025	January 28, 2025
Deputy Secretary of the Treasury	Francis Brooke	September 22, 2026 (Confirmed* August 7, 2026, 51–47); *En bloc confirmation of 74 nominees.	
Deputy Secretary of the Treasury	Francis Brooke	April 28, 2026	September 22, 2026
Deputy Secretary of the Treasury	Derek Theurer	October 7, 2025	April 28, 2026
Deputy Secretary of the Treasury	Michael Faulkender	March 28, 2025 (Confirmed March 26, 2025, 53–43)	August 22, 2025
Deputy Secretary of the Treasury	Dan Katz	February 3, 2025	March 28, 2025
Deputy Secretary of the Treasury	David Lebryk	January 20, 2025	January 31, 2025

== Department of Veterans Affairs ==
Office	Nominee	Assumed office	Left office
Secretary of Veterans Affairs	Doug Collins	February 5, 2025 (Confirmed February 4, 2025, 77–23)	
Secretary of Veterans Affairs	Todd B. Hunter	January 20, 2025	February 5, 2025
Deputy Secretary of Veterans Affairs	Paul Lawrence	March 29, 2025 (Confirmed March 27, 2025, 51–45)	
General Counsel of Veterans Affairs	James Baehr	October 15, 2025 (Confirmed* October 7, 2025, 51–47); *En bloc confirmation of 107 nominees.	
Inspector General of Veterans Affairs	Cheryl L. Mason	August 4, 2025 (Confirmed July 31, 2025, 53–45)	
Chief Financial Officer of Veterans Affairs	Richard Topping	July 29, 2025 (Confirmed July 24, 2025, 51–47)	
Under Secretary of Veterans Affairs for Memorial Affairs	Sam Brown	August 1, 2025 (Confirmed July 29, 2025, 54–44)	
Under Secretary of Veterans Affairs for Health	John J. Bartrum	January 9, 2026 (Confirmed* December 18, 2025, 53–43); *En bloc confirmation of 97 nominees.	July 6, 2026
Assistant Secretary for Congressional and Legislative Affairs	Donald Bergin	September 29, 2025 (Confirmed* September 18, 2025, 51–44); *En bloc confirmation of 48 nominees.	
Assistant Secretary of Veterans Affairs (Office of Accountability and Whistleblower Protection)	Michael Tierney	Awaiting Senate Confirmation	
Assistant Secretary of Veterans Affairs (Information and Technology)	Gary Shatswell	Awaiting Senate Confirmation	
Chairman of the Board of Veterans' Appeals	Maria Lopez	Awaiting Senate Confirmation	

== Independent intelligence agencies ==
=== Office of the Director of National Intelligence ===
Office	Nominee	Assumed office	Left office
Director of National Intelligence	Jay Clayton	August 3, 2026 (Confirmed July 28, 2026, 51–47)	
Director of National Intelligence	Bill Pulte	June 19, 2026	August 3, 2026
Director of National Intelligence	Tulsi Gabbard	February 12, 2025 (Confirmed February 12, 2025, 52–48)	June 19, 2026
Director of National Intelligence	Lora Shiao	January 25, 2025	February 12, 2025
Director of National Intelligence	Stacey Dixon	January 20, 2025	January 25, 2025
Principal Deputy Director of National Intelligence	Aaron Lukas	July 24, 2025 (Confirmed July 22, 2025, 51–46)	
Director of the National Counterterrorism Center	Joseph Weirsky	Awaiting Senate Confirmation	
Director of the National Counterterrorism Center	Joe Kent	July 31, 2025 (Confirmed July 30, 2025, 52–44)	March 17, 2026
Director of the National Counterterrorism Center	Don Holstead	January 20, 2025	May 9, 2025
Director of the National Counter Intelligence and Security Center	George Wesley Street	September 19, 2025 (Confirmed* September 18, 2025, 51–44); *En bloc confirmation of 48 nominees.	
General Counsel of the Office of the Director of National Intelligence
General Counsel of the Office of the Director of National Intelligence	Gary Lawkowski	Awaiting Senate Confirmation	
General Counsel of the Office of the Director of National Intelligence	John Dever	October 8, 2025 (Confirmed* October 7, 2025, 51–47); *En bloc confirmation of 107 nominees.	
Inspector General of the Intelligence Community	Christopher Fox	October 16, 2025 (Confirmed* October 7, 2025, 51–47); *En bloc confirmation of 107 nominees.	

=== Central Intelligence Agency ===
Office	Nominee	Assumed office	Left office
Director of the Central Intelligence Agency	John Ratcliffe	January 23, 2025 (Confirmed January 23, 2025, 74–25)	
Director of the Central Intelligence Agency	Tom Sylvester	January 20, 2025	January 23, 2025
Deputy Director of the Central Intelligence Agency	Michael Ellis	February 10, 2025 (Appointed by the President)	
General Counsel of the Central Intelligence Agency	Joshua Simmons	January 8, 2026 (Confirmed January 6, 2026, 53–47)	
Inspector General of the Central Intelligence Agency	Peter Thomson	September 19, 2025 (Confirmed* September 18, 2025, 51–44); *En bloc confirmation of 48 nominees.	

== Cabinet-level independent agencies ==
=== Environmental Protection Agency ===
Office	Nominee	Assumed office	Left office
Administrator of the Environmental Protection Agency	Lee Zeldin	January 29, 2025 (Confirmed January 29, 2025, 56–42)	
Administrator of the Environmental Protection Agency	James Payne	January 20, 2025	January 29, 2025
Deputy Administrator of the Environmental Protection Agency	David Fotouhi	June 16, 2025 (Confirmed June 10, 2025, 53–41)	
Deputy Administrator of the Environmental Protection Agency	Chad McIntosh	January 29, 2025	June 16, 2025
General Counsel of the Environmental Protection Agency	Sean Donahue	May 22, 2025 (Confirmed May 15, 2025, 51–46)	
Chief Financial Officer of the Environmental Protection Agency	Catherine Hanson	August 6, 2025 (Confirmed August 2, 2025, 50-45)	
Assistant Administrator of the Environmental Protection Agency for Chemical Safety and Pollution Prevention	Douglas Troutman	December 2025 (Confirmed* December 18, 2025, 53–43); *En bloc confirmation of 97 nominees.	
Assistant Administrator of the Environmental Protection Agency for Air and Radiation	Justin Schwab	Awaiting Senate Confirmation	
Assistant Administrator of the Environmental Protection Agency for Air and Radiation	Aaron Szabo	August 25, 2025 (Confirmed July 23, 2025, 49–47)	July 17, 2026
Assistant Administrator of the Environmental Protection Agency for Water	Jessica Kramer	September 22, 2025 (Confirmed* September 18, 2025, 51–44); *En bloc confirmation of 48 nominees.	
Assistant Administrator of the Environmental Protection Agency for Enforcement and Compliance Assurance	Jeffrey Hall	January 2026 (Confirmed* December 18, 2025, 53–43); *En bloc confirmation of 97 nominees.	
Assistant Administrator of the Environmental Protection Agency for Solid Waste	John W. Busterud	October 2025 (Confirmed* October 7, 2025, 51–47); *En bloc confirmation of 107 nominees.	March 7, 2026
Assistant Administrator of the Environmental Protection Agency for International and Tribal Affairs	Usha Marie Turner	October 2025 (Confirmed* October 7, 2025, 51–47); *En bloc confirmation of 107 nominees.	

=== Small Business Administration ===
Office	Nominee	Assumed office	Left office
Administrator of the Small Business Administration	Kelly Loeffler	February 20, 2025 (Confirmed February 19, 2025, 52–46)	
Administrator of the Small Business Administration	Everett Woodel	January 20, 2025	February 20, 2025
Deputy Administrator of the Small Business Administration	Bill Briggs	July 23, 2025 (Confirmed July 9, 2025, 49–45)	
Chief Counsel for Advocacy	Casey B. Mulligan	August 5, 2025 (Confirmed August 1, 2025, 52–44)	
Inspector General of the Small Business Administration	William Kirk	January 6, 2026 (Confirmed* December 18, 2025, 53–43); *En bloc confirmation of 97 nominees.	
Associate Administrator for Disaster Recovery and Resilience	Chris Stallings	September 9, 2025 (Appointed by the President)	

== Other independent agencies ==
=== Agency for Global Media ===
Office	Nominee	Assumed office	Left office
CEO of the U.S. Agency for Global Media	Victor Morales	March 25, 2025	July 31, 2025
CEO of the U.S. Agency for Global Media	Michael Rigas	March 12, 2026	
CEO of the U.S. Agency for Global Media	Kari Lake		
CEO of the U.S. Agency for Global Media	Kari Lake	July 31, 2025	November 19, 2025
Deputy CEO of the U.S. Agency for Global Media	Kari Lake	July 31, 2025	November 19, 2025
Senior Advisor to the U.S. Agency for Global Media	Kari Lake	March 3, 2025	
Deputy Director of the U.S. Agency for Global Media	Brian Conniff	Awaiting Senate Confirmation	

=== Agency for International Development ===
Office	Nominee	Assumed office	Left office
Administrator of the United States Agency for International Development	Eric Ueland	November 24, 2025	October 3, 2026
Administrator of the United States Agency for International Development	Russell Vought	August 29, 2025	November 24, 2025
Administrator of the United States Agency for International Development	Marco Rubio	February 3, 2025	August 29, 2025
Administrator of the United States Agency for International Development	Jason Gray	January 20, 2025	February 3, 2025

=== Consumer Financial Protection Bureau ===
Office	Nominee	Assumed office	Left office
Director of the Consumer Financial Protection Bureau	Brian Johnson	Awaiting Senate Confirmation	
Director of the Consumer Financial Protection Bureau	Mark Paoletta	August 1, 2026	
Director of the Consumer Financial Protection Bureau	Russell Vought	February 7, 2025	August 1, 2026
Director of the Consumer Financial Protection Bureau	Scott Bessent	February 3, 2025	February 7, 2025

=== Export–Import Bank ===
Office	Nominee	Assumed office	Left office
Chairman and President of the Export–Import Bank of the United States	John Jovanovic	September 19, 2025 (Confirmed* September 18, 2025, 51–44); *En bloc confirmation of 48 nominees.	
Chairman and President of the Export–Import Bank of the United States	James C. Cruse	February 28, 2025	September 19, 2025
Chairman and President of the Export–Import Bank of the United States	Spencer Bachus	January 30, 2025	February 28, 2025
Vice Chairman and Vice President of the Export–Import Bank of the United States	David Slade	Awaiting Senate Confirmation	
Vice Chairman and Vice President of the Export–Import Bank of the United States	James G. Burrows, Jr.	February 28, 2025	
Member of the Board of Directors of the Export–Import Bank of the United States	Michael Rigas	Awaiting Senate Confirmation	
Member of the Board of Directors of the Export–Import Bank of the United States	Michael Rigas	Awaiting Senate Confirmation (Reappointment)	

=== Farm Credit Administration ===
Office	Nominee	Assumed office	Left office
Chairman of the Farm Credit Administration	Jeffery S. Hall	January 20, 2025	
Member of the Farm Credit Administration	Carl Bednarski	Awaiting Senate Confirmation	
Member of the Farm Credit Administration	Carl Bednarski	Awaiting Reappointment	
Member of the Farm Credit Administration	John Grunewald II	Awaiting Senate Confirmation	
Member of the Farm Credit Administration	James R. Middleton	Awaiting Senate Confirmation	

=== Federal Deposit Insurance Corporation ===
Office	Nominee	Assumed office	Left office
Chairman of the Federal Deposit Insurance Corporation	Travis Hill	January 13, 2026 (Confirmed* December 18, 2025, 53–43); *En bloc confirmation of 97 nominees.	
Chairman of the Federal Deposit Insurance Corporation	Travis Hill	January 20, 2025	January 13, 2026

=== Federal Housing Finance Agency ===
Office	Nominee	Assumed office	Left office
Director of the Federal Housing Finance Agency	Bill Pulte	March 14, 2025 (Confirmed March 13, 2025, 56–43)	

=== Federal Labor Relations Authority ===
Office	Nominee	Assumed office	Left office
Chair of the Federal Labor Relations Authority	Colleen Kiko	February 11, 2025	
Member of the Federal Labor Relations Authority	Charles Arrington	January 6, 2026 (Confirmed* December 18, 2025, 53–43); *En bloc confirmation of 97 nominees.	
General Counsel of the Federal Labor Relations Authority	Charlton Allen	August 20, 2026 (Confirmed* August 7, 2026, 51–47); *En bloc confirmation of 74 nominees.	

=== Federal Reserve System ===
Office	Nominee	Assumed office	Left office
Chair of the Federal Reserve	Kevin Warsh	May 22, 2026 (Confirmed May 13, 2026, 54–45)	
Vice Chair of the Federal Reserve for Supervision	Michelle Bowman	June 9, 2025 (Confirmed June 4, 2025, 48–46)	
Member of the Federal Reserve Board of Governors	Kevin Warsh	May 22, 2026 (Confirmed May 12, 2026, 51–45)	
Member of the Federal Reserve Board of Governors	Stephen Miran	September 16, 2025 (Confirmed September 15, 2025, 48–47)	May 22, 2026

=== General Services Administration ===
Office	Nominee	Assumed office	Left office
Administrator of General Services	Edward Forst	December 24, 2025 (Confirmed* December 18, 2025, 53–43); *En bloc confirmation of 97 nominees.	
Administrator of General Services	Michael Rigas	July 21, 2025	December 24, 2025
Administrator of General Services	Stephen Ehikian	January 20, 2025	July 21, 2025
Inspector General of the General Services Administration	Maria D' Avanzo	Awaiting Senate Confirmation	

=== Institute of Museum and Library Services ===
Office	Nominee	Assumed office	Left office
Director of the Institute of Museum and Library Services	Keith Sonderling	March 20, 2025	

=== International Development Finance Corporation ===
Office	Nominee	Assumed office	Left office
CEO of the U.S. International Development Finance Corporation	Benjamin Black	October 7, 2025 (Confirmed* October 7, 2025, 51–47); *En bloc confirmation of 107 nominees.	

=== Library of Congress ===
Office	Nominee	Assumed office	Left office
Librarian of Congress	Todd Blanche	May 12, 2025 (disputed)	?

=== Metropolitan Washington Airports Authority ===
Office	Nominee	Assumed office	Left office
Member of the Board of Directors of the Metropolitan Washington Airports Authority	Trent Morse	January 21, 2026 (Confirmed* December 18, 2025, 53–43); *En bloc confirmation of 97 nominees.	

=== National Aeronautics and Space Administration ===
Office	Nominee	Assumed office	Left office
Administrator of the National Aeronautics and Space Administration	Jared Isaacman	December 18, 2025 (Confirmed December 17, 2025, 67–30)	
Administrator of the National Aeronautics and Space Administration	Sean Duffy	July 9, 2025	December 18, 2025
Administrator of the National Aeronautics and Space Administration	Janet Petro	January 20, 2025	July 9, 2025
Deputy Administrator of the National Aeronautics and Space Administration	Matthew P. Anderson	May 21, 2026 (Confirmed* May 18, 2026, 46–43); *En bloc confirmation of 49 nominees.	
Chief Financial Officer of the National Aeronautics and Space Administration	Joshua Shoemaker	Awaiting Senate Confirmation	
Inspector General of the National Aeronautics and Space Administration	Robert Steinau	Awaiting Senate Confirmation	

=== National Archives and Records Administration ===
Office	Nominee	Assumed office	Left office
Archivist of the United States	Bradford Wilson	August 21, 2026 (Confirmed* August 7, 2026, 51–47); *En bloc confirmation of 74 nominees.	
Archivist of the United States	Edward Forst	April 3, 2026	August 21, 2026
Archivist of the United States	Marco Rubio	February 16, 2025	February 4, 2026
Archivist of the United States	William J. Bosanko	February 7, 2025	February 16, 2025
Senior Advisor to the Archivist of the United States	Jim Byron	February 16, 2025	

=== National Credit Union Administration ===
Office	Nominee	Assumed office	Left office
Chairman of the National Credit Union Administration Board	John Crews	August 24, 2026	
Chairman of the National Credit Union Administration Board	Kyle S. Hauptman	January 20, 2025	August 10, 2026
Member of the National Credit Union Administration Board	John Crews	August 19, 2026 (Confirmed* August 7, 2026, 51–47); *En bloc confirmation of 74 nominees.	

=== National Endowment for the Arts ===
Office	Nominee	Assumed office	Left office
Chairman of the National Endowment for the Arts	Mary Anne Carter	December 19, 2025 (Confirmed* December 18, 2025, 53–43); *En bloc confirmation of 97 nominees.	

=== National Endowment for the Humanities ===
Office	Nominee	Assumed office	Left office
Chairman of the National Endowment for the Humanities	Michael McDonald	August 18, 2026 (Confirmed* August 7, 2026, 51–47); *En bloc confirmation of 74 nominees.	

=== National Railroad Passenger Corporation ===
Office	Nominee	Assumed office	Left office
Board of Directors of National Railroad Passenger Corporation	Robert Gleason	September 24, 2025 (Confirmed* September 18, 2025, 51–44); *En bloc confirmation of 48 nominees.	

=== National Science Foundation ===
Office	Nominee	Assumed office	Left office
Director of the National Science Foundation	Jim O'Neill	Awaiting Senate Confirmation	

=== Office of Government Ethics ===
Office	Nominee	Assumed office	Left office
Director of the Office of Government Ethics	Michael Chamberlain	Awaiting Senate Confirmation	
Director of the Office of Government Ethics	Keith Sonderling	June 23, 2026	
Director of the Office of Government Ethics	Eric Ueland	August 26, 2025	December 2025
Director of the Office of Government Ethics	Jamieson Greer	April 1, 2025	August 26, 2025
Director of the Office of Government Ethics	Doug Collins	February 12, 2025	April 1, 2025
Director of the Office of Government Ethics	Shelley Finlayson	February 10, 2025	February 12, 2025

=== Office of Personnel Management ===
Office	Nominee	Assumed office	Left office
Director of the Office of Personnel Management	Scott Kupor	July 14, 2025 (Confirmed July 9, 2025, 49–46)	
Director of the Office of Personnel Management	Charles Ezell	January 20, 2025	July 14, 2025

=== Office of Special Counsel ===
Office	Nominee	Assumed office	Left office
Special Counsel of the United States	Charles Baldis	September 30, 2026 (Confirmed* August 7, 2026, 51–47); *En bloc confirmation of 74 nominees.	
Special Counsel of the United States	Jamieson Greer	April 1, 2025	September 30, 2026
Special Counsel of the United States	Doug Collins	March 5, 2025	April 1, 2025

=== Peace Corps ===
Office	Nominee	Assumed office	Left office
Director of the Peace Corps	Riley Barnes	Awaiting Senate Confirmation	

=== Pension Benefit Guaranty Corporation ===
Office	Nominee	Assumed office	Left office
Director of the Pension Benefit Guaranty Corporation	Janet Dhillon	November 3, 2025 (Confirmed* October 7, 2025, 51–47); *En bloc confirmation of 107 nominees.	
Director of the Pension Benefit Guaranty Corporation	Alice Maroni	March 17, 2025	November 3, 2025

=== Social Security Administration ===
Office	Nominee	Assumed office	Left office
Commissioner of the Social Security Administration	Frank Bisignano	May 7, 2025 (Confirmed May 6, 2025, 53–47)	
Commissioner of the Social Security Administration	Leland Dudek	February 16, 2025	May 7, 2025
Commissioner of the Social Security Administration	Michelle King	January 20, 2025	February 16, 2025
Deputy Commissioner of the Social Security Admimistration	Arjun Mody	January 5, 2026 (Confirmed* December 18, 2025, 53–43); *En bloc confirmation of 97 nominees.	

=== Tennessee Valley Authority ===
Office	Nominee	Assumed office	Left office
Member of the Board of Directors of the Tennessee Valley Authority	Mitch Graves	January 12, 2026 (Confirmed* December 18, 2025, 53–43); *En bloc confirmation of 97 nominees.	
Member of the Board of Directors of the Tennessee Valley Authority	Jeff Hagood	January 12, 2026 (Confirmed* December 18, 2025, 53–43); *En bloc confirmation of 97 nominees.	
Member of the Board of Directors of the Tennessee Valley Authority	Randall Jones	January 12, 2026 (Confirmed* December 18, 2025, 53–43); *En bloc confirmation of 97 nominees.	
Member of the Board of Directors of the Tennessee Valley Authority	Arthur Graham	January 12, 2026 (Confirmed* December 18, 2025, 53–43); *En bloc confirmation of 97 nominees.	
Member of the Board of Directors of the Tennessee Valley Authority	Lee Beaman	Awaiting Senate Confirmation	

=== Independent Boards ===
Office	Nominee	Assumed office	Left office
Merit Systems Protection Board
Chairman of the Merit Systems Protection Board	James Woodruff II	August 21, 2026 (Confirmed* August 7, 2026, 51–47); *En bloc confirmation of 74 nominees.	
Chairman of the Merit Systems Protection Board	Henry Kerner	January 20, 2025	August 21, 2026
Member of the Merit Systems Protection Board	James Woodruff II	October 28, 2025 (Confirmed* October 7, 2025, 51–47); *En bloc confirmation of 107 nominees.	
National Labor Relations Board
Chairman of the National Labor Relations Board	James Murphy	March 26, 2026	
Chairman of the National Labor Relations Board	Marvin Kaplan	January 20, 2025	August 27, 2025
Member of the National Labor Relations Board	Scott Mayer	January 7, 2026 (Confirmed* December 18, 2025, 53–43); *En bloc confirmation of 97 nominees.	
Member of the National Labor Relations Board	James Murphy	January 7, 2026 (Confirmed* December 18, 2025, 53–43); *En bloc confirmation of 97 nominees.	
Member of the National Labor Relations Board	David Prouty	Reappointment (Confirmed* August 7, 2026, 51–47); *En bloc confirmation of 74 nominees.	
Member of the National Labor Relations Board	James Macy	August 17, 2026 (Confirmed* August 7, 2026, 51–47); *En bloc confirmation of 74 nominees.	
General Counsel of the National Labor Relations Board	Crystal Carey	January 7, 2026 (Confirmed* December 18, 2025, 53–43); *En bloc confirmation of 97 nominees.	
General Counsel of the National Labor Relations Board	William B. Cowen	February 3, 2025	January 7, 2026
National Mediation Board
Member of the National Mediation Board	Douglas Ralph	Awaiting Senate Confirmation	
Member of the National Mediation Board	Loren E. Sweatt	Awaiting Reappointment	
National Transportation Safety Board
Member of the National Transportation Safety Board	John DeLeeuw	March 16, 2026 (Confirmed February 25, 2026, 50–45)	
Member of the National Transportation Safety Board	Michael E. Graham	Reappointment (Confirmed* May 18, 2026, 46–43); *En bloc confirmation of 49 nominees.	
Member of the National Transportation Safety Board	Thomas B. Chapman	Reappointment (Confirmed* August 7, 2026, 51–47); *En bloc confirmation of 74 nominees.	
Surface Transportation Board
Chairman of the Surface Transportation Board	Patrick Fuchs	January 20, 2025	
Member of the Surface Transportation Board	Michelle A. Schultz	Reappointment (Confirmed* December 18, 2025, 53–43); *En bloc confirmation of 97 nominees.	
Member of the Surface Transportation Board	Richard Kloster	June 5, 2026 (Confirmed* May 18, 2026, 46–43); *En bloc confirmation of 49 nominees.	
Member of the Surface Transportation Board	Karen Hedlund	Reappointment (Confirmed* August 7, 2026, 51–47); *En bloc confirmation of 74 nominees.	
Board of Governors of the United States Postal Service
Member of the Board of Governors of the United States Postal Service	Anthony Lomangino	Awaiting Senate Confirmation	
Member of the Board of Governors of the United States Postal Service	Robert Steffens	Awaiting Senate Confirmation	
Member of the Board of Governors of the United States Postal Service	William Gallo	Awaiting Senate Confirmation	
Member of the Board of Governors of the United States Postal Service	Jeffrey Brodsky	Awaiting Senate Confirmation	

=== Independent Commissions ===
Office	Nominee	Assumed office	Left office
Commission on Civil Rights
Chairman of the Commission on Civil Rights	Peter Kirsanow	January 20, 2025	
Vice Chairman of the Commission on Civil Rights	Steven Gilchrest	January 20, 2025	
Commodity Futures Trading Commission
Chairman of the Commodity Futures Trading Commission	Michael Selig	December 22, 2025 (Confirmed* December 18, 2025, 53–43); *En bloc confirmation of 97 nominees.	
Chairman of the Commodity Futures Trading Commission	Caroline Pham	January 20, 2025	December 22, 2025
Member of the Commodity Futures Trading Commission	Michael Selig	December 22, 2025 (Confirmed* December 18, 2025, 53–43); *En bloc confirmation of 97 nominees.	
Member of the Commodity Futures Trading Commission	Nathan Anonick	Awaiting Senate Confirmation	
Member of the Commodity Futures Trading Commission	Matthew Rowland	Awaiting Senate Confirmation	
Consumer Product Safety Commission
Chairman of the Consumer Product Safety Commission	Peter Feldman	Awaiting Senate Confirmation	
Chairman of the Consumer Product Safety Commission	Peter Feldman	January 21, 2025	
Commissioner of the Consumer Product Safety Commission	Karen Sessions	August 19, 2026 (Confirmed* August 7, 2026, 51–47); *En bloc confirmation of 74 nominees.	
Commissioner of the Consumer Product Safety Commission	Brien Lorenze	September 8, 2026 (Confirmed* August 7, 2026, 51–47); *En bloc confirmation of 74 nominees.	
Commissioner of the Consumer Product Safety Commission	Peter Feldman	Awaiting Reappointment	
Equal Employment Opportunity Commission
Chairwoman of the Equal Employment Opportunity Commission	Andrea R. Lucas	November 6, 2025	
Chairwoman of the Equal Employment Opportunity Commission	Andrea R. Lucas	January 20, 2025	November 6, 2025
Member of the Equal Employment Opportunity Commission	Andrea R. Lucas	Reappointment (Confirmed July 31, 2025, 52–45)	
Member of the Equal Employment Opportunity Commission	Brittany Panuccio	October 27, 2025 (Confirmed* October 7, 2025, 51–47); *En bloc confirmation of 107 nominees.	
Member of the Equal Employment Opportunity Commission	Matthew Zandi	Awaiting Senate Confirmation	
General Counsel of the Equal Employment Opportunity Commission	Catherine Eschbach	Awaiting Senate Confirmation	
General Counsel of the Equal Employment Opportunity Commission	Catherine Eschbach	November 5, 2025	
General Counsel of the Equal Employment Opportunity Commission	Andrew Rogers	January 20, 2025	November 5, 2025
Federal Communications Commission
Chairman of the Federal Communications Commission	Brendan Carr	January 20, 2025	
Commissioner of the Federal Communications Commission	Olivia Trusty	June 23, 2025 (Confirmed June 17, 2025, 53–45)	
Commissioner of the Federal Communications Commission	Olivia Trusty	Reappointment (Confirmed June 18, 2025, 53–45)	
Commissioner of the Federal Communications Commission	Danielle Thumann	Awaiting Senate Confirmation	
Federal Election Commission
Member of the Federal Election Commission	Ashley Stow	Awaiting Senate Confirmation	
Member of the Federal Election Commission	Andrew Woodson	Awaiting Senate Confirmation	
Federal Energy Regulatory Commission
Chairman of the Federal Energy Regulatory Commission	Laura Swett	October 23, 2025	
Chairman of the Federal Energy Regulatory Commission	David Rosner	August 13, 2025	October 23, 2025
Chairman of the Federal Energy Regulatory Commission	Mark Christie	January 20, 2025	August 8, 2025
Member of the Federal Energy Regulatory Commission	Laura Swett	October 20, 2025 (Confirmed* October 7, 2025, 51–47); *En bloc confirmation of 107 nominees.	
Member of the Federal Energy Regulatory Commission	David LaCerte	October 27, 2025 (Confirmed* October 7, 2025, 51–47); *En bloc confirmation of 107 nominees.	
Member of the Federal Energy Regulatory Commission	David LaCerte	Reappointment (Confirmed* May 18, 2026, 46–43); *En bloc confirmation of 49 nominees.	
Federal Maritime Commission
Chairman of the Federal Maritime Commission	Laura DiBella	January 28, 2026	
Chairman of the Federal Maritime Commission	Louis E. Sola	January 20, 2025	June 30, 2025
Member of the Federal Maritime Commission	Laura DiBella	January 6, 2026 (Confirmed* December 18, 2025, 53–43); *En bloc confirmation of 97 nominees.	
Member of the Federal Maritime Commission	Robert Harvey	June 1, 2026 (Confirmed* May 18, 2026, 46–43); *En bloc confirmation of 49 nominees.	
Federal Mine Safety and Health Review Commission
Chairman of the Federal Mine Safety and Health Review Commission	Marco M. Rajkovich Jr.	November 20, 2025	
Member of the Federal Mine Safety and Health Review Commission	Marco M. Rajkovich Jr.	October 24, 2025 (Confirmed* October 7, 2025, 51–47); *En bloc confirmation of 107 nominees.	
Federal Trade Commission
Chairman of the Federal Trade Commission	Andrew N. Ferguson	January 20, 2025	
Commissioner of the Federal Trade Commission	Mark Meador	April 16, 2025 (Confirmed April 10, 2025, 50–46)	
Commissioner of the Federal Trade Commission	Christopher Mufarrige	Awaiting Senate Confirmation	
Nuclear Regulatory Commission
Chairman of the Nuclear Regulatory Commission	Ho Nieh	January 8, 2026	
Chairman of the Nuclear Regulatory Commission	David A. Wright	August 1, 2025	January 8, 2026
Chairman of the Nuclear Regulatory Commission	David A. Wright	January 20, 2025	June 30, 2025
Member of the Nuclear Regulatory Commission	David A. Wright	August 1, 2025 (Confirmed July 28, 2025, 50–39)	
Member of the Nuclear Regulatory Commission	Ho Nieh	December 4, 2025 (Confirmed November 19, 2025, 66–32)	
Member of the Nuclear Regulatory Commission	Doug W. Weaver	December 22, 2025 (Confirmed December 17, 2025, 71–29)	
Member of the Nuclear Regulatory Commission	Doug W. Weaver	Reappointment (Confirmed* May 18, 2026, 46–43); *En bloc confirmation of 49 nominees.	
Occupational Safety and Health Review Commission
Chairman of the Occupational Safety and Health Review Commission	Jonathan Snare	November 24, 2025	
Member of the Occupational Safety and Health Review Commission	Jonathan Snare	November 3, 2025 (Confirmed* October 7, 2025, 51–47); *En bloc confirmation of 107 nominees.	
Member of the Occupational Safety and Health Review Commission	Mike Doyle	Awaiting Senate Confirmation	
Postal Regulatory Commission
Member of the Postal Regulatory Commission	Jeffrey Zisk	Awaiting Senate Confirmation	
Member of the Postal Regulatory Commission	Jeffrey Zisk	Awaiting Reappointment	
Religious Liberty Commission
Chairman of the Religious Liberty Commission	Dan Patrick	May 1, 2025	
Vice Chairman of the Religious Liberty Commission	Ben Carson	May 1, 2025	
Commissioners of the Religious Liberty Commission	Ryan T. Anderson	May 1, 2025	
Commissioners of the Religious Liberty Commission	Robert Barron	May 1, 2025	
Commissioners of the Religious Liberty Commission	Carrie Prejean Boller	May 1, 2025	February 11, 2026
Commissioners of the Religious Liberty Commission	Timothy M. Dolan	May 1, 2025	
Commissioners of the Religious Liberty Commission	Franklin Graham	May 1, 2025	
Commissioners of the Religious Liberty Commission	Allyson Ho	May 1, 2025	
Commissioners of the Religious Liberty Commission	Phil McGraw	May 1, 2025	
Commissioners of the Religious Liberty Commission	Eric Metaxas	May 1, 2025	
Commissioners of the Religious Liberty Commission	Kelly Shackelford	May 1, 2025	
Commissioners of the Religious Liberty Commission	Meir Soloveichik	May 1, 2025	
Commissioners of the Religious Liberty Commission	Paula White	May 1, 2025	
United States International Trade Commission
Chairman of the United States International Trade Commission	Brett W. Doyle	July 20, 2026	
Commissioner of the United States International Trade Commission	Brett W. Doyle	July 17, 2026 (Confirmed July 16, 2026, Voice Vote)	
Commissioner of the United States International Trade Commission	Peter-Anthony Pappas	August 3, 2026 (Confirmed July 16, 2026, Voice Vote)	
Commissioner of the United States International Trade Commission	David Foley, Jr.	August 17, 2026 (Confirmed July 16, 2026, Voice Vote)	
Commissioner of the United States International Trade Commission	Bartholomew Thanhauser	August 17, 2026 (Confirmed July 16, 2026, Voice Vote)	
Commissioner of the United States International Trade Commission	Samuel Negatu	September 10, 2026 (Confirmed July 16, 2026, Voice Vote)	
Securities and Exchange Commission
Chairman of the Securities and Exchange Commission	Paul S. Atkins	April 21, 2025	
Chairman of the Securities and Exchange Commission	Mark Uyeda	January 20, 2025	April 21, 2025
Commissioner of the Securities and Exchange Commission	Paul S. Atkins	April 21, 2025 (Confirmed April 9, 2025, 50–46)	
Commissioner of the Securities and Exchange Commission	Paul S. Atkins	Reappointment (Confirmed* October 7, 2025, 51–47); *En bloc confirmation of 107 nominees.	
Commissioner of the Securities and Exchange Commission	Kristin N. Johnson	Awaiting Senate Confirmation	
Commissioner of the Securities and Exchange Commission	Steven Levine	Awaiting Senate Confirmation	
United States Sentencing Commission
Commissioner of the United States Sentencing Commission	John P. Cronan	Awaiting Senate Confirmation	
Commissioner of the United States Sentencing Commission	Jason Manion	Awaiting Senate Confirmation	
Commissioner of the United States Sentencing Commission	Luis Felipe Restrepo	Awaiting Reappointment	
Commissioner of the United States Sentencing Commission	Claire McCusker Murray	Awaiting Reappointment	

== Other organizations ==
=== African Development Bank ===
Office	Nominee	Assumed office	Left office
United States Director of the African Development Bank	Ademola Adewale-Sadik	TBD (Confirmed* May 18, 2026, 46–43); *En bloc confirmation of 49 nominees.	

=== Asian Development Bank ===
Office	Nominee	Assumed office	Left office
United States Director of the Asian Development Bank (with the rank of Ambassador)	Robert Sweeney	May 18, 2026 (Confirmed* May 18, 2026, 46–43); *En bloc confirmation of 49 nominees.	

=== Millennium Challenge Corporation ===
Office	Nominee	Assumed office	Left office
CEO of the Millennium Challenge Corporation	Elliot Hulse	Awaiting Senate Confirmation	

== Withdrawn candidates ==
Office	Nominee	Announced	Withdrawn
Attorney General	Matt Gaetz	November 13, 2024	November 21, 2024
Administrator of the Drug Enforcement Administration	Chad Chronister	December 1, 2024	December 3, 2024
Leader of the Department of Government Efficiency	Vivek Ramaswamy	November 12, 2024	January 20, 2025
United States Attorney for the District of New Jersey	Doug Steinhardt	January 22, 2025	February 21, 2025
Director of the Centers for Disease Control and Prevention	Dave Weldon	November 22, 2024	March 13, 2025
Special Envoy for Hostage Affairs	Adam Boehler	December 4, 2024	March 14, 2025
CEO of the U.S. Agency for Global Media	L. Brent Bozell III	January 22, 2025	March 24, 2025
Ambassador to the United Nations	Elise Stefanik	November 10, 2024	March 27, 2025
Director of the Bureau of Land Management	Kathleen Sgamma	February 12, 2025	April 10, 2025
Surgeon General	Janette Nesheiwat	November 22, 2024	May 7, 2025
United States Attorney for the District of Columbia	Ed Martin	January 22, 2025	May 8, 2025
Assistant Secretary of Veterans Affairs (Office of Accountability and Whistleblower Protection)	Cheryl L. Mason	March 11, 2025	May 6, 2025
Administrator of the United States Maritime Administration	Brent D. Sadler	March 24, 2025	May 6, 2025
Director of the Consumer Financial Protection Bureau	Jonathan McKernan	February 11, 2025	May 12, 2025
Assistant Secretary of Defense for Special Operations and Low-Intensity Conflict	Michael Jensen	February 3, 2025	May 12, 2025
Special Counsel of the United States	Charlton Allen	May 6, 2025	May 12, 2025
Under Secretary of Veterans Affairs for Health	John Bartrum	March 10, 2025	June 2, 2025
Assistant Secretary of Veterans Affairs for Information and Technology	Alan Boehme	June 16, 2025	June 30, 2025
Assistant Secretary of Commerce for Industry and Analysis	David Rader	February 11, 2025	July 17, 2025
Under Secretary of Homeland Security for Management	Karen Evans	March 24, 2025	July 17, 2025
Assistant Secretary of Veterans Affairs for Information and Technology	Ryan Cote	June 30, 2025	July 17, 2025
Member of the Board of Governors of the United States Postal Service	John LaValle	June 16, 2025	August 1, 2025
General Counsel of Education	Jennifer Mascott	February 11, 2025	September 2, 2025
Deputy Secretary of Education	Penny Schwinn	January 17, 2025	September 3, 2025
United States Attorney for the Western District of Virginia	Todd Gilbert	June 30, 2025	September 3, 2025
Chairman of the Board of Veterans' Appeals	Terrence Gorman	August 1, 2025	September 3, 2025
United States Attorney for the Eastern District of Virginia	Erik Siebert	May 6, 2025	September 29, 2025
Assistant Secretary of State for Political-Military Affairs	Christopher Pratt	February 11, 2025	September 29, 2025
Commissioner of the Bureau of Reclamation	Theodore Cooke	June 16, 2025	September 30, 2025
Chair of the Commodity Futures Trading Commission	Brian Quintenz	February 11, 2025	September 30, 2025
Commissioner of the Commodity Futures Trading Commission	Brian Quintenz	February 11, 2025	September 30, 2025
Inspector General of Housing and Urban Development	Jeremy Ellis	June 16, 2025	September 30, 2025
Commissioner of the Bureau of Labor Statistics	E.J. Antoni	September 3, 2025	September 30, 2025
Member of the Farm Credit Administration	Jeffrey Kaufmann	September 10, 2025	September 30, 2025
Ambassador to Serbia	Mark Brnovich	April 29, 2025	October 2, 2025
Under Secretary of Veterans Affairs for Benefits	Karen L. Brazell	June 16, 2025	October 8, 2025
Assistant Secretary of Education for Career, Technical, and Adult Education	Kevin O'Farrell	February 11, 2025	October 21, 2025
Under Secretary of Defense (Comptroller)/CFO	Jeff Bornstein	May 6, 2025	October 21, 2025
Special Counsel of the United States	Paul Ingrassia	June 16, 2025	October 22, 2025
Assistant Secretary of State for Near Eastern Affairs	Joel Rayburn	February 11, 2025	October 27, 2025
General Counsel of the Internal Revenue Service	Donald Korb	April 29, 2025	November 18, 2025
Director of the Consumer Financial Protection Bureau	Stuart Levenbach	November 18, 2025	January 3, 2026
Commissioner of the Consumer Product Safety Commission	Billy Hewes	October 2, 2025	March 12, 2026
General Counsel of the Equal Employment Opportunity Commission	Carter Crow	November 18, 2025	April 27, 2026
Director of the National Park Service	Scott Socha	February 11, 2026	April 27, 2026
Surgeon General	Casey Means	May 7, 2025	April 30, 2026
United States Marshal for the Northern District of West Virginia	Paul Ferguson	January 13, 2026	June 1, 2026
United States Attorney for the Southern District of New York	Jay Clayton	April 16, 2025	June 11, 2026
Ambassador to Guatemala	Juan Rodriguez	March 9, 2026	July 14, 2026
Assistant Attorney General for the Office of Justice Programs	Konstantinos Ligris	June 24, 2026	July 14, 2026
Representative on the Council of the International Civil Aviation Organization (with the rank of ambassador)	Jeffrey Anderson	January 13, 2026	September 17, 2026
Inspector General of the Department of Education	Heidi Semann	May 11, 2026	September 17, 2026
Director of U.S. Immigration and Customs Enforcement	Lance Schroyer	July 20, 2026	September 17, 2026
Deputy CEO of the U.S. International Development Finance Corporation	Robert Stebbins	August 7, 2026	September 17, 2026
Commissioner of the Federal Trade Commission	David MacNeil	January 13, 2026	November 9, 2026

== Reception ==
On November 14, 2024, Reuters characterized Trump's nominations thus far as rewarding loyalists, with some nominees having notably few qualifications for their proposed job.

A CBS News poll released on November 25, 2024, found that 59% of Americans approve of the presidential transition.

Scott Bessent became the first openly gay person to lead the U.S. Treasury Department, becoming the highest-ranking LGBTQ government official in American history. and the first openly gay U.S. Senate-confirmed Cabinet member in a Republican administration.

== See also ==
- List of ambassadors appointed by Donald Trump (2025–present)
- List of federal judges appointed by Donald Trump
- List of United States attorneys appointed by Donald Trump § Second term

== Notes ==
Confirmation votes

Confirmations by roll call vote

Confirmations by voice vote
