= Trump nominations for independent agencies =

Trump nominations for independent agencies may refer to:

== Independent intelligence agencies ==
- Political appointments of the first Trump administration#Independent intelligence agencies (2017–2021)
- Political appointments of the second Trump administration#Independent intelligence agencies (from 2025)

== Other independent agencies ==
- Political appointments of the first Trump administration#Other independent agencies (2017–2021)
- Political appointments of the second Trump administration#Other independent agencies (from 2025)
