= Railbanking =

Preserving railroad corridors with interim trail use

National Trails System Act Amendments of 1983
- Other short titles: Rails-to-Trails Act
- Long title: An Act to amend the National Trails System Act by designating additional national scenic and historic trails, and for other purposes.
- Enacted by: the 98th United States Congress

Citations
- Public law: Pub. L. 98–11
- Statutes at Large: 97 Stat. 42

Codification
- Acts amended: National Trails System Act
- U.S.C. sections amended: 16 U.S.C. §§ 1247–d

Legislative history
- Introduced in the Senate as S. 271 by Sen. James A. McClure (R‑ID) on January 27, 1983; Signed into law by President Ronald Reagan on March 28, 1983

In the United States, railbanking is a legal mechanism that preserves out-of-service railroad corridors for potential future rail use by converting them into interim multi-use rail trails. Established in 1983 as an amendment to the National Trails System Act—often referred to as the Rails-to-Trails Act—the policy allows a railroad company to reach a voluntary agreement with a public or private trail sponsor, such as a municipality, state agency, or land trust. During this interim use, the trail sponsor assumes full responsibility for the corridor, relieving the railroad of maintenance, liability, and taxation.

Crucially, railbanking prevents a rail line from being legally abandoned. By keeping the corridor under the continuous jurisdiction of the federal Surface Transportation Board (STB), railbanking preempts state laws that would otherwise dissolve the railroad easements and revert the land to adjacent property owners. While the continuous property lines and structural infrastructure like bridges and culverts are preserved, the physical steel rails and wooden ties are typically removed and sold as salvage to make way for an improved trail surface. Because the corridor remains legally intact in the "bank," the railroad retains the right to re-establish active rail service should future economic conditions warrant it.

== History and implementation ==
Railbanking was established in 1983 as an amendment to Section 8(d) of the National Trails System Act, also known as the Rails-to-Trails Act. In places with strict environmental laws and governmental regulations, it is very difficult to restore an abandoned line. Railbanking makes future reactivation easier because the federal government guarantees the railroad the right to restore service, bypassing the lengthy regulatory hurdles of a "total abandonment."

In the 25-year period from 1983 to 2008, 14,184 miles (22,827 km) of railroad were abandoned in the United States. Of that, 56.8% were originally negotiated for railbanking agreements, but only 35.8% (5,079 miles (8,174 km)) ultimately reached a successful agreement. Railroads often choose not to railbank lines, instead selling the land in parcels to surrounding landowners. As of 2026, the United States has completed 26,000 miles of rail trails, of which more than 4,400 miles were created using railbanking.

Since railbanking began in 1983, fewer than twenty railbanked corridors have been approved for reactivation by the Surface Transportation Board (STB). Some of these reactivated corridors had only short sections restored to rail service, while others had the entire corridor reactivated.

=== Infrastructure preservation ===
The land over which railways pass often has many different owners. Without railbanking, on closure, portions of a railway's route revert to former owners who may reuse the land or modify the ground conditions. A single section of a route changed in this way can have serious consequences for the viability of restoring rail service, as the costs of repurchasing the land outweigh the economic benefits.

Even with railbanking, infrastructure is sometimes lost. In some cases, state laws mandate the removal of unused infrastructure, such as a Pennsylvania law requiring the removal of unused railroad overpasses. In other instances, natural disasters may destroy railbanked bridges.

=== State-level policies ===
While railbanking is a federal mechanism, state policies heavily influence its success. For example, the state of Connecticut has taken a uniquely proactive approach. Since the 1970s, the Connecticut Department of Transportation (CDOT) has maintained a policy of acquiring abandoned rail lines for preservation. CDOT frequently transfers these rights-of-way to the Connecticut Department of Energy and Environmental Protection for use as rail trails, with the provision that CDOT may retake ownership if transportation needs arise. Because of this state-level ownership, Connecticut is one of the few states where railbanked corridors avoid the local opposition that often complicates municipal rail-to-trail projects.

== The railbanking process ==
The railbanking process is regulated by the federal Surface Transportation Board (STB) and occurs concurrently with a railroad's attempt to abandon a line. Because railbanking is a voluntary process, a railroad company cannot be forced to railbank a corridor; they must agree to negotiate with a trail sponsor.

=== Initiation and financial assumption ===
The process begins when a railroad files a notice or application of abandonment with the STB, signaling its intent to cease service on a specific line. Before the abandonment is finalized, a qualified public agency or private trail organization (the potential "trail sponsor") may invoke the National Trails Act and file a request to railbank the corridor. As part of this request, the potential trail sponsor must submit a formal Statement of Willingness to Assume Financial Responsibility. This guarantees that the sponsor will take over all management of the corridor, assume full legal liability, and pay any applicable property taxes, completely relieving the railroad of these financial burdens.

=== NITU and CITU issuance ===
If the potential trail sponsor submits a valid request and the railroad agrees to negotiate, the STB pauses the legal abandonment process. Depending on the type of abandonment filing, the STB will issue either a Notice of Interim Trail Use (NITU) or a Certificate of Interim Trail Use (CITU). The issuance of a NITU or CITU is a critical legal step: it prevents the line from being officially abandoned, thereby protecting the corridor's easements from reverting to adjacent property owners under state law.

=== Negotiation and final agreement ===
The NITU or CITU establishes a one year negotiation period for the railroad and the trail sponsor to reach a final agreement. During this window, the two parties negotiate the terms of the transfer, which often involves the sponsor purchasing the corridor or the salvaged materials (such as steel rails and wooden ties) from the railroad. If an agreement is reached, the railbanking arrangement is automatically finalized, and the sponsor may begin converting the corridor into a trail. If the parties fail to reach an agreement and choose not to request an extension from the STB, the NITU or CITU expires. At that point, the railroad is authorized to proceed with a total legal abandonment of the line, which typically results in the dissolution of the easements and the fragmentation of the corridor.

== Legal challenges and property rights ==
Because many historical railroad rights-of-way in the United States were originally acquired as easements rather than purchased outright in fee simple, the implementation of federal railbanking has sparked significant legal disputes. Under standard state property laws, an easement typically dissolves when it is no longer used for its original purpose, and the land reverts to the adjacent property owners. However, because railbanking places the corridor under the continuous jurisdiction of the federal Surface Transportation Board (STB), federal law preempts these state laws, keeping the easement intact even without active rail service.

=== Fifth Amendment takings claims ===
Adjacent landowners have frequently argued that keeping these easements active to create public trails—rather than allowing the land to revert to the property owners upon railway abandonment—constitutes a taking of private property without just compensation, a violation of the Fifth Amendment. In 1990, the United States Supreme Court addressed this in Preseault v. Interstate Commerce Commission. The Court upheld the constitutionality of the railbanking statute, ensuring that defunct railroad lines could be converted into public recreational trails and initiating a large expansion of rail trails across the United States. However, the ruling left open the question of whether individual landowners were owed money. The plaintiffs subsequently sued in the United States Court of Federal Claims. In 1996, the court ruled in Preseault v. United States (100 F.3d 1525) that the conversion of the specific easement across the plaintiffs' land into a public trail did constitute a compensable taking, requiring the federal government to pay the landowners just compensation. This established a precedent where railbanking is legally valid, but the federal government may be held financially liable for compensating adjacent property owners.

=== Local and state jurisdiction ===
Legal conflicts have also arisen between the federal government and local municipalities regarding control over railbanked land. In 2017, the STB ruled that Neosho County, Kansas, violated the National Trails System Act when it foreclosed on and sold three parcels of railbanked land that spanned the full width of the right-of-way. The STB vacated the county's sales, ruling that local foreclosures are preempted by federal law in order to keep the intact rail line available for potential reactivation.

== Notable examples ==
The federal railbanking process has been used to create some of the most highly trafficked and iconic rail trails in the United States. While thousands of miles of corridors have been railbanked, a few prominent examples include:

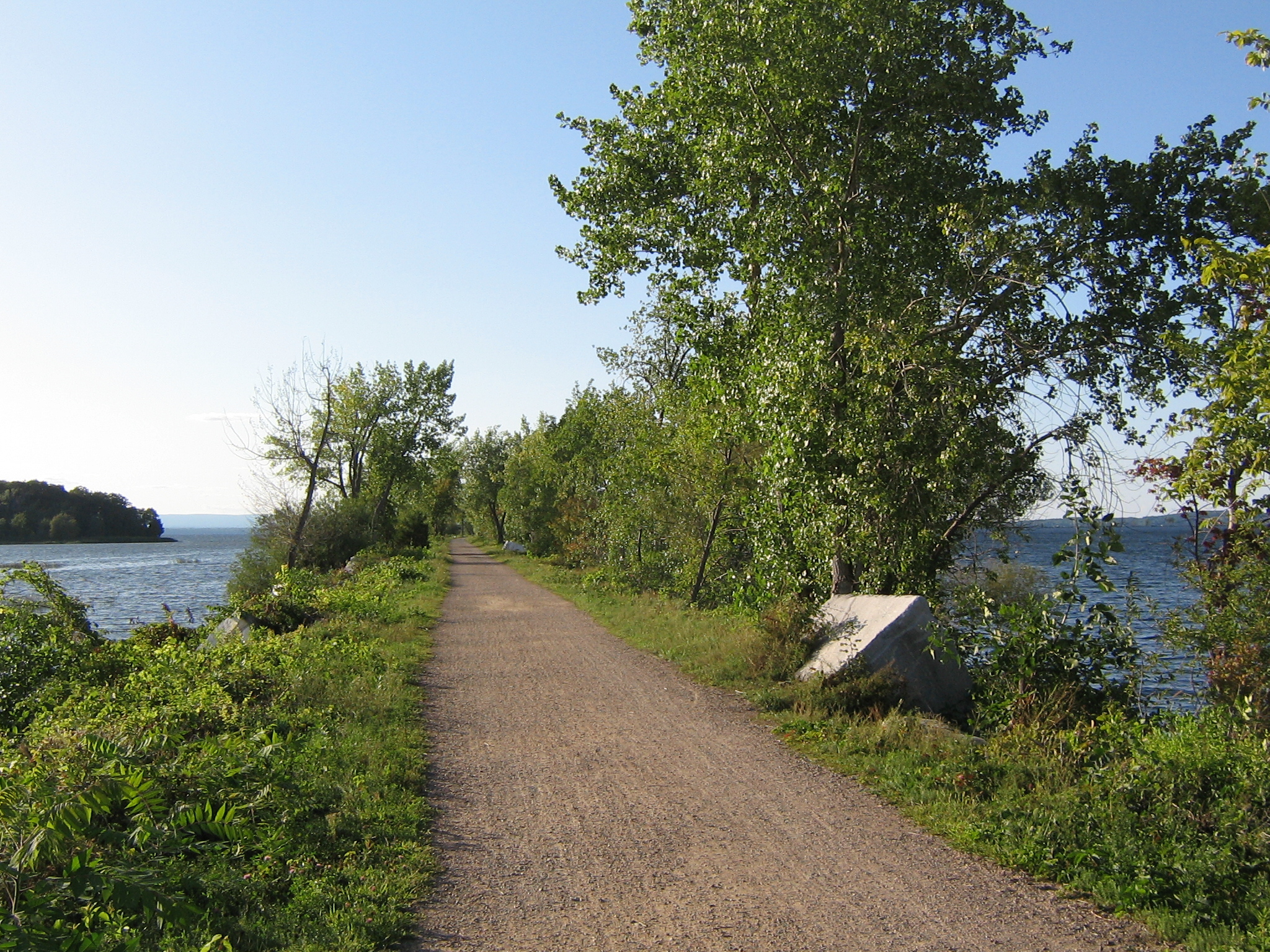
This causeway, now the Island Line Trail via railbanking, once carried the Rutland Railroad over portions of Vermont's largest lake, Lake Champlain

- Island Line Trail (Vermont): Partially built on a causeway traversing Lake Champlain, this trail utilizes the former Rutland Railroad right-of-way. The causeway's preservation through railbanking allowed it to be repurposed into a highly scenic pathway for cyclists and pedestrians, avoiding the prohibitive costs that would have been required to demolish the aquatic infrastructure upon total abandonment.
- Katy Trail (Missouri): Stretching 240 miles across Missouri, the Katy Trail is one of the longest continuous recreational rail trails in the country. It was built on the former right-of-way of the Missouri–Kansas–Texas Railroad (M-K-T). The corridor was one of the earliest major successes of the railbanking statute following the 1983 amendment, aided by a substantial private donation from Edward D. Jones Jr. to help the state acquire the corridor.
- High Line (New York, New York): An internationally recognized linear park built on an elevated freight rail line on Manhattan's West Side. When the line faced demolition, the City of New York and the non-profit Friends of the High Line used the STB's railbanking process to secure a Certificate of Interim Trail Use from CSX Transportation in 2005. By railbanking the viaduct, the city was able to legally preserve the infrastructure and convert it into a public park.
- Cowboy Trail (Nebraska): Spanning over 320 miles, this is the longest railbanked corridor in the United States. Following the former Chicago and North Western Railway line, it was railbanked in the 1990s and transferred to the Nebraska Game and Parks Commission, which converted it into a crushed limestone path that crosses rural landscapes and hundreds of historic railroad bridges.
- The Minuteman Bikeway (Massachusetts), also known as the Minuteman Commuter Bikeway, is a 10-mile (16-kilometre) paved multi-use rail trail located in the Greater Boston area of Massachusetts. It runs from Bedford to Alewife station, at the northern end of the Red Line in Cambridge, passing through the towns of Lexington and Arlington along the way. Also along the route are several notable regional sites, including Alewife Brook Reservation, the Cyrus Dallin Art Museum, Spy Pond, "Arlington’s Great Meadows" (actually located in Lexington), the Battle Green in Lexington, and Hanscom Air Force Base. The property is currently owned by the Massachusetts Bay Transportation Authority and leased to the municipalities through which it passes on an interim basis as the Right Of Way is railbanked.

== Similar international practices ==
=== In the United Kingdom ===
In the United Kingdom, thousands of miles of railway were closed under the Beeching Axe cuts in the 1960s. While several of these routes have subsequently been reopened, none were formally treated as land banks in the US manner. The Beeching closures were driven by the government's desire to reduce expenditure on railways, and so most lines were offered for sale to the highest bidder, a process that frequently led to great fragmentation in the ownership of former UK railway lines and reuse of the land for entirely different purposes. The Ryle Telescope on the former Oxford–Cambridge Varsity Line is possibly the most extreme example, but commercial and residential developments are common.
