= Preseault v. Interstate Commerce Commission =

US Supreme Court case on railbanking

- Supreme Court of the United States

Argued November 1, 1989 Decided February 21, 1990
- Full case name: J. Paul Preseault and Patricia Preseault, Petitioners v. Interstate Commerce Commission, et al.
- Citations: 494 U.S. 1 (more)

Case history
- Prior: Judgment for defendants, 853 F.2d 145 (2d Cir. 1988)

Holding
- The National Trails System Act Amendments of 1983 (the railbanking statute) do not violate the Commerce Clause, nor do they constitute a taking on their face, as property owners have a remedy to seek compensation under the Tucker Act.

Court membership
- Chief Justice William Rehnquist Associate Justices William J. Brennan Jr. · Byron White; Thurgood Marshall · Harry Blackmun; John P. Stevens · Sandra Day O'Connor; Antonin Scalia · Anthony Kennedy

Case opinions
- Majority: Brennan, joined by Rehnquist, White, Marshall, Blackmun, Stevens, Kennedy
- Concurrence: O'Connor, joined by Scalia

Preseault v. Interstate Commerce Commission, 494 U.S. 1 (1990), was a case decided by the United States Supreme Court, which upheld the constitutionality of the federal railbanking program. The ruling ensured that defunct railroad lines could be converted into public recreational trails, initiating a large expansion of rail trails across the United States. The case established that if property owners believe the conversion of a rail corridor constitutes a taking of their property, their legal remedy is to sue the federal government for just compensation under the Tucker Act.

This Supreme Court ruling directly led to a subsequent case, Preseault v. United States (1996), in which the Court of Appeals for the Federal Circuit defined the property law mechanics determining when compensation is owed to underlying landowners.

== Background ==
Beginning in the 1980s, the US government utilized the railbanking program under the National Trails System Act to repurpose defunct and uneconomical railroad lines. The policy was designed to preserve these corridors and promote recreation by converting them into public rail trails for bicycling and hiking.

J. Paul and Patricia Preseault owned property in Vermont that was subject to a railroad right-of-way easement. Train operations on the Island Line of the Rutland Railroad ended in 1970, and the physical tracks and equipment were dismantled in 1975. The Preseaults had purchased the property aware of the historical easement, but assumed it had been extinguished when the tracks were removed.

However, the physical removal of tracks does not automatically constitute a legal abandonment under federal law. Because the railroad never requested or received a formal abandonment order from the Interstate Commerce Commission (ICC), the federal government retained jurisdiction over the corridor. Upon the initiation of the railbanking program, the ICC transferred the right-of-way to the State of Vermont and the City of Burlington. Operating under the belief that the historical easement permitted this new public use, the city constructed the Burlington Bike Path (now part of the Island Line Trail) across the Preseaults' property.

The Preseaults filed a complaint with the ICC arguing that they had not consented to the trail and had not received compensation. The ICC rejected this complaint, determining the historical easement allowed for the recreational trail.

== The Supreme Court Decision (1990) ==
The Preseaults challenged the federal railbanking statute in federal court, arguing that it permitted the unconstitutional taking of private property. The case eventually reached the United States Supreme Court.

The Supreme Court unanimously upheld the constitutionality of the railbanking program. However, the Court ruled that if a property owner believed their specific property had been subjected to an unconstitutional "taking," their proper legal remedy was to sue the federal government for compensation in the United States Court of Federal Claims under the Tucker Act.

== Impact on the Rail-Trail Movement ==
The Supreme Court's validation of the program greatly expanded the use of railbanking in the United States.

- Prior to the 1990 ruling, only 10 railbanking agreements had been successfully reached.
- Following the decision, there were four dozen more railbanking agreements in 1991. About one hundred more agreements were reached in 1992. Four score more agreements were reached in 1993.
- By the year 2026, more than 4,400 miles of rail trails were created using the railbanking program.

== Subsequent Litigation: Preseault v. United States (1996) ==
Preseault v. United States
- Court: United States Court of Appeals for the Federal Circuit
- Full case name: J. Paul Preseault and Patricia Preseault, Individually and As Partners of 985 Associates, Ltd., A Vermont Limited Partnership v. United States, Defendant, and State of Vermont, Defendant/Cross-Appellant.
- Decided: November 5, 1996
- Citation: 100 F.3d 1525

Case history
- Prior actions: Preseault v. ICC, 494 U.S. 1 (1990)

Court membership
- Judges sitting: Plager, Newman, Mayer, Michel, Lourie, Clevenger, Rader, Schall, Bryson

Case opinions
- The conversion of a historical railroad easement into a public recreational trail under the federal railbanking statute constituted a Fifth Amendment taking of the underlying property owner's rights, requiring just compensation.
- Decision by: Plager (plurality)
- Concurrence: Schall
- Dissent: Clevenger

Keywords
- Railbanking; Eminent domain; Easement; Takings Clause

Following the Supreme Court's instruction, the Preseaults filed a new lawsuit seeking compensation under the Tucker Act, which eventually reached the Court of Appeals for the Federal Circuit.

A three-judge panel initially heard the appeal in 1995, ruling in favor of the government and affirming that no taking had occurred. Concluding that the case raised constitutional issues of exceptional importance, the full court vacated the panel's decision and reheard the case en banc. In a fractured 1996 decision featuring a plurality opinion, a concurrence, and a dissent, the deeply divided Federal Circuit reversed the lower court and ruled that a compensable taking had indeed occurred.

The court evaluated three primary property law questions to reach this conclusion:

- Nature of the Original Right: The court determined that the railroad had originally acquired an easement for railroad purposes, rather than outright ownership (fee simple absolute) of the land.
- Scope of the Easement: The court determined that a public trail for biking and hiking was a fundamentally different use than a commercial railway, meaning the new trail fell outside the scope of the original easement.
- Abandonment: The court found that even if the new trail use had fallen within the scope of the easement, the railroad had effectively abandoned the easement under state property law when it removed the tracks in 1975, regardless of whether a formal ICC order was filed under federal law.

Because the easement had been abandoned and the new recreational use exceeded the scope of the original grant, the court ruled the government's authorization of the trail constituted a taking of the Preseaults' property.

== Legacy ==
The 1996 Federal Circuit decision established that when the federal government uses the railbanking statute to convert a historical railroad easement into a public trail, it may trigger a Fifth Amendment taking if the underlying state property law dictates that the easement had either been abandoned or did not encompass recreational trail use.

While the ruling required the federal government to pay the Preseaults just compensation for their property rights, it did not shut down the trail. Because federal railbanking law supersedes state property law regarding the abandonment of the corridor itself, the Burlington Bike Path was legally permitted to remain open.

Furthermore, the compensation requirement does not apply to all railbanked rail trails. Danaya Wright, a law professor at the University of Florida, examined thousands of 19th-century source deeds and determined that 80 percent of rail corridors are owned outright in fee simple by railroads. Because these corridors are not easements, they are not subject to just compensation claims under railbanking.
