= Michael C. Casey =

American national security official

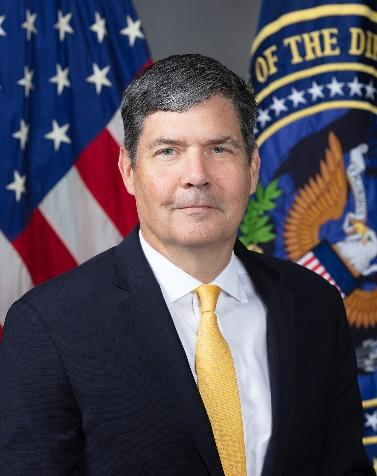

Director of the National Counterintelligence and Security Center
- In office September 18, 2023 – January 20, 2025
- President: Joe Biden
- Preceded by: William Evanina; Michael Orlando (acting)
- Succeeded by: George Wesley Street

Personal details
- Education: University of Kentucky; Georgetown University (MA)

Michael Colin Casey is an American national security official who had served as director of the United States National Counterintelligence and Security Center (NCSC).

== Early life and education ==
Casey graduated from the University of Kentucky and Georgetown University's Walsh School of Foreign Service.

== Career ==
On June 7, 2023, Casey was nominated by President Joe Biden to serve in the role. Casey was the Staff Director for the United States Senate Select Committee on Intelligence since 2016. Prior to that, he served as a staff member on the United States House Committee on Armed Services.

On September 12, 2023, Casey was confirmed by the United States Senate as NCSC director.

Senator Mark Warner, Chairman of the Senate Select Committee on Intelligence, offered remarks after Casey's unanimous confirmation.
