= Surface Transportation Board =

Independent agency of the United States federal government

- Seal of the Surface Transportation Board

Board overview
- Formed: January 1, 1996
- Preceding board: Interstate Commerce Commission
- Jurisdiction: United States government
- Headquarters: Washington, D.C.
- Board executive: Patrick Fuchs, Chairman
- Parent department: Independent agency
- Key document: Interstate Commerce Commission Termination Act
- Website: www.stb.gov

The Surface Transportation Board (STB) of the United States is an independent federal agency that serves as an adjudicatory board. The board was created in 1996 following the abolition of the Interstate Commerce Commission (ICC) and absorbed regulatory powers relevant to the railroad industry previously under the ICC's purview.

The STB has broad economic regulatory oversight of railroads in the United States, including matters related to the construction, acquisition, abandonment of rail lines, railbanking, carrier mergers, and interchange of traffic between carriers and some passenger rail matters.

The board also has jurisdiction over the "intercity bus industry, non-energy pipelines, household goods carriers’ tariffs, and rate regulation of non-contiguous domestic water transportation".

The board comprises five members nominated by the president, each subject to Senate confirmation. Since 2025, Republican Patrick Fuchs has served as chair of the STB, succeeding Democrat Robert E. Primus.

== History ==
The STB was established on January 1, 1996 to assume some of the regulatory functions that had been administered by the Interstate Commerce Commission when the ICC was abolished. Other ICC regulatory functions were either eliminated or transferred to the Federal Motor Carrier Safety Administration or the Bureau of Transportation Statistics within the Department of Transportation.

Since its founding, various legislation pertaining to the STB's functions has been introduced in Congress. In 2015, the Surface Transportation Board Reauthorization Act was passed, which expanded the Board from three to five members. The passage of the legislation transformed the STB, which had been "administratively aligned" with the Department of Transportation while still decisionally independent, into an entirely independent federal agency.

In response to concerns regarding increasing corporate concentration in the rail industry, the STB has considered proposals to encourage rail competition. In 2016, a proposal was made to establish "reciprocal switching rules" to require railroads to create arrangements where shippers could access competing carriers instead of other options. In 2022, Chairman Oberman supported reciprocal switching rules, arguing they would address shippers' complaints and encourage industry competition.

== Agency authority ==
The STB has the authority to regulate rates, service, construction, acquisition, railbanking and abandonment of rail lines, carrier mergers, and traffic interchanges.

The STB also has oversight of pipeline carriers, intercity bus carriers, moving van companies, trucking companies involved in collective activities, and water carriers engaged in non-contiguous domestic trade. The Board has broad discretion, through its exemption authority from federal, state, and local laws, to implement transportation regulation.

=== Performance and policy goals ===
The Board provides a forum for resolving surface transportation disputes and other matters within its jurisdiction. It has the authority to limit or remove regulatory requirements where appropriate.

== Organizational structure and members ==
The Board comprises five members nominated by the President and confirmed by the Senate for five-year terms. The President designates the Board's chairman from among the members. As its chief executive, the chairman coordinates and organizes the agency's work and acts as its representative in legislative matters and relations with other governmental bodies.

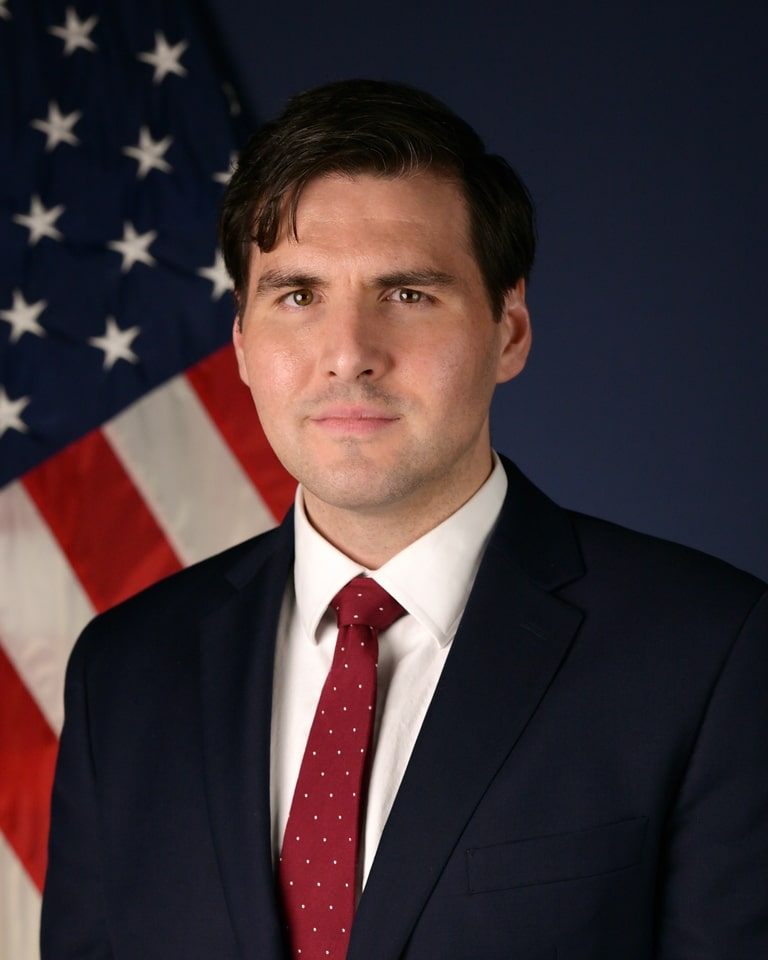
Patrick Fuchs, chairman of the Surface Transportation Board since 2025

The current chairman is Republican Patrick Fuchs, who was nominated to the STB by President Donald Trump in 2018, confirmed by the Senate, and sworn in January 2019. Fuchs was chosen by President Donald Trump to serve as chairman of the STB on January 20, 2025, succeeding Robert E. Primus, who had been Chairman between May 2024 and January 2025.

The vice chairman represents the Board and assumes the chairman's duties as appropriate. Additionally, the vice chairman oversees matters involving the admission, discipline, and disbarment of non-attorney Board practitioners. The current vice chairman is Michelle A. Schultz.

Assisting the Board in carrying out its responsibilities is a staff of 117 (FY2018) with experience in economics, law, accounting, transportation analysis, finance, and administration.

=== Current board members ===
The board members as of August 7, 2026 are:

Position	Name	Party	Sworn in	Term expires
Chair	Patrick Fuchs	Republican	January 17, 2019	January 14, 2029
Vice Chair	Michelle A. Schultz	Republican	January 11, 2021	November 30, 2030
Member	Karen Hedlund	Democratic	January 3, 2022	December 31, 2030
Member	Richard Kloster	Republican	June 5, 2026	December 31, 2028
Member	Vacant			

=== Past members ===
- Linda J. Morgan April 28, 1994 – December 31, 2003
- Gus A. Owen 1995 – 1998
- J.J. Simmons III January 1, 1996 – end of 1996
- William Clyburn, Jr. 1998 – 2001
- Wayne Burkes February 22, 1999 – December 31, 2002
- Roger Nober 2002 – January 4, 2006
- Francis P. Mulvey 2004 – January 3, 2013
- W. Douglas Buttrey May 28, 2004 – March 13, 2009
- Charles D. Nottingham August 2006 – 2011
- Daniel R. Elliott III 2009 – 2017
- Ann D. Begeman May 2, 2011 – December 17, 2021
- Deb Miller April 28, 2014 – January 1, 2019
- Martin J. Oberman January 22, 2019 – May 10, 2024
- Robert E. Primus January 7, 2021 – August 27, 2025

== Offices ==
=== Office of Public Assistance, Governmental Affairs, and Compliance ===
The Office of Public Assistance, Governmental Affairs, and Compliance is the agency's principal point of contact with Congress, state and local governments, the media, industry stakeholders, and the general public. This office includes the Rail Customer and Public Assistance Program, where Board staff solves problems ranging from a simple answer to a telephone inquiry to lengthy informal dispute resolution efforts between railroads and shippers.

=== Office of Economics ===
The Office of Economics analyzes rate cases, conducts economic and financial analyses of the railroad industry, and audits Class I railroads.

=== Office of Environmental Analysis ===
The Office of Environmental Analysis is responsible for undertaking environmental reviews of proposed STB actions in accordance with the National Environmental Policy Act and other environmental laws and making environmental recommendations to the STB.

=== Office of the Managing Director ===
The Office of the Managing Director handles administrative matters such as personnel, budget, and information technology.

=== Office of Proceedings ===
The Office of Proceedings (OP) is primarily responsible for developing the public record in formal cases (or proceedings) filed with the STB, making recommendations regarding the resolution of issues presented in those cases, and preparing the decisions issued by the Board.

The Office of Proceedings is a legal office consisting almost entirely of attorneys and paralegal specialists responsible for the majority of the cases at the STB. The office applies the Interstate Commerce Act, as amended by the ICC Termination Act of 1995, as well as the Board's regulations. In carrying out its responsibilities, the Office of Proceedings obtains and applies any necessary input from economic, financial, operational, environmental, and other legal staff experts throughout the agency.

The Office of Proceedings includes a clearance unit responsible for tabulating votes on STB cases and recording the official outcome of those votes and a recordations unit that enters data about a filing's primary and secondary documents into the STB Recordations database, which is accessible to the public on the STB web site.

=== Office of General Counsel ===
The Office of the General Counsel (OGC) responds to questions on various legal issues. However, its primary mission is to defend the STB's decisions in court and assess the defensibility of agency decisions that might be challenged in court. Unlike most Federal agencies, the STB has independent litigating authority (49 U.S.C. § 703(d)). Under the Hobbs Act, when an STB order or decision is challenged in the U.S. Court of Appeals, both the STB (represented by the agency's attorneys) and the United States (represented by U.S. Department of Justice (DOJ) attorneys) must be named as "respondents" (defendants), and both have authority to appear in court in such cases. STB and DOJ attorneys jointly defend the agency's decisions, with the STB's attorneys preparing written briefs (in consultation with DOJ attorneys) and presenting oral arguments on behalf of the Federal Government.

In performing defensibility assessments, OGC attorneys meet with other STB staff to discuss cases before draft decisions are prepared. Defensibility assessments are crucial to issuing sound choices that are less likely to be challenged and, if challenged, are more likely to be upheld.

=== Office of Passenger Rail (OPR) ===
The Office of Passenger Rail supports the Board in its efforts to meet its responsibilities under the Passenger Rail Investment and Improvement Act of 2008. The Office provides the Board with expertise related to passenger rail that includes legal and policy guidance, engineering, data analysis, and rail operations.
