= Deb Miller =

American politician (born 1956)

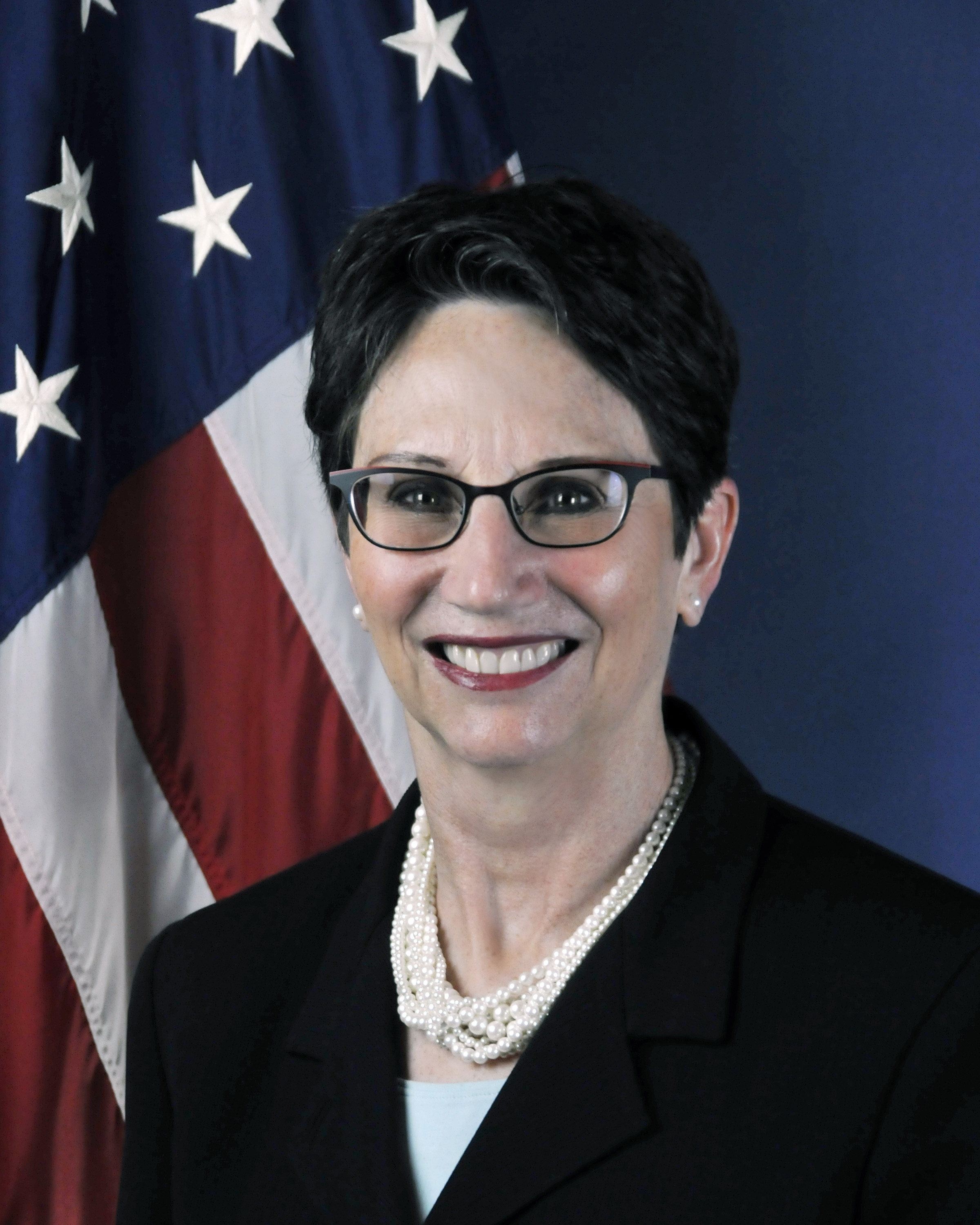

Member of the Surface Transportation Board
- In office April 28, 2014 – January 1, 2019
- President: Barack Obama; Donald Trump
- Preceded by: Francis P. Mulvey
- Succeeded by: Robert E. Primus

Kansas Secretary of Transportation
- In office January 13, 2003 – December 16, 2011
- Governor: Kathleen Sebelius; Mark Parkinson; Sam Brownback
- Preceded by: E. Dean Carlson
- Succeeded by: Barb Rankin (acting)

Personal details
- Born: December 25, 1956 (age 69) Parsons, Kansas
- Party: Democratic
- Spouse: Jim McLean
- Education: Kansas State University (B.S.)

Debra L. "Deb" Miller was the vice chair of the Surface Transportation Board. She previously served as the Kansas Secretary of Transportation under three successive Governors of Kansas between 2003 and 2011. She is Kansas' first female and longest-serving secretary of transportation.

After her tenure, she joined transportation policy firm Cambridge Systematics, Inc. as a senior consultant in January 2012. She was nominated to the Surface Transportation Board by President Barack Obama on September 25, 2013, and confirmed by the United States Senate on April 9, 2014. Her term expired on December 31, 2017.

== Early life and career ==
Miller was born on December 25, 1956, in Parsons, Kansas. She graduated magna cum laude from Kansas State University in 1976 with a Bachelor of Science degree in sociology.

Prior to her appointment as secretary, she was a consultant at HNTB. In addition, she served as director of KDOT's Division of Planning and Development, as a special assistant to the Secretary of Transportation, and as a policy advisor to the Governor of Kansas.

== Kansas Secretary of Transportation ==
Miller was appointed by Governor Kathleen Sebelius, as the first woman to lead KDOT and its more than 3,200 employees. During her tenure, Kansas passed T‑WORKS, an $8 billion, 10-year transportation program meant to create jobs throughout Kansas by funding highway preservation and capacity improvements, continuing the focus on safety improvements, and increasing investments in aviation, rail, and public transportation.

Governor Sam Brownback retained Miller as Secretary of Transportation in his administration until her departure in 2011.

== Surface Transportation Board ==
On September 25, 2013, President Barack Obama nominated Miller to fill the vacancy of Francis P. Mulvey on the Surface Transportation Board, an agency tasked with resolving railroad rate and service disputes. She was confirmed by the United States Senate on April 9, 2014. Miller was sworn in on April 28 as the 12th member of the board since its creation in 1996. From January 7, 2016, she served as vice chair of the board. Her term expired on December 31, 2017.

Political offices
| Preceded by E. Dean Carlson | Kansas Secretary of Transportation; 2003–2011 | Succeeded by Barb Rankin (acting) |
