= ICC Termination Act of 1995 =

- Long title: To abolish the Interstate Commerce Commission, to amend subtitle IV of title 49, United States Code, to reform economic regulation of transportation, and for other purposes.
- Enacted by: the 104th United States Congress
- Effective: December 29, 1995

Citations
- Public law: Pub. L. 104–88 (text) (PDF)
- Statutes at Large: 109 Stat. 183

Codification
- Titles amended: 49 U.S.C.: Transportation

Legislative history
- Introduced in the House by Bud Shuster (R‑PA 9th) on October 26, 1995; Committee consideration by House Transportation and Infrastructure; Passed the House on November 14, 1995 (417-8); Passed the Senate on November 28, 1995 (voice vote); Reported by the joint conference committee on December 18, 1995; agreed to by the Senate on December 21, 1995 (voice vote) and by the House on December 22, 1995 (without objection); Signed into law by President Bill Clinton on December 29, 1995

The ICC Termination Act of 1995 is a United States federal law enacted in 1995 that abolished the Interstate Commerce Commission and simultaneously created its successor agency, the Surface Transportation Board.

On December 1, 2020, Oklahoma City federal judge Charles B. Goodwin referred to this Act when he declared unconstitutional a 2019 State of Oklahoma law preventing trains from blocking streets for longer than 10 minutes; declaring, in part:

. . . a state or local government can address grade-level railroad crossing issues in a manner that does not run afoul of federal law . . . But a statute that tells railroad companies how long they may stop their trains — for whatever ends — intrudes on the territory reserved to the ICCTA.
