= William Evanina =

American national security official (born 1967)

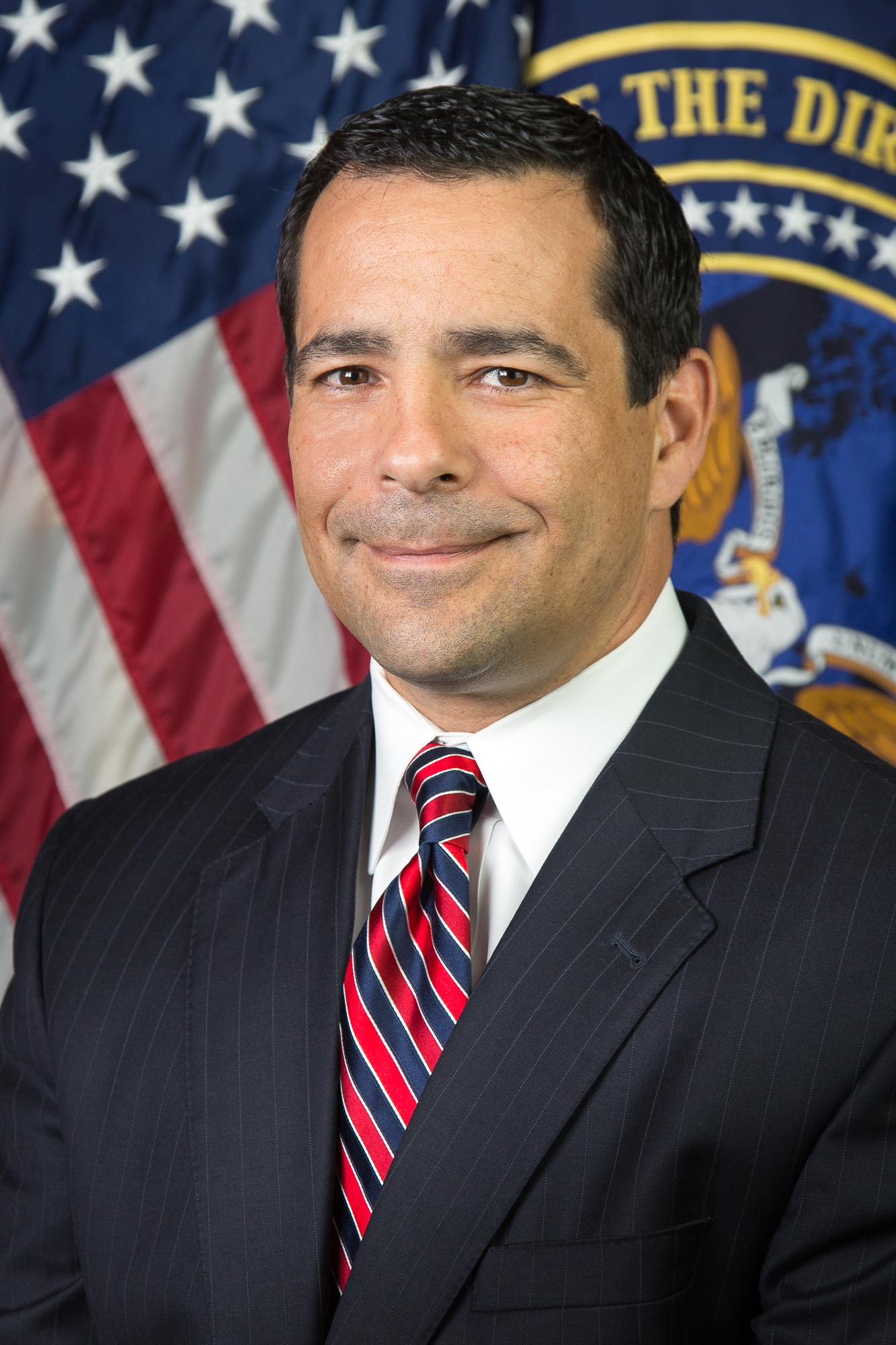
- Official portrait, 2014

Director of the National Counterintelligence and Security Center
- In office June 2, 2014 – January 20, 2021
- President: Barack Obama; Donald Trump
- Preceded by: Bear Bryant (National Counterintelligence Executive)
- Succeeded by: Michael Orlando (acting); Michael C. Casey

Personal details
- Born: 1967 (age 57–58); Peckville, Pennsylvania, U.S.
- Education: Wilkes University (BPA); Arcadia University (MA)

William R. Evanina (born 1967) is an American national security official who served as director of the United States National Counterintelligence and Security Center (NCSC) until his January 2021 resignation. As director of the NCSC he was the head of national counterintelligence for the U.S. Government. Evanina previously served as director of the Office of the national counterintelligence executive (ONCIX) before it transitioned into the NCSC. Prior to his service as national counterintelligence executive, he was the chief of the Counterespionage Group for the Central Intelligence Agency. He gained his initial law enforcement experience as a special agent for the Federal Bureau of Investigation.

== Early life and education ==
Evanina was born to John and Barbara Evanina in Peckville, a suburb of Scranton, Pennsylvania, where he grew up. His father was a machinist for Lockheed Martin and a professional musician, founder of The Pennsylvania Merry Makers, a well-known polka band. Evanina attended Valley View High School, where he played football, basketball, and baseball followed by a stint at Keystone College, where he continued to play baseball. He then transferred to nearby Wilkes University and in 1989 received a Bachelor of Arts degree in public administration, magna cum laude. While with the FBI he completed a master's degree in Educational Leadership at Arcadia University in 2008.

== Career ==
After college Evanina went to work for the General Services Administration, where he was a project manager in the new construction division. In 1996 he joined the Federal Bureau of Investigation where as a special agent he served in the violent crimes unit, the organized crime unit, and the Bank Robberies and Counterterrorism divisions. He also later served in the FBI's National Security Branch and Counterintelligence Division. He became a certified SWAT team member as well as a certified sniper. During this time he was involved with the investigation into the hijacking of United Airlines Flight 93 on September 11, 2001, the mail-distributed anthrax attacks also in 2001, and the Daniel Pearl kidnapping.

In June 2004, he was appointed as a Supervisory Special Agent in the new Joint Terrorism Task Force. While there, following a tipoff from Customs, he led the investigation into the activities of an FBI intelligence analyst at Fort Monmouth, New Jersey, who was leaking classified information to parties in the Philippines. Evanina's work led to the conviction of Leandro Aragoncillo for espionage, in appreciation of which Evanina received the FBI Director's Award for Excellence. In January 2006 he was appointed as Senior Supervisory Resident Agent (SSRA) heading the FBI's New Jersey office in Trenton. In March 2009, he was assigned to the Washington office, and worked in the FBI's National Security Branch, where he led both counterintelligence and counterterrorism operations.

In September 2013, Evanina was put in charge of the joint FBI and CIA Counterintelligence Division/ Counterespionage Group, where he coordinated personnel from multiple intelligence agencies in countering foreign espionage. In June 2014, he was appointed by James R. Clapper to head the office of the National Counterintelligence Executive, replacing Frank Montoya.

After the firing of James Comey in May 2017, Evanina was under final consideration as interim director of the FBI; instead Andrew G. McCabe remained as acting director until the appointment of Christopher A. Wray in August 2017. In February 2018, President Trump formally nominated Evanina to the directorship of the National Counterintelligence and Security Center, as Congress had made the position subject to Senate confirmation as of 2015. On May 6, 2020, the United States Senate confirmed his nomination by a 84–7 vote.

On January 21, 2021, Evanina announced his resignation, leaving his deputy, Michael Orlando, as the acting director. In April 2021 Evanina accepted a position on the Advisory Board of Peraton, a national security technology company. That same year he founded the Evanina Group, LLC, advising chief executive officers and boards of directors on strategic corporate risk, where, as of 2025, he remains the CEO.
