= Island Line Trail =

Rail trail in Vermont, United States

Coordinates: 44.5506°N 73.2955°W

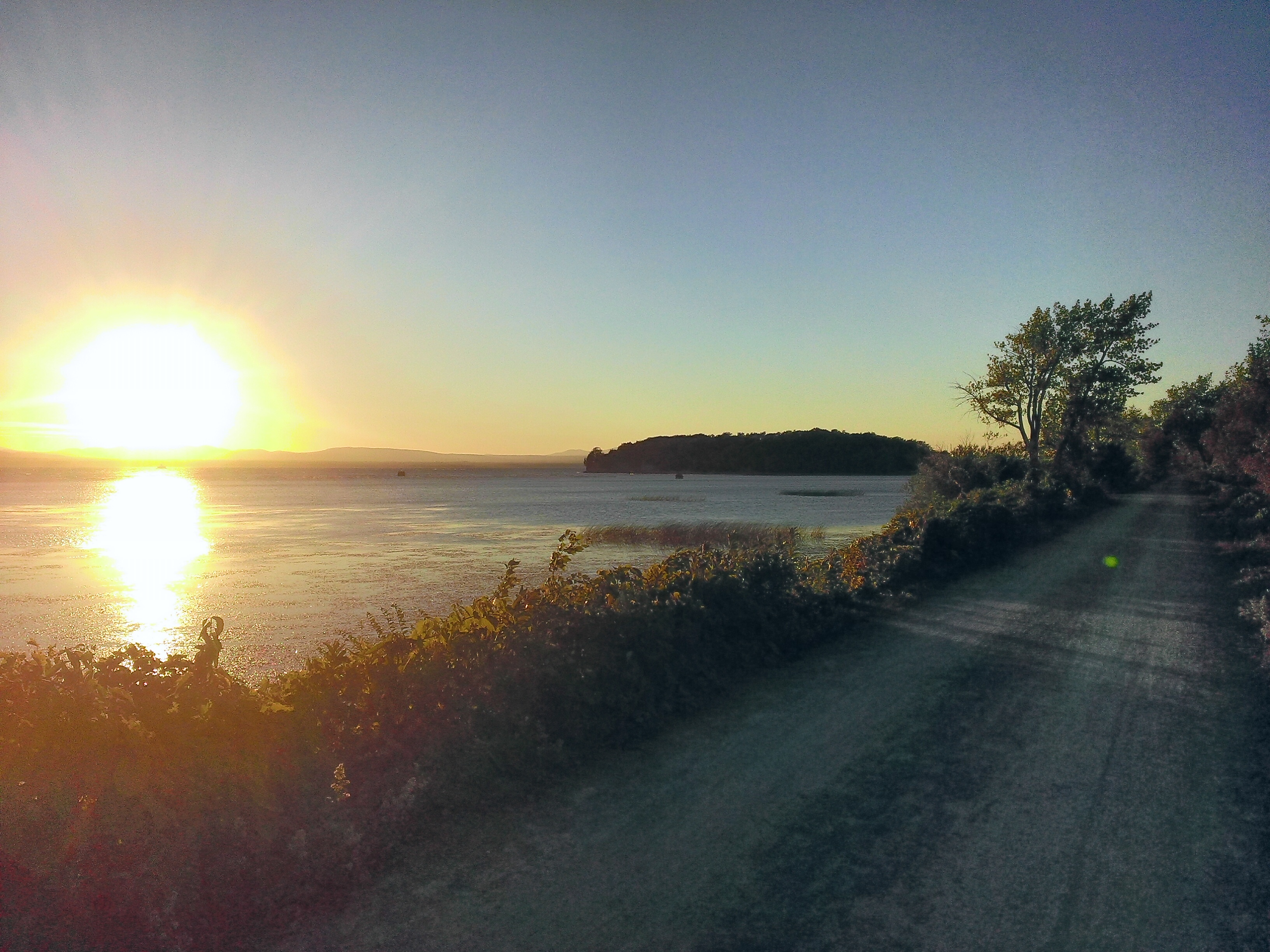
- Facing north on the Island Line Trail
- Length: 14 miles (23 km)
- Location: Vermont
- Use: Cycling, walking
- Website: www.localmotion.org/island_line_trail_map

The Island Line Trail, also known as the Island Line Rail Trail or Colchester Causeway, is a 14.4-mile (23.2 km) rail trail located in northwest Vermont. It starts near Oakledge Park (Burlington) and comprises the Burlington Bike Path (Burlington), Airport Park and Causeway Park (Colchester), and the Allen Point Access Area (South Hero). The causeway portion of the trail extends out into Lake Champlain. The trail is relatively flat, and its surfaces include a mix of paved/cement (Oakledge Park and Burlington Bike Path), gravel (the stretch by the Colchester parks), and gravel/crushed stone (the Causeway). The trail follows the route of the Island Line railroad, built by the Rutland Railroad in 1901.

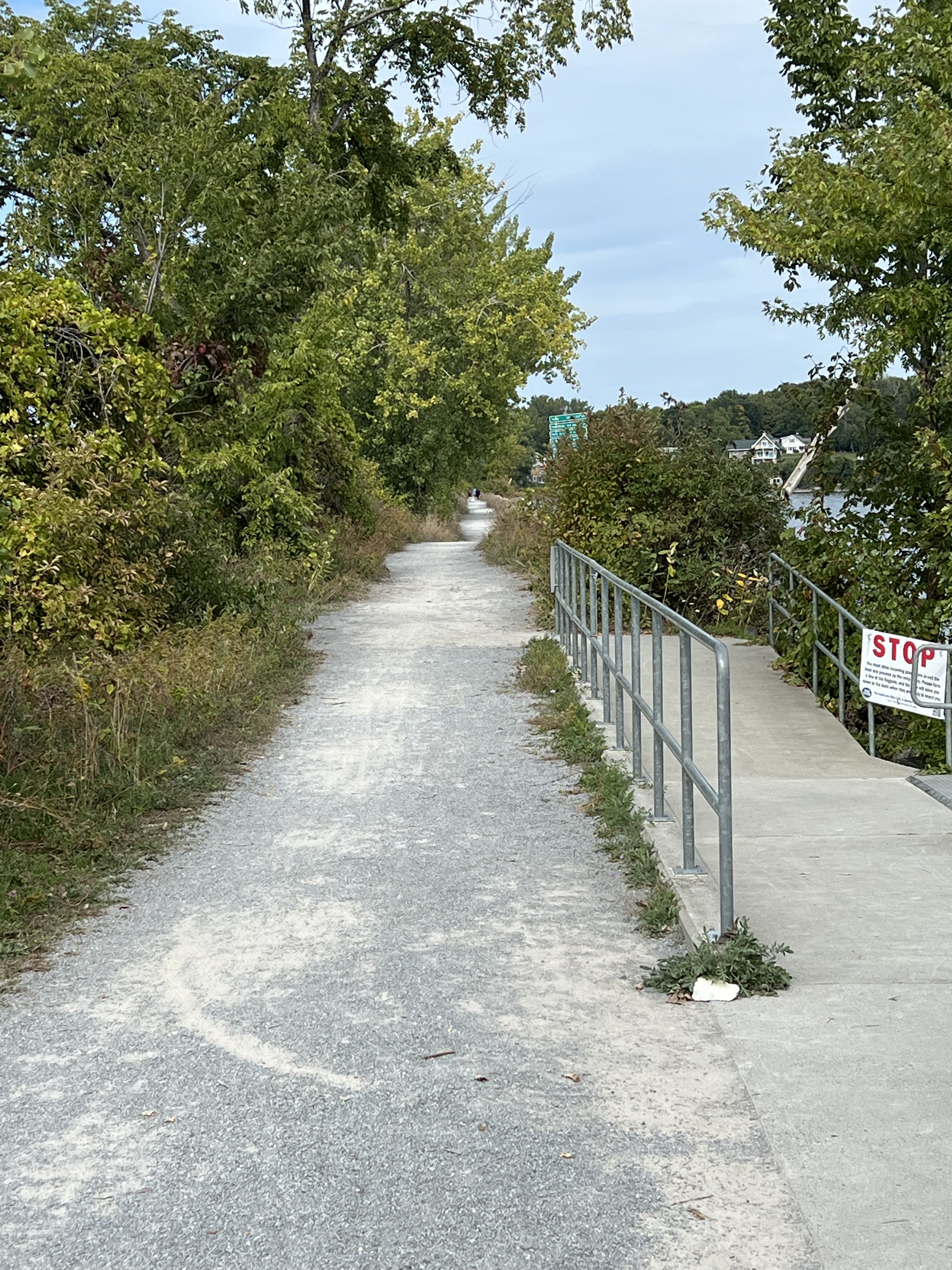
The trail on the Colchester Causeway at the northern bicycle ferry dock

There is a 200-foot (61 m) gap in the causeway that allows boat traffic to cross. A donation-based ferry operates in the summer months carrying trail users over the gap.

== History ==
Passenger service on the Rutland's Island Line (and on the entire Rutland Railroad system) ended after a strike by employees in late June 1953. A second set of strikes, in 1960 and 1961, brought about the complete closure of the Rutland Railroad. The final trains ran on September 25, 1961. In 1963, the state of Vermont purchased the abandoned, but not torn-up, Rutland Railroad lines from Burlington to Rutland, North Bennington, Hoosick Junction, and Bellows Falls, leasing them to the Vermont Railway and the Green Mountain Railroad to resume freight service, but the state chose not to acquire and reopen the Island Line.

There was little on-line traffic left on that portion of the route, and freight for Canada could be routed from Burlington north to Montreal over the somewhat-longer Central Vermont Railway through St. Albans, Vermont. After several years of inactivity, restoring service on the Island Line would have required extensive rebuilding, and renovations of the three swing bridges on the line over various bays of Lake Champlain. Ultimately, all of the swing bridges on the route were removed, but the roadbed on the causeway across the lake survived, as it was heavily built with much use of granite and marble tailings. The alignment along the shores of Lake Champlain from Burlington Union Station north to the causeway was converted to form the Burlington Bike Path, and later took the Island Line name when the causeway was reopened, with a seasonal bike-ferry replacing the swing bridge in the northern portion of the causeway alignment. Due to a 200-foot (61 m) gap in the causeway, the organization Local Motion operates the Island Line Bike Ferry to shuttle cyclists across the gap.

In the United States, railbanking was established in 1983 as an amendment to Section 8(d) of the National Trails System Act, also known as the Rails-to-Trails Act. What became the Island Line Trail was created as only the 2nd railbanking agreement in the country, in January 1987. This began a property ownership dispute, and in 1990, the United States Supreme Court upheld the constitutionality of railbanking in Preseault v. Interstate Commerce Commission. This success at the Supreme Court greatly expanded the use of railbanking in the United States, with four dozen more in 1991, about one hundred more in 1992, and four score more in 1993.

=== Recent developments ===
In May 2019, the Island Line Trail was damaged by a period of 70 mile-per-hour winds and 7-foot waves. The trail subsequently received nearly $2 million in upgrades and repairs between September 2019 and May 2020, during which time the trail was closed to public use.

A helicopter crashed into the causeway on July 30, 2021, closing the trail for three hours. The lone pilot escaped the wreckage and was taken to UVM Medical Center with minor to moderate injuries.
