= Aaron Szabo =

American government official

Aaron Szabo is an American lawyer, lobbyist, and government official who has served as assistant administrator of the United States Environmental Protection Agency for air and radiation since August 25, 2025, a position to which he was appointed by President Donald Trump. In that post he directs the EPA Office of Air and Radiation. In the Trump administration, Szabo has been part of efforts to deregulate environmental and health regulations, saying that the deregulatory measures would "reduce red tape and bring common sense back to rulemaking."

== Career ==
Szabo held environmental posts in the first Trump administration as senior counsel at the White House Council on Environmental Quality, and in policy positions at the Office of Management and Budget and Nuclear Regulatory Commission. After the end of the first Trump administration he worked at the law firm of Faegre Drinker.

Before joining the EPA under the second Trump administration, worked for the lobbying firm CGCN Group, whose clients included the American Fuel and Petrochemical Manufacturers. American Fuel and Petrochemical Manufacturers opposes stricter standards for particulate pollution. Shortly after joining the EPA, Szabo was involving in weakening regulation of particulate pollution. Szabo also worked for the America First Policy Institute. Szabo was thanked by name in the EPA chapter of Project 2025. Szabo said that he gave the Project 2025 authors "general advice and thoughts" on the Clean Air Act.

Metadata shows that Szabo was the author of a letter to the EPA on behalf of the American Exploration and Production Council, objecting to controls on methane emissions. Shortly after taking a position at the EPA, Szabo met with representatives from the oil and chemical industries to discuss a petition to “reconsider” the methane rules.

During Szabo's Senate confirmation hearing, he said he had a personal stake in clean air because he had cystic fibrosis. He was confirmed on party lines. Democrats criticized Szabo's appointment to the EPA, pointing to his lobbying past for oil and chemical industries. Senator Sheldon Whitehouse said, "Now he can do Big Oil’s dirty work from inside the EPA."

On July 7, 2026, The New York Times reported that Szabo would be leaving the Trump administration.
