= National Counterintelligence and Security Center =

US federal agency

- Seal of the National Counterintelligence and Security Center

Agency overview
- Formed: January 5, 2001
- Preceding agencies: National Counterintelligence Center; Office of the National Counterintelligence Executive
- Jurisdiction: Counterintelligence on behalf of the federal government of the United States
- Agency executive: George Wesley Street, Director
- Parent department: Director of National Intelligence

The National Counterintelligence and Security Center (NCSC) leads national counterintelligence (CI) for the United States federal government. It is a mission center within the Office of the Director of National Intelligence (ODNI).

== History ==
Seal of the preceding agency, the Office of the National Counterintelligence Executive

The position of National Counterintelligence Executive (NCIX) and its supporting office, the Office of the National Counterintelligence Executive (ONCIX), were established on January 5, 2001, by a presidential directive (PDD-75) from then-President Bill Clinton; the directive also established the National Counterintelligence (CI) Board of Directors and National CI Policy Board (NCIPB) to advise the NCIX. ONCIX replaced the National Counterintelligence Center, which was created in 1994 in response to the arrest of CIA mole Aldrich Ames. These new counterintelligence institutions were later codified by the Counterintelligence Enhancement Act of 2002.

The 2004 Intelligence Reform and Terrorism Prevention Act (IRTPA), passed to implement many of the recommendations of the 9/11 Commission, placed the NCIX and ONCIX, which coordinated Intelligence Community (IC) counterintelligence, inside the new Office of the Director of National Intelligence (ODNI), responsible for coordinating all IC activities.

In November 2014, the Director of National Intelligence established NCSC by combining ONCIX with the Center for Security Evaluation, the Special Security Center, and the National Insider Threat Task Force, to effectively integrate and align counterintelligence and security mission areas under a single organization. With this reorganization, ONCIX ceased to exist as a separate organization. The National Counterintelligence Executive (NCIX) became the Director of the new NCSC.

== Activities ==
The NCSC facilitates and enhances US counterintelligence efforts and awareness by enabling the CI community to better identify, assess, prioritize and counter intelligence threats from foreign powers, terrorist groups, and other non-state entities; it ensures that the CI community acts efficiently and effectively; and provides for the integration of all US counterintelligence activities. Its official mission is to:

- exploit and defeat adversarial intelligence activities directed against US interests
- protect the integrity of the US intelligence system
- provide incisive, actionable intelligence to decision-makers at all levels
- protect vital national assets from adversarial intelligence activities
- neutralize and exploit adversarial intelligence activities targeting the armed forces

The NCSC Director chairs the National Counterintelligence Policy Board, the principal interagency mechanism for developing national CI policies and procedures, and directs the National Counterintelligence and Security Center. The Board consists of members from the Department of Justice, (which includes the FBI), Department of Defense (including the Joint Chiefs of Staff), Department of State, Department of Energy, and the CIA. The Board may also include appointed additional members from "any other department, agency, or element of the United States Government".

While NCSC does not distribute warnings of potential threats to the private sector, it works closely with the FBI's Awareness of National Security Issues and Response (ANSIR) program, with the State Department's Overseas Security Advisory Council (OSAC), as well as with the Central Intelligence Agency (CIA) to ensure that such warnings are timely made. The Office of Counterintelligence of the National Geospatial-Intelligence Agency maintains a full-time presence within NCSC.

== Leadership ==
On August 7, 2006, Director of National Intelligence John D. Negroponte appointed Joel F. Brenner to serve as National Counterintelligence Executive and Mission Manager for Counterintelligence.

On September 21, 2009, Robert "Bear" Bryant was appointed as the National Counterintelligence Executive.

In May 2014, DNI James R. Clapper appointed William Evanina, a former FBI special agent with a counterterrorism specialty, as the new National Counterintelligence Executive.

In 2015, Congress made the position subject to the Appointments Clause, making it subject to Senate confirmation, and in 2018 President Trump formally appointed William Evanina to the position of Director of the National Counterintelligence and Security Center.

In January 2021, deputy director Michael Orlando became the acting director.

In September 2023, Michael C. Casey was sworn in as NCSC director.

In January 2025, Mark Frownfelter was named the acting director.

On September 19th, 2025, George Wesley Street assumed the position of the NCSC director.

== See also ==
- Title 32 of the Code of Federal Regulations
- National Counterproliferation Center (NCPC)
- National Counterterrorism Center (NCTC)
