= George Wesley Street =

American national security official

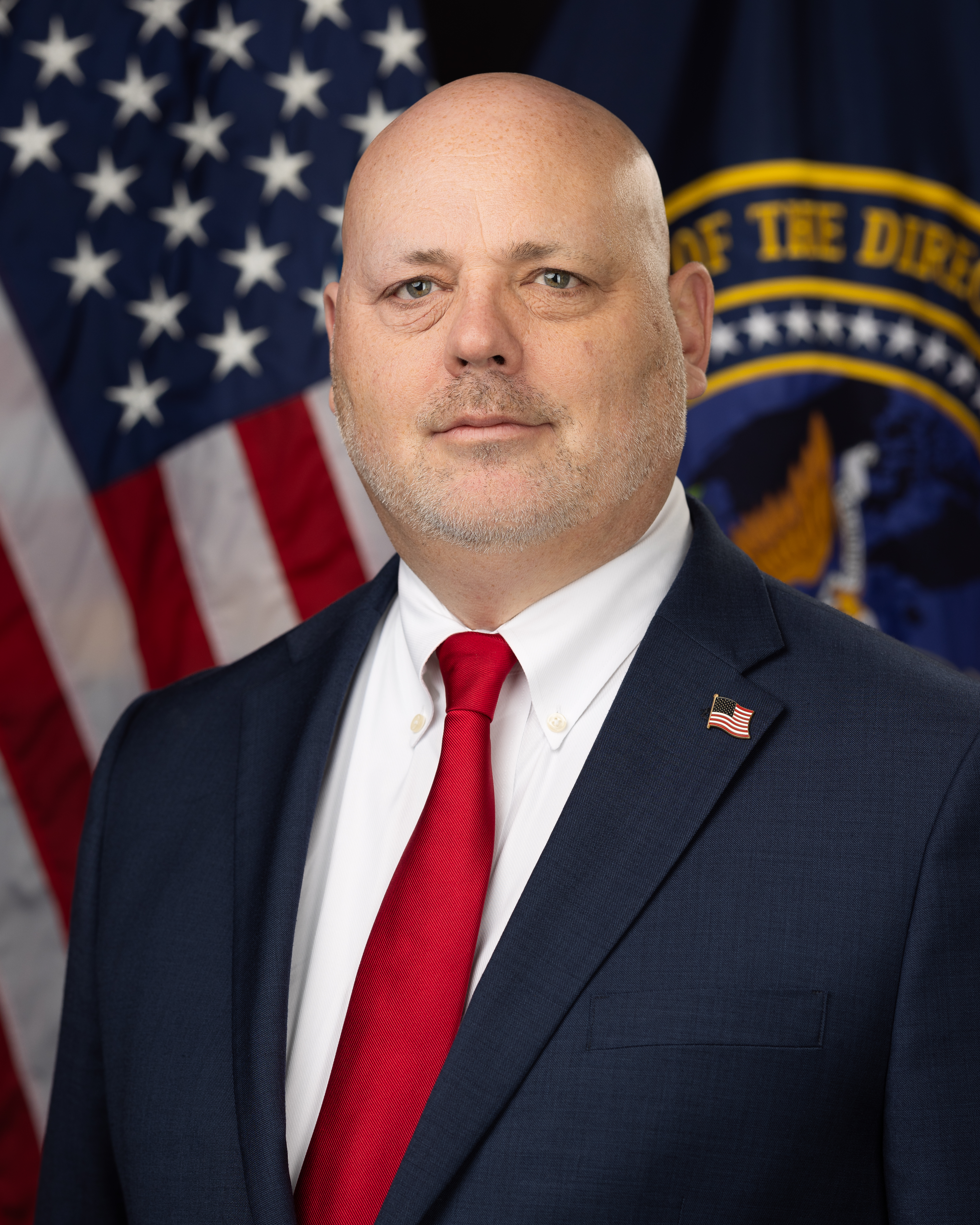
- Official portrait, 2025

Director of the National Counterintelligence and Security Center
- Incumbent
- Assumed office September 19, 2025
- President: Donald Trump
- Preceded by: Michael C. Casey

Personal details
- Born: Massachusetts, U.S.
- Education: Excelsior College

Military service
- Branch/service: United States Army

George Wesley Street is an American public servant and the director of the Director of the National Counterintelligence and Security Center (NCSC).

== Early life and education ==
Street was born in Massachusetts. He attended Excelsior College.

== Career ==
Street served as a U.S. Army Soldier and Army Civilian Counterintelligence Special Agent.

President Donald Trump nominated Street to be Director of the NCSC in March 2025. In his confirmation hearing and subsequent responses to the committee, Street highlighted interagency coordination and streamlining counterintelligence functions across the U.S. government. He also noted no political affiliations or contributions. The Senate confirmed Street's nomination in September 2025.
