= Michelle A. Schultz =

American attorney and government official

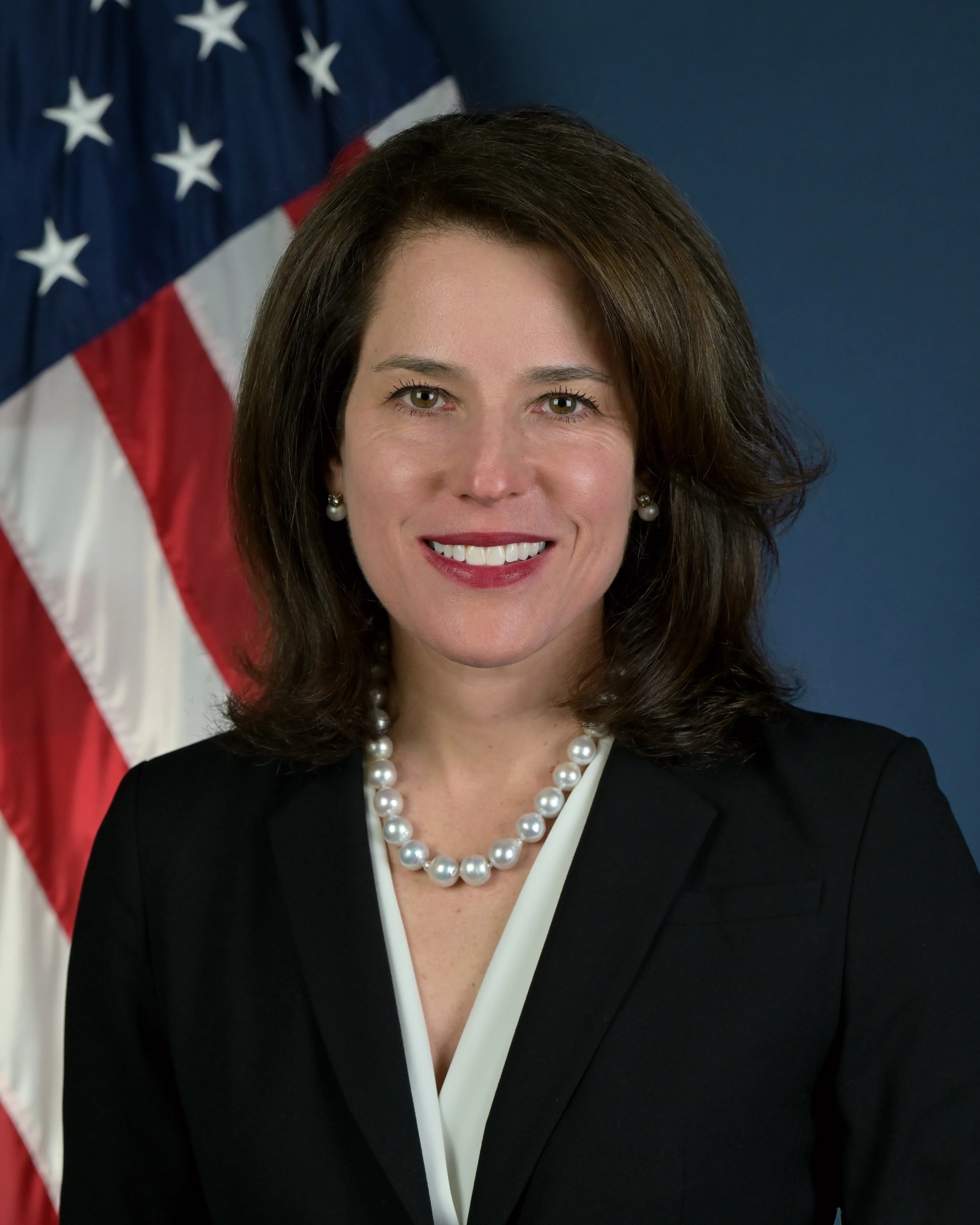

Member of the Surface Transportation Board
- Incumbent
- Assumed office January 11, 2021
- President: Donald Trump; Joe Biden; Donald Trump
- Preceded by: New position

Personal details
- Party: Republican
- Children: 2
- Education: Pennsylvania State University (B.A.); Widener University Commonwealth Law School (J.D.); University of Pennsylvania (M.G.A.)

Michelle A. Schultz is an American attorney and government official. A member of the Republican Party, she has served as a member of the Surface Transportation Board (STB) since January 11, 2021.

== Education ==
Schultz received her B.A. from Pennsylvania State University and her J.D. from the Widener University Delaware Law School. She also holds a Master of Government Administration degree from the University of Pennsylvania.

== Career ==
Before joining the STB, Schultz worked at SEPTA as the agency's director of legislative affairs and later as deputy general counsel. Earlier in her career, she was an associate at White and Williams LLP.

=== Surface Transportation Board ===
In March 2018, Schultz was nominated by President Donald Trump for a newly created position on the STB, which expanded from three to five members following the passage of the STB Reauthorization Act of 2015.

Schultz was confirmed to the position on November 18, 2020 by the United States Senate. She was sworn into office on January 11, 2021.

== Personal life ==
Schultz has two daughters from a prior marriage.
