= Arlington's Great Meadows =

American nature preserve

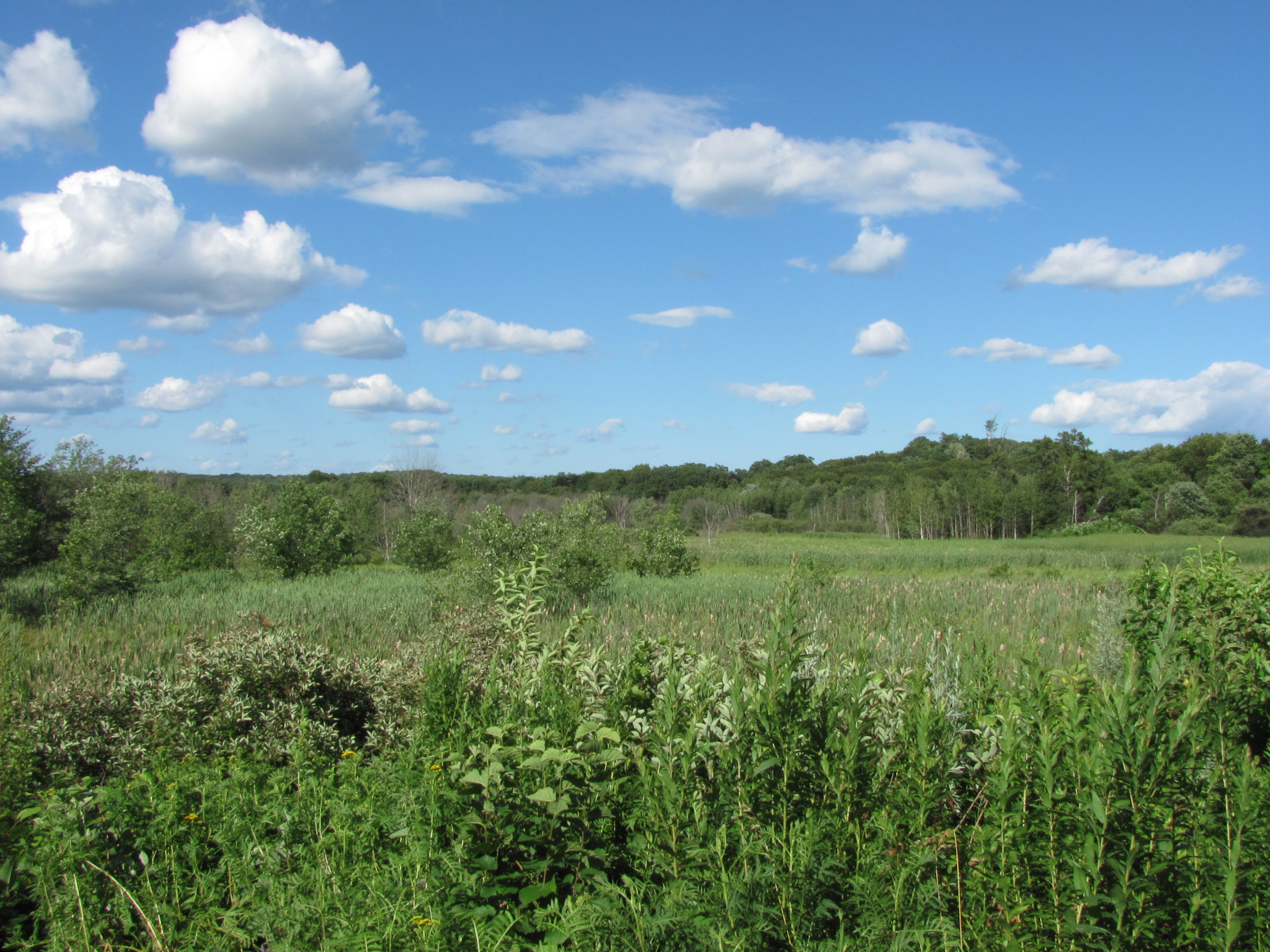
- Looking into Arlington's Great Meadows from the Minuteman Bikeway

- Location within Massachusetts
- Location: Lexington, Middlesex, Massachusetts, United States
- Coordinates: 42.4337°N 71.2008°W
- Area: 183 acres (74 ha)
- Elevation: 167 ft (51 m)
- Established: 1871
- Governing body: Town of Arlington

Arlington's Great Meadows is a 183-acre (74 ha) meadow located adjacent to the Minuteman Bikeway in Lexington, Massachusetts. The meadow was once the site of a dairy farm, which was used for livestock and crop harvesting. In 1871, Great Meadows was acquired by the town of Arlington, Massachusetts for use as a water storage area for the Mystic River. After being drained in the early 20th century, it was turned into a protected area for wildlife. It currently remains a nature preserve and serves as a popular recreational area, and an important piece in local flood control.

== History ==
Originally known as "Alewife Meadows" during colonial times, European settlers used the area to harvest oak, and harvest trees for the Medford Shipyards. Due to the soil being too soft to support buildings, the settlers left the marsh open and instead used it to graze livestock. A local family operated a dairy farm on Great Meadows until the 1860s. They also built a mill nearby the site to help build the foundations for homes. Additionally, between 1865 and 1867, the American Peat Company cut and burned peat to fuel local homes and churches.

The meadow was purchased by the town of Arlington in 1871 and primarily used as a water storage area to prevent flooding to nearby areas. Families of nearby neighborhoods used the resulting body of water for recreational activities such as boating. However, after Arlington joined the Metropolitan District Commission, making it no longer necessary to hold the water for supply, the reservoir was drained, in 1902, leaving it as a wet meadow. For much of the 20th century, the meadow served as a habitat for a wide variety of local wildlife.

Since the opening of the adjacent Minuteman Bikeway in 1992, it has become a popular recreational area for residents of Arlington and Lexington. As a result, dirt trails were added throughout the Meadow. Additionally, it continues to play an important role in flood control for the surrounding neighborhoods, as the soil in the wetlands absorbs flood waters.

=== Wildfires ===
In the 21st century, there have been two large wildfires in Great Meadows. The first one occurred on April 23, 2008. Nine acres of upland forest near a nursing home were damaged. The fire was set by six teenagers playing in the woods, though it is unclear if the fire was ignited accidentally or intentionally. Almost a year later, on April 17, 2009, the meadow was hit with another fire. Two firefighters were injured and the fire came within feet of nearby homes. Twenty-two local fire departments and state police responded to help extinguish the blaze, which took four and a half hours to put out. Over a dozen acres burned off in the fire. The cause of the fire is believed to be the result of human activity. However, it remains unclear if the fire was started intentionally or not.

== Wildlife and vegetation ==
Great Meadows hosts a wide range of wildlife and vegetation, with over 400 species of plants and animals. 56 species of birds, 12 species of reptiles and amphibians, and many varieties of mammals reside in the uplands. Some varieties of fish and 251 species of plants have been found in the wet meadows.

== Activities and amenities ==
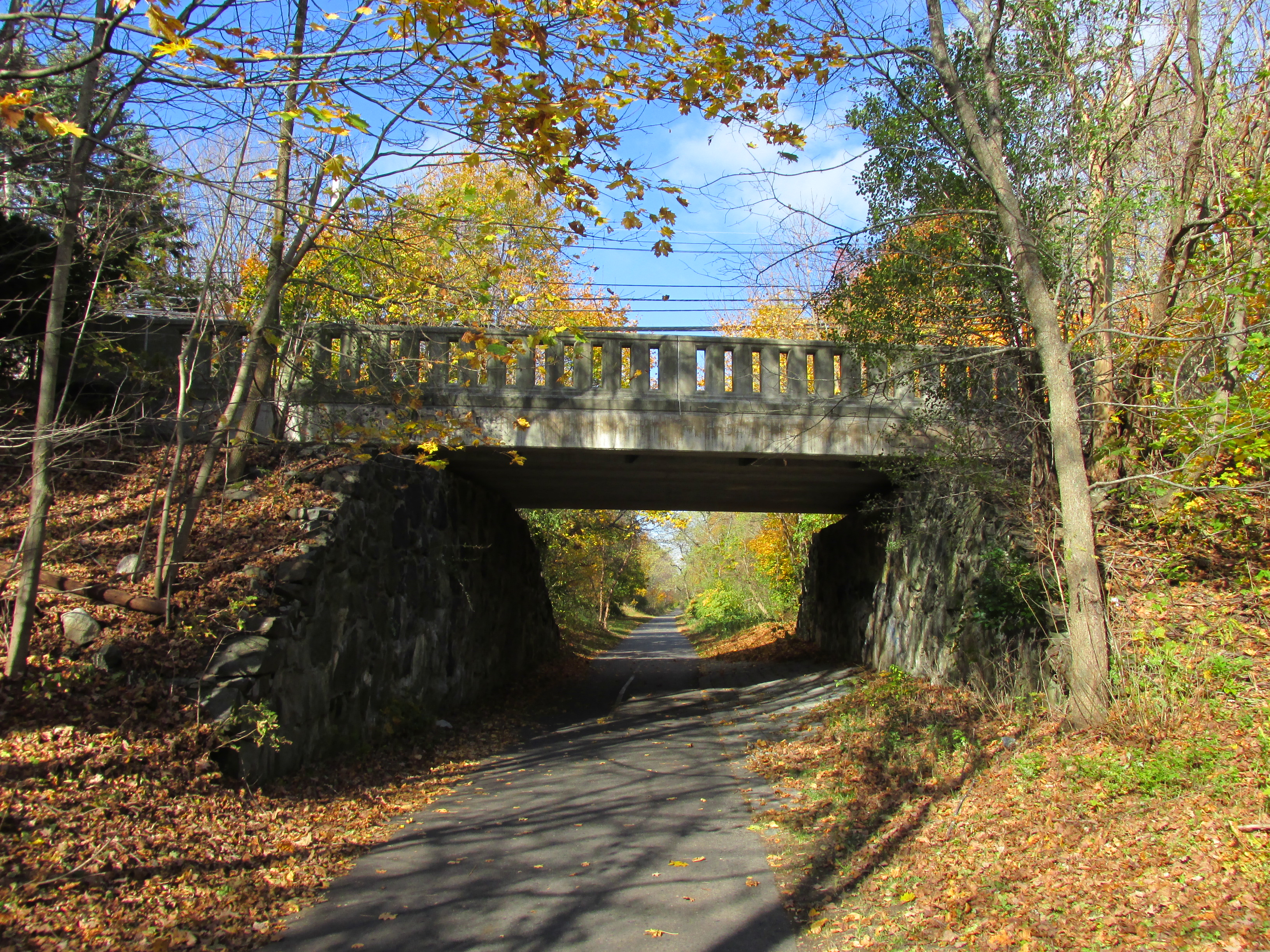
The Minuteman Bikeway at the Solomon Pierce Bridge, which is located adjacent to a trail leading into the heart of Great Meadows

The park offers a 1.9-mile (3.1 km) network of compact dirt trails for pedestrian and bicycle use. Activities include hiking, walking, jogging, cycling, and photography. The trail's terrain is considered child- and animal-friendly. The trails directly connect to the 10-mile-long (16 km) Minuteman Bikeway. Additional entry points can be found in surrounding neighborhoods, including at Lexington Christian Academy.

== See also ==
- Arlington, Massachusetts
- Minuteman Bikeway
