= Patrick Fuchs =

American public official

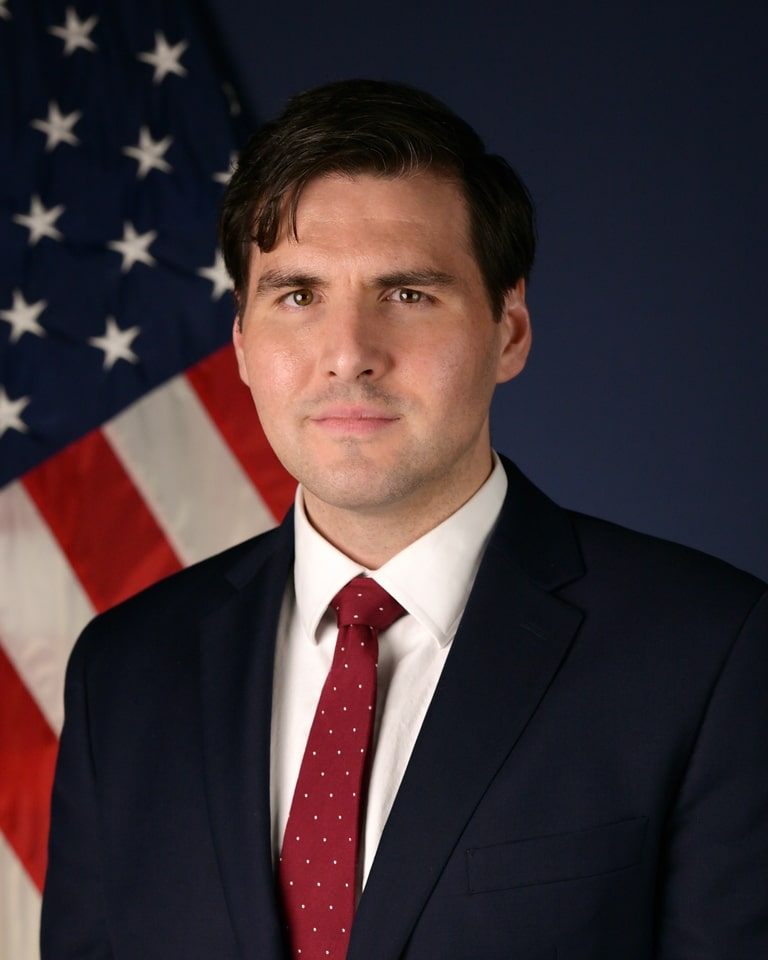
- Official portrait, 2026

Chairman of the Surface Transportation Board
- Incumbent
- Assumed office January 20, 2025
- President: Donald Trump
- Preceded by: Robert E. Primus

Member of the Surface Transportation Board
- Incumbent
- Assumed office January 17, 2019
- President: Donald Trump; Joe Biden; Donald Trump
- Preceded by: New Position

Personal details
- Party: Republican
- Education: University of Wisconsin–Madison (BA, MA); National University of Singapore

Patrick Fuchs is an American public official who has served as a member of the Surface Transportation Board (STB) since January 17, 2019. He is a member of the Republican Party.

== Education ==
Fuchs received his undergraduate education at the University of Wisconsin–Madison, where he later received a master's degree in public policy analysis and management. During his education, Fuchs took part in an international economic program hosted by the National University of Singapore.

== Career ==
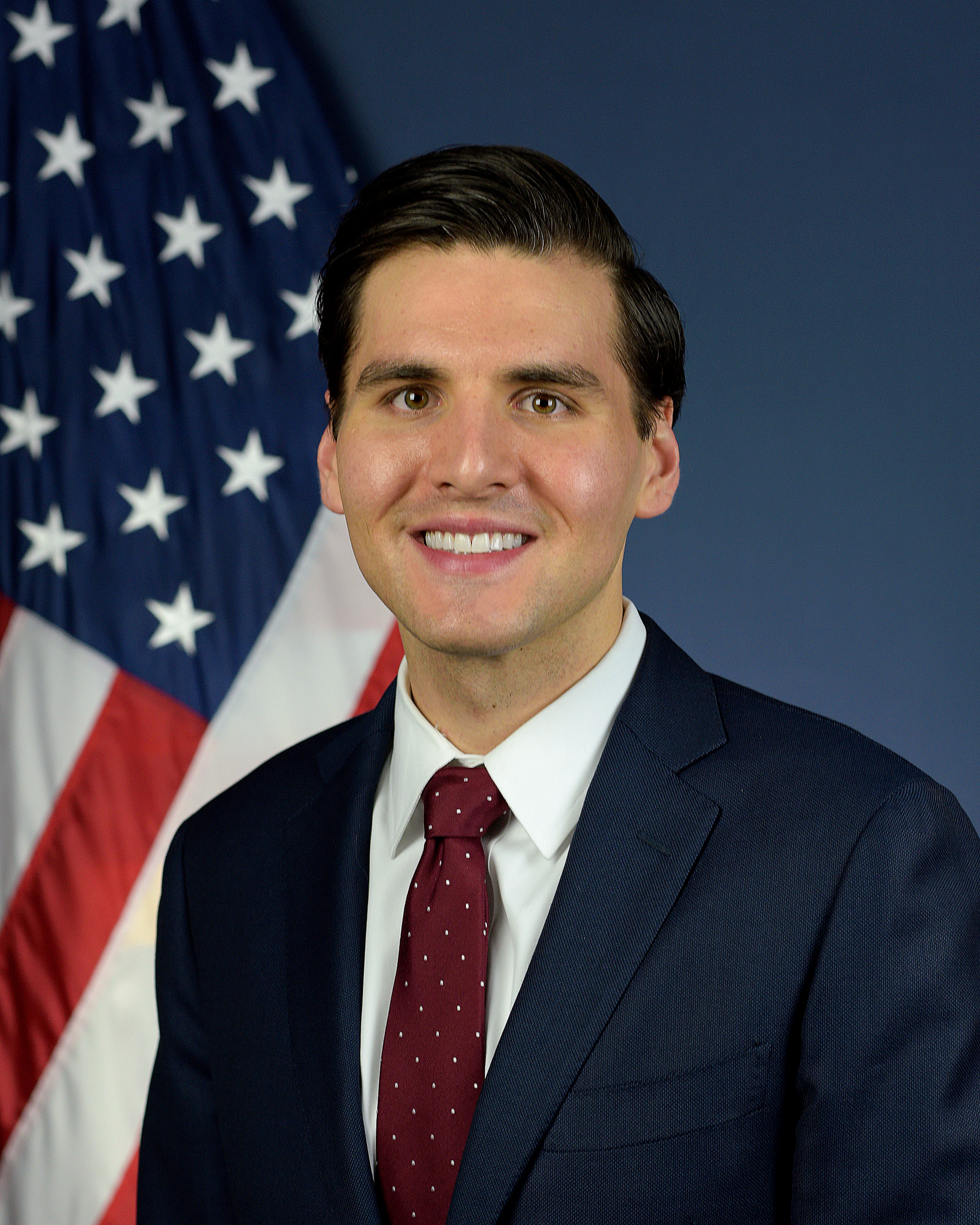
Official portrait, 2019

In 2011, Fuchs was chosen to be a Presidential Management Fellow at the White House Office of Information and Regulatory Affairs. Prior to joining the STB, Fuchs was a staffer on the Senate Commerce Committee, where he worked on the 2015 Surface Transportation Board Reauthorization Act.

=== Surface Transportation Board ===
In March 2018, Fuchs was nominated by President Donald Trump to serve as a member of the Surface Transportation Board (STB). He was confirmed by the United States Senate and took office on January 17, 2019. He was designated to serve as the Chair of the Surface Transportation Board by President Donald Trump on January 20, 2025.
