= Title 49 of the United States Code =

U.S. federal statutes on transportation

Title 49 of the United States Code is a positive law title of the United States Code with the heading "Transportation."

The title was enacted into positive law by Pub. L. 95–473, § 1, October 17, 1978, 92 Stat. 1337; Pub. L. 97–449, § 1, January 12, 1983, 96 Stat. 2413; and Pub. L. 103–272, July 5, 1994, 108 Stat. 745 (subtitles II, III, and V-X)

During the time between when the Title 49 positive law codification began in 1978 and when it was completed in 1994, the remaining non-positive law sections were placed in an appendix to Title 49.

In 1995, the ICC Termination Act, substantively and significantly amended Title 49.

In 2010, Congress enacted Title 51 as a new positive law title concerning NASA and commercial space programs. As part of the codification, the heading of Subtitle IX was marked "transferred" and the contents of such subtitle were moved to Title 51. Five years later, the FAST Act inserted a new Subtitle IX. The heading of new Subtitle IX was given the heading "Multimodal Freight Transportation."

- Subtitle I—Department of Transportation
- Subtitle II—Other Government Agencies
- Subtitle III—General and Intermodal Programs
- Subtitle IV—Interstate Transportation
- Subtitle V—Rail Programs
- Subtitle VI—Motor Vehicle and Driver Programs
- Subtitle VII—Aviation Programs
- Subtitle VIII—Pipelines
- Subtitle IX—Multimodal Freight Transportation
- Subtitle X—Miscellaneous

== Outline of title 49 ==
Title 49

=== Subtitle I — Department of Transportation ===
Subtitle I

- Chapter 1 — Organization
- Chapter 3 — General Duties and Powers
- Chapter 5 — Special Authority
- Chapter 7 — Transferred

=== Subtitle II — Other Government Agencies ===
Subtitle II

- Chapter 11 — National Transportation Safety Board
- Chapter 13 — Surface Transportation Board

=== Subtitle III — General and Intermodal Programs ===
Subtitle III

- Chapter 51 — Transportation of Hazardous Material
- Chapter 53 — Public Transportation
- Chapter 55 — Intermodal Transportation
- Chapter 57 — Sanitary Food Transportation
- Chapter 59 — Intermodal Safe Container Transportation
- Chapter 61 — One-Call Notification Programs
- Chapter 63 — Bureau of Transportation Statistics
- Chapter 65 — Research Planning
- Chapter 67 — Multimodal Infrastructure Investments

=== Subtitle IV — Interstate Transportation ===
Subtitle IV

- Part A — Rail
  - Chapter 101 — General Provisions
  - Chapter 105 — Jurisdiction
  - Chapter 107 — Rates
  - Chapter 109 — Licensing
  - Chapter 111 — Operations
  - Chapter 113 — Finance
  - Chapter 115 — Federal-State Relations
  - Chapter 117 — Enforcement: Investigations, Rights, and Remedies
  - Chapter 119 — Civil and Criminal Penalties
- Part B — Motor Carriers, Water Carriers, Brokers, and Freight Forwarders
  - Chapter 131 — General Provisions
  - Chapter 133 — Administrative Provisions
  - Chapter 135 — Jurisdiction
  - Chapter 137 — Rates and Through Routes
  - Chapter 139 — Registration
  - Chapter 141 — Operations of Carriers
  - Chapter 143 — Finance
  - Chapter 145 — Federal-State Relations
  - Chapter 147 — Enforcement; Investigations; Rights; Remedies
  - Chapter 149 — Civil and Criminal Penalties
- Part C — Pipeline Carriers
  - Chapter 151 — General Provisions
  - Chapter 153 — Jurisdiction
  - Chapter 155 — Rates
  - Chapter 157 — Operations of Carriers
  - Chapter 159 — Enforcement: Investigations, Rights, and Remedies
  - Chapter 161 — Civil and Criminal Penalties

=== Subtitle V — Rail Programs ===
Subtitle V

- Part A — Safety
  - Chapter 201 — General
  - Chapter 203 — Safety Appliances
  - Chapter 205 — Signal Systems
  - Chapter 207 — Locomotives
  - Chapter 209 — Accidents and Incidents
  - Chapter 211 — Hours of Service
  - Chapter 213 — Penalties
- Part B — Assistance
  - Chapter 221 — Local Rail Freight Assistance
  - Chapter 223 — Capital Grants for Class II and Class III Railroads
  - Chapter 224 — Railroad Rehabilitation and Improvement Financing
  - Chapter 225 — Repealed
  - Chapter 227 — State Rail Plans
  - Chapter 229 — Rail Improvement Grants
- Part C — Passenger Transportation
  - Chapter 241 — General
  - Chapter 242 — Project Delivery
  - Chapter 243 — Amtrak
  - Chapter 244 — Transferred
  - Chapter 245 — Repealed
  - Chapter 247 — Amtrak Route System
  - Chapter 249 — Northeast Corridor Improvement Program
  - Chapter 251 — Passenger Rail Planning
- Part D — High-Speed Rail
  - Chapter 261 — High-Speed Rail Assistance
- Part E — Miscellaneous
  - Chapter 281 — Law Enforcement
  - Chapter 283 — Standard Work Day
  - Chapter 285 — Commuter Rail Mediation

=== Subtitle VI — Motor Vehicle and Driver Programs ===
Subtitle VI

- Part A — General
  - Chapter 301 — Motor Vehicle Safety
  - Chapter 303 — National Driver Register
  - Chapter 305 — National Motor Vehicle Title Information System
- Part B — Commercial
  - Chapter 311 — Commercial Motor Vehicle Safety
  - Chapter 313 — Commercial Motor Vehicle Operators
  - Chapter 315 — Motor Carrier Safety
  - Chapter 317 — Participation in International Registration Plan and International Fuel Tax Agreement
- Part C — Information, Standards, and Requirements
  - Chapter 321 — General
  - Chapter 323 — Consumer Information
  - Chapter 325 — Bumper Standards
  - Chapter 327 — Odometers
  - Chapter 329 — Automobile Fuel Economy
  - Chapter 331 — Theft Prevention

=== Subtitle VII — Aviation Programs ===
Subtitle VII

- Part A — Air Commerce and Safety
  - Subpart I — General
    - Chapter 401 — General Provisions
  - Subpart II — Economic Regulation
    - Chapter 411 — Air Carrier Certificates
    - Chapter 413 — Foreign Air Transportation
    - Chapter 415 — Pricing
    - Chapter 417 — Operations of Carriers
    - Chapter 419 — Transportation of Mail
    - Chapter 421 — Labor-Management Provisions
    - Chapter 423 — Passenger Air Service Improvements
  - Subpart III — Safety
    - Chapter 441 — Registration and Recordation of Aircraft
    - Chapter 443 — Insurance
    - Chapter 445 — Facilities, Personnel, and Research
    - Chapter 447 — Safety Regulation
    - Chapter 448 — Unmanned Aircraft Systems
    - Chapter 449 — Security
    - Chapter 451 — Alcohol and Controlled Substances Testing
    - Chapter 453 — Fees
  - Subpart IV — Enforcement and Penalties
    - Chapter 461 — Investigations and Proceedings
    - Chapter 463 — Penalties
    - Chapter 465 — Special Aircraft Jurisdiction of the United States
- Part B — Airport Development and Noise
  - Chapter 471 — Airport Development
  - Chapter 473 — International Airport Facilities
  - Chapter 475 — Noise
- Part C — Financing
  - Chapter 481 — Airport and Airway Trust Fund Authorizations
  - Chapter 482 — Advance Appropriations for Airport and Airway Trust Facilities
  - Chapter 483 — Repealed
- Part D — Public Airports
  - Chapter 491 — Metropolitan Washington Airports
- Part E — Miscellaneous
  - Chapter 501 — Buy-American Preferences

=== Subtitle VIII — Pipelines ===
Subtitle VIII

- Chapter 601 — Safety
- Chapter 603 — User Fees
- Chapter 605 — Interstate Commerce Regulation

=== Subtitle IX — Multimodal Freight Transportation ===
Subtitle IX

- Chapter 701 — Multimodal Freight Policy
- Chapter 702 — Multimodal Freight Transportation Planning and Information
- Chapter 703 — Transferred

=== Subtitle X — Miscellaneous ===
Subtitle X

- Chapter 801 — Bills of Lading
- Chapter 803 — Contraband
- Chapter 805 — Miscellaneous
