= Laura DiBella =

American governmental affairs advisor and civil servant

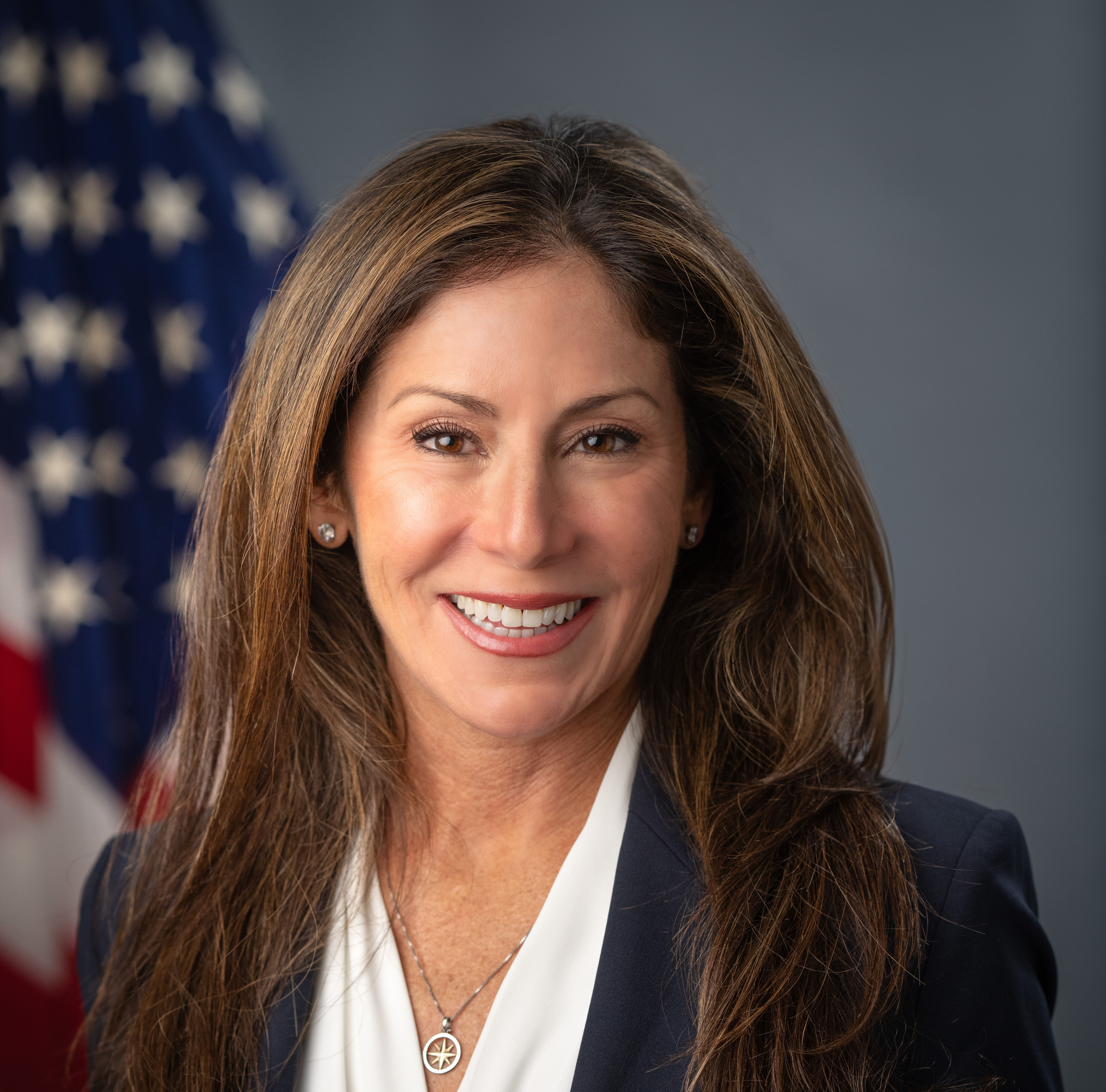
- Official portrait, 2025

Chair of the Federal Maritime Commission
- Incumbent
- Assumed office January 28, 2026
- President: Donald Trump
- Preceded by: Louis E. Sola

Commissioner of the Federal Maritime Commission
- Incumbent
- Assumed office January 6, 2026
- President: Donald Trump
- Preceded by: Louis E. Sola

Personal details
- Party: Republican
- Education: University of Florida (BS)

Laura DiBella is an American governmental affairs advisor and civil servant who has served as the Chair of the Federal Maritime Commission since 2026. She was previously the President of Business Development at FloridaCommerce and the Secretary of Commerce of Florida as President of Enterprise Florida.

== Early life and education ==
She earned a BS in business development from the University of Florida.

== Career ==
She has served as the executive director of the Nassau County Economic Development Board, as the Port Director of the Port of Fernandina, and as the executive director of the Florida Harbor Pilots Association.

She became Florida's first female Secretary of Commerce as president of Enterprise Florida, and also worked as President of Business Development at FloridaCommerce and as a consultant.

== Federal Maritime Commission ==
President Donald Trump nominated DiBella to become a Commissioner of the Federal Maritime Commission on September 3, 2025. She was sworn in on January 6, 2026.

Trump then made her Chair of the Commission on January 28, 2026. Her choice left some shippers concerned due to her close alliance to Trump.
