= Michael Khouri =

U.S. Government personnel

Michael A. Khouri
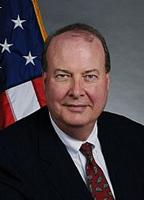

Chairman of the Federal Maritime Commission
- In office January 23, 2017 (acting); March 3, 2019 – March 29, 2021
- President: Donald Trump; Joe Biden
- Preceded by: Mario Cordero
- Succeeded by: Dan Maffei

Commissioner of the Federal Maritime Commission
- In office December 2009 – February 15, 2022
- President: Barack Obama; Donald Trump; Joe Biden
- Preceded by: Steven R. Blust
- Succeeded by: Max Vekich

Personal details
- Party: Republican
- Education: Tulane University (BA, Economics); Brandeis School of Law, University of Louisville (JD); Harvard Business School (AMP)
- Occupation: Commissioner, Federal Maritime Commission

Michael A. Khouri is a former commissioner of the Federal Maritime Commission. He was nominated by President Obama and confirmed by the U.S. Senate in December 2009. President Trump designated him as acting chairman on January 23, 2017, and then designated him as chairman on March 3, 2019. He was succeeded by Chairman Maffei in March 2021.

== Early life ==
Khouri was born in Louisville in the U.S. state of Kentucky. He is the son of a Lebanese-American father and German-English mother. Following military service in Texas, the family moved to Paducah, Kentucky. He graduated from Paducah Tilghman High School. He attended Tulane University in Louisiana earning a B.A. in Economics and later earned a J.D. from the University of Louisville in Kentucky.

== Career ==
Khouri is a career veteran in the maritime industry from positions held in marine vessel operations, legal, and executive general management assignments. The marine companies include Crounse Corporation, American Commercial Lines, MERS/Economy Boat and Pedley & Gordinier.

He succeeded Mario Cordero as Chairman of the FMC, who left office in 2017. Khouri was first nominated to the commission by President Obama and confirmed by the U.S. Senate in December 2009. President Donald Trump named Michael A. Khouri as chairman on March 7, 2019.

== See also ==
- Daniel B. Maffei
- Louis E. Sola
- Rebecca F. Dye
