= Louis E. Sola =

American politician (born 1968)

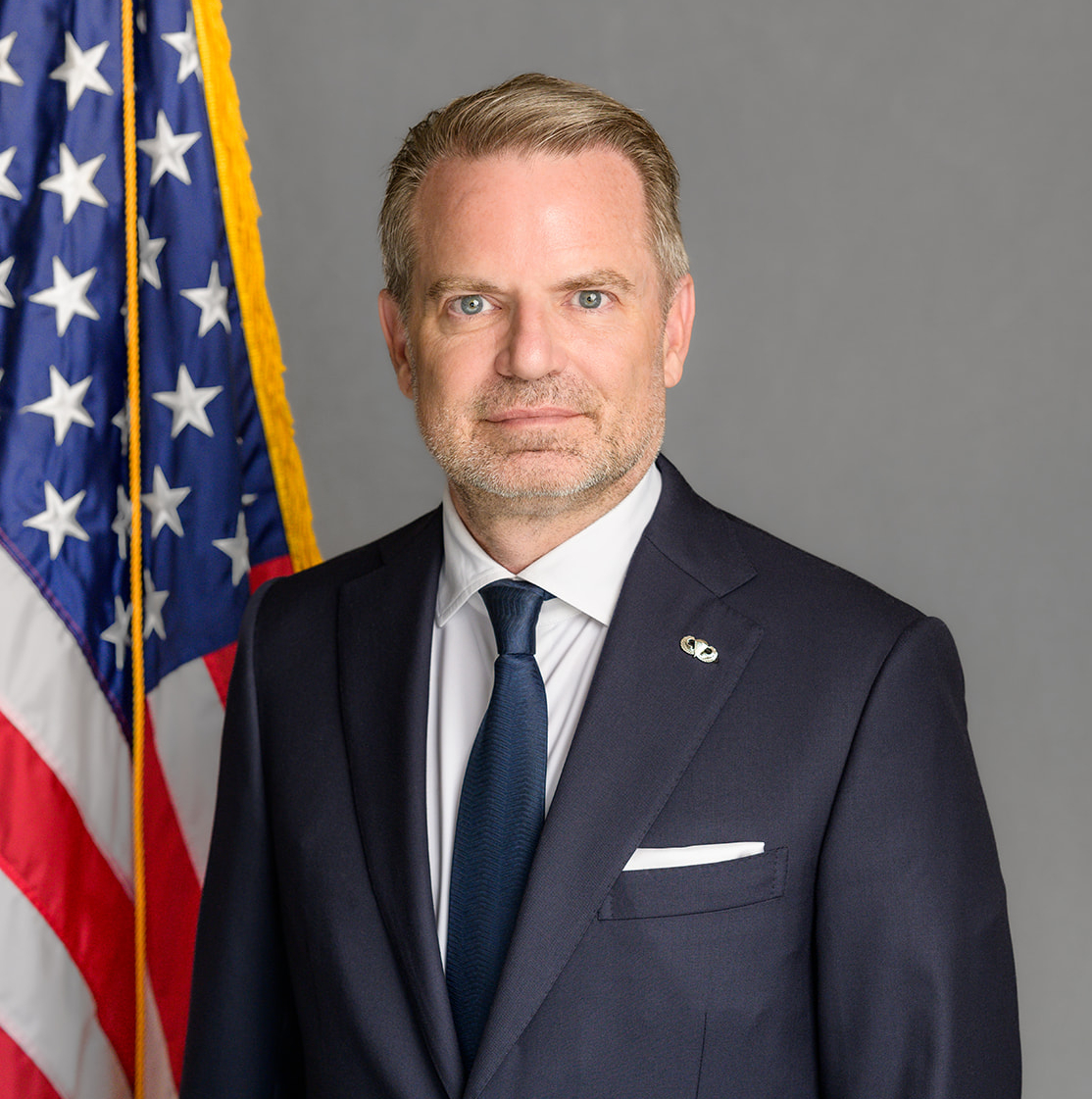
- Official portrait, 2024

Chairman of the Federal Maritime Commission
- In office January 20, 2025 – June 30, 2025
- President: Donald Trump
- Preceded by: Dan Maffei
- Succeeded by: Laura DiBella

Commissioner of the Federal Maritime Commission
- In office January 23, 2019 – June 30, 2025
- President: Donald Trump; Joe Biden; Donald Trump
- Preceded by: William P. Doyle
- Succeeded by: Laura DiBella

Personal details
- Born: Louis Ernest Sola; January 8, 1968 (age 58) Chicago, Illinois, U.S.
- Party: Republican
- Education: Parkland College (AA); Nova Southeastern University (BS); University of Illinois, Urbana-Champaign (MS)

Military service
- Allegiance: United States
- Branch/service: United States Army
- Years of service: 1986–1997
- Awards: Humanitarian Service Medal - 1994 Cuban rafter crisis

Louis Ernest Sola (born January 8, 1968) is an American maritime policy strategist, national security analyst, and former U.S. federal official. He served as the Chairman of the Federal Maritime Commission until 2025. Appointed by President Donald J. Trump and confirmed by the U.S. Senate, Sola worked alongside Commissioners Daniel B. Maffei, Rebecca F. Dye, and Max Vekich during his tenure. He now works as a partner at Thorn Run Partners, a government relations and strategic consulting firm, in Washington, D.C.

On November 15, 2018, Sola was nominated to the U.S. Federal Maritime Commission by President Trump and was confirmed by the United States Senate on January 2, 2019. He was sworn into office on January 23, 2019 during the government shutdown. On January 20, 2025, President Trump designated Sola as the Chairman of the U.S. Federal Maritime Commission. He completed his federal service on June 30, 2025.

== Early life and education ==
Sola was born in Chicago, Illinois, but grew up in Goodland, Indiana and within the Panama Canal Zone. He received an associate degree in history from Parkland College in 1989 where he returned to give the 2022 commencement address and was bestowed with the Distinguished Alumnus Award. In 1996, he received a bachelor's degree in management from the Nova Southeastern University and earned a master's in international finance from the University of Illinois in 1998. He was a two-time graduate in Spanish and German of the Defense Language Institute within the Foreign Language Center at the Presidio of Monterey, CA.

== Early career ==
Early in his career, Sola worked as a sales executive with Camper & Nicholsons (Fincantieri), Northrop Grumman, and Azimut Benetti.

In 2015, Florida Governor Rick Scott appointed Sola to serve on the state's Board of Pilots Commissioners where he was responsible for licensing and regulating harbor pilots. During that time, Sola also served on the probable cause panel for maritime incidents.

A licensed international ship and yacht broker, Sola has constructed more than 125 new yachts and ships and founded Evermarine, a Miami based mega yacht brokerage company.

He also shared his knowledge as an adjunct professor at Florida State University and as a consultant for the Inter-American Development Bank in 1999, during the United States handover of the Panama Canal.

== Military career ==
Sola served in the United States Army from 1986 - 1997 as a strategic debriefer, interrogator, and counterintelligence agent. He was assigned to the 18th Battalion within the Military Intelligence Corps (United States Army) in Munich, Germany (part of the 66th Military Intelligence Brigade and the U.S. Army Intelligence and Security Command) where he conducted human intelligence operations and debriefed refugees from Eastern Europe immediately following the fall of the Berlin Wall. Subsequently, he served with the 470th Military Intelligence Brigade in Panama as an interrogator and Spanish linguist. In this role, he supported counterintelligence and counternarcotics missions for the United States Southern Command under General Barry McCaffrey during the War on Drugs and the fall of Pablo Escobar. Sola earned the U.S. Army Parachutist Badge (Airborne) and was awarded the Humanitarian Service Medal for his efforts during the 1994 Cuban rafter crisis. His first-hand accounts of the Cuban people's resilience were reported in the Financial Times. On numerous occasions, Sola has honored his grandfather for his service and sacrifice during World War II and given him credit for encouraging his own enlistment in the U.S. Army.

== Politics ==
In 2018, Sola ran for the United States House of Representatives in Florida's 24th congressional district as a Republican candidate against Democratic incumbent Frederica Wilson. Sola publicly stated that he would not run again for Florida's 26th congressional district in the subsequent 2020 election. He has been featured in the media for his involvement in conservative politics as a donor and an early supporter of Trump in 2016. He also endorsed Trump for President in 2020 and 2024 and continues to be a strong advocate for the president's America First policy.

== Federal Maritime Commission ==
Louis Sola was first nominated to the U.S. Federal Maritime Commission by President Trump on November 15, 2018 to a five year term that expired on June 30, 2023. The United States Senate confirmed his nomination on January 2, 2019 and he was sworn into office on January 23, 2019. He was later renominated to continuing serving in the bi-partisan post by President Joseph R. Biden in 2024, and later designated to the Chair of the U.S. Federal Maritime Commission by President Trump on January 20, 2025.

On April 30, 2020, the U.S. Federal Maritime Commission appointed Sola to lead "Fact Finding 30," a federal fact-finding investigation into the impacts of COVID-19 on the cruise industry. This investigation focused on cruise line performance, the ticket refund policy, and the economic impacts of the CDC's "No Sail Order". At the end of his research, Sola recommended an "urgent need for ships to start sailing again," due to the economic impacts on the nation's ports, local governments, and small businesses.

On March 25, 2021, Sola published his "cruise-forward" plan for resumption of cruising which focused on shore side, crew and passenger vaccinations, while at the same time calling on President Biden to donate vaccines to Caribbean and Central American cruise ports. Due to the Canadian ban on cruise ships through 2022, he also called for a modification to the Passenger Vessel Services Act of 1886. That legislation required that cruise ships to stop at a foreign port before calling again on a U.S. port that eventually became known as the Alaska Tourism Act. Sola also proposed that the federal consumer protection rule change to a standardize refund practice in the cruise industry in order to protect passengers from cancellations.

In an interview with CNBC concerning cruise line mandates requiring passengers to have COVID-19 vaccinations before boarding Sola said, “I feel much safer on a cruise ship than I do flying." His strong advocacy for the industry earned him the nickname, "Cruise Czar." In 2021, Sola was awarded the Seatrade Outstanding Achievement Award which he dedicated to seafarers and crew members saying, "Without them, we wouldn't be here."

Following the end of the global Covid-19 pandemic, Sola leveraged his experience in international trade to the commission's agenda by helping meet its mandate to ensure a competitive and reliable supply chain focused on promoting U.S. exports through Office Of The United States Trade Representative and the Export–Import Bank of the United States. In 2024, when he was renominated to the post by President Biden, Sola was publicly endorsed by 73 different trade, agriculture and transportation industry groups.

He has actively advocated for the reduction of Green House Gases in maritime transport through greater efficiency and the use of alternate marine fuels in international trade by engaging stakeholders and government representatives to form an "Alternate Marine Fuels Challenge" to lessen emissions. In an open letter to President Biden, Sola called for the private sector to form an alternative marine fuel coalition, "to determine the appropriate standards and benchmarks for seeking progress in decarbonization", which should also receive government financial support.

In December 2024, Sola criticized Spain's ban on U.S. ships carrying aid to Israel calling it a "violation of the law which could result in substantial offsetting fines on Spanish-flag vessels, limitations on cargo carried between Spain and the United States, and other remedial actions within the commission’s discretion." He said that, "disruptions to international trade systems not only threaten global shipping networks, but also compromise the consumer markets they support."

On January 28, 2025, the chairman testified before the U.S. Senate Committee on Commerce, Science, and Transportation in a hearing titled, Fees and Foreign Influence: Examining the Panama Canal and Its Impact on U.S. Trade and National Security. He provided testimony about the nefarious influence of China in the region.

On January 20, 2025 President Trump designated Sola to the Chair of the U.S. Federal Maritime Commission. He completed his service on June 30, 2025.

== Thorn Run Partners ==
Following his departure from the U.S. Federal Maritime Commission on June 30, 2025, Sola became a partner at Thorn Run Partners (TRP), a Washington, D.C. based government relations and strategic consulting firm, leading its maritime and logistics practice. In headlines announcing his new role, FreightWaves.com, an industry price reporting agency, called Sola the "U.S. Shipping Czar".

At Thorn Run Partners, he has concentrated on maritime, national security, and international trade policies, and has been particularly focused on highlighting and eradicating China's maritime influence on global port infrastructure, as well as expanding U.S. flagged vessel capacity and the Jones Act.

Sola remains an advocate for deflagging Iran-linked vessels which operate under flags of convenience and builds on his federal maritime commission (FMC) achievement of removing more than 100 vessels identified with connections to the Iran's shadow fleet operations.

In the private sector, Sola maintains support for the U.S. policy on the Panama Canal and opposes the transition of key canal adjacent port terminals due to its inconsistency with U.S. strategic interests. His work on Latin America's port infrastructure draws on long-standing relationships developed during his FMC tenure, as well as his earlier experience consulting for the Inter-American Development Bank during the U.S. handover of the Panama Canal.

At TRP, Sola has been a champion of alternative marine fuels with an emphasis on liquefied natural gas (LNG), bio-LNG bunkering infrastructure and growing the practice on related policy.

== Recognition ==
In 2022, Sola was honored by the Panama Canal Authority with the award of its Master Key and Honorary Lead Pilot distinction. He was also bestowed the 2021 Seatrade Cruise Man of the Year for his work supporting seafarers during the COVID-19 pandemic.

The Miami-Dade County Board of Commissioners recognized Sola for his lifelong commitment to public service and promoting vaccines for non-US crew members during the COVID-19 pandemic by presenting him with the Keys to the County and proclaiming June 18, 2024 as Commissioner Louis E. Sola Day.

On June 30, 2025, his last day of his service as the Chairman of the U.S. Federal Maritime Commission, Sola was awarded a gold medal and Citation by the U.S. Federal Maritime Commission. He was also presented with the 2025 American Caribbean Maritime Foundation Anchor Award.

In 2026, Sola was named to Washingtonian magazine's "500 Most Powerful People in Washington".

== See also ==
- Daniel B. Maffei
- Federal Maritime Commission
- United States Federal Maritime Board
