= Dan Maffei =

American politician (born 1968)

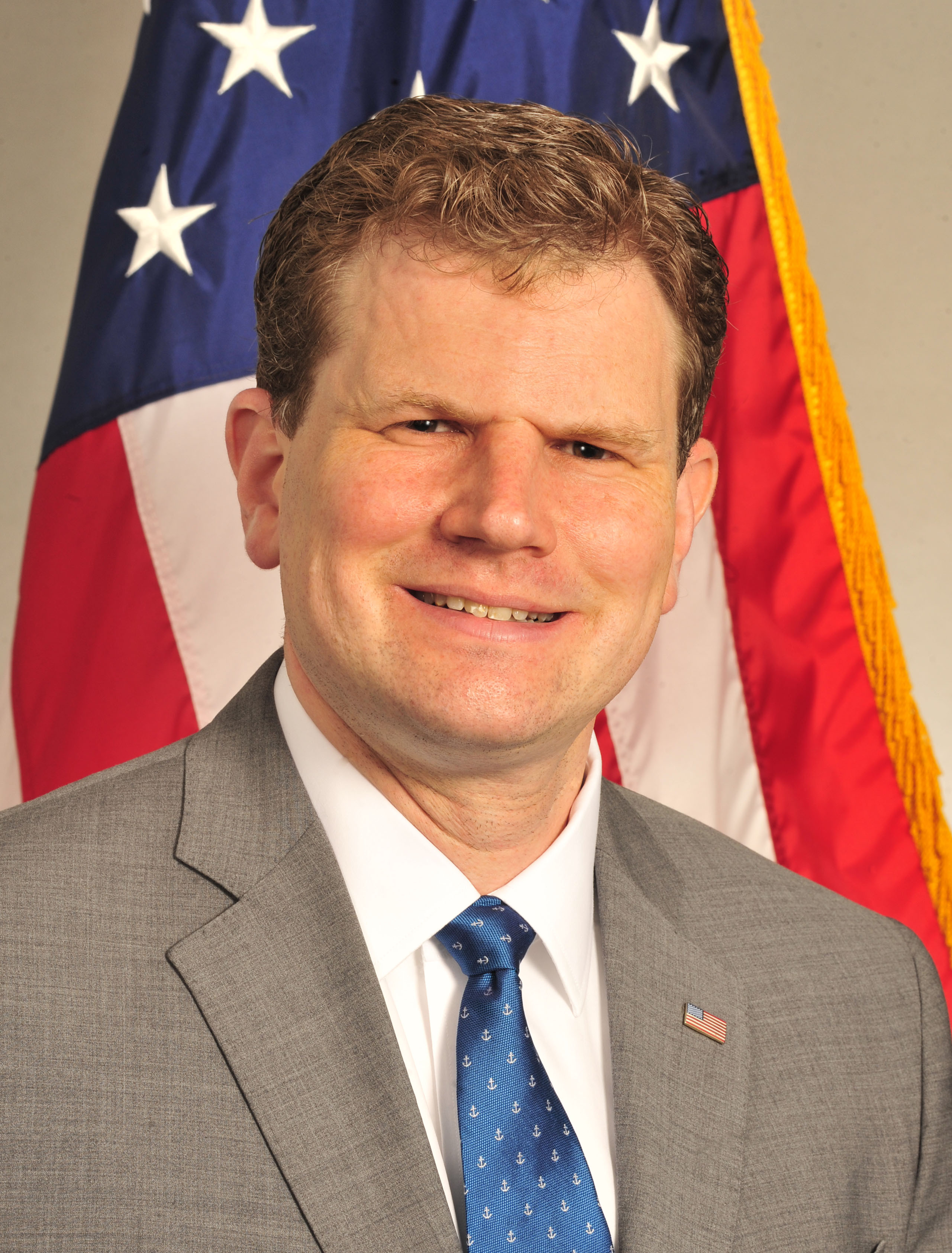

Chair of the Federal Maritime Commission
- In office March 29, 2021 – January 20, 2025
- President: Joe Biden
- Preceded by: Michael Khouri
- Succeeded by: Louis E. Sola

Commissioner of the Federal Maritime Commission
- Incumbent
- Assumed office January 23, 2019
- Nominated by: Donald Trump
- Preceded by: Himself
- In office June 30, 2016 – June 30, 2018
- Nominated by: Barack Obama
- Preceded by: Richard Lidinsky
- Succeeded by: Himself

Member of the U.S. House of Representatives from New York
- In office January 3, 2013 – January 3, 2015
- Preceded by: Ann Marie Buerkle
- Succeeded by: John Katko
- Constituency: 24th district
- In office January 3, 2009 – January 3, 2011
- Preceded by: James T. Walsh
- Succeeded by: Ann Marie Buerkle
- Constituency: 25th district

Personal details
- Born: Daniel Benjamin Maffei; July 4, 1968 (age 58) Syracuse, New York, U.S.
- Party: Democratic
- Spouse: Abby Davidson
- Education: Brown University (BA); Columbia University (MS); Harvard University (MPP)

Daniel Benjamin Maffei (/məˈfeɪ/ mə-FAY; born July 4, 1968) is an American politician and professor who served two non-consecutive terms in the U.S. House of Representatives before being appointed as a commissioner to the Federal Maritime Commission, serving as chairman from 2021 to 2025.

He was the United States representative for New York's 24th congressional district from 2013 to 2015. Maffei previously represented the district, then numbered as New York's 25th congressional district, from 2009 to 2011. He has also worked as a senior adviser at law firm Manatt, Phelps & Phillips.

On November 6, 2012, Maffei defeated incumbent 25th district Republican Ann Marie Buerkle in the race for the redistricted 24th, avenging his 2010 loss. Maffei lost his 2014 reelection campaign to Republican nominee John Katko.

He then served as Commissioner of the Federal Maritime Commission from 2016 to 2018 and was re-appointed in November 2018 to a term ending in 2022. During the four month lapse in his Maritime Commissioner post, Maffei was a professor of practice at George Washington University.

== Early life, education, and early career ==
Maffei was born in Syracuse and currently resides there. He graduated from Nottingham Senior High School in 1986, and continued on to receive a B.A. in history from Brown University in 1990, an M.S. in journalism from the Columbia University Graduate School of Journalism in 1991, and an M.P.P. from the John F. Kennedy School of Government at Harvard University in 1995.

Upon graduating from Columbia, Maffei went to work as a reporter and producer for Syracuse's ABC affiliate WSYR-TV from 1991 to 1993, and part-time reporter for WWNY-TV in Watertown from then until 1995.

Maffei was the senior vice president for corporate development at consulting firm Pinnacle Capital Management.

== Early political career ==
Dan's career on Capitol Hill started with an unpaid internship in 1996 with New York Congressman Eliot Engel. He was hired as a press secretary for U.S. Senator Bill Bradley in 1996, then served in the same post for Senator Daniel Patrick Moynihan from 1997 to 1998. After working on Senator Bradley's presidential campaign from 1998 to 1999, Maffei went to work for U.S. Representative Charlie Rangel from 1999 to 2005, serving as a senior staff member of the House Ways and Means Committee.

In 2005, Maffei returned to Syracuse to coordinate the successful 2005 re-election campaign of Syracuse Mayor Matt Driscoll.

=== First congressional campaign ===
Following his successful return, Maffei decided to make his first bid for public office, challenging popular nine-term Republican Congressman Jim Walsh. He earned the Democratic nomination and mounted the first serious challenge to Walsh in years, coming within two percentage points of defeating the incumbent. Maffei won in the City of Syracuse and the rest of Onondaga County, Walsh's home turf, as well as Monroe County.

== U.S. House of Representatives (2009–2011; 2013–2015) ==
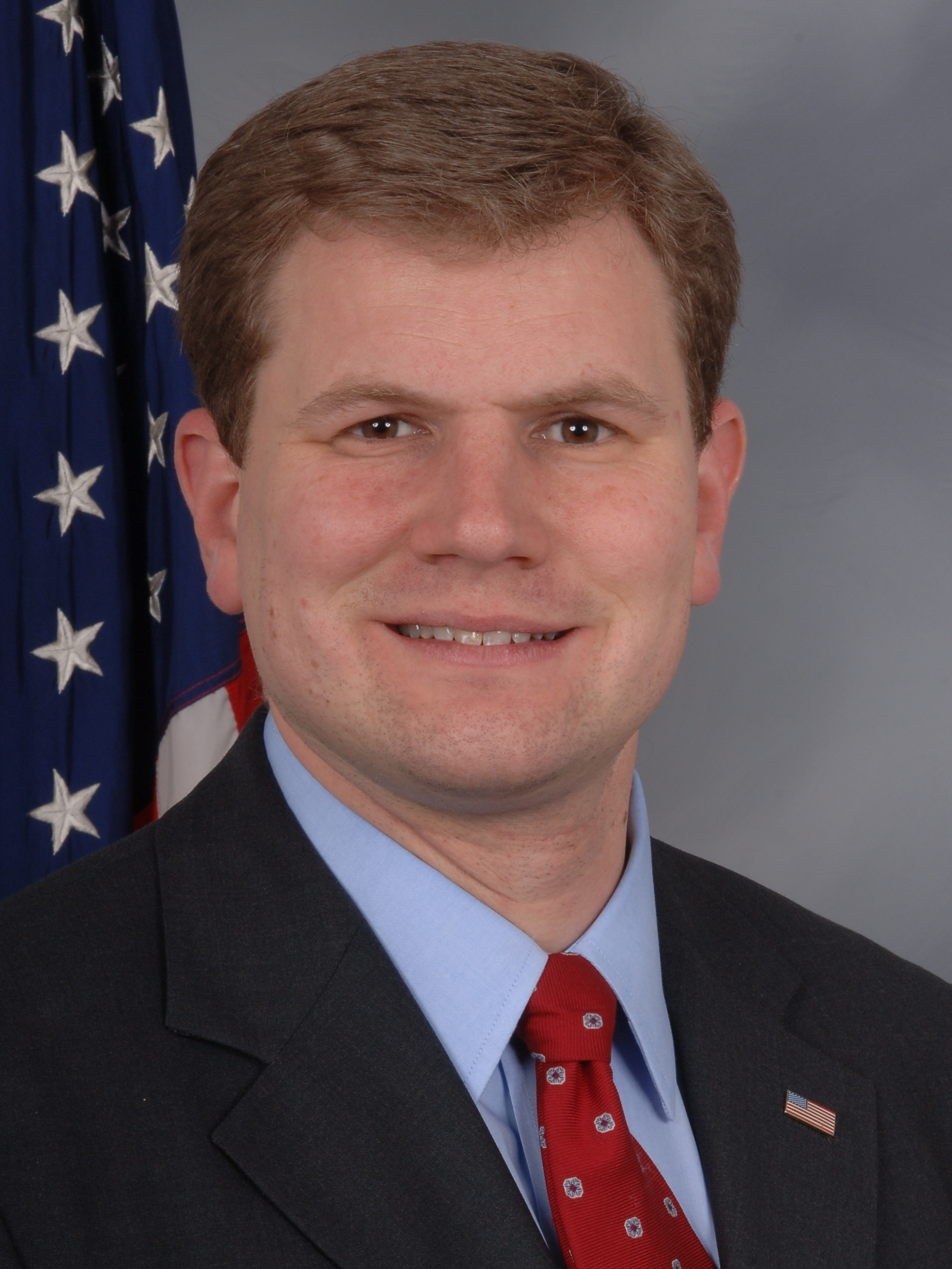
Maffei during the 111th Congress

=== Elections ===
2008

On January 24, 2008, after Maffei had already mounted a strong opposition campaign, Walsh announced that he would not be running for an 11th term. In March 2008, Mayor Driscoll announced he would not be running for the seat, effectively handing the nomination to Maffei. He ran unopposed in the Democratic primary on September 9, 2008. After it appeared he might run unopposed in the general election, on April 3, 2008, Onondaga County legislator Dale Sweetland, coming off a narrowly unsuccessful 2007 bid for Onondaga County Executive, announced that he would oppose Maffei.

Maffei was solidly favored to win the seat. In addition to rating the district as 'Leans Democratic', RealClearPolitics ranked this as the third most likely Congressional district to switch parties. Going into the election, other pundits from CQ Politics, The Cook Report, and the Rothenberg Report also ranked it as 'Lean Democrat' to 'Democrat Favored'.

In May 2008, and again on June 20, 2008, The Washington Post's Chris Cillizza, author of "The Fix", ranked the race in the 25th as a near-certainty to result in a Democratic takeover. Although Walsh had held the seat without serious difficulty until his near-defeat in 2006, the 25th had swung heavily to the Democrats at most other levels since the 1990s. Even though Republicans have a small plurality of registered voters, it hadn't supported a Republican for president since George H. W. Bush carried it in 1988.

On November 4, 2008, Maffei defeated Sweetland, 55% to 42%. He became the first Democrat to represent the area since 1981 (when it was the 32nd District), and only the second Democrat to represent the Syracuse area in Congress since 1917.

2010

Republican Ann Marie Buerkle narrowly defeated Maffei on November 2, 2010 following weeks of absentee ballot counting and precinct recanvassing, in which Buerkle emerged with a 567-vote majority of over 200,000 ballots cast. Maffei conceded the race on November 23, 2010, when it became clear that challenged votes would not change the outcome of the race.

Maffei had been favored to hold the seat. RealClearPolitics rated the district as 'Leans Democratic,' and other pundits from CQ Politics, The Cook Report, and the Rothenberg Report ranked it as 'Lean Democrat' to 'Democrat Favored'.

2012

On August 24, 2011, Maffei announced his intentions to take back his old seat, now renumbered as New York's 24th congressional district. Maffei defeated Buerkle on November 6, 2012, 49% to 43% with 99% of precincts reporting. Despite the race being called in Maffei's favor before midnight on Election Day, Buerkle released a statement the following morning, November 7, saying she would not concede until all ballots were counted. Buerkle conceded the race on November 9, 2012.

2014

Maffei ran for a third, non-consecutive term in 2014. Republicans targeted his seat, along with several others in New York. He was unopposed in the Democratic primary, and faced Republican candidate John Katko, a former federal prosecutor, in the general election. Maffei lost to Katko by a margin of 19 percentage points, winning only 40% of the vote to Katko's 60%. This was the largest margin of defeat for an incumbent House member in 2014.

=== Committee assignments ===
- Committee on Armed Services
  - Subcommittee on Tactical Air and Land Forces
  - Subcommittee on Intelligence, Emerging Threats and Capabilities
- Committee on Science, Space and Technology
  - Subcommittee on Oversight (Ranking Member)
  - Subcommittee on Space

==== Past ====
- Committee on Financial Services (2009–2011)
- Committee on the Judiciary (2009–2011)

== Academic career (2011–2012) ==
He has been a frequent guest lecturer at Syracuse University's Maxwell School of Citizenship and Public Affairs and the S.I. Newhouse School of Public Communications. In fall 2011 and spring 2012, he was a visiting professor of environmental studies at SUNY-ESF, where he taught a graduate seminar on the "Politics of Science and Environmental Policy". Maffei is on the board of advisors of the Global Panel Foundation, a prominent non-partisan NGO which works behind the scenes in conflict areas around the world.

== Electoral history ==
US House election, 2014: New York District 24, 99.67% reporting
Party	Candidate	Votes	%	±%
Republican	John Katko	112,469	59.9	+16.6
Democratic	Dan Maffei	75,286	40.1	−7.6
Majority		37,183	19.8	+14.4
Turnout		187,755	100	−30.2

US House election, 2012: New York District 24, 99% reporting
Party	Candidate	Votes	%	±%
Democratic	Dan Maffei	131,242	48.7	−1.1
Republican	Ann Marie Buerkle	116,641	43.3	−6.9
Green	Ursula Rozum	21,413	8.0	+8.0
Majority		14,601	5.4	+5.0
Turnout		269,296	100	+29.4

US House election, 2010: New York District 25
Party	Candidate	Votes	%	±%
Republican	Ann Marie Buerkle	104,374	50.2	+8.0
Democratic	Dan Maffei	103,807	49.8	−4.7
Majority		567	0.4	−10.4
Turnout		208,181	100	+23.4

US House election, 2008: New York District 25
Party	Candidate	Votes	%	±%
Democratic	Dan Maffei	146,411	54.5	+5.3
Republican	Dale Sweetland	113,358	42.2	−7.0
Green	Howie Hawkins	8,855	3.3	+3.3
Majority		33,053	12.3	+10.7
Turnout		268,624	100	−22.5

US House election, 2006: New York District 25
Party	Candidate	Votes	%	±%
Republican	James T. Walsh (incumbent)	110,525	50.8	−39.6
Democratic	Dan Maffei	107,108	49.2	+49.2
Majority		3,417	1.6	−79.2
Turnout		217,633	100	+4.0

== See also ==
- Michael A. Khouri
- Louis E. Sola
- Rebecca F. Dye

U.S. House of Representatives
Preceded by James Walsh	Member of the U.S. House of Representatives from New York's 25th congressional district 2009–2011	Succeeded by Ann Marie Buerkle
Preceded by Richard Hanna	Member of the U.S. House of Representatives from New York's 24th congressional district 2013–2015	Succeeded by John Katko
U.S. order of precedence (ceremonial)
Preceded by John Hall as Former U.S. Representative	Order of precedence of the United States as Former U.S. Representative	Succeeded by Michael Grimm as Former U.S. Representative
