= Jamal Sowell =

Former Secretary of Commerce for the State of Florida

Jamal Allen Sowell is an American business executive in the state of Florida, named by Florida Trend as one of the state’s 500 most influential business leaders. He served as the Florida Secretary of Commerce and as the Chief Executive Officer of Enterprise Florida, Inc. (EFI), the state's primary economic development agency. During the COVID-19 pandemic, Sowell was responsible for implementing the state’s economic development strategy throughout a tumultuous nationwide economic downturn. The DeSantis Administration called Sowell's efforts to support the state's recovery, "indispensable" in making Florida "the beacon of opportunity for the entire country." In recognizing Sowell, the administration stated, "He has done outstanding work as the president and CEO of Enterprise Florida since January 2019, leading EFI through the once-in-a-generation economic challenges of the COVID-19 pandemic." Sowell resigned as Secretary of Commerce near the end of 2021 to attend military training for the United States Navy Reserve.

== Early life and education ==
Jamal Sowell is a sixth generation Florida native born in Orlando, Florida to James and Lutricia Sowell. Sowell's parents met at Florida A&M University (FAMU) where his father was the class of 1968 Army ROTC distinguished military graduate. Sowell's grandfather fought in World War II, while his father served in Vietnam, and brother deployed to Iraq where he became disabled. Sowell's father was one of Florida's first 100 African-American attorneys.

Sowell was raised in the Pine Hills neighborhood of Orlando, Florida. He attended Dr. Phillips High School before transferring to West Oaks Academy, a small Christian school. His Uncle is Commodores Founder Thomas McClary, and his cousin is Michigan Supreme Court Justice Kurtis Wilder.

Sowell attended the University of Florida, where he became Student Body President and a member of the University Board of Trustees. Sowell graduated with a Bachelor of Arts degree in religion in 2005, with a minor in Family, Youth and Community Sciences. He was awarded the UF Outstanding Male Leader Award, inducted into the UF Hall of Fame, and received the UF Outstanding Young Alumni Award.

Sowell earned a Master's of Higher Education Administration & Policy from the University of Massachusetts Amherst and a Juris Doctor and a certificate in constitutional design from Indiana University Bloomington Maurer School of Law. Sowell was a Historically Black College and University Fellow with the Higher Education Leadership Foundation. At Indiana University Bloomington, Sowell was a Pat Tillman Scholar. While pursuing his degree in law, Sowell interned for Congressman Todd Young and lived in Israel and worked for Shurat HaDin, a non-governmental organization in Israel dedicated to fighting terrorist organizations through legal action. Sowell was selected to be an editor for the Harvard Journal of Law and Public Policy Symposium and was also appointed to a state board regulating health facility administrators by Indiana Governor Mike Pence.

== Military service ==
While in graduate school, Sowell enlisted in the United States Marine Corps Reserve as a Private First Class. After completing graduate school, he went to active duty and became an officer. He served in Operation Enduring Freedom in 2010 during one of the deadliest years for troops in Afghanistan. Sowell is in the United States Navy Reserve.

== Career ==
Sowell served as the special assistant to University of Florida President Bernie Machen, where he was a member of the president's cabinet and served as assistant corporate secretary for the university.

Sowell was selected by Port Tampa Bay President and CEO Paul Anderson as the served as Chief of Staff for Port Tampa Bay. During his time in Tampa Bay, Sowell was appointed by the Pinellas County Commission to the Pinellas County Economic Development Council to help develop programs for economic development and trade opportunities for the Tampa Bay community. In 2018, Port Tampa Bay identified Sowell as a member of the Pinellas County Urban League. During this time, Governor-elect Ron DeSantis selected Sowell to be on the transition advisory committee on the economy composed of Florida's most recognized experts to help the Governor-elect shape the future of Florida's economy.

Sowell was selected by Governor Ron DeSantis of Florida to serve as the state's Secretary of Commerce and CEO of Enterprise Florida, Inc. (EFI). Enterprise Florida is a public private partnership which replaced Florida's former department of commerce with a private sector Board of Directors to direct economic development efforts throughout the state. Sowell oversaw the 3 statewide offices and 14 international offices. Under Sowell's leadership, Enterprise Florida led the relocation or expansion of companies like Dun & Bradstreet, The Boeing Company, Citigroup, Pfizer, The Blackstone Group, Goldman-Sachs, Ark Invest, and many more in the Sunshine State.

During Sowell's tenure, the organization organized the largest trade mission to Israel in the state's history on behalf of the Governor. The goal of the mission was to strengthen ties between Florida and the State of Israel. The Florida delegation met with Prime Minister Benjamin Netanyahu, and two Israeli Cabinet members, the Minister of Science, Ofir Akunis, and the Minister of Strategic Affairs, Gilad Erdan, to discuss ways to strengthen relations between Florida and Israel in a variety of areas including space technologies, cybersecurity, emergency management, increasing trade, and investments. They also met with executives from EL AL airlines. This mission was a natural continuation for Sowell because of his time working in Israel and experience in college advocating for the U.S.-Israel relationship.

Sowell led Enterprise Florida, Inc. (EFI) throughout the COVID-19 pandemic. Sowell assisted the administration in leading EFI through the national recession as the Governor led Florida's remarkable economic recovery. Sowell served on the Governor's "Re-Open Florida Task Force" executive committee. The Governor lauded Sowell's leadership of Enterprise Florida, stating "I want to thank EFI for keeping Florida top of mind for investors and job creators, assisting existing Florida companies expand globally and maintaining programs that help all Florida businesses succeed."

== Personal life ==
Sowell lives with his wife, a teacher who is a graduate of Alcorn State University and Florida A&M University.In 2024, Florida A&M University reported that Sowell had been a monthly donor to the university for more than a decade. In 2023, DeSantis appointed him to the Florida Defense Support Task Force, a legislatively mandated body whose mission is to enhance Florida’s military missions and installations.
