= Helen Delich Bentley =

American politician (1923–2016)

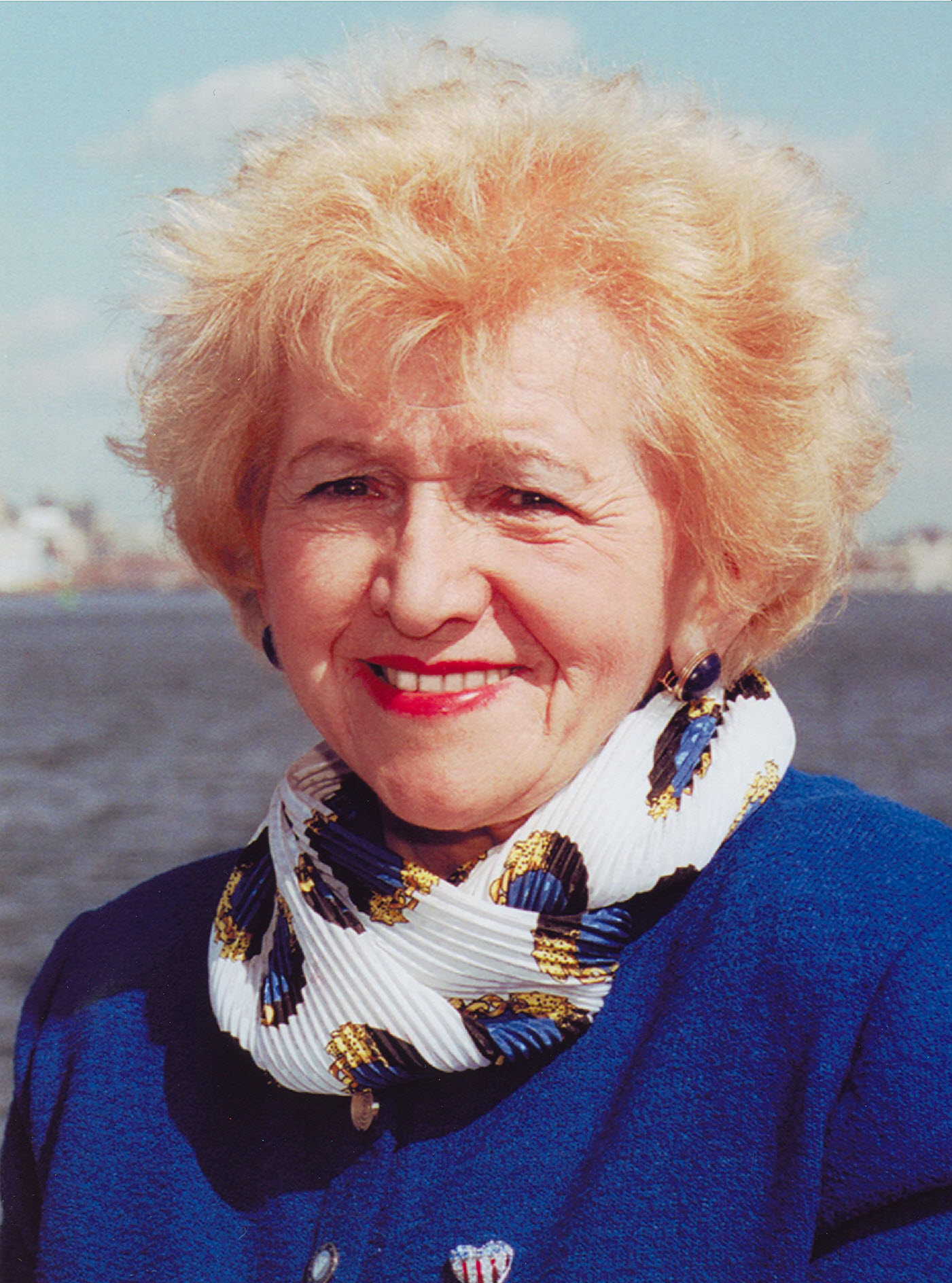

Member of the U.S. House of Representatives from Maryland's 2nd district
- In office January 3, 1985 – January 3, 1995
- Preceded by: Clarence Long
- Succeeded by: Robert Ehrlich

Chairwoman of the Federal Maritime Commission
- In office 1969–1975
- Nominated by: Richard Nixon
- Preceded by: John Harllee
- Succeeded by: Karl Bakke

Personal details
- Born: Helen Delich; November 28, 1923 Ruth, Nevada, U.S.
- Died: August 6, 2016 (aged 92) Timonium, Maryland, U.S.
- Party: Republican
- Spouse: William Roy Bentley (m. 1959; died 2003)
- Education: University of Missouri

Helen Bentley (née Delich; November 28, 1923 – August 6, 2016) was an American politician and journalist who was a Republican member of the United States House of Representatives from Maryland from 1985 to 1995. Before entering politics, she had been a leading maritime reporter and journalist. As Chairwoman of the Federal Maritime Commission, Bentley was the highest ranking woman in the Nixon administration.

== Early life ==
Bentley was born in the copper-mining town of Ruth, Nevada. Her parents were immigrant Serbians, and her father was a miner. When Bentley was eight years old, her father died of silicosis, a common miner's disease, and Bentley took a part-time job in a dress shop while her mother took in boarders to support the family.

While at high school, she had her first experiences of journalism and politics while working on the weekly newspaper of Ely, Nevada, which was published by Republican state legislator Charles Russell. She won scholarships to study journalism at the University of Missouri, graduating in 1944 after earning a BA degree with honors. While at college, she worked on the successful U.S. Senate campaign of Nevada Democrat James G. Scrugham, and was appointed his Senate secretary.

== Career ==
=== Journalism ===
After she graduated, Bentley worked for small-town newspapers in Fort Wayne, Indiana, and Lewiston, Idaho, but she wanted to report hard news for a larger publication; at the time, most female journalists were limited to writing society news. She wrote to all the main East Coast newspapers and, in 1945, The Baltimore Sun offered her a reporting position. She initially reported on labor and union matters, but was subsequently allocated maritime and waterfront news, a significant beat in a city and state whose port contributed heavily to the economy. She became a widely respected maritime reporter, dealing with people from dock workers to state politicians, and also writing for port agencies and shipping companies.

Beginning in 1950, Bentley hosted a local Baltimore TV program on WMAR, The Port That Built a City, presenting maritime and transportation-related news. Later retitled The Port That Built a City and State, the series was produced by Bentley until 1965 and included then-novel live remotes from the decks of ships in Baltimore harbor during the early years of television.

During the Vietnam War, Bentley became aware of the congestion in the port of Saigon, and traveled there to report on the problems of supplying American troops. President Johnson became aware of her report, and subsequently improvements were made to port facilities in Cam Ranh Bay to relieve pressure on Saigon.

== Politics ==
In 1969, Bentley was offered a seat on the Federal Maritime Commission. She declined and asked for the position of chair instead. She was appointed and chaired the commission from 1969 to 1975. The position made her the highest-ranking woman in President Nixon's administration. During her tenure, Bentley advocated for federal support for American shipbuilding yards.

=== Congress ===
Bentley challenged Democratic incumbent Clarence Long in Maryland's 2nd congressional district in 1980 and 1982. She defeated Long on her third attempt in 1984, and was elected to the 99th Congress and to the four succeeding Congresses, serving from January 3, 1985, to January 3, 1995.

During her time in office, Bentley advocated for protectionist trade policies to support U.S. manufacturing and the U.S. Merchant Marine fleet. She also introduced legislation that enabled the Chesapeake Bay to be dredged, allowing larger cargo ships to use the port of Baltimore. In the 1990s, she was sympathetic towards Serbians during the civil war in Yugoslavia, and opposed U.S. military involvement in that conflict.

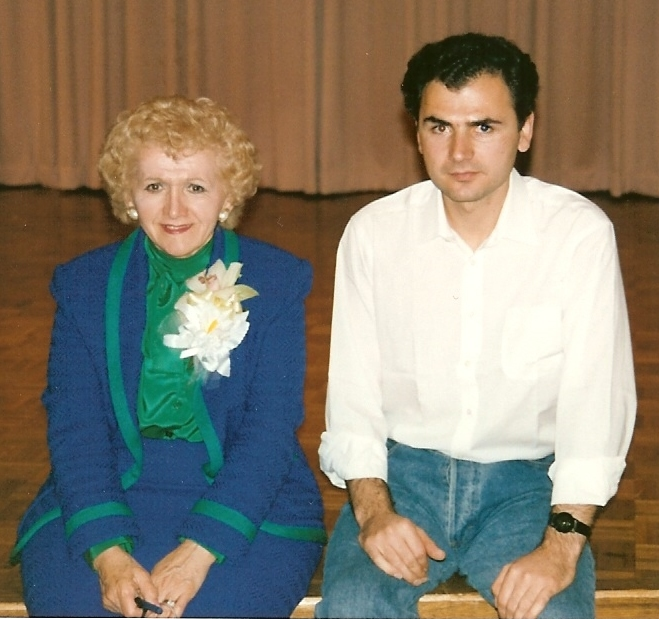
Helen Delich Bentley with Serbian poet and journalist Dejan Stojanović in 1993

In 1994, Bentley declined to run for reelection to the 104th Congress, choosing instead to seek the GOP nomination for governor of Maryland. Despite an endorsement from the incumbent governor, Democrat William Donald Schaefer, she was defeated in the Republican primary by the more conservative Ellen Sauerbrey.

=== Post-Congress campaigns ===
When Bentley's successor in Congress, Bob Ehrlich, gave up his seat, she sought to retake the seat in 2002. Redistricting had made the district significantly more Democratic by adding a large slice of Baltimore proper, which Bentley had never represented. She lost to Baltimore County Executive Dutch Ruppersberger.

=== Later career ===
In 1995, Bentley founded Helen Bentley & Associates, Inc., and provided consultancy services on international trade, business and government. She also served as a consultant for the Maryland Port Administration and the Port of Baltimore and served on the Board of Trustees for the Baltimore Museum of Industry and the Maritime Industries Academy High School.

=== Electoral record ===
Election results
Year	Office	Election	Candidate	Party	Votes	%	Opponent	Party	Votes	%	Opponent	Party	Votes	%
1980	Representative for Maryland's 2nd District	General	Helen Delich Bentley	Republican	89,961	42.6%	Clarence Long	Democratic	121,017	57.4%				
1982	Representative for Maryland's 2nd District	General	Helen Delich Bentley	Republican	75,062	47.4%	Clarence Long	Democratic	83,318	52.6%				
1984	Representative for Maryland's 2nd District	General	Helen Delich Bentley	Republican	111,517	51.4%	Clarence Long	Democratic	105,571	48.6%	N/A	Other	1	0.0%
1986	Representative for Maryland's 2nd District	General	Helen Delich Bentley	Republican	96,745	58.7%	Kathleen Kennedy Townsend	Democratic	68,200	41.3%	N/A	Write-in	1	0.0%
1988	Representative for Maryland's 2nd District	General	Helen Delich Bentley	Republican	157,956	71.5%	Joseph Bartenfelder	Democratic	63,114	28.5%				
1990	Representative for Maryland's 2nd District	General	Helen Delich Bentley	Republican	115,398	74.4%	Ronald P. Bowers	Democratic	39,785	25.6%				
1992	Representative for Maryland's 2nd District	General	Helen Delich Bentley	Republican	165,443	65.1%	Michael Hickey Jr.	Democratic	88,658	34.9%				
1994	Governor of Maryland	Republican Primary	Helen Delich Bentley	Republican	89,821	37.9%	Ellen Sauerbrey	Republican	123,676	52.2%	William S. Shepard	Republican	23,505	9.9%
2002	Representative for Maryland's 2nd District	General	Helen Delich Bentley	Republican	88,954	45.7%	Dutch Ruppersberger	Democratic	105,718	54.3%				

=== Recognition ===
In 2004, Bentley was inducted into the International Maritime Hall of Fame. In 2006, as part of the Port of Baltimore's 300th anniversary celebrations, the port was renamed the Helen Delich Bentley Port of Baltimore.

Bentley was also inducted into the Maryland Women's Hall of Fame, and was a recipient of the Speaker's Medallion, First Citizen Award, and Governor's International Leadership Award from the state government of Maryland.

== Personal life and death ==
Bentley was married to William Roy Bentley, who died in 2003 from a stroke. The couple had no children.

She died of brain cancer in August 2016 at the age of 92, at her home in Timonium, Maryland.

== See also ==
- Women in the United States House of Representatives

U.S. House of Representatives
Preceded by Clarence Long	Member of the U.S. House of Representatives from Maryland's 2nd congressional district 1985–1995	Succeeded by Robert Ehrlich
