= Frederick D Sancilio =

Frederick D. Sancilio
- Born: Frederick Dominick Sancilio
- Education: Rutgers University
- Known for: Alcami (formerly aaiPharma), Endeavor Pharmaceuticals, Sancilio Pharmaceuticals
- Spouse: Alex Sancilio
- Awards: Ernst & Young Entrepreneur of the Year Award (1997)
- Scientific career
- Fields: Medicinal chemistry

Frederick D. Sancilio is an American pharmaceutical scientist, research professor and serial entrepreneur best known for founding several biotechnology and contract research organizations including, Alcami (formerly aaiPharma), Endeavor Pharmaceuticals, Clearway Global, Omega Blu Supplements and Sancilio Pharmaceuticals. Sancilio has participated in the development of more than 40 drug product patents that have been granted by the United States Patent and Trademark Office.

== Early life and education ==
Sancilio was born to Joseph and Lina Sancilio. Sancilio attended Rutgers the State University of New Jersey where he earned his Bachelors, Masters and Doctor of Philosophy degrees in chemistry.

== Career ==
Sancilio began his pharmaceutical research career in 1969 during his undergraduate studies at Rutgers University where he worked with Dr. Al Steyermark who was a visiting professor, and former assistant to the president of Hoffman-LaRoche. Sancilio held several positions in notable pharmaceutical companies such as GSK plc (formerly Burroughs-Wellcome), Schering-Plough, and Hoffmann-LaRoche.

In 1979, Sancilio founded his first company, Applied Analytical Industries (AAI) in Greenville, North Carolina. AAI was the first American non-clinical contract research organization to offer laboratory services to pharmaceutical companies. In 1980, the company's Laboratory operations were moved to Wilmington, North Carolina.

In 1996, AAI went public and rebranded to aaiPharma before Sancilio's retirement in 2002 who served as the CEO of the company for 25 years. In 2006, 4 years after Sancilio's retirement, aaiPharma filed for Chapter 11 bankruptcy and emerged as a private company after the reorganization plan was approved by the US Bankruptcy Court.

aaiPharma went from a public to a private company when it was acquired by affiliates of The Carlyle Group and Hellman & Friedman in 2011. In 2013, aaiPharma merged with Cambridge Major Laboratories to offer analytical testing and development services for active pharmaceutical ingredients (APIs). The merged company was renamed Alcami in 2016.

In 1994, Sancilio founded Endeavor Pharmaceuticals and became its first Chief Executive Officer, it was founded as a joint venture between aaiPharma and Schering Berlin Venture. As of 2000, Endeavor's investor base included, Goldman, Sachs & Co, Noro-Moseley Partners, the Wakefield Group, and Schering Berlin Venture. In 2003, it was acquired by the drug manufacturer Barr Laboratories for $35 million.

In 2005, Sancilio founded the biopharmaceutical research and manufacturing company, Sancilio & Company (Sancilio Pharmaceuticals) with investment capital from the City of Jupiter and the City of Palm Beach Gardens, along with funding from Enterprise Florida. In 2015, Sancilio filed for an IPO of $86.3 million but he filed for an IPO withdrawal in September 2016 announcing that the company does not intend to pursue an IPO at this time. In 2017, the Company experienced a change of control and Sancilio resigned. The company filed for bankruptcy in 2018 and was eventually sold. In 2019, it was renamed to Micelle Biopharma.

== Publications ==
Sancilio is the author or co-author of numerous publications and books including:

=== Articles ===
- Lopez-Toledano, Miguel A.; Saxena, Vaibhav; Legassie, Jason D.; Liu, Haiyang; Ghanta, Ajay; Riseman, Stephen; Cocilova, Courtney; Daak, Ahmed; Thorsteinsson, Thorsteinn; Rabinowicz, Adrian L.; Sancilio, Frederick D. (2019-07-08). "Advanced Lipid Technologies (ALT): A Proven Formulation Platform to Enhance the Bioavailability of Lipophilic Compounds". Journal of Drug Delivery. 2019: 1–10. doi:10.1155/2019/1957360. ISSN 2090-3014. PMC 6644232. PMID 31360551.
- Wu, Celeste Y.C.; Lopez-Toledano, Miguel A.; Daak, Ahmed A.; Clemons, Garrett A.; Citadin, Cristiane T.; Sancilio, Frederick D.; Rabinowicz, Adrian L.; Minagar, Alireza; Neumann, Jake T.; Lee, Reggie H.C.; Lin, Hung Wen (2020). "SC411 treatment can enhance survival in a mouse model of sickle cell disease". Prostaglandins, Leukotrienes and Essential Fatty Acids. 158 102110. doi:10.1016/j.plefa.2020.102110. PMID 32447175.
- Lopez-Toledano, Miguel; Daak, Ahmed; Thorsteinsson, Thorsteinn; Sancilio, Frederick; Rabinowicz, Adrian (2017). "Triglyceride-Lowering Effect of Omega-3 Fatty Acid Ethyl Esters Using Advanced Lipid Technologiestm (ALT) formulations Under Fasting Conditions". Journal of Clinical Lipidology. 11 (3): 828–829. doi:10.1016/j.jacl.2017.04.093.
- Lopez-Toledano, Miguel; Thorsteinsson, Thorsteinn; Daak, Ahmed; Maki, Kevin; Johns, Colleen; Rabinowicz, Adrian; Sancilio, Frederick (2017). "A Novel Omega-3-Acid Ethyl Ester formulation Incorporating Advanced Lipid Technologies (ALT) Improves DHA and EPA bioavailability compared with Lovaza". Journal of Clinical Lipidology. 11 (3): 829–830. doi:10.1016/j.jacl.2017.04.095.
- Maki, Kevin C.; Johns, Colleen; Harris, William S.; Puder, Mark; Freedman, Steven D.; Thorsteinsson, Thorsteinn; Daak, Ahmed; Rabinowicz, Adrian L.; Sancilio, Frederick D. (2017). "Bioequivalence Demonstration for Ω-3 Acid Ethyl Ester Formulations: Rationale for Modification of Current Guidance". Clinical Therapeutics. 39 (3): 652–658. doi:10.1016/j.clinthera.2017.01.019. PMID 28189365.
- Lopez-Toledano, Miguel A.; Thorsteinsson, Thorsteinn; Daak, Ahmed; Maki, Kevin C.; Johns, Colleen; Rabinowicz, Adrian L.; Sancilio, Frederick D. (2017). "A Novel ω-3 Acid Ethyl Ester Formulation Incorporating Advanced Lipid Technologies TM (ALT) Improves Docosahexaenoic Acid and Eicosapentaenoic Acid Bioavailability Compared with Lovaza". Clinical Therapeutics. 39 (3): 581–591. doi:10.1016/j.clinthera.2017.01.020. PMID 28189364.
- Daak, Ahmed; Lopez-Toledano, Miguel; Thorsteinsson, Thorsteinn; Maki, Kevin; Johns, Colleen; Rabinowicz, Adrian; Sancilio, Frederick (2017). "Minimal Food Effect for Eicosapentaenoic Acid and Docosahexaenoic Acid Bioavailability from Omega-3 Acid Ethyl Esters with an ALT based formulation". Journal of Clinical Lipidology. 11 (3): 829. doi:10.1016/j.jacl.2017.04.094.
- Lopez-Toledano, Miguel A.; Thorsteinsson, Thorsteinn; Daak, Ahmed A.; Maki, Kevin C.; Johns, Colleen; Rabinowicz, Adrian L.; Sancilio, Frederick D. (2017). "Minimal food effect for eicosapentaenoic acid and docosahexaenoic acid bioavailability from omega-3–acid ethyl esters with an Advanced Lipid Technologies TM (ALT)–based formulation". Journal of Clinical Lipidology. 11 (2): 394–405. doi:10.1016/j.jacl.2017.01.017. PMID 28502496.
- Murray, Jackelyn; Bergeron, Harrison C.; Jones, Les P.; Reener, Zachary Beau; Martin, David E.; Sancilio, Fred D.; Tripp, Ralph A. (2022-04-27). "Probenecid Inhibits Respiratory Syncytial Virus (RSV) Replication". Viruses. 14 (5): 912. doi:10.3390/v14050912. ISSN 1999-4915. PMC 9147281. PMID 35632652.
- Murray, Jackelyn; Martin, David E.; Sancilio, Fred D.; Tripp, Ralph A. (2023-11-30). "Antiviral Activity of Probenecid and Oseltamivir on Influenza Virus Replication". Viruses. 15 (12): 2366. doi:10.3390/v15122366. ISSN 1999-4915. PMC 10748304. PMID 38140606.
- Martin, David E.; Pandey, Neelam; Chavda, Purvi; Singh, Gurpreet; Sutariya, Rakesh; Sancilio, Frederic; Tripp, Ralph A. (2023-07-06). "Oral Probenecid for Nonhospitalized Adults with Symptomatic Mild-to-Moderate COVID-19". Viruses. 15 (7): 1508. doi:10.3390/v15071508. ISSN 1999-4915. PMC 10386418. PMID 37515194.

=== Book ===
- Sancilio, Frederick D. (2015-06-02). Prevention Is the Cure!. Morgan James Pub. ISBN 978-1-63047-425-6.
