= Richard J. Daschbach =

American politician (1936–2023)

Commissioner of the Federal Maritime Commission
- In office August 1977 – October 1982
- President: Jimmy Carter; Ronald Reagan
- Preceded by: Ashton Barrett

Member of the New Hampshire House of Representatives from the Cheshire 2nd district
- In office 1986–1988

Personal details
- Born: November 19, 1936 Columbus, Ohio, U.S.
- Died: December 5, 2023 (aged 87)
- Party: Democratic
- Education: Loyola University; Georgetown University; Georgetown University Law Center

Richard J. Daschbach (November 19, 1936 – December 5, 2023) was an American politician. He served as a member for the Cheshire 2nd district of the New Hampshire House of Representatives.

== Life and career ==
Daschbach was born in Columbus, Ohio. He attended Loyola University, Georgetown University and Georgetown University Law Center.

In 1977, President Jimmy Carter nominated Daschbach to serve as a commissioner of the Federal Maritime Commission, succeeding Ashton Barrett. He served until 1982.

Daschbach served in the New Hampshire House of Representatives from 1986 to 1988.

Daschbach died on December 5, 2023, at the age of 87.
