= Carl Bentzel =

American attorney

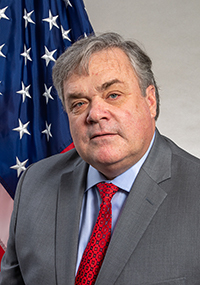

Commissioner of the Federal Maritime Commission
- In office December 9, 2019 – December 13, 2024
- President: Donald Trump; Joe Biden
- Preceded by: Mario Cordero
- Succeeded by: Robert Harvey

Personal details
- Born: Carl Whitney Bentzel
- Party: Democratic
- Education: St. Lawrence University (BA); University of Alabama (JD); Tulane University (LLM)

Carl Whitney Bentzel is an American attorney and political advisor who served as a commissioner of the Federal Maritime Commission. Nominated by President Donald Trump on November 21, 2019, he was sworn in on December 9, 2019.

== Education ==
Bentzel earned a Bachelor of Arts degree from St. Lawrence University, a Juris Doctor from the University of Alabama School of Law, and a Master of Laws from the Tulane Admiralty Law Institute at Tulane University Law School.

== Career ==
Prior to serving on the Federal Maritime Commission, Bentzel was a professional staffer in both chambers of the United States Congress. He was the senior Democratic counsel to the United States Senate Committee on Commerce, Science, and Transportation after serving as the maritime policy counsel to the United States House Committee on Merchant Marine and Fisheries.

Bentzel worked as the vice president at DCI Group, a public relations firm. He also established his own consulting services company, Bentzel Strategies LLC. Bentzel was nominated by President Donald Trump to serve as a commissioner of the Federal Maritime Commission on November 21, 2019. He was sworn in on December 9, 2019. He resigned in December 2024.
