= William P. Doyle =

American politician

William Doyle
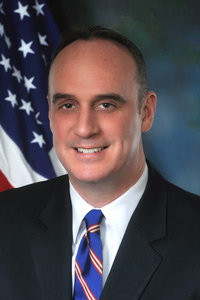

Commissioner of the Federal Maritime Commission
- In office January 1, 2013 – January 2, 2018
- President: Barack Obama; Donald Trump
- Preceded by: Joseph E. Brennan
- Succeeded by: Louis E. Sola

Personal details
- Born: Boston, Massachusetts
- Education: Massachusetts Maritime Academy

William P. Doyle is a former commissioner of the Federal Maritime Commission. He was unanimously confirmed by the U.S. Senate in 2013 and 2015 after being nominated twice by President Barack Obama. He stayed on with the commission under the administration of Donald Trump during the first year of Trump's term. In January 2018, Doyle became the chief executive officer and executive director of the Dredging Contractors of America. Doyle served as the executive director of the Maryland Port Administration from July 2020 to June 2023.

== Early life ==
Doyle was born in Boston, Massachusetts and raised in Weymouth. He is a 1992 graduate of the Massachusetts Maritime Academy, where he earned a Bachelor of Science in Marine Engineering. During Operations Desert Shield and Desert Storm he worked in a shipyard breaking out vessels. After graduation from the Massachusetts Maritime Academy he served as an officer in the U.S. Merchant Marine from 1992 to 2002. He is a 2000 graduate of Widener University Commonwealth Law School.

== Family life ==
Doyle resides in York, Pennsylvania. He has two daughters and a son. His wife is Amy Wolfson Doyle, an attorney.

== Career ==
In 2008 and until 2011, Doyle was appointed as the director of permits, scheduling and compliance for the Office of Federal Coordinator for Alaska Natural Gas Transportation Projects under the George W. Bush administration. In 2013, the United States Senate confirmed President Barack Obama's nomination of Doyle as a commissioner of the Federal Maritime Commission. In 2015, Doyle was unanimously confirmed by the Senate to a second term.

Doyle departed the Federal Maritime Commission in 2018 to become CEO and executive director of the Dredging Contractors of America.

On July 22, 2020, Doyle was appointed by Maryland governor Larry Hogan as the executive director of the Maryland Port Administration where he served as the chief executive of the Helen Delich Bentley Port of Baltimore.

In November 2022, U.S. transportation secretary Pete Buttigieg appointed Doyle to the federal Maritime Transportation System National Advisory Committee.

He abruptly resigned on June 16, 2023, three days after being involved in a four-vehicle crash in a state-issued vehicle for which police cited him with three offenses. On June 19, 2023, the board of directors of the Dredging Contactors of America unanimously voted to rehire Doyle as CEO and executive director, effective immediately.
