= A. Paul Anderson =

American maritime executive and former federal official

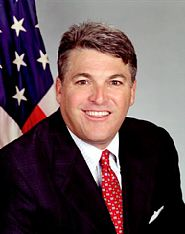

Former Commissioner of the Federal Maritime Commission
- In office August 22, 2003 – May 30, 2008
- President: George W. Bush
- Preceded by: Delmond J. H. Won
- Succeeded by: Richard A. Lidinsky Jr.

Personal details
- Education: University of Florida (BS); Harvard Kennedy School (executive education)

Alan Paul Anderson is an American maritime executive and former federal government official who has served as president and chief executive officer of Port Tampa Bay since January 2013. Previously, he served as chief executive officer of the Jacksonville Port Authority and as a commissioner and chairman of the Federal Maritime Commission.

== Career ==
Anderson held positions in the maritime transportation and private business sectors before entering federal government service. He served as director of public affairs at Port Everglades and held a public affairs position with Hvide Marine Inc. He later served as vice president of government relations and public affairs at JM Family Enterprises.

=== Federal Maritime Commission ===
Anderson was nominated by President George W. Bush to the Federal Maritime Commission on April 11, 2003. He received a recess appointment on August 22, 2003, and was confirmed by the United States Senate on May 5, 2004. He was sworn in on June 30, 2004.

In 2007, President Bush designated Anderson chairman of the Federal Maritime Commission. His service on the commission ended in May 2008.

=== Jacksonville Port Authority ===
In December 2010, Anderson was selected to lead the Jacksonville Port Authority (JAXPORT). He served as chief executive officer until December 2012, when he resigned to become president and CEO of the Tampa Port Authority.

=== Port Tampa Bay ===
Anderson became president and chief executive officer of the Tampa Port Authority, now known as Port Tampa Bay, in January 2013.

During his tenure, the port has pursued cargo capacity expansion and infrastructure development projects.

A 2024 economic impact study prepared by Martin Associates estimated that Port Tampa Bay generated $34.6 billion in annual regional economic activity and supported more than 192,000 jobs. The study measured port activity during calendar year 2023.

== Industry leadership and public service ==
Anderson has held leadership positions in maritime transportation and trade organizations. In May 2023, he was elected chairman of the American Association of Port Authorities. He has also served as chairman of the Florida Ports Council and the Florida Seaport Transportation and Economic Development Council.

Anderson served as chairman of the Coalition for America's Gateways and Trade Corridors. In 2025, he became the organization's immediate past chairman after completing a three-year term.

On June 30, 2026, Anderson was appointed to the United States Department of Transportation's Advisory Committee on Human Trafficking, representing the port sector.

== Education ==
Anderson graduated from the University of Florida in 1982 with a Bachelor of Science degree. He completed the Senior Managers in Government executive education program at Harvard Kennedy School in 1997.
