= Clarence Long =

American economist and politician

Clarence "Doc" Long
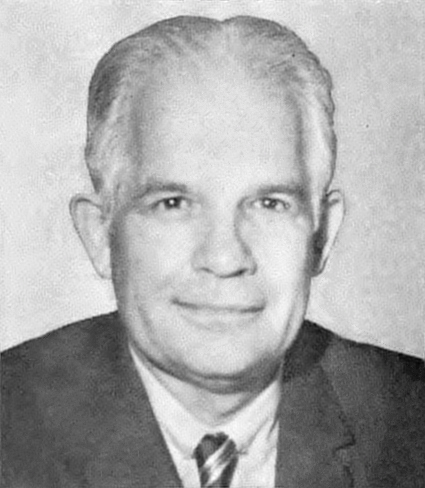

Member of the U.S. House of Representatives from Maryland's 2nd district
- In office January 3, 1963 – January 3, 1985
- Preceded by: Daniel Brewster
- Succeeded by: Helen Delich Bentley

Personal details
- Born: Clarence Dickinson Long, Jr. December 11, 1908 South Bend, Indiana, U.S.
- Died: September 18, 1994 (aged 85) Cockeysville, Maryland, U.S.
- Party: Democratic

Military service
- Allegiance: United States
- Branch/service: United States Navy
- Battles/wars: World War II

Clarence Dickinson "Doc" Long Jr. (December 11, 1908 – September 18, 1994) was a liberal Democratic U.S. Congressman who represented the 2nd congressional district of Maryland from January 3, 1963, to January 3, 1985.

Long was born in South Bend, Indiana. He received his bachelor's degree from Washington and Jefferson College in 1932, and his master's degree and Ph.D. in economics from Princeton University in 1935 and 1938, respectively. His doctoral dissertation was titled "Long cycles in the building industry business, public, and residential building in United States cities, 1856-1935." He also served in the United States Navy during World War II. He was a former member of the United States Council of Economic Advisers to the President (1953–54 and 1956–57) and in the 1930s was a professor of economics at Wesleyan University and later Johns Hopkins University (1946–1963). Long voted in favor of the Civil Rights Acts of 1964 and 1968, and the Voting Rights Act of 1965.

Long became Chairman of the subcommittee on Foreign Operations of the House Appropriations Committee. In this role he supervised the foreign aid budget. Long's support for the anti-Soviet Mujahideen was recounted in the film Charlie Wilson's War, in which Long was played by Ned Beatty. Long was defeated for re-election by Republican Helen Delich Bentley in 1984.

U.S. House of Representatives
Preceded by Daniel Brewster	Member of the U.S. House of Representatives from Maryland's 2nd congressional district 1963–1985	Succeeded by Helen Delich Bentley
