= Federal Maritime Commission =

Independent agency of the U.S. government

Agency overview
- Formed: August 12, 1961; 65 years ago
- Jurisdiction: Federal government of the United States
- Headquarters: Washington, DC, US
- Agency executive: Laura DiBella, Chairman
- Website: fmc.gov

The Federal Maritime Commission (FMC) is an independent agency of the United States government that regulates United States ocean-borne transportation and the United States Merchant Marine.

== History ==
The FMC was established as an independent regulatory agency by Reorganization Plan No. 7, effective August 12, 1961. Prior to that time, the United States Federal Maritime Board was responsible for both the regulation of ocean commerce and the promotion of the United States Merchant Marine. Under the reorganization plan, the shipping laws of the U.S. were separated into two categories, regulatory and promotional. The newly created FMC was charged with the administration of the regulatory provisions of the shipping laws, while the promotional role was vested in the Maritime Administration (now part of the U.S. Department of Transportation).

The passage of the Shipping Act of 1984 brought about a major deregulatory change in the regulatory regime facing shipping companies operating in the U.S. foreign commerce. The subsequent passage of the Ocean Shipping Reform Act of 1998, with its further deregulatory amendments and modifications to the Shipping Act of 1984, represented another pro-market shift in shipping regulation. The principal statutes or statutory provisions administered by the Commission are: the Shipping Act of 1984, the Foreign Shipping Practices Act of 1988, section 19 of the Merchant Marine Act, 1920, and Public Law 89-777.

Most of these statutes were amended by the Ocean Shipping Reform Act (OSRA) of 1998, which took effect on May 1, 1999, and the Ocean Shipping Reform Act of 2022.

== Organization ==
The commission is composed of five commissioners, appointed by the President by and with the advice and consent of the Senate. It is a bipartisan commission, so no more than three commissioners may be appointed from the same political party. The term of each commissioner is five years, with one term ending every year on June 30. When the term of a commissioner ends, the commissioner may continue to serve until a successor is appointed and qualified, but for a period not to exceed two years. Commissioners may serve a maximum of three terms. If they were initially appointed to fill a vacancy for an unexpired term, they may serve three terms in addition to that initial partial term. The President designates one of the commissioners as Chairman, who serves as the chief executive and administrative officer of the commission.

=== Current commissioners ===
List of commissioners as of June 1, 2026:

Position	Name	Party	Took office	Term expires
Chair	Laura DiBella	Republican	January 6, 2026	June 30, 2028
Member	Rebecca F. Dye	Republican	November 14, 2002	June 30, 2025
Member	Dan Maffei	Democratic	June 30, 2016	June 30, 2027
Member	Max Vekich	Democratic	February 15, 2022	June 30, 2026
Member	Robert Harvey	Republican	June 1, 2026	June 30, 2029

=== Bureaus and offices ===
List of bureaus and offices:

- Office of Equal Employment Opportunity
- Office of the Inspector General
- Office of the Administrative Law Judges
- Office of Consumer Affairs and Dispute Resolution Services
- Office of the General Counsel
- Office of The Secretary
- Office of the Managing Director
  - Office of Budget and Finance
  - Office of Human Resources
  - Office of Information Technology
  - Office of Management Services
- Bureau of Enforcement
- Bureau of Certification and Licensing
- Bureau of Trade Analysis
- Area Representatives

== Regulations of the FMC ==
Regulations of the FMC are found at 46 C.F.R. Chapter IV.

=== Regulations concerning Ocean Transport Intermediaries ===
==== Definitions ====
The FMC regulations regulate the activities of Ocean Transport Intermediaries (OTIs) in the US. The FMC regulations define OTI to include two classes of logistics service providers: (1) ocean freight forwarders and (2) non-vessel operating common carriers (NVOCCs).

The FMC regulations define "ocean freight forwarder" as a person that (i) in the United States, dispatches shipments from the United States via a common carrier and books or otherwise arranges space for those shipments on behalf of shippers and (ii) processes the documentation or performs related activities incident to those shipments.

The FMC regulations define "NVOCC" as a common carrier that does not operate the vessels by which the ocean transportation is provided, and is a shipper in its relationship with an ocean common carrier.

Licensing requirements

OTIs must be licensed by the FMC before they perform OTI services in the United States. Requirements for licensing are found at 46 CFR §§ 515.11-515.27.

==== Duties ====
The FMC regulations define duties with which OTIs must comply at 46 CFR §§ 515.31-515.34.

==== Fees and compensation ====
The FMC regulations set out certain rules regarding fees that freight forwarders may charge to their customers and compensation that freight forwarders may receive from carriers at 46 CFR §§ 515.41-515.91.

== List of commissioners ==
Portrait	Commissioner	Took office	Left office
	John Harllee	August 1961	June 1969
	Ashton C. Barrett	February 1962	June 1977
	Thomas E. Stakem	February 1962	June 1963
	James V. Day	February 1962	June 1984
	John S. Patterson	February 1962	September 1966
	George H. Hearn	July 1964	June 1978
	James F. Fanseen	March 1967	June 1971
	Helen Delich Bentley	June 1970	June 1975
	Clarence G. Morse	October 1971	June 1976
	Karl E. Bakke	November 1975	June 1977
	Robert R. Casey	January 1976	September 1977
	Richard J. Daschbach	August 1977	October 1982
	Thomas F. Moakley	October 1977	October 1988
	Leslie Kanuk	June 1978	June 1981
	Peter N. Teige	June 1980	September 1981
	Alan Green Jr.	June 1981	June 1985
	James J. Carey	October 1981	June 1990
	Robert Setrakian	May 1983	August 1985
	Edward J. Philbin	March 1985	December 1989
	Frank Ivancie	November 1985	June 1992
	Edward Hickey Jr.	November 1985	January 1988
	Elaine Chao	April 29, 1988	April 19, 1989
	William Hathaway	February 8, 1990	November 11, 1999
	Rob Quartel	April 1990	June 1994
	Ming C. Hsu	June 1990	December 1999
	Chris Koch	October 1990	March 1994
	Joe Scroggins Jr.	June 1994	June 2000
	Delmond J. H. Won	August 1994	August 2003
	Harold J. Creel Jr.	August 17, 1994	June 30, 2009
	John A. Moran	October 21, 1998	April 2002
	Joseph E. Brennan	November 10, 1999	January 1, 2013
	Antony M. Merck	January 2000	December 2001
	Steven R. Blust	August 12, 2002	June 30, 2006
	Rebecca F. Dye	November 14, 2002	present
	A. Paul Anderson	August 22, 2003	May 30, 2008
	Richard A. Lidinsky Jr.	July 31, 2009	April 1, 2013
	Michael Khouri	December 2009	February 15, 2022
	Mario Cordero	June 3, 2011	January 23, 2017
	William P. Doyle	January 1, 2013	January 2, 2018
	Dan Maffei	June 30, 2016	present
	Louis E. Sola	January 23, 2019	June 30, 2025
	Carl Bentzel	December 9, 2019	December 13, 2024
	Max Vekich	February 15, 2022	present
	Laura DiBella	January 6, 2026	present
	Robert Harvey	June 1, 2026	present

Responsibility for U.S. merchant shipping has been held by different federal agencies since 1917. For a history, see United States Shipping Board.
