= James J. Carey =

American Rear Admiral (born 1939)

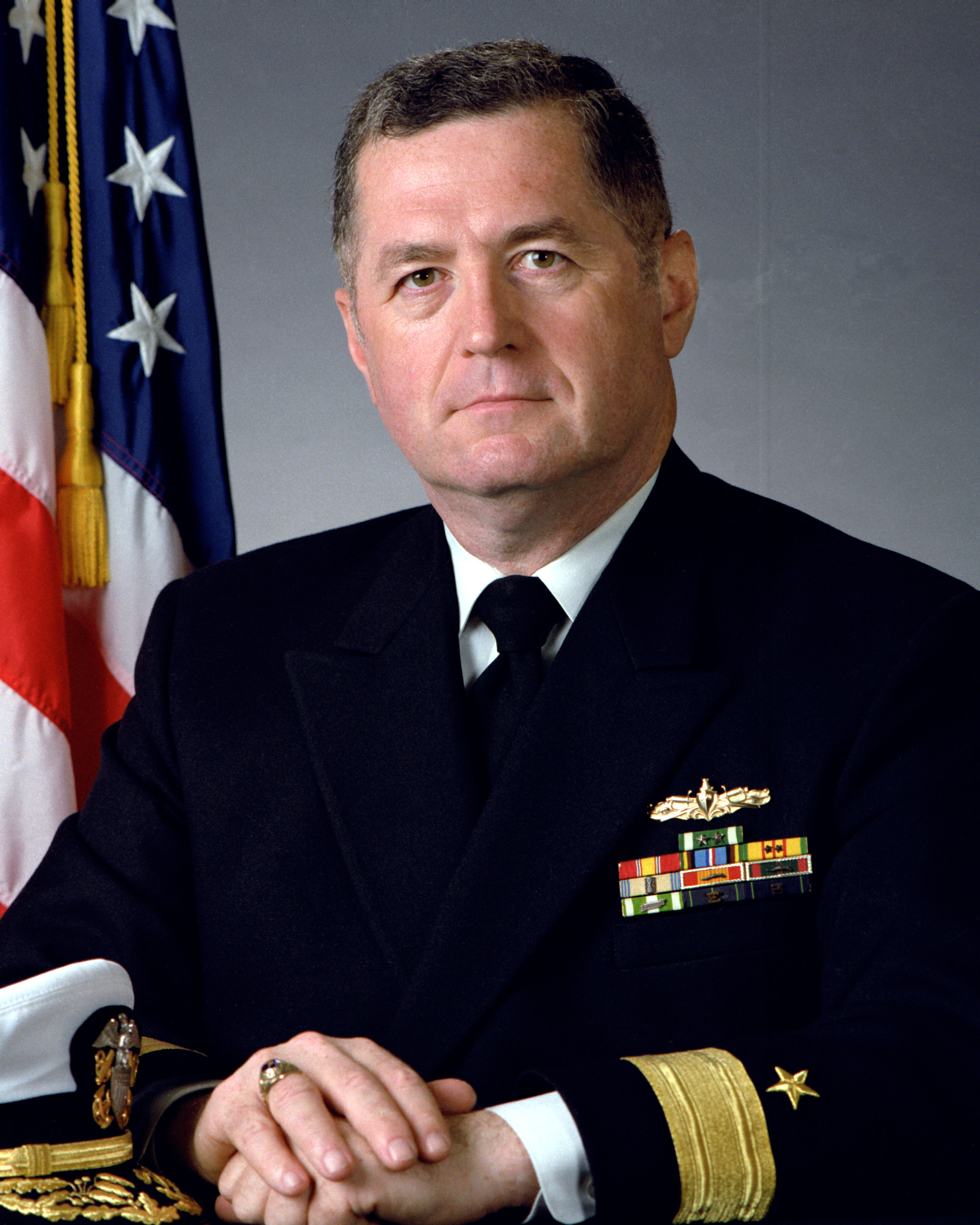
- Rear Adm. Carey in 1988

Chairman of the U. S. Federal Maritime Commission
- In office 1989–1991
- Appointed by: George H. W. Bush

Vice Chairman of the U. S. Federal Maritime Commission
- In office 1983–1989
- Appointed by: Ronald Reagan

Personal details
- Born: 9 April 1939 (age 87) Berlin, Wisconsin, US
- Education: Northwestern University
- Military career
- Allegiance: United States
- Branch: Navy
- Service years: 1962–1994
- Rank: Rear Admiral

James Joseph Carey (born 9 April 1939) is a retired American Rear Admiral, United States Navy served from 1962 to 1994, born and raised in Berlin, Green Lake County, Wisconsin.

== Background ==
Carey attended Northwestern University in Evanston, Illinois, where he majored in Marketing and Business Administration. He received a Bachelor of Science degree in Business Administration and later went on to study for an M.B.A. at Northwestern University's Kellogg Graduate School of Management.

Carey served aboard USS Topeka in the South China Sea and Vietnam. He finished his active duty obligation in 1966. He began a career working with the Saudi Arabia Navy Expansion Program and the Saudi Petrochemical Industry.

President Ronald Reagan in 1981 nominated Carey as a Commissioner of the U. S. Federal Maritime Commission. He was elected Vice Chairman of the Commission in 1983, reappointed by President Reagan in 1985, and then appointed Chairman of the Commission in 1989 by President George H. W. Bush, where he served until 1991.

He is national public policy leader and International Grand Master of The Knights Templar International, recognized in "special consultative status" by the United Nations, former Chairman of the U.S. Federal Maritime Commission, and Eagle Scout.

In 2007, he endowed the Admiral James J. Carey Foundation for the support of "carefully chosen organizations, institutions, and associations that share the Admiral’s views on service to our nation and 'giving back' to society ..." He was the chairman of the Future Leaders for America Foundation, National Co-chairman of the 1700+ Member Organization for military admirals and generals, founder and chairman of the National Defense Committee, and Chairman of the Good Samaritans of the Knights Templar Foundation.

He has been recognized as an Outstanding Eagle Scout by the National Eagle Scout Association.
