= Max Vekich =

American politician and labor leader

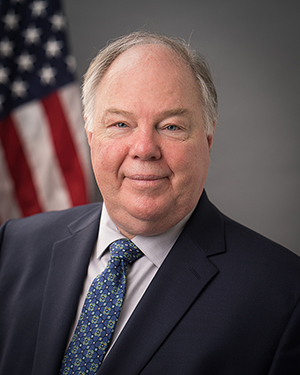

Commissioner of the Federal Maritime Commission
- Incumbent
- Assumed office February 15, 2022
- President: Joe Biden; Donald Trump
- Preceded by: Michael Khouri

Member of the Washington House of Representatives from the 35th district
- In office January 10, 1983 – January 14, 1991
- Preceded by: Eugene V. Lux
- Succeeded by: Tim Sheldon

Personal details
- Born: May 22, 1954 (age 72) Aberdeen, Washington, U.S.
- Party: Democratic
- Spouse(s): Ivy Frost-Vekich (died 1995) Marcee Stone-Vekich (m. 2012)
- Children: 2, and 1 stepchild as well as 4 grandchildren
- Education: Grays Harbor College (AA); University of Puget Sound (BA)

Max Milan Vekich (born 1954) is an American politician and labor leader who serves as a commissioner of the Federal Maritime Commission. A member of the Democratic Party, Vekich previously served as a member of the Washington House of Representatives from 1983 to 1991.

== Early life and education ==
Vekich was born and raised in Aberdeen, Washington. He earned an associate degree from Grays Harbor College on a football scholarship and served as student body president. Later, he graduated from University of Puget Sound with a Bachelor of Arts in political science and history. During his time at the University of Puget Sound Vekich was a member of Beta Theta Pi.

== Career ==
Vekich previously was a longshoreman and supercargo. He was also employed by the Pacific Maritime Association. He was elected at 28 years old and served as a member of the Washington House of Representatives from 1983 to 1991 as a Democrat. During his time in the Washington House of Representatives, Vekich served as the Chair of the House Commerce & Labor Committee from 1989-1990, Chair of the House Trade & Economic Development Committee from 1987 – 1988, and Chair of the House Agriculture Committee from 1985 - 1986.

In 2009, Vekich was an unsuccessful candidate for a seat on the Seattle Port Commission.

=== Federal Maritime Commission ===
On June 23, 2021, President Joe Biden nominated Vekich to serve as a commissioner of the Federal Maritime Commission. Hearings were held before the Senate Commerce Committee on October 20, 2021. The committee favorably reported the nomination to the Senate floor on November 17, 2021. Vekich's nomination expired at the end of the year and was returned to President Biden on January 3, 2022.

President Biden resent his nomination the following day. The committee favorably reported the nomination on February 2, 2022. Vekich was confirmed by the United States Senate on February 10, 2022.

Vekich was sworn into office on February 15, 2022.

== Personal life ==
Vekich lives in West Seattle with his wife, Marcee Stone-Vekich. He has two adult children with his late wife and one stepdaughter from his current wife.
