= United States Federal Maritime Board =

The United States Federal Maritime Board was an agency within the U.S. Department of Commerce, responsible for certain aspects of merchant shipping between 1950 and 1961.

== History ==
The agency was established in 1950 when the U.S. Maritime Commission was abolished and its responsibilities split between two new agencies: the Federal Maritime Board and the U.S. Maritime Administration (MARAD).

The Federal Maritime Board was responsible for regulating shipping and awarding subsidies for construction and operation of merchant vessels, while MARAD was responsible for administering subsidy programs, maintaining the national defense reserve merchant fleet, and operating the U.S. Merchant Marine Academy.

== Abolition ==
The Federal Maritime Board was abolished in 1961, when U.S. shipping laws were separated into two categories: regulatory and promotional. The regulatory role was assigned to the newly created Federal Maritime Commission, while the promotional role was assigned to MARAD.

Responsibility for U.S. merchant shipping has been held by different federal agencies since 1917. For a history, see United States Shipping Board.
