= John Harllee (admiral) =

American admiral

- Born: January 2, 1914; Washington, D.C., U.S.
- Died: February 5, 2005 (aged 91); Bethesda, Maryland, U.S.
- Education: United States Naval Academy; Naval War College
- Occupation: Admiral
- Spouses: Jo Beth Carden (m. 1937; died. 1985) Helen Tewksbury King (m. 1986; died. 2001)
- Children: 1

John Harllee (January 2, 1914 – February 5, 2005) was an American admiral who served in the United States Navy in World War II and the Korean War. He was a member of the Federal Maritime Commission from 1960 to 1969, and was a maritime consultant and wrote books and for professional journals after retiring.

== Life and career ==
Born in Washington, D.C., the son of Ella Fulmore and William C. Harllee, a United States Marine Corps general officer, Harllee attended Western High School. He then attended the United States Naval Academy and Naval War College, graduating from both.

Harllee was a lieutenant in Pearl Harbor at the time of the Japanese attack on the base. He was subsequently the chief staff officer of a torpedo boat group in the southwest Pacific consisting of 200 boats and 10,000 personnel, including Lt. John F. Kennedy. The group was honored with the Presidential Unit Citation for Outstanding Combat Performance in 1943 to 1944. He personally received the Silver Star and the Legion of Merit with the combat "V" device.

After World War II, Harllee was part of the Navy's Congressional liaison team, and was assigned to Representative John F. Kennedy from 1947 to 1948.

During the Korean War Harllee returned to active duty as the executive office of the cruiser Manchester, receiving the Commendation Medal. He retired from the Navy in 1959.

After retiring, Harllee served as the chairperson of Citizens for Kennedy and Johnson in northern California in 1960. After Kennedy was elected, he appointed Harllee to the Federal Maritime Commission, of which he became president in 1963. He was re-appointed to the commission by President Lyndon B. Johnson, and retired in 1969. After retiring, he traveled as a maritime consultant and wrote articles for professional journals. He was the author of three books: The Marine from Manatee: A Tradition of Rifle Marksmanship (1984), Terror and Triumph: The Saga of Frank Carden (1990) and From Ships Destroyed to Ships Enjoyed: One Man's Experiences at Sea From Pearl Harbor to the Captain's Table (1997).

Harllee died in February 2005 of pneumonia at the Maplewood Park Place retirement community in Bethesda, Maryland, at the age of 91.
