= SelectFlorida =

Floridian Economic Development Agency

SelectFlorida, Inc.
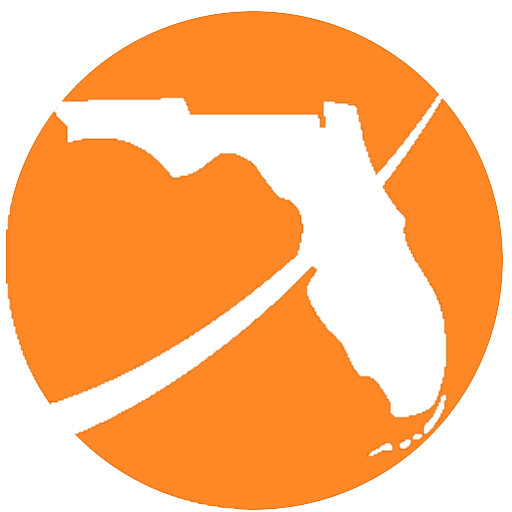

Agency overview
- Preceding agency: Enterprise Florida, Inc.
- Headquarters: Miami, Florida
- Website: https://selectflorida.org/

SelectFlorida, Inc., formerly Enterprise Florida, Inc. (EFI), is a public–private partnership between Florida’s business and government leaders and was the principal economic development organization for the state of Florida. EFI’s mission was to expand and diversify the state’s economy through job creation. In pursuit of its mission, EFI worked closely with a statewide network of economic development partners and was funded both by the State of Florida and by private-sector businesses. Enterprise Florida did not disclose who its donors were.

During the 2023 Florida legislative session, Speaker Paul Renner called for dissolution of the entity and instead diverted its funding to the Florida DEO. Some programs of Enterprise Florida were transferred to a new entity, SelectFlorida.

== History ==
In 1978, the responsibilities of the Florida Department of Commerce were split with the Department of Labor and Employment Security.

In 1996, under Governor Lawton Chiles, Florida became the first state in the nation to place principal responsibility for economic development, international trade, research and marketing in the hands of a business-government partnership. This move was motivated by the belief that with hands-on participation by Florida businesses, the state could develop a sophisticated economy driven by a diverse array industries and international business partners. Since its initial adoption by Florida in 1996, many U.S. states have gone on to implement this since reversed model.

On July 1, 2023 Florida House Bill 5 dissolved Enterprise Florida and transferred over 20 programs and their associated contracts to the Department of Economic Opportunity, which again was reorganized as the Florida Department of Commerce.

== Leadership ==
The Enterprise Florida, Inc. (EFI) Board of Directors comprised 59 members that represented businesses, government and other institutions in Florida. Current governor Ron DeSantis served the Board as an Appointed/Statute as the Governor, State of Florida and is the current Chairman.

With the creation of EFI, Florida became the first state to convert its Department of Commerce into a 501(c)(3) public-private partnership in which business has a leadership role. As such, EFI’s Board of Directors voting members represent Florida businesses, trade organizations, educational institutions, governments and economic development organizations. Just as businesses and citizens strengthen their communities through volunteerism, EFI’s board members do the same by participating in job creation efforts on behalf of the state.

On January 7, 2019, Jamal Sowell was named President & CEO of Enterprise Florida, Inc. (EFI).

== Key services ==
EFI's goal is to expand and diversify Florida's economy through job creation. In support of this mission, EFI:

- Recruits companies from all over the world to locate in Florida
- Assists with the expansion of established businesses in Florida
- Facilitates international trade and exporting
- Provides capital funding programs to assist small and minority businesses
- Advocates for the protection of Florida's military bases
- Promotes professional and amateur sporting events throughout the state

=== Competitive project business development ===
In collaboration with 67 statewide economic development offices, community leaders, utility partners and other local affiliates, EFI confidentially assists companies with their location, relocation and expansion plans by providing site selection services, demographic information, incentive information, etc. EFI’s job creation efforts focus on a wide range of industry sectors, including life sciences, information technology, aviation & aerospace, defense & homeland security, financial & professional services, manufacturing, clean energy and beyond.

=== International trade and development ===
Florida is home to more than 60,000 exporters, the second highest number in the United States. EFI's stated mission is to assist Florida businesses in expanding into the international marketplace by providing export counseling and advice, conducting overseas trade missions and trade shows, offering financial assistance for international event attendance, as well as research and reports to facilitate the export process.

Enterprise Florida maintains a network of 14 International Offices in 13 countries whose markets offer important trade and/or investment opportunities for Florida. Twelve full-service offices provide assistance to Florida companies that want to sell their products and services in these markets: Brazil, Canada (Toronto and Montreal), France, Germany, Hong Kong, Israel, Japan, Mexico, South Africa, Spain, and the U.K. They also play a critical role in representing Florida overseas and attracting foreign investment to the state. Pro bono offices in the Czech Republic and Taiwan provide limited services to Florida exporters interested in those markets.

=== Small business capital programs ===
Enterprise Florida, Inc.’s (EFI) Minority & Small Business, Entrepreneurship and Capital (MaSBEC) division partners with outside organizations to provide small, minority and entrepreneurial companies with training, development and financing options. EFI has a network of state, federal and non-profit resources with the stated purpose of helping small businesses to access capital, enter new markets, and create revenue growth and job creation.

=== Florida Defense Alliance ===
Florida Defense Alliance (FDA) was created in 1998 as a non-profit partnership between the Governor, Florida state officials, the Florida Congressional Delegation, state legislators, base commanders and staff, community leaders, and business executives. FDA's mission is to increase military value, enhance base capabilities, and promote multi-service synergies for Florida’s military bases, while supporting and enhancing the quality of life of Florida military families.

=== Florida Sports Foundation ===
In 2011, Florida Sports Foundation (FSF) joined the EFI team. FSF's mission is to assist Florida’s communities with securing, hosting and retaining Sporting events and sports related business to generate economic impact and tourism through the Foundation’s grant programs, legislative initiatives and Industry Partner service, recognition and development. FSF also provides the citizens of Florida with participation opportunities in Florida’s Sunshine State Games and Florida Senior Games events and assists in the promotion of targeted leisure sports industries in Florida.
