= Florida Department of Commerce =

Government agency in Florida

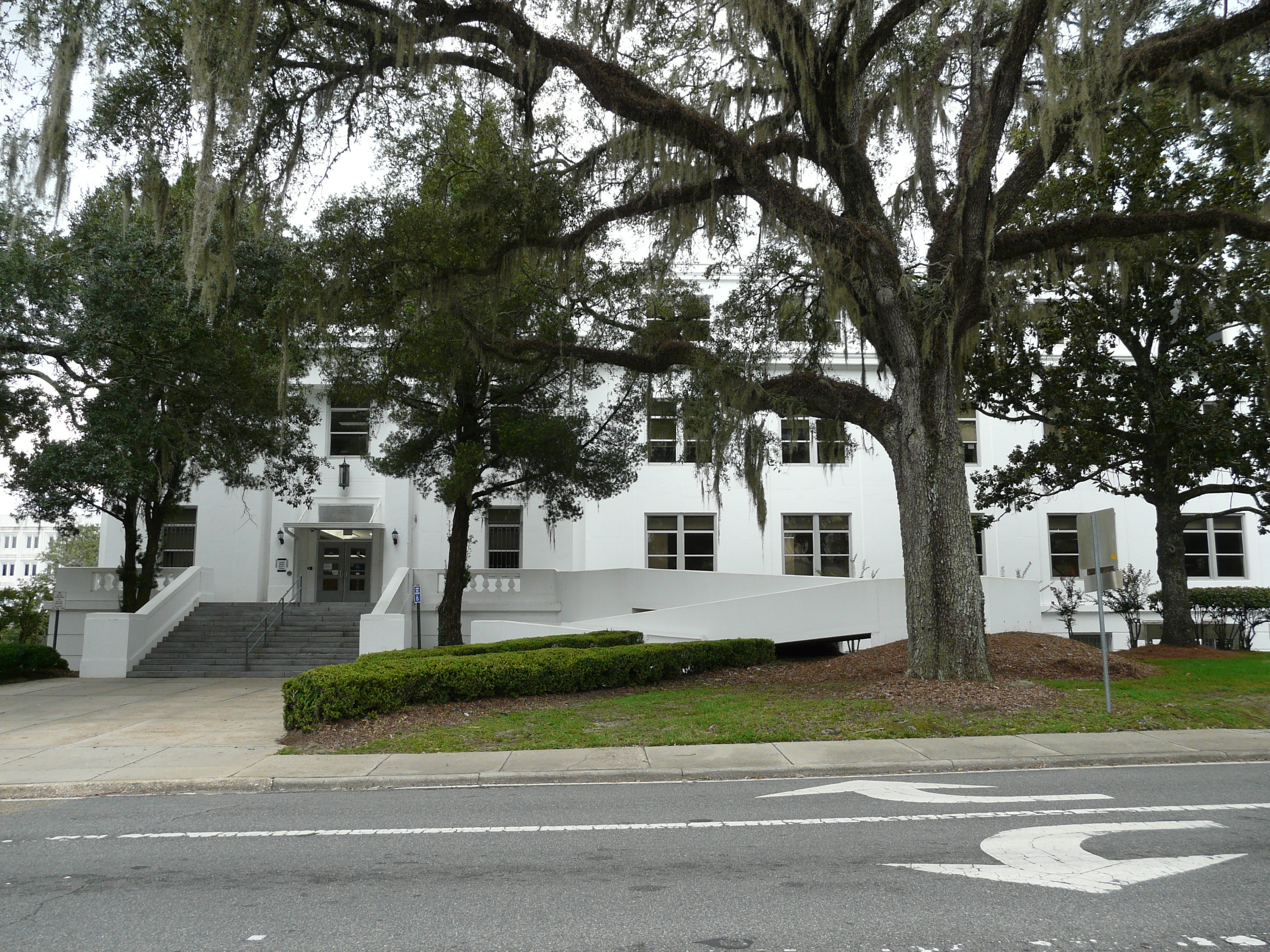
- The Caldwell Building in Tallahassee

Agency overview
- Formed: 2023
- Type: State agency
- Jurisdiction: Government of Florida
- Headquarters: 107 East Madison St., Tallahassee, Florida, U.S.
- Agency executive: J. Alex Kelly, Secretary
- Parent agency: Florida Cabinet
- Website: Official website

The Florida Department of Commerce, commonly known as FloridaCommerce, is a state agency of Florida. Based in the Caldwell Building in the state's capitol, Tallahassee, the agency is responsible for community, economic, and workforce development. The agency manages several boards and commissions, including SelectFlorida, with a focus on small businesses, employment, and re-employment. During hurricane season, FloridaCommerce assists in the economic recovery from natural disasters. The agency is also responsible for international economic development.

In 2023, the department was re-established by Governor Ron DeSantis in consolidation of Visit Florida, Enterprise Florida and the Florida Department of Economic Opportunity.

Since May 2023, the department has been headed by Secretary J. Alex Kelly, former deputy chief of staff to the Governor of Florida.
