= Rebecca F. Dye =

American government official (born 1952)

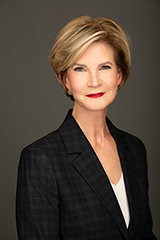

Commissioner of the Federal Maritime Commission
- Incumbent
- Assumed office November 14, 2002
- Nominated by: George W. Bush; Barack Obama; Joe Biden
- Preceded by: John A. Moran

Personal details
- Born: May 8, 1952 (age 73) Charlotte, North Carolina, U.S.
- Political party: Republican
- Education: University of North Carolina at Chapel Hill (BA, JD)

Military service
- Branch/service: United States Coast Guard

Rebecca Feemster Dye (born May 8, 1952) is an American attorney who has served as a commissioner of the Federal Maritime Commission since November 14, 2002.

== Early life and education ==
Dye grew up in Charlotte, North Carolina. She attended the University of North Carolina at Chapel Hill.

== Career ==
Dye began her career as a commissioned officer and attorney in the United States Coast Guard. She has served as law instructor at the United States Coast Guard Academy, an attorney at the United States Maritime Administration. and a Minority Counsel in Committee on Merchant Marine and Fisheries. Dye was the Counsel to the United States House Committee on Transportation and Infrastructure from 1995 until 2002.

Dye was nominated by President George W. Bush as Commissioner of the Federal Maritime Commission on June 13, 2002, and was confirmed by the United States Senate on November 14, 2002. She was nominated to her second term by President Bush on July 12, 2005, and confirmed by the Senate on July 22, 2005.

Dye was nominated to her third term by President Barack Obama and confirmed by the Senate on April 14, 2011. On May 26, 2016, She was nominated for her fourth term by President Obama and confirmed by the Senate on June 29, 2016, for a term expiring June 30, 2020.

On January 3, 2023, Commissioner Dye was nominated by President Joe Biden for a term expiring June 30, 2025.
