= John C. Truesdale =

American lawyer (1921–2011)

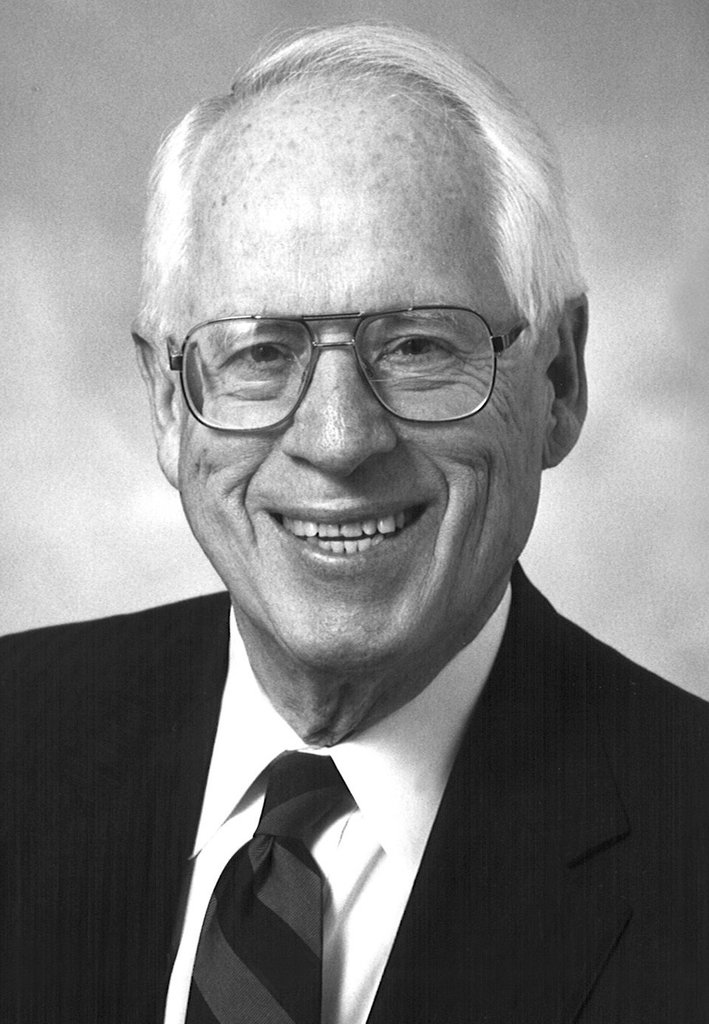
- Born: July 17, 1921; Grand Rapids, Michigan, US
- Died: July 3, 2011 (aged 89); Martinsburg, West Virginia, U.S.
- Occupations: Attorney; federal government employee
- Spouse: Karin Nelson Truesdale
- Children: Jack Truesdale, Charles Truesdale, Andrew Truesdale, Margaret Truesdale Quigley

John Cushman Truesdale Jr. (July 17, 1921 – July 3, 2011) was an American lawyer and civil servant who served two terms as executive secretary of the National Labor Relations Board, four terms as a board member, and one term as board chair.

== Early life and career ==
John Truesdale was born on July 17, 1921, in Grand Rapids, Michigan, to John C. and Hazel C. Truesdale. He was one of four children, and he had three sisters: Patty, Anne, and Mary. In 1927, his father was appointed professor of physical education at Grinnell College in Grinnell, Iowa. His father later was the college's men's basketball coach, and young John grew up in Grinnell and attended public schools there.

Like his siblings, he enrolled at Grinnell College and received his A.B. degree in social studies in 1942.

He joined the United States Coast Guard and entered the service in 1943. His first post was as an anti-submarine warfare instructor. From April 1944 to 1946, he was the anti-submarine warfare officer on the USS Peterson, an Edsall class destroyer escort serving convoy duty in the North Atlantic. On April 15, Truesdale's first day aboard ship, the Peterson and two other destroyer escorts engaged and sank a German submarine, the U-550. He became a lieutenant (junior grade).

Truesdale enrolled in September 1946 at the New York State School of Industrial and Labor Relations at Cornell University. He graduated with an M.S. in industrial and labor relations in May 1948. Cornell University had the only school of industrial relations at the time, and each year NLRB staff traveled to the school to hire qualified staff. One of Truesdale's professors had his entire class take the NLRB exam, and Truesdale scored well on it.

The Board offered Truesdale a job, and he was hired by the Buffalo field office as a field examiner in 1948. For several months after his appointment, he rented a room from fellow labor lawyer and friend Richard Lipsitz Sr.

== Early NLRB career ==
Truesdale proved to be a highly regarded field examiner. The NLRB offered to transfer him to more highly sought-after posts in other field offices over the next three years, but he declined each time. But believing that another refusal might hurt his career, he accepted a transfer to New Orleans in 1951. There he met Karin Nelson, a field examiner and labor economist from the San Francisco office who was on temporary assignment. Truesdale moved to Washington, D.C., in 1952, where he was appointed an administrative analyst for the board. He wed Karin Nelson in 1957.

Truesdale left the NLRB in 1957 after being appointed deputy director of the National Academy of Sciences. From July 1, 1957, to December 31, 1958, he served as director of information for the International Geophysical Year. He returned to his post as deputy director after the event ended, serving until 1963.

Truesdale returned to the NLRB in 1963. He was appointed associate executive secretary, and served in that role until 1968. He was promoted to deputy executive secretary and served in that capacity until 1972. Truesdale had a positive opinion of Edward B. Miller, the Nixon-appointed chair of the NLRB chair from 1970 to 1974. "He did not come to the board to execute a management agenda," Truesdale said in 2006. "He was a very fair-minded person; he worked well with his colleagues." He received his J.D. from Georgetown University Law Center in 1972. That same year he was appointed executive secretary of the board, the highest-ranking career office at the agency.

== First NLRB term, 1977–1981 ==
President Jimmy Carter nominated Truesdale to be a member of the NLRB on September 26, 1977, to fill the unexpired term of Peter D. Walther (who had resigned). The AFL-CIO was pushing Daniel Pollitt for the seat. Pollitt had been special counsel to Frank McCulloch, chair of the NLRB during the Kennedy and Johnson administrations, and employer groups (such as the Business Roundtable and United States Chamber of Commerce) were adamantly opposed to him. Walther and NLRB chair John H. Fanning were advocates of Truesdale, however. Employer groups felt Truesdale was somewhat liberal but would help push Fanning to adopt a more moderate course. Carter, not wishing to begin a political fight over what was perceived as a minor appointment, nominated Truesdale. The United States Senate confirmed him, and he served on the board from October 25, 1977, to August 27, 1980. Truesdale was succeeded as executive secretary by William Lubbers in 1979.

During his term on the board, Truesdale provided the critical vote in General Knit of California, Inc., 239 NLRB 619 (1978). The United Steelworkers of America had won an election, 134 to 104, at a specialized steel manufacturer, General Knit, Inc. The company asked the board to overturn the election because the union had distributed a leaflet on election day questioning whether the company had made a profit. In 1977, the board had held in Shopping Kart Food Market, 228 NLRB 1311 (1977) that elections should only be set aside only when egregious misstatements of fact occurred during election campaigning. Walther voted with other Republican-appointed Board members to uphold the election, arguing that the board's duty to quickly certify elections was more important than its duty to assure fair elections. The General Knit decision overturned Shopping Kart Food Market and restored the board's old rule as handed down in Hollywood Ceramics. Truesdale provided the critical third vote in the case.

Carter nominated Truesdale for a full five-year term on the Board on August 5, 1980. But Senate Republicans, convinced Truesdale was excessively pro-labor, sought to delay his confirmation until after the November elections (which Republican Ronald Reagan was expected to win). The Republicans announced in mid-August that they would filibuster Truesdale's appointment. By mid-September, Senate Republicans had adopted a much-enlarged strategy to bottle up large numbers of Carter appointees who would be able to serve past the end of the presidential term. On October 23, 1980, President Carter used his recess appointment powers to appoint Truesdale to the NLRB once again. Truesdale's recess appointment was effective only until Congress came back into session.

However, President Ronald Reagan withdrew Truesdale's nomination to the board the day after his own inauguration, and Truesdale resigned effective January 26, 1981.

== Return as executive secretary ==
But in a surprise move, the remaining NLRB members voted to appoint Truesdale as the board's executive secretary. President Carter had nominated Executive Secretary William Lubbers to be the board's general counsel on November 28, 1979, but when Republican Senators said they would filibuster the nomination Carter used his recess appointment powers to elevate Lubbers to the post. Robert Volger, Deputy Executive Secretary, was named Acting Executive Secretary. With the position still unfilled by the start of 1981, Truesdale applied for the job on January 18.

Truesdale's appointment, and his service until 1994, testified to his impartiality as board executive secretary. For example, in 1989, AFL-CIO President Lane Kirkland asserted that Reagan-era appointees to the board had tilted their decisions heavily toward management and had failed to impose harsh penalties on employers to violated the law. Truesdale defended the board, noting that only one member (Mary Miller Cracraft) had any employer connection before her service. Truesdale defended Cracraft as utterly impartial, and said that the National Labor Relations Act's penalties were intended to be remedial and not punitive.

In 1990, Truesdale oversaw a partial shutdown of NLRB operations. Truesdale identified a major budget shortfall in early August. By late August, Truesdale ordered a ban on all travel, and said all ULP hearings cancelled. Exceptions were made for cases involving picketing or were violence might break out. Truesdale even considered furloughing all NLRB workers for two to three days in September.

During this period, Truesdale also pushed for the board to engage in a rulemaking regarding the Supreme Court's decision in Communications Workers of America v. Beck, 487 U.S. 735 (1988). In that decision, the Court held that, in a union security agreement, unions are authorized by statute to collect from non-members only those fees and dues necessary to perform its duties as a collective bargaining representative. The rights identified by the Court in Communications Workers of America v. Beck have since come to be known as "Beck rights." In October 1991, White House Counsel C. Boyden Gray began criticizing the board and then-chair James M. Stephens for not adequately enforcing workers' Beck rights. Stephens had already proposed at this time a rulemaking on the issue, and in October 1991 and May 1992 Stephens acceded to requests by White House staff to show them the rule so they could provide comments on it. In May 1992, for only the second time in its history, the National Labor Relations Board undertook a regulatory rulemaking aimed at resolving the divergent, complex issues raised by the Beck decision. On September 3, 1992, even though the public comment period on the rule had closed, the White House sent a memo to Executive Secretary Truesdale indicating that comments on the rule were coming from the White House, that these comments should not be made public, that the White House expected these comments to be incorporated into the rule, and that the White House wanted to see the final rule before it was published. Truesdale and the Board's Solicitor General, John Higgins, sent a memo to the board the following day outlining the White House's requests and positions. The Board voted 4-to-1 (with Member Dennis Devaney dissenting) not to consider or review the White House memo.

The proposed rule issued on September 22, 1992. But after three and a half years of inaction on the proposed regulation, the board withdrew the rule on March 19, 1996—concluding that it could proceed faster through its more traditional case-by-case approach.

== Second NLRB term, 1994 ==
On January 24, 1994, President Bill Clinton used his recess appointment powers to elevate Truesdale to the board once again. Truesdale served just 38 days, until March 3, 1994.

The recess appointment came about due to a more urgent problem: the long-stalled nomination of William B. Gould IV, a Stanford University law professor. President Bill Clinton had nominated Gould to the NLRB in June 1993 with the intention of naming him chair. But Gould's appointment was held up by Senator Nancy Kassebaum, who (according to the New York Times) wanted to exercise power over Republican appointments to the board. According to Gould, Truesdale was interviewed by the Clinton administration in December 1993 and the offer of another recess appointment to the board extended to him. The Clinton administration had allegedly discussed the Truesdale recess appointment with Kassebaum, and offered to not appoint Truesdale as chair; in return, Kassebaum would allow the Gould nomination to go forward. According to Gould, the administration also agreed to nominate Charles I. Cohen, a former NLRB attorney practicing with the law firm of Ogletree, Deakins, Nash, Smoak & Stewart. The deal-making appeared to have worked, as Kassebaum relented on February 19, 1994. Gould was confirmed, 58 to 38, by the Senate on March 2, 1994.

In part, Truesdale's appointment was intended to give the National Labor Relations Board a quorum. Due to resignations, long periods between nominations, and long confirmation times in the Senate, only two of the five seats on the board were occupied. Truesdale's recess appointment gave the board a quorum and allowed it to conduct business. Truesdale's role was also to "keep the seat warm" for Gould, which is why his tenure lasted just 38 days.

Returning to his old role as Executive Secretary, Truesdale pushed the board to re-establish Rule 76–1, a procedural rule established by the Board in 1976. The rule required that, if three members of the board had agreed to a draft opinion and no dissent had yet circulated, the opinion would be issued within two weeks if no dissent was circulated within that time. On September 30, Truesdale formally asked the board to re-establish the rule, but the board declined in favor of other approaches to improve the speed with which decisions were issued.

== Third NLRB term, 1994–1996 ==
Truesdale returned to his position as the board's executive secretary, but on December 23, 1994, President Clinton again named him to a recess appointment on the board. Truesdale replaced Dennis Devaney, a conservative Democrat appointed to the Board by President George H. W. Bush. This recess appointment lasted until January 3, 1996.

According to Gould, Truesdale was a hard worker who produced decisions quickly, but who also adapted his views to changing political winds. He also overwhelmingly supported any request by the General Counsel for legal action to enforce the board's rulings. Gould and Truesdale clashed repeatedly on the role the board should play as well. Gould felt the chair should speak out publicly about pending labor law reform and should sponsor conferences on current issues in labor law to keep itself and the staff informed. But Truesdale advocated silence on pending legislation, and that the board should not create the appearance of partiality by sponsoring seminars.

Truesdale played a key role in several important decisions during his term on the board. Among these were Makro, Inc., 316 NLRB 109 (1995) (better known as Loehmann's Plaza II), in which the board reversed a precedent (Makro, Inc., 305 N.L.R.B. 663 [1991], also known as Loehmann's Plaza I) established just four years earlier and denied union picketers the right to access an employer's property; Oakland Mall, 316 NLRB 1160 (1995), also known as Oakland Mall II, in which the board held that nonemployee handbilling on behalf of a labor union may not occur on an employer's property; Leslie Homes, Inc., 316 NLRB 123 (1995), aff'd Metropolitan District Council of Philadelphia and Vicinity United Brotherhood of Carpenters and Joiners of America, AFL-CIO v. NLRB, 68 F.3d 71 (3d. Cir. 1995), in which the board held that a union may not picket on land occupied by homes being sold by a real estate developer. He also voted with the majority in important cases (California Saw & Knife Works, 320 NLRB 224 [1995], Paperworkers Local 1033 (Weyerhaeuser Paper Co.), 320 NLRB 349 [1995]) involving the rights of workers who are not union members as established in Communications Workers of America v. Beck, 487 U.S. 735 (1988). California Saw was the NLRB's first ruling in the wake of the U.S. Supreme Court's decision in Beck. Truesdale and the majority held that whenever a union seeks to make employees pay dues under a union security agreement, it must inform all workers that they have the legal right to remain a non-member of the union and to pay only such fees as may be used for collective bargaining purposes (and no more). Paperworkers Local 1033 (Weyerhaeuser Paper Co.) addressed issues which California Saw did not, and Truesdale and the board unanimously held that a union must inform all bargaining unit members (not just existing nonmembers) of their Beck rights and that they must inform all union members that they have the right to become a nonmember. In Canteen Co., 317 NLRB 1052 (1995), enf'd. 103 F.2d 1355 (7th Cir. 1997), Truesdale joined with the majority in a major new ruling on successorship. In Fall River Dyeing & Finishing Corp. v. NLRB, 482 U.S. 27 (1987), the Supreme Court had held that if a one company succeeds another, it has a duty to bargain with the previous company's union if there is a substantial continuity between the two companies and the new company retains at least 50 percent of the workforce. Joining an opinion written by Gould, Truesdale held that the duty to bargain was not sundered by the employer's decision to change wage rates or benefit levels. In Keeler Brass Automotive group, 317 NLRB 1110 (1995), Gould convinced Truesdale and Cohen to change their vote and form a five-member majority in holding that a grievance committee is not a labor organization under the NLRA and hence cannot be a "company union" (even if employer-dominated). In A.P.R.A. Fuel Oil Buyers Group, 320 NLRB 408 (1995), Truesdale joined with Gould against Democratic Member Peggy Browning to interpret the Supreme Court's ruling in Sure-Tan, Inc. v. NLRB, 467 U.S. 883 (1984). The Court had held in Sure-Tan that undocumented workers are entitled to back pay awards under the NLRA. In A.P.R.A. Fuel Oil, the collective bargaining agreement required the employer to reinstate laid-off workers first when it begins hiring again. If there were no dismissed workers available, then the employer was required to hire union-referred workers. The union asserted that this included undocumented workers. But Truesdale and the majority held that the board has no authority to force an employer to hire such undocumented workers.

=== The baseball strike ===
But his most important decision came in the 1994–95 Major League Baseball strike. Major League Baseball (MLB) and the Major League Baseball Players Association (MLBPA) had negotiated contracts eight times, and each time a strike action of varying length had occurred. By the spring of 1994, the possibility of a strike was rising, as owners and players argued over a salary cap, revenue-sharing (which would "tax" the sport's top money-making teams and redistribute the funds to the weakest teams), and the extent of salary arbitration. The NLRB was closely monitoring the situation, (in no small part because Chairman Gould was an avid baseball fan). On July 28, the MLBPA set a deadline of August 12, 1994, for a new collective bargaining agreement or it would strike. The strike began on August 12, but despite the appointment of former Secretary of Labor William Usery Jr. as a special mediator on October 13 the World Series was cancelled for the first time in history. On December 22, the owners unilaterally imposed a salary cap and eliminated salary arbitration. On Christmas Eve, MLB announced it would start spring training with strikebreaker players. Two days later, the owners and the players' association both filed unfair labor practice (ULP) complaints with the NLRB, with each side claiming the other had not negotiated in good faith. Meanwhile, the NLRB had initiated its own investigation into the strike (led by NLRB Regional Director Dan Silverman and NLRB General Counsel Fred Feinstein). The key issue for the board was whether the legal rules of negotiation had been followed. Under American labor law, the employer is permitted to implement its last offer if an impasse had been reached. But the two sides had been negotiating since November, and it was not entirely clear that an impasse had been reached. Congress was considering legislation to make baseball subject to United States antitrust law, and on January 26 President Bill Clinton announced that the two sides would have to make major progress to an agreement by February 6 or the federal government would intervene. On February 3, the owners unilaterally lifted their salary cap. But with no agreement even close, Usery hinted that he would recommend a legislative solution (perhaps removing the antitrust exemption, perhaps imposing binding arbitration) to the President. But Republicans in Congress (who had just won control of the House and Senate) signaled they would not enact any such legislation.

These developments made it more likely that the NLRB would be the one to decide the fate of the strike. Chairman Gould believed that General Counsel Feinstein was delaying the ULP investigation (perhaps to give negotiations a chance to work), but was troubled when Feinstein allegedly suggested that he become the board's chief spokesperson. Because the board and the General Counsel are legally independent entities by law, Gould refused to let Feinstein take the lead. Feinstein asked that he be allowed to speak to the entire board on the issue. Truesdale and NLRB member James Stephens voiced considerable concern over this proposed meeting, as issues in the strike were likely to come before the board and since the General Counsel and board were supposed to be at arm's length. When Feinstein became upset at their comments, Gould suggested that he approach the board's members himself. Feinstein did so, and won a meeting with the Board on March 8. But four of the five members of the board expressed their dissatisfaction with Feinstein's proposal, and it was dropped.

On March 17, Feinstein presented the results of his ULP investigation to the board and asked the board to approve a 10(j) injunction. Five days later, Truesdale and NLRB member Peggy Browning announced they were ready to approve the General Counsel's request. Gould then announced that the NLRB would meet in person on Thursday, Marcy 23, to discuss Feinstein's request (although it had never done so during his tenure before). Although Gould was ready to cast the third and determinative vote, on the night of March 22 Usery asked him to hold off on any decision as the two parties were making progress. Concerned that Usery was too closely aligned with the owners, Gould contacted White House Counsel Abner J. Mikva. Mikva advised Gould that "nobody thinks he [Usery] can reach the players. He has lost his influence." Gould informed Truesdale, Browning, and Feinstein of his conversation with Mikva after the call. The next morning (March 23), Gould repeated Usery's request to the entire Board (but not his conversation with Mikva), and recommended that the board delay action. The Board unanimously agreed to delay its decision until Tuesday, March 28. The MBLPA was incensed that Usery had sought a delay from Gould, and negotiations collapsed (for that and other reasons). On the afternoon of Friday, March 24, Gould spoke privately with Truesdale and recommended that since negotiations seemed to be going nowhere (despite Usery's claims) the board should meet on Sunday afternoon to vote on the 10(j) injunction request. Truesdale agreed, and Gould met privately with each of the other NLRB members to make the same request. Word of the meeting leaked to the New York Times, which published word of the meeting on Saturday, March 25.

In what the Associated Press termed an "extraordinary" session, the NLRB met on Sunday afternoon, March 26, to discuss Feinstein's request for a 10(j) injunction. Truesdale was highly critical of Gould's repeated contacts and interviews with the press, and the Board voted 4-to-1 to bar contacts with reporters. Gould alone dissented, and said he would not abide by the board's decision. Truesdale, seconded by Member Browning, also said that the board should not even reveal the outcome of the vote (whether it was 3-to-2 or 4-to-1 or 5-to-0). Gould "took strong exception to this view". When members Stephens and Cohen demanded that they be allowed to publicize their votes, Truesdale backed off his proposal. Truesdale, Gould, and Browning discussed the injunction request only briefly; Member Stephens, however, made a long speech about the case, labor policy in general, and sports labor law. In the end, after a two-hour meeting, Gould provided the critical third vote (joining Truesdale and Browning) to approve the request for injunctive relief.

The day after the decision, Gould says, Truesdale came into his office and subjected him to loud verbal abuse (which devolved into a shouting match) because Truesdale was upset that Gould had spoken to The New York Times about the board's decision. Gould lunched with Mikva after the incident, at which time Mikva allegedly counseled Gould to allow Truesdale and the other board members to write opinions supporting their votes in this high-profile case. Gould was unwilling to do this, and told Mikva that Truesdale was too deferential to the General Counsel's requests to make that a valuable exercise. On March 28, Gould learned that Truesdale was about to publish comments critical of Gould's contacts with the press during the baseball strike. Gould asked Mikva if the White House would be willing to privately discipline Truesdale, but Mikva indicated it would not.

On March 31, 1995, Judge Sonia Sotomayor of the District Court for the Southern District of New York granted the NLRB's request for a 10(j) injunction, and the players returned to work in time for the 1995 baseball season to begin. On September 29, 1995, the United States Court of Appeals for the Second Circuit upheld Judge Sotomayor's injunction.

Aspects of Truesdale and Gould's relationship seem highly contentious. But Michael J. Goldberg, Vice Dean at the Widener University School of Law, says that, while they differed on policy, their relationship was on the whole good and Truesdale's later account of his time on the NLRB with Gould is one of the more balanced ones.

== NLRB chairmanship, 1998–2001 ==
Truesdale retired after his third term on the NRLB ended in 1996, although he continued to act part-time as a labor arbitrator.

William Gould's term as NLRB chair ended on August 27, 1998. Two days later, the Clinton White House asked Truesdale to return to the NLRB as chair. "I was very conflicted about it," Truesdale later said. "But I worked for the NLRB for almost 50 years. How can you say no?" The administration's rationale for picking Truesdale was his acceptability to employers, conservative groups, and Republicans in Congress as well as a desire to avoid the contentious relationship Gould had with these groups during his tenure as chair. Administration officials also hoped Truesdale would smooth relationships among NLRB members themselves, who often had an unhappy relationship with Gould.

Truesdale was given a recess appointment to the NLRB on December 4, 1998, and named chair by President Clinton. His recess appointment was due to expire in August 1999 when the Senate recessed, but he was unanimously confirmed by the Senate on November 19, 1999. Truesdale said his only goal as chair would be to reduce the amount of time the board took to issue a decision. Truesdale's term of office was due to expire on August 27, 2003, but he said that he would step down as chair once a new president was inaugurated in 2001.

During his tenure as chair, The Washington Post reported, Truesdale helped eliminate a severe backlog of cases. When Truesdale's term began, the board had about 700 cases pending. James A. Gross, a professor of labor studies at Cornell University, said in 2011 that eliminating the case backlog and shortening the time between a case's initial filing and its resolution was Truesdale's major accomplishment as chair. True to his position taken during the baseball strike controversy, Truesdale also largely kept the NLRB out of the news media. Ex-chairman Gould alleged that the Truesdale Board failed to issue decisions on many of the policy issues which the Gould Board had been considering, and that the Truesdale Board declined to issue 10(j) injunctions. However, Daily Labor Report (an independent publication which monitors federal labor policy and the NLRB) said that board members felt the NLRB was much more collegial under Truesdale.

Truesdale's term as chair of the NLRB lasted just over two years, and during that time the board neither overturned much precedent nor generated new doctrine. However, in late February 200, the Board did decertify the Major League Umpires Association and certified the World Umpires Association as the new union for umpires in Major League Baseball. Truesdale wrote the three-paragraph opinion certifying the new union. The Board also issued two important rulings in October and November 2000. The first, New York University, 332 NLRB 1205 (2000), found that graduate student teaching and research assistants at private colleges and universities were employees as defined by the NLRA. Truesdale convinced Republican Member Peter J. Hurtgen to join himself and Member Wilma B. Liebman in relying on Boston Medical Center, 330 NLRB 152 (1999) (which reversed precedent and found medical interns and residents to be employees) to find the graduate students to be employees. The same day, in NYP Acquisition Corp., 332 NLRB 1041 (2000), Truesdale convinced Member Sarah Fox to join himself and Hurtgen in significantly modifying the board's successorship rulings. Rupert Murdoch's News Corporation bought the New York Post in 1976. When News Corp. purchased a New York City television station in 1988, federal regulators required Murdoch to sell the Post. The new publisher went bankrupt in 1991, and News Corp. purchased the paper again in 1993. The New York Post subsequently laid off large numbers of union workers. With the NLRB only at three members due to resignations and delayed confirmations, Truesdale and Hurtgen joined to alter the board's successorship test by concluding that the subsidiary News Corp. used to buy the paper in 1993 was sufficiently different from the 1976 News Corp. subsidiary and with sufficiently different goals that it did not trigger the board's successorship duty-to-bargain requirements.

But in the waning months of the Clinton administration, Truesdale led the board in making two major new rulings. The first came in M.B. Sturgis, Inc., 331 NLRB 1298 (2000), in which the board overturned long-standing precedent and permitted temporary workers to unionize. And in Epilepsy Foundation of Northeast Ohio, 331 NLRB 676 (2000), the board extended the right to have a worker representative present during disciplinary hearings to nonunion employees.

George W. Bush won the 2000 U.S. presidential election, and Truesdale signaled that he would resign his seat on the board in order to permit Bush to appoint his own chairperson. But there was concern that if Truesdale stepped down right away, the board would lack a quorum until such time as the Senate confirmed Bush's new appointees. Subsequently, Truesdale delayed his resignation from the NLRB. As Bush's nominee for chair, Peter Hurtgen, was confirmed on May 15, 2001, but Truesdale remained on the board to help the agency maintain its quorum. As his tenure as chair came to a close, Truesdale publicly urged Hurtgen and future NLRB chairs to look hard at existing precedent to ensure board decisions met the needs of the modern workplace and to continue to keep the backlog of cases low.

Truesdale resigned as chair of the NLRB on May 14, 2001, but remained on the board until resigning on October 1, 2001.

Rene Alexander Acosta was nominated on October 9, 2001, as Truesdale's replacement on the board. Acosta was confirmed on November 22, 2002, for Truesdale's unexpired term that ended on August 27, 2003.

== Retirement and death ==
Truesdale had kind words for his successor, Peter J. Hurtgen. "He's not an ideologue," Truesdale said in October 2002. "He came from a management background, and I guess he himself would tell you he was a conservative Republican and a management-oriented person. But he was always very fair."

Although he was 78 years old when he left the NLRB in 1998, Truesdale continued to work as an arbitrator—and continued to make headlines. One such ruled came in the Banita Jacks case. In 2008, Jacks was found guilty of starving and then murdering her four children (aged 5 to 16). Four days after the bodies were found, District of Columbia Mayor Adrian Fenty fired six employees of Washington's Child and Family Services Agency, saying they "just didn't do their job." Three of the social workers filed grievances with the city. Truesdale was assigned to the case as an arbitrator. In September 2008, Truesdale issued an opinion in which he ruled that all three had been illegally terminated. Truesdale ordered the city to rehire the social workers at the same pay and benefit grades, expunge the incident from their personnel records, and give them back pay (with interest) and benefits for the period while they were terminated.

Another case involved the Metropolitan Police Department of the District of Columbia (MPD). In 2007, newly appointed MPD Chief of Police Cathy L. Lanier announced the "All Hands on Deck" policy, in which all 4,000 MPD officers worked for three straight days to patrol high-crime neighborhoods and execute arrest warrants. Several "All Hands on Deck" periods occurred in 2007, 2008, and 2009. The Fraternal Order of Police (FOP), a labor union representing police officers in the District of Columbia, filed six to 10 grievances over the practice, claiming it violated the collective bargaining agreement and broke D.C. law. In September 2009, Truesdale filed an arbitrator's report in which he held that the MPD forced officers to change vacation days and tours of duty in violation of the union contract, failed to bargain with the FOP over these unilateral contract changes, and ordered the city to halt the "All Hands on Deck" initiative. He also ordered the MPD to pay overtime (with interest) to those officers who worked extra shifts. Lanier said would appeal the ruling to the Public Employee Relations Board and the courts.

Truesdale moved from his home in Bethesda, Maryland, to an assisted living facility in Annapolis, Maryland, in 2005. In early 2011, he moved to Martinsburg, West Virginia, to be closer to family members. He died at West Virginia University Hospitals East-City Hospital from cancer on July 3, 2011. He was survived by his wife and four children. He was interred at Arlington National Cemetery.

== Awards, memberships, and honors ==
John C. Truesdale was a member of the American Bar Association, Maryland Bar Association, and District of Columbia Bar Association. He was also a Fellow of the College of Labor and Employment Lawyers, a professional association of labor and employment law lawyers which promotes the practice of labor and employment law and honors outstanding achievement in these fields.

Truesdale was a member of the executive board of the Association of Labor Relations Agencies from 1983 to 1995, and served as the organization's president from 1992 to 1993. He was a long-time member of the D.C. chapter of the Industrial Relations Research Association, and was the association's president in 1989.

Truesdale was a well-known arbitrator, and he worked for the American Arbitration Association, Federal Mediation and Conciliation Service, National Mediation Board, and Oregon Employment Relations Board. He also served for a time as a member of the Foreign Service Grievance Board.

In 1988, Truesdale was awarded the President's Rank Award for Meritorious Executives, the second-highest annual award given to members of the Senior Executive Service in the U.S. federal government.

== Bibliography ==
- Flynn, Joan. "'Expertness for What?': The Gould Years at the NLRB and the Irrepressible Myth of the 'Independent' Agency." Administrative Law Review. 52:465 (2000).
- Goldberg, Michael J. "Inside Baseball at the NLRB: Chairman Gould and His Critics." Stanford Law Review. 55:1045 (January 2002).
- Gould, William B. Labored Relations: Law, Politics, and the NLRB. Cambridge, Mass.: MIT Press, 2001.
- Gross, James A. Broken Promise: The Subversion of U.S. Labor Relations Policy, 1947–1994. Philadelphia, Pennsylvania: Temple University Press, 1995.
- McGuiness, Kenneth C. and Silverberg, Louis G. How to Take a Case Before the National Labor Relations Board. Washington, D.C.: Bureau of National Affairs, 1976.
- National Labor Relations Board. Sixty-First Annual Report of the National Labor Relations Board for the Fiscal Year Ended September 39, 1996. Washington, D.C.: U.S. Government Printing Office, 1997. ISBN 0-16-049173-8
- Njoya, Wanjiru. Property in Work: The Employment Relationship in the Anglo-American Firm. Aldershot, England: Ashgate, 2007.
- Nollen, John Scholia. Grinnell College. Iowa City, Ia.: The State Historical Society of Iowa, 1953.
- Public Papers of the Presidents of the United States. Jimmy Carter, 1979, Book 2: June 23 to December 31, 1979. Washington, D.C.: General Services Administration, 1981.
- Skrzycki, Cindy. The Regulators: Anonymous Power Brokers in American Politics. Lanham, Md.: Rowman and Littlefield, 2003.
- Stein, Michael Ashley. "Book Review: Hardball, Politics, and the NLRB." Berkeley Journal of Employment and Labor Law. 22:507 (2001).
- Toner, John J. "The NLRA at 70: John Truesdale Recognized for Lifetime Achievement." Labor Law Journal. October 2005.
- Truesdale, John C. "Battling Case Backlogs at the NLRB: The Continuing Problem of Delays in Decision Making and the Clinton Board's Response". Labor Lawyer. 16:1 (2000).
- Twomey, David P. Labor & Employment Law: Text & Cases. Mason, Ohio: South-Western Cengage Learning, 2010.
- Who's Who in Labor. New York: Arno Press, 1976.
- Woldow, Brian J. "The NLRB's (Slowly) Developing Beck Jurisprudence: Defending a Right in a Politicized Agency." Administrative Law Review. 52:1075 (2000).
- Zebrak, Scott A. "Comment: The Future of NLRB Rulemaking: Analyzing the Mixed Signals Sent by the Implementation of the Health Care Bargaining Unit Rule and by the Proposed Beck Union Dues Regulation." Administrative Law Journal. 8:125 (Spring 1994).
