= Betty S. Murphy =

American lawyer

Betty Southard Murphy
- Born: March 1, 1933; East Orange, New Jersey, U.S.
- Died: October 16, 2010 (aged 77); Washington, D.C., U.S.
- Occupations: Attorney; federal government employee
- Political party: Republican
- Spouse(s): Cornelius F. Murphy, M.D.
- Children: Neil, Ann

Betty Jane Southard Murphy (March 1, 1933 – October 16, 2010) was an American attorney who was the first woman to serve on the National Labor Relations Board, serving as the agency's eighth chair from 1975 to 1977. She was also the first woman to lead the United States Department of Labor Wage and Hour Division, and co-founded the National Women's Political Caucus and the Republican National Lawyers Association.

== Early life ==
She was born on March 1, 1933, in East Orange, New Jersey, to Mr. and Mrs. Floyd Theodore Southard. Her father was a businessman, and she had two brothers (Samuel and Harry). Shortly after she was born, her family moved to Atlantic City, New Jersey, where she was raised. Samuel became a pediatrician, and Harry a high school teacher. She earned her undergraduate degree at Ohio State University, and later studied at the Sorbonne and the Alliance Francaise in Paris, France. After graduating from college she worked as a freelance foreign correspondent and later worked for United Press International as its reporter in Washington, D.C., where her coverage of the U.S. Supreme Court fostered an interest in law. She ultimately enrolled at Washington College of Law and was awarded a law degree in 1958.

== Early legal and NLRB career ==
Pursuing a new career as an attorney, she worked for a year at the NLRB as an enforcement attorney. She left government service and joined the law firm of Wilson, Woods & Villalon, representing clients in 19 states and arguing cases before nine of the 11 United States courts of appeals. In 1967, Murphy represented syndicated columnists Drew Pearson and Jack Anderson in a libel suit brought by Senator Thomas J. Dodd after they published Dodd's personal Internal Revenue Service tax filings which indicated he had used campaign funds for his personal use. Dodd was later censured by the Senate and lost re-election, and the Supreme Court of the United States refused to review a lower court's ruling that the suit was improper. Murphy was confirmed by the U.S. Senate as the first female Administrator for the U.S. Department of Labor in its Wage and Hour Division in June 1974.

In February 1975, when Murphy was sworn in to serve as the first woman to chair the National Labor Relations Board, President Gerald Ford said he chose her as "the most qualified and best respected person" for the job and not because of her sex. The AFL-CIO declined to oppose her nomination, noting that she had represented both management and labor fairly during her legal career. While on the NLRB, the five-member board handed down rulings regarding rules for collective bargaining and union organization in the healthcare field, allowing separate bargaining units for clerks, maintenance workers, medical technicians and nurses, in which Murphy cast the deciding vote. Harking back to her journalism career, she cast the only vote against a 1976 decision regarding the rights of newspaper employees to form unions, noting her dissent that the skills required to be a reporter were "the essence of professionalism". She was succeeded as NLRB chairman by John H. Fanning in 1977 and served on the board until 1979 when she turned down an interim appointment by President Jimmy Carter.

== Later legal career ==
As a partner at the Washington law firm of Baker Hostetler starting in 1980, Murphy was a trial lawyer who appeared before the United States courts of appeals and the Supreme Court. She received Presidential appointments to serve on the Commission on the Bicentennial of the United States Constitution and the International Centre for Settlement of Investment Disputes. She co-founded the National Women's Political Caucus and co-founded and later co-chaired the Republican National Lawyers Association. As of 2006, she was the first and only lawyer elected to the prestigious National Academy of Human Resources. She was chair of several American Bar Association committees, and named a "Legend of the Law" by the D.C. Bar Association.

A resident of Alexandria, Virginia, Murphy died at the age of 77 of pneumonia on October 16, 2010, in Washington, D.C. She was survived by her husband, Cornelius F. Murphy, M.D., as well as by a daughter, a son, and a grandson.

== Bibliography ==
- Kohn, George Childs. The New Encyclopedia of American Scandal. New York, NY: Checkmark Books, 2001.
- Love, Barbara J. Feminists Who Changed America, 1963-1975. Urbana, Ill.: University of Illinois Press, 2006.
