= National Labor Relations Board =

U.S. federal government agency

Agency overview
- Formed: July 5, 1935; 91 years ago
- Preceding agencies: National Labor Board; "First" National Labor Relations Board; National War Labor Board (World War II); Council on Wage and Price Stability (Carter-era)
- Headquarters: Washington, D.C.
- Employees: 1,232 (November 2023)
- Agency executives: James Murphy, Chairman; Crystal Carey, General Counsel
- Website: nlrb.gov

The National Labor Relations Board (NLRB) is an independent agency of the federal government of the United States that enforces U.S. labor law in relation to collective bargaining and unfair labor practices. Under the National Labor Relations Act of 1935, the NLRB has the authority to supervise elections for labor union representation and to investigate and remedy unfair labor practices. Unfair labor practices may involve union-related situations or instances of protected concerted activity.

The NLRB is governed by a five-person board and a general counsel, all of whom are appointed by the president with the consent of the Senate. Board members are appointed for five-year terms and the general counsel is appointed for a four-year term. The general counsel acts as a prosecutor and the board acts as an appellate quasi-judicial body from decisions of 36 administrative law judges, as of November 2023. The NLRB is headquartered at 1015 Half St. SE, Washington, D.C.and has over 30 regional, sub-regional, and residential offices throughout the United States.

== History ==
=== 1933–1935: National Labor Board becomes first collective bargaining organization ===
The history of the National Labor Relations Board (NLRB) can be traced to enactment of the National Industrial Recovery Act in 1933. Section 7(a) of the act protected collective bargaining rights for unions, but was difficult to enforce. The NLRB was not given monitoring powers. A massive wave of union organizing was punctuated by employer and union violence, general strikes, and recognition strikes. The National Industrial Recovery Act was administered by the National Recovery Administration (NRA). At the outset, NRA Administrator Hugh S. Johnson believed that Section 7(a) would be self-enforcing, but the tremendous labor unrest proved him wrong. On August 5, 1933, President Franklin D. Roosevelt announced the establishment of the National Labor Board, under the auspices of the NRA, to implement the collective bargaining provisions of Section 7(a).

The National Labor Board (NLB) established a system of 20 regional boards to handle the immense caseload. Each regional board had a representative designated by local labor unions, local employers, and a "public" representative. All were unpaid. The public representative acted as the chair. The regional boards could hold hearings and propose settlements to disputes. Initially, they lacked authority to order representation elections, but this changed after Roosevelt issued additional executive orders on February 1 and February 23, 1934.

The NLB, too, proved ineffective. Congress passed Public Resolution No. 44 on June 19, 1934, which empowered the president to appoint a new labor board with authority to issue subpoenas, hold elections, and mediate labor disputes. On June 29, President Roosevelt abolished the NLB and in Executive Order 6763 established a new, three-member National Labor Relations Board.

Lloyd K. Garrison was the first chairman of the National Labor Relations Board (often referred to by scholars the "First NLRB" or "Old NLRB"). The "First NLRB" established organizational structures which continue at the NLRB in the 21st century. This includes the regional structure of the board; the use of administrative law judges and regional hearing officers to initially rule on cases; an appeal process to the national board; and the use of expert staff, organized into various divisions, at the national level. Formally, Garrison established the:

- Executive Office, which handled administrative activities of the national and regional boards, field staff, and Legal Division. It was overseen by an executive secretary.
- Examining Division, national staff which conducted field investigations and assisted the regional boards with adjudications, hearings, and representative elections.
- Information Division, which provided the press and public with news.
- Legal Division, which assisted the Department of Justice in seeking compliance with board decisions in the courts, or in responding to suits brought about by board decisions. (Note: The "first NLRB" was barred from initiating or responding to lawsuits itself. It could only ask the Department of Justice to act on its behalf.)
- Research Division, which studied decisions of the regional boards so that a comprehensive labor law might be developed, and studied the economics of each case.

Within a year, however, most of the jurisdiction of the "First NLRB" was stripped away. Its decisions in the automobile, newspaper, textile, and steel industries proved so volatile that Roosevelt himself often removed these cases from the board's jurisdiction. Several federal court decisions further limited the board's power. Senator Robert F. Wagner (D – NY) subsequently pushed legislation through Congress to give a statutory basis to federal labor policy that survived court scrutiny. On July 5, 1935, a new law—the National Labor Relations Act (NLRA, also known as the Wagner Act)—superseded the NIRA and established a new, long-lasting federal labor policy. The NLRA designated the National Labor Relations Board as the implementing agency.

=== 1935–1939: Constitutionality, communism, and organizational changes ===
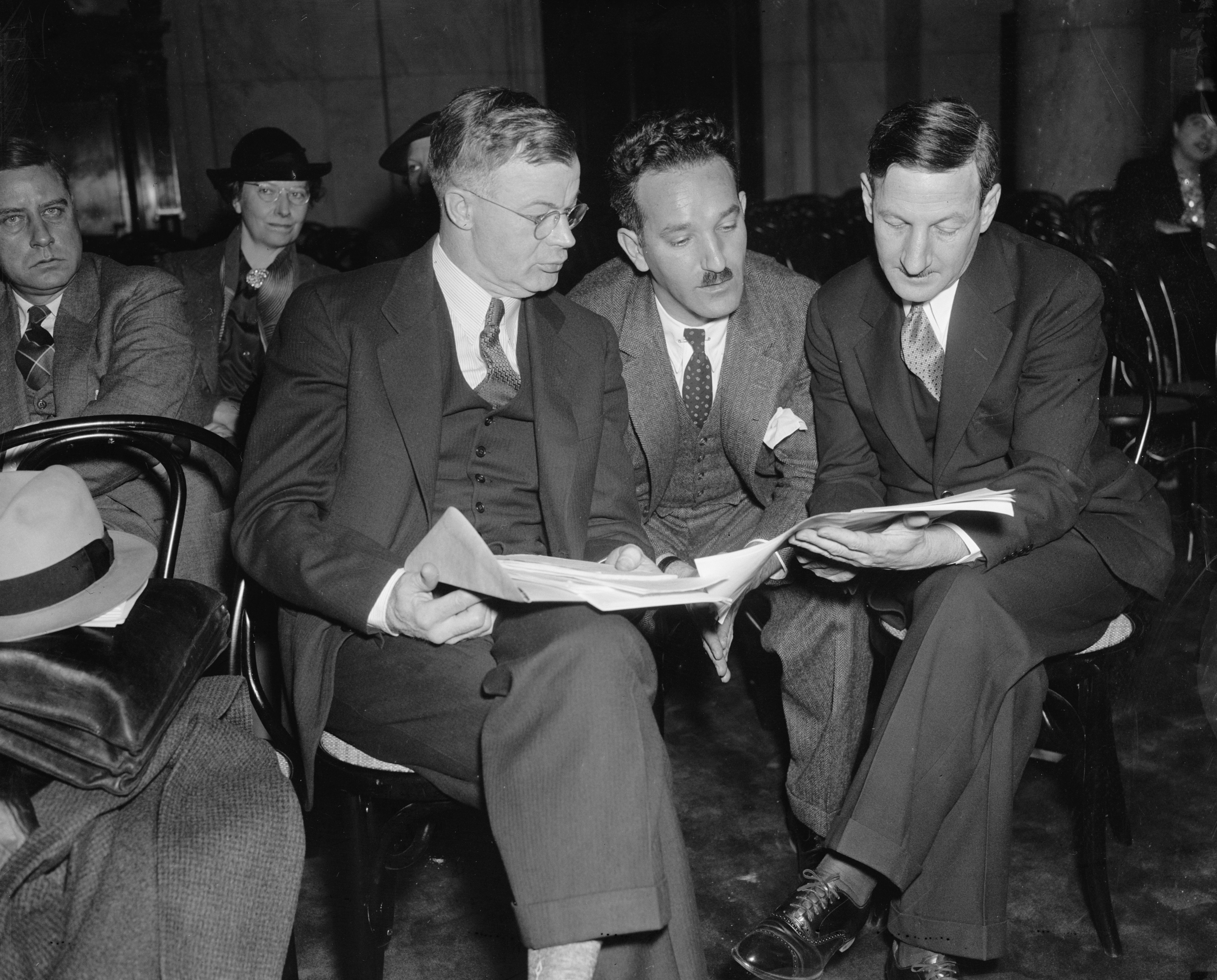
J. Warren Madden (left), Nathan Witt, and Charles Fahy (right) reviewing documents before a congressional hearing on December 13, 1937

The first chairman of the "new" NLRB was J. Warren Madden, professor of the University of Pittsburgh School of Law. Madden largely confirmed the previous structure of the "first NLRB" by formally establishing five divisions within the agency:

- Administrative Division: Oversaw all administrative activities of national and regional boards and their finances; led by the secretary
- Economic Division: Analyzed economic evidence in cases; made studies of economics of labor relations for use by board and courts; supervised by the chief industrial economist; also known as the Technical Service Division
- Legal Division: Handled NLRB either decisions appealed to courts or cases in which NLRB sought enforcement of its decisions; overseen by general counsel (hired by NLRB board); has two subdivisions:
  - Litigation Section: Advised national and regional boards, prepared briefs, worked with Justice Department
  - Review Section: Analyzed regional hearings and decisions; issued interpretations of law; prepared forms; drafted regulations
- Publications Division: Handled all press and public inquiries; published decisions of national and regional boards and their rules and regulations; overseen by the director of publications
- Trial Examining Division: Held hearings before the national board; overseen by the chief trial examiner

Benedict Wolf served as first secretary of the NLRB, Charles H. Fahy the first general counsel, and David J. Saposs the first chief industrial economist. Wolf resigned in mid-1937, and Nathan Witt (an attorney in the Legal Division) was named Secretary in October.

The Economic Division was a critical one for the NLRB. Cause-and-effect was one of the fundamental assumptions of the National Labor Relations Act, and for the causes of labor unrest to be understood economic analysis was needed. From the start, the Economic Division undertook three important tasks: 1) Gather economic data in support of cases before the courts; 2) Conduct general studies of labor relations to guide the board in formulating decisions and policies; and 3) Research the history of labor relations (the history of written agreements, whether certain issues were historically part of collective bargaining, how unions functioned internally, trends in employer activities, trends in collective bargaining, whether certain employer actions led to labor disputes, etc.) so that the board could educate itself, the courts, Congress, and the public about labor relations. The first function proved critical to the survival of the NLRB. It was the Economic Division's data and analysis, more than then NLRB's legal reasoning, which proved critical in persuading the Supreme Court to sustain the Wagner Act in NLRB v. Jones & Laughlin Steel. The Court even cited several Economic Division studies in its decision. In the wake of Jones & Laughlin Steel, many labor relations experts outside the agency concluded that economic analysis was "an accepted fact" essential to the proper functioning of the agency. The Economic Division did, too. It asked Madden to pair an economist with an attorney in every important case, and prepared outline of the economic data needed to support each case in case it went before the courts.

During his time on the NLRB, Madden was often opposed by the American Federation of Labor (AFL), which believed that Madden was using the NLRA and the procedures and staff of the NLRB to favor the AFL's primary competitor, the Congress of Industrial Organizations (CIO). The NLRB and NLRA were also under intense pressure from employers, the press, congressional Republicans, and conservative Democrats.

The NLRB's Economic Division proved critical in pushing for a congressional investigation into employer anti-union activities, and ensuring that investigation was a success. The Economic Division was deeply aware of employer use of labor spies, violence, and company unions to thwart union organizing, and quietly pressed for a congressional investigation into these and other tactics. Senator Robert M. La Follette Jr. took up the suggestion, on June 6, 1936, the Senate Committee on Education and Labor established a Subcommittee Investigating Violations of Free Speech and the Rights of Labor chaired by La Follette. Better known as the "La Follette Committee", the subcommittee held extensive hearings for five years and published numerous reports. The committee uncovered extensive evidence of millions of company dollars used to pay for spies and fifth columnists within unions, exposed the culpability of local law enforcement in acts of violence and murder against union supporters (particularly in the Harlan County War), revealed the wide extent of illegal blacklisting of union members, and exposed the use of armed strikebreakers and widespread stockpiling of tear gas, vomit gas, machine guns, mortars, and armor by corporations to use against strikers. Some of the evidence the committee used was provided by the Economic Division, and the investigation proved critical for a time in defending the agency from business and congressional attack.

The biggest issue the NLRB faced was constitutional. The Justice Department and NLRB legal staff wanted the Supreme Court to rule as quickly as possible on the constitutionality of the NLRA. But the board and Justice Department also realized that the Court's Lochner era legal philosophy made it unlikely for the Court to uphold the Act. Subsequently, Madden strove to resolve minor cases before they could become court challenges, and worked to delay appeals as long as possible until the best possible case could be brought to the Court. This legal strategy paid off. The Supreme Court upheld the NLRA in National Labor Relations Board v. Jones & Laughlin Steel Corporation, 301 U.S. 1 (1937). Afterward, Madden continued to strategically guide the NLRB's legal efforts to strengthen the federal courts' view of the NLRA and the board's actions. Because of the efforts of Madden and NLRB general counsel Charles H. Fahy, the Supreme Court reviewed only 27 cases between August 1935 and March 1941, even though the board had processed nearly 5,000 cases since its inception. The Supreme Court enforced the NLRB's rulings in 19 cases without modifying them, enforced them with modification in six more, and denied enforcement in two cases. Additionally, the board won all 30 injunction and all 16 representation cases before the lower courts, a rate of success unequalled by any other federal agency.

AFL opposition to the "Madden Board" grew after decisions in Shipowners' Ass'n of the Pacific Coast, 7 NLRB 1002 (1938), enf'd American Federation of Labor v. National Labor Relations Board, 308 U.S. 401 (1940) (awarding a longshoremen's unit to the CIO rather than the AFL), and American Can Co., 13 NLRB 1252 (1939) (unit's history of collective bargaining outweighs desire of workers to form craft-only unit). (Note: The AFL held to a philosophy of craft unionism, while the CIO believed in industrial unionism. According to the AFL, American Can decisively tipped NLRB policy in favor of the CIO.)

The AFL began pushing for an investigation into the NLRB, and this investigation led to allegations of communist influence within the agency. In June 1938, the House Un-American Activities Committee (led by Chairman Martin Dies Jr. [D-TX]) heard testimony from AFL leader John P. Frey, who accused Madden of staffing the NLRB with communists. The allegations were true, in at least one case: Nathan Witt, the NLRB's executive secretary and the man to whom Madden had delegated most administrative functions, was a member of the Communist Party of the United States. These allegations and discoveries significantly damaged the agency's support in Congress and with the public.

A second investigation into the NLRB led to organizational changes at the board. On July 20, 1939, Republicans and conservative Democrats formed a coalition to push through the House of Representatives a resolution establishing a Special Committee to Investigate the National Labor Relations Board (the "Smith Committee"), chaired by conservative, anti-labor representative Howard W. Smith (D-VA). On March 7, 1940, the Smith Committee proposed legislation to abolish the NLRB, reconstitute it, and radically amend the NLRA. (Note: Among the changes proposed: Removing of many of the guarantees of collective bargaining from the Wagner Act's preamble, denying legal protection to sitdown strikers and agricultural workers, removing the requirement that employers must bargain with unions, making the General Counsel independent from the Board, abolishing the board's economic research unit, enhancing employer free speech rights, introducing the right of employers to seek an election among their workers, and removing the board's authority to engage in bargaining unit determination. See: Bernstein & Piven 1969, p. 670) President Roosevelt opposed the bill, although he conceded that perhaps the board's membership should be expanded to five from three. The Smith bill won several early tests in the House, which also voted to substantially cut the NLRB's budget. Smith won a vote in the House Rules Committee permitting him to bring his bill to the floor for a vote. In an attempt to defuse the legislative crisis, Madden fired 53 staff and forced another five to resign, and decentralized the NLRB's trial process to give regional directors and field agents more authority. But the House still passed the Smith bill by a vote of 258 to 129 on June 7, 1940. To protect the NLRB, Roosevelt convinced Senator Elbert D. Thomas, Chairman of the Senate Committee on Education and Labor, to hold no hearings or votes on the bill, and the legislation died.

The Smith Committee investigation had a lasting effect on labor law in the U.S., and was the basis for the Taft–Hartley Act of 1947. Madden's term on the NLRB came to an end after just four years. On November 15, 1940, President Roosevelt nominated Harry A. Millis to the NLRB and named him chairman, and nominated Madden to a seat on the U.S. Court of Claims.

=== 1940–1945: Economics Division and World War II ===
Another major structural change occurred at the same time that Madden left the NLRB. The Smith Committee's anti-communist drive also targeted David J. Saposs, the NLRB chief industrial economist. Saposs had been surreptitiously assessed by members of the Communist Party USA for membership, and rejected as a prospect. But Smith and others attacked Saposs as a communist, and Congress defunded his division and his job on October 11, 1940. Although the Smith committee's investigation proved critical, the disestablishment of the Economic Division was due to many reasons—both internal and external to the NLRB, and only some of which involved allegations of communist infiltration. As historian James A. Gross observed:

The Division was eliminated for all kinds of reasons which had nothing to do with the merits and importance of its work: political pressures and maneuverings, jealousy and empire building between and among lawyers and economists inside the Board, opposition to leftist ideologies, a personal attack on the Chief Economist, David Saposs, and a mighty hostility to the administrative process.

The loss of the Economic Division was a major blow to the NLRB. It had a major tactical impact: Economic data helped the NLRB fulfill its adjudicatorial and prosecutorial work in areas such as unfair labor practices (ULPs), representation elections, and in determining remedial actions (such as reinstatement, back pay awards, and fines). Economic data also undermined employer resistance to the agency by linking that opposition to employer ULPs. The loss also left the board dependent on the biased information offered by the parties in dispute before it, leading to poor decision-making and far less success in the courts. It also had a major strategic impact: It left the board unable to determine whether its administration of the law was effective or not. Nor could the board determine whether labor unrest was a serious threat to the economy or not. As labor historian Josiah Bartlett Lambert put it: "Without the Economic Research Division, the NLRB could not undertake empirical studies to determine the actual impact of secondary boycotts, jurisdictional strikes, national emergency strikes, and the like." The Economic Division was critical to a long-range NLRB process to lead to the long-term evolution of industrial labor relations in the U.S., but that goal had to be abandoned. Most importantly, however, the evisceration of the Economic Division struck at the fundamental purpose of federal labor law, which was to allow experts to adjudicate labor disputes rather than use a legal process. With this data and analysis, widespread skepticism about the board's expertise quickly spread through Congress and the courts. It also left the board largely unable to engage in rulemaking, forcing it to make labor law on an inefficient, time-consuming case-by-case basis. As of 1981, NLRB was still the only federal agency forbidden to seek economic information about the impact of its activities.

The second chairman of the NLRB, Harry A. Millis, led the board in a much more moderate direction. Lacking an economic division to give it ammunition to fight with Millis deliberately made the NLRB dependent on Congress and the executive branch for its survival. Millis made a large number of organizational changes. He stripped the office of Secretary of its power, set up an Administrative Division to supervise the 22 regional offices, initiated a study of the board's administrative procedures, and genuinely delegated power to the regional offices. He removed casehandling and regional office communication from the jurisdiction of the Office of the Secretary and created a Field Division. He also adopted procedures requiring the board made its decisions based solely on the trial examiner's report, authorized NLRB review attorneys to review trial examiner report, required decisions to be drafted ahead of time and distributed for review, authorized review attorneys to revise drafts before a final decision was issued, required trial examiners to emphasize findings of fact and to address points of law, and began holding board meetings when there were differences of opinion over decisions.

Millis eliminated the Review Division's decisive role in cases, which had been established under Madden and Witt. Madden and Witt had adopted a highly centralized board structure so that (generally speaking) only the cases most favorable to the board made it to the courts. The centralized structure meant that only the strongest cases made it to national board, so that the board could apply all its economic and legal powers to crafting the best decision possible. This strategy enabled the NLRB to defend itself very well before the Supreme Court. But Madden and Witt had held on to the centralized strategy too long, and made political enemies in the process. Millis substituted a decentralized process in which the board was less a decision-maker and more a provider of services to the regions. Many of the changes Millis instituted were designed to mimic requirements placed on other agencies by the Administrative Procedure Act.

American entry into World War II on December 8, 1941, significantly changed the NLRB. On January 12, 1942, President Roosevelt created the National War Labor Board (NWLB), which displaced the NLRB as the main focus of federal labor relations for the duration of the war. The NWLB was given the authority to "finally determine" any labor dispute which threatened to interrupt war production, and to stabilize union wages and benefits during the war. Although Roosevelt instructed the NWLB not to intrude on jurisdiction exercised by the NLRB, the War Labor Board refused to honor this request. From 1942 to 1945, Millis tried to secure a jurisdictional agreement with NWLB chairman George W. Taylor. But these discussions proved fruitless, and Millis broke them off in June 1945. The NWLB also heavily raided the NLRB for staff, significantly hindering NLRB operations.

Additional changes came with the passage of the War Labor Disputes Act (WLDA) on June 25, 1943. Enacted over Roosevelt's veto after 400,000 coal miners, their wages significantly lower due to high wartime inflation, struck for a $2-a-day wage increase, the legislation (in part) required the NLRB to issue a ballot outlining all the collective bargaining proposals and counter-proposals, wait 30 days, and then hold a strike vote. The War Labor Disputes Act proved very burdensome. The NLRB processed 2,000 WLDA cases from 1943 to the end of 1945, of which 500 were strike votes. The act's strike vote procedures did little to stop strikes, however, and Millis feared unions were using the referendums to whip up pro-strike feelings among their members. Millis also believed the law's strike vote process permitted more strikes to occur than the NLRB would have allowed under its old procedures. There were so many strike vote filings in the six months after the war ended that NLRB actually shut down its long-distance telephone lines, cancelled all out of town travel, suspended all public hearings, and suspended all other business to accommodate the workload. By early 1945, Millis was in ill health. He resigned from the NLRB on June 7, 1945, and Paul M. Herzog was named his successor.

=== 1947–1965: Taft–Hartley ===
A major turning point in the history of the NLRB came in 1947 with passage of the Taft–Hartley Act. Disruptions caused by strikes during World War II as well as the huge wave of strikes that followed the end of the war fueled a growing movement in 1946 and 1947 to amend the NLRA to correct what critics saw as a pro-labor tilt in federal law. Drafted by the powerful Republican senator Robert A. Taft and the strongly anti-union representative Fred A. Hartley Jr., the Taft–Hartley Act banned jurisdictional strikes, wildcat strikes, political strikes, secondary boycotts, secondary picketing, mass picketing, union campaign donations made from dues money, the closed shop, and unions of supervisors. The act also enumerated new employer rights, defined union-committed ULPs, gave states the right to opt out of federal labor law through right-to-work laws, required unions to give an 80-days' strike notice in all cases, established procedures for the president to end a strike in a national emergency, and required all union officials to sign an anti-Communist oath. Organizationally, the act made the general counsel a presidential appointee, independent of the board itself, and gave the general counsel limited powers to seek injunctions without referring to the Justice Department. It also banned the NLRB from engaging in any mediation or conciliation, and formally enshrined in law the ban on hiring personnel to do economic data collection or analysis.

In August 1947, Robert N. Denham became the NLRB's general counsel. He held "conservative views" and wielded "considerable influence" on labor-management relations and interpretations of the newly passed Taft–Hartley Act. In 1950, US president Harry S. Truman fired Denham (The New York Times: "left at the behest of the President"). While NLRB general counsel, Denham received considerable news coverage as a "quasi-Republican". Nominated by President Truman, Denham received unanimous approval by the US Senate Labor Committee. He received "full and independent powers to investigate violations, file complaints and prosecute offenders before the board." In August 1947, he supported an "Anti-Red Affidavit Rule" and so sided with US senator Robert A. Taft. In October 1947, the NLRB overruled him, which meant that top officers of the American Federation of Labor (AFL) and Congress of Industrial Organizations (CIO) would not have to sign an anti-Communist oath per the Taft–Hartley Act.

Herzog publicly admitted the need for some change in the NLRA, but privately he opposed the proposed Taft–Hartley amendments. He felt the communist oath provisions were unconstitutional, that the amendments would turn the NLRA into a management weapon, that creation of an independent general counsel would weaken the NLRB, and that the law's dismantling of the agency's economic analysis unit deprived the NLRB of essential expertise. Nonetheless, Congress overrode Truman's veto of the Taft–Hartley Act on June 23, 1947, and the bill became law.

The Taft–Hartley Act fundamentally changed the nature of federal labor law, but it also seriously hindered the NLRB's ability to enforce the law. The loss of the mediation function left the NLRB unable to become involved in labor disputes, a function it had engaged in since its inception as the National Labor Board in 1933. This hindered the agency's efforts to study, analyze, and create bulwarks against bad-faith collective bargaining; reduced its ability to formulate national labor policy in this area; and left the agency making labor law on an ineffective, time-consuming case-by-case basis. The separation of the general counsel from supervision by the national board also had significant impact on the agency. This separation was enacted against the advice of the Justice Department, contradicted the policy Congress had enacted in the Administrative Procedure Act of 1946, and ignored Millis' extensive internal reforms. The change left the NLRB as the only federal agency unable to coordinate its decision-making and legal activities, and the only agency exempted in this manner under the Administrative Procedure Act. The separation of the general counsel was not discussed by the committee or by any witnesses during the legislation's mark-up. Indeed, there was no basis for it at all in the public record. It was, in the words of sociologist Robin Stryker, "little-noted" and "unprecedented".

The anti-communist oath provisions generated extensive public debate, and generated disputes before the Supreme Court several times. The Taft–Hartley oath first reached the court in American Communications Ass'n v. Douds, 339 U.S. 382 (1950), in which the court held 5-to-1 that the oath did not violate the First Amendment, was not an ex post facto law or bill of attainder in violation of Article One, Section 10, and was not a "test oath" in violation of Article Six. The issue again came before the court in Garner v. Board of Public Works, 341 U.S. 716 (1951), in which the court unanimously held that a municipal loyalty oath was not an ex post facto law or bill of attainder. It came before the court yet a third time in Wieman v. Updegraff, 344 U.S. 183 (1952). This time, the outcome was radically different. The Supreme Court unanimously ruled that state loyalty oath legislation violated the due process clause of the Fourteenth Amendment. In 1965, the Supreme Court held 5-to-4 that the anti-communist oath was a bill of attainder in United States v. Brown, 381 U.S. 437 (1965). The Supreme Court essentially overturned Douds, but did not formally do so.

In 1949, the NLRB instated the Joy Silk doctrine, which held that "if a union provides evidence that a majority of workers want to unionize", the employer should recognize the union unless they have "good faith doubt" regarding that evidence. Further, "if there's an unfair labor practice, meaning the employer broke the law, then it is presumed that the workers wanted to join a union". The doctrine was replaced by the Gissel doctrine in 1969 following NLRB v. Gissel Packing Co., Inc.

=== 1966–2007: Expansion of jurisdiction ===
In 1974, Congress amended the National Labor Relations Act to protect employees of non-profit hospitals and allow the board to adjudicate their claims. The 1935 Wagner Act had protected non-profit hospital workers, but the Taft–Hartley Act removed those protections in 1947. Congress had expressed concern about the impact of potential labor strikes on patient care, but decided that the proposed legislation was an appropriate compromise.

In July 1987, the board began work on a comprehensive regulation for collective-bargaining units in health care organizations. The board held 14 days of hearings and considered testimony from 144 witnesses and over 1,800 public comments, and finally issued the rule in April 1989. The rule was challenged in court and ultimately reached the Supreme Court, which unanimously upheld the rule in April 1991.

=== 2007–2014: Lack of quorum and legal challenges ===
From December 2007 to mid-July 2013, the agency never had all five members, and not once did it operate with three confirmed members, creating a legal controversy. Three members' terms expired in December 2007, leaving the NLRB with just two members—Chairman Wilma B. Liebman and Member Peter Schaumber. President George W. Bush refused to make some nominations to the board and Senate Democrats refused to confirm those which he did make.

On December 28, 2007, just before the board lost its quorum, the four members agreed to delegate their authority to a three-person panel per the National Labor Relations Act. Only Liebman and Schaumber remained on the board, but the board concluded that the two constituted a quorum of the three-person panel and thus could make decisions on behalf of the board. Liebman and Schaumber informally agreed to decide only those cases which were in their view noncontroversial and on which they could agree, and issued almost 400 decisions between January 2008 and September 2009.

In April 2009, President Obama nominated Craig Becker (associate general counsel of the Service Employees International Union), Mark Gaston Pearce (a member on the Industrial Board of Appeals, an agency of the New York State Department of Labor), and Brian Hayes (Republican Labor Policy Director for the Senate Committee on Health, Education, Labor and Pensions) to fill the three empty seats on the NLRB.

The U.S. Courts of Appeals for the First, Second, and Seventh Circuits upheld the two-member NLRB's authority to decide cases, while the U.S. Court of Appeals for the D.C. Circuit rejected its authority. In September 2009, the Justice Department asked the U.S. Supreme Court to immediately hear its appeal from the Seventh Circuit's decision in New Process Steel, L.P. v. NLRB and settle the dispute, given the high stakes involved. The Supreme Court granted certiorari in October and agreed to decide the issue.

Becker's nomination appeared to fail on February 8, 2010, after Republican Senators (led by John McCain) threatened to filibuster his nomination. President Obama said he would consider making recess appointments to the NLRB due to the Senate's failure to move on any of the three nominations. On March 27, 2010, Obama recess appointed Becker and Pearce.

On June 17, 2010, the Supreme Court ruled in New Process Steel, L. P. v. NLRB that the two-member Board had no authority to issue decisions, invalidating all rulings made by Liebman and Schaumber.

On June 22, 2010, a voice vote in the Senate confirmed Pearce to a full term, allowing him to serve until August 27, 2013. The same day, the Senate confirmed Republican nominee Brian Hayes of Massachusetts by voice vote. Effective August 28, 2011, Pearce was named chairman to replace Democrat Wilma Liebman, whose term had expired. Becker's term, as a recess appointee, ended on December 31, 2011. Hayes' term ended on December 16, 2012.

On January 4, 2012, Obama announced recess appointments to three seats on the board: Sharon Block, Terence F. Flynn, and Richard Griffin. The appointments were criticized by Republicans, including the House Speaker John Boehner, as unconstitutional and "a brazen attempt to undercut the role of the Senate to advise and consent the executive branch on appointments." Although made as recess appointments, critics questioned their legality, arguing that Congress had not officially been in recess as pro forma sessions had been held. Former U.S. attorney general Edwin Meese stated that in his opinion, since the appointments were made when the Senate was "demonstrably not in recess", they represented "a constitutional abuse of a high order." On January 12, 2012, the U.S. Justice Department released a memo stating that appointments made during pro forma sessions are supported by the Constitution and precedent.

On January 25, 2013, in Noel Canning v. NLRB, a panel of the D.C. Circuit ruled that President Obama's recess appointments were invalid as they were not made during an intersession recess of the Senate, and the President moved to fill them during the same recess. On May 16, 2013, in National Labor Relations Board v. New Vista Nursing and Rehabilitation, the U.S. Court of Appeals for the Third Circuit became the second federal appellate court to rule that the recess appointments to the NLRB were unconstitutional. In a split decision, it also found that the March 27, 2010, recess appointment of Craig Becker was unconstitutional.

On July 14, 2013, Senate majority leader Harry Reid threatened to exercise the "nuclear option" and allow a simple majority (rather than a supermajority) of the Senate to end a filibuster. This threat to end the filibuster's privileged position in the Senate was intended to end Republican filibustering of NLRB nominees. On July 16, 2013, President Obama and Senate Republicans reached an agreement to end the impasse over NLRB appointees. Obama withdrew the pending nominations of Block and Griffin, and submit two new nominees: Nancy Schiffer, associate general counsel at the AFL-CIO, and Kent Hirozawa, chief counsel to NLRB chairman Mark Gaston Pearce. Republicans agreed not to oppose a fourth nominee, to be submitted in 2014.

On July 30, 2013, the Senate confirmed all five of Obama's nominees for the NLRB: Kent Hirozawa, Harry I. Johnson III, Philip A. Miscimarra, Mark Gaston Pearce and Nancy Schiffer. Johnson and Miscimarra represented the Republican nominees for the board. Pearce was confirmed for a second five-year term.

On June 26, 2014, in National Labor Relations Board v. Noel Canning, the U.S. Supreme Court unanimously ruled that President Obama's recess appointments to the NLRB in 2013 were unconstitutional, affirming the D.C. Circuit's decision in Noel Canning v. NLRB.

Nancy Schiffer's term ended on December 15, 2014. She was succeeded by Lauren McFerran on December 16, 2014. Harry I. Johnson III's term ended on August 27, 2015.

=== 2015–2024 ===
In an August 2016 case between Columbia University and a union Graduate Workers of Columbia, the NLRB ruled that graduate students who worked as teaching or research assistants at private universities have the right to unionize under federal labor law.

In 2017, the NLRB's leadership shifted when President Donald Trump nominated and the Senate confirmed new members, changing the board's composition to a 3–2 Republican majority. In December, the NLRB overturned an Obama-era decision that expanded the joint employer standard, which held employers liable for labor violations committed by their subcontractors or franchisees. However, this decision was later vacated due to an ethical conflict because board member William Emanuel had ties to one of the law firms arguing the case. The NLRB also issued a decision in the Boeing Company case which made it easier for employers to justify policies that restrict employees' rights to engage in protected concerted activity.

In January 2019, the NLRB issued a decision that clarified the test for determining whether workers are independent contractors or employees under the National Labor Relations Act (NLRA).

In 2020, the NLRB created a rule codifying the joint employer standard that had been overturned in 2017, making it easier for employees to hold companies liable for labor violations committed by their subcontractors or franchisees.

In 2023, in response to the company Cemex having been found guilty of illegal labor practices by interfering with a union election, the NLRB instated a new policy meant to deter election interference. Under the new policy if a majority of workers demonstrate support for a union, the company must recognize them or ask the NLRB to conduct an election. However, if they commit unfair labor practices, the union will automatically be recognized, and the company will be required to bargain. This differs from the then-defunct Joy Silk standard, which had required employers to recognize a union unless they had a good-faith doubt that the union had majority employee support. Nonetheless, Cemex was noted as a significant strengthening of union protections and a partial revival of Joy Silk.

In 2024, SpaceX, Amazon, and Trader Joe's argued in various court filings that the NLRB was unconstitutional by the theory that it violates separation of powers and due process.

In December 2024, in a constitutional challenge to the NLRB's structure, the United States District Court for the District of Columbia ruled that the NLRB judges’ layered removal protections against being fired by the president violate the U.S. Constitution.

=== 2025–present ===
After taking office, Trump fired two NLRB officials, including board member Gwynne Wilcox, the first NLRB member to be fired in the 90 years of the agency' existence. This action not only caused the board to fall below its quorum (of three members), but it may also have violated the National Labor Relations Act, as board members are only supposed to be removed by the president for "neglect of duty or malfeasance in office". As of mid-February 2025, the board had not said publicly when it intended to have a quorum again. All NLRB investigations, including 24 into Elon Musk's companies, cannot move forward until Trump nominates new members. On February 5, 2025, Wilcox filed suit against Trump and NLRB chair Marvin Kaplan challenging her removal, and on March 6, Judge Beryl Howell ruled that Trump's action was null and void and Wilcox was effectively reinstated. On April 9 the Supreme Court issued a temporary administrative stay of the reinstatement.

In early March, the NLRB came under targeting by the Department of Government Efficiency, who with law enforcement escort, accessed the board's databases for information, including sensitive information on unionizing employees, ongoing legal cases, labor investigations, and corporate secrets. IT staff on site were given little indication of what was happening apart from that DOGE demanded top level IT access to read, write, and copy data unrestricted; before said IT staff were told to stay out of DOGE's way. DOGE engineers then shortly thereafter installed a 'container', which allowed engineers backdoor access and to work invisibly. DOGE then proceeded to attempt to cover their tracks by turning off monitoring tools and deleting records of their access. Soon after, the NLRB began detecting suspicious login attempts from Russian IP addresses; twenty attempts using the precise login credentials created by DOGE began within 15 minutes of the accounts being set up. The whistle blower also revealed that he had received a threatening note, including apparent drone photos of him walking his dog.

The IT team subsequently tried to launch a formal security breach investigation, requesting help from the Cybersecurity and Infrastructure Security Agency in the process; however these efforts were quickly disrupted without explanation.

Tim Bearese, the NLRB's acting press secretary, issued a statement denying that DOGE had ever requested or been granted access to the NLRB's systems, and that no security breaches had occurred. White House spokesperson Anna Kelly subsequently stated that DOGE employees were active in a number of federal agencies, including the NLRB

== Structure ==
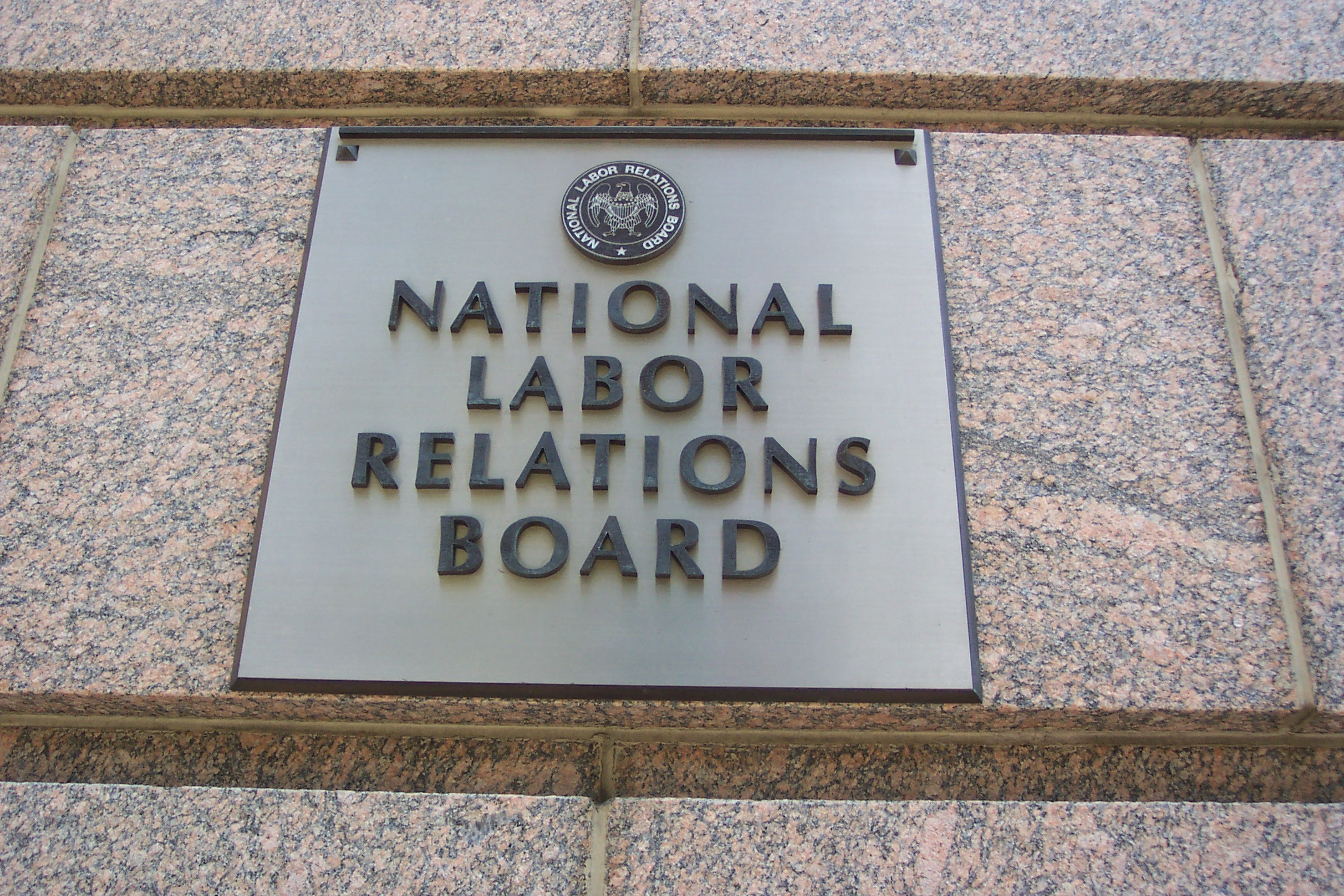
Plaque on the exterior of 1099 14th Street NW in Washington, D.C., the NLRB headquarters as of 2013

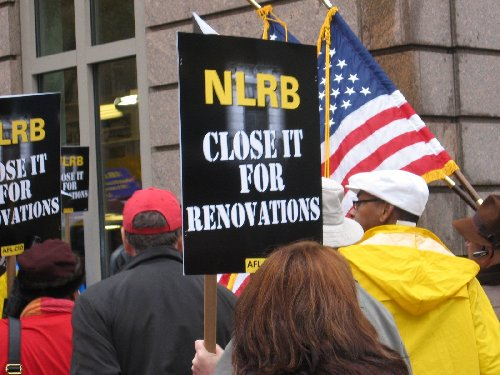
Union members picketing NLRB rulings outside the agency's Washington, D.C., headquarters in November 2007

In 1947, the Taft–Hartley Act created a formal administrative distinction between the board and the general counsel of the NLRB. In broad terms, the general counsel is responsible for investigating and prosecuting unfair labor practice claims and for the general supervision of the NLRB field offices. The general counsel is appointed by the president to a four-year term and independent from the board; it has limited independence to argue for a change in the law in presenting cases to the board. The general counsel oversees four divisions: the Division of Operations Management, the Division of Administration, the Division of Advice, and the Division of Enforcement Litigation.

The board, on the other hand, is the adjudicative body that decides the unfair labor practice cases brought to it. Once the board has decided the issue, it is the general counsel's responsibility to uphold the board's decision, even if it is contrary to the position it advocated when presenting the case to the board. The board is also responsible for the administration of the act's provisions governing the holding of elections and resolution of jurisdictional disputes. It is a reactive and not a proactive power. The NLRB rarely promulgates administrative rules.

The board has more than thirty regional offices. The regional offices conduct elections, investigate unfair labor practice charges, and make the initial determination on those charges (whether to dismiss, settle, or issue complaints). The board has jurisdiction to hold elections and prosecute violations of the act in Puerto Rico and American Samoa.

=== Jurisdiction ===
The board's jurisdiction is limited to private sector employees and the United States Postal Service; other than Postal Service employees, it has no authority over labor relations disputes involving governmental, railroad and airline employees covered by the Adamson Railway Labor Act, or agricultural employees. On the other hand, in those parts of the private sector its jurisdictional standards are low enough to reach almost all employers whose business has any appreciable impact on interstate commerce.

=== Processing of charges ===
Charges are filed by parties against unions or employers with the appropriate regional office. The regional office will investigate the complaint. If a violation is believed to exist, the region will take the case before an administrative law judge who will conduct a hearing. The decision of the administrative law judge may be reviewed by the five member board. Board decisions are reviewable by United States Courts of Appeals. The board's decisions are not self-executing: it must seek court enforcement in order to force a recalcitrant party to comply with its orders. (For greater detail on this process see the entry for unfair labor practice.)

== General counsel ==
Lafe Solomon was named acting general counsel on June 21, 2010. His nomination was sent to the Senate on January 5, 2011. Solomon's authority came into question on August 13, 2013, when Judge Benjamin Settle for the United States District Court for the Western District of Washington denied a petition for injunctive relief, ruling that Solomon had not been properly appointed under the Federal Vacancies Reform Act of 1998 (FVRA). Although other district courts had enforced Solomon's requests, Settle's decision called into question all of Solomon's activity since June 21, 2010, focusing on subsections (a)(1) and (2) of the FVRA; some pundits claimed that Solomon's appointment was allowed under subsection (a)(3). President Obama withdrew Solomon's nomination.

On July 31, 2013, President Obama nominated former NLRB nominee Richard Griffin as general counsel, calling Griffin "a kind of prosecutor at the board" who would fill "one of the most critical roles at the agency." The Senate approved Griffin's nomination on October 29, 2013, by a vote of 55 to 44.

Peter B. Robb was nominated by President Donald Trump in September 2017 and was confirmed by the U.S. Senate on November 8, 2017. He was sworn in as general counsel of the National Labor Relations Board on November 17, 2017, for a four-year term. Immediately following President Joe Biden's inauguration on January 20, 2021, the White House sent a letter to Robb requesting his resignation. Just hours later, Robb refused. He was fired that evening. Unions had wished for Robb to be replaced so that previous agency procedure could be restored; supporters of the firing argued that it was legal, citing the recent Supreme Court decision in Seila Law LLC v. Consumer Financial Protection Bureau (2020). The general counsel had never been fired previously.

On January 25, 2021, President Biden appointed Peter Sung Ohr, a veteran employee of the NLRB, to serve as acting general counsel. On February 17, 2021, Biden nominated Jennifer Abruzzo, a former acting general counsel of the NLRB, to serve as the new general counsel. Her nomination was confirmed by the Senate on July 21, 2021, in a 51–50 vote, with Vice President Kamala Harris breaking the tie in her favor. Her four-year team in office began on July 22, 2021.

== Board members ==
=== Current board members ===
The current board members as of August 17, 2026:

Position	Member	Party	Entered office	Term expires	Appointed by
Chairman	James Murphy	Republican	January 7, 2026	December 16, 2027	Donald Trump
Member	David Prouty	Democratic	August 28, 2021	August 27, 2031	Joe Biden; Donald Trump
Member	Scott Mayer	Republican	January 7, 2026	December 16, 2029	Donald Trump
Member	James Macy	Republican	August 17, 2026	August 27, 2030	Donald Trump
Member	Vacant (Note: Gwynne Wilcox was fired by Trump. She is contesting her firing in court.)	—N/a	—	August 27, 2028	—

=== Recent appointments ===
==== Donald Trump’s appointments ====
On January 25, 2017, President Donald Trump appointed Philip Miscimarra the acting chairman of the NLRB. Miscimarra's term expired on December 16, 2017. Marvin Kaplan succeeded him as NLRB chairman on December 21, 2017. Kaplan was replaced as chairman in April 2018 by John F. Ring.

President Trump announced on March 2, 2020, that he would renominate Republican Marvin Kaplan and Democrat Lauren McGarity McFerran to seats on the board. On July 29, 2020, Kaplan was confirmed by the Senate by a vote of 52–46 to a second term of five years expiring August 27, 2025, and McFerran was confirmed by the Senate by a vote of 53–42 to a second term of five years expiring December 16, 2024.

In his second term, President Trump nominated Scott Mayer and James Murphy in July 2025 to fill two vacant seats on the NLRB. On December 18, 2025, the Senate confirmed both Mayer and Murphy, restoring a quorum to the NLRB.

==== Joe Biden's appointments ====
On January 20, 2021, President Joe Biden appointed Democratic member Lauren McFerran as chair of the NLRB.

Biden subsequently nominated Gwynne Wilcox to fill the then vacant Carmody seat on the board and David Prouty to replace William Emanuel as holder of the Smith seat when the latter's term expires in August 2021. Both nominees have strong ties to organized labor and have represented unions. They received Senate confirmation on July 28, 2021. On September 6, 2023, Wilcox was confirmed by the Senate for a second 5-year term.

=== Past board members ===
Name	Party	Term start	Term end
Edwin S. Smith	Democratic	August 27, 1935	August 27, 1941
J. Warren Madden	Democratic	August 27, 1935	August 26, 1940
John M. Carmody	Democratic	August 27, 1935	August 31, 1936
Donald Wakefield Smith	Democratic	September 23, 1936	May 31, 1939
William M. Leiserson	Democratic	June 1, 1939	February 23, 1943
Harry A. Millis	Democratic	November 26, 1940	July 4, 1945
Gerard D. Reilly	Republican	October 11, 1941	August 26, 1946
John M. Houston	Democratic	March 15, 1943	August 27, 1953
Paul M. Herzog	Democratic	July 5, 1945	June 30, 1953
James J. Reynolds	Republican	August 28, 1946	December 31, 1951
Abe Murdock	Democratic	August 1, 1947	December 16, 1957
J. Copeland Gray	Republican	August 1, 1947	December 16, 1949
Paul L. Styles	Democratic	February 27, 1950	August 31, 1953
Ivar H. Peterson	Republican	March 21, 1952	August 27, 1956
Guy Otto Farmer	Republican	July 13, 1953	August 27, 1963
Philip Ray Rodgers	Republican	August 28, 1953	August 27, 1963
Albert C. Beeson	Republican	March 2, 1954	December 16, 1954
Boyd S. Leedom	Republican	April 4, 1955	December 16, 1964
Stephen S. Bean	Republican	December 1, 1955	August 27, 1960
Joseph Alton Jenkins	Democratic	March 28, 1957	March 27, 1961
John H. Fanning	Democratic	December 20, 1957	December 16, 1982
Arthur A. Kimball	Republican	September 13, 1960	March 6, 1961
Frank W. McCulloch	Democratic	March 7, 1961	August 27, 1970
Gerald A. Brown	Democratic	April 14, 1961	August 27, 1971
Howard Jenkins Jr.	Republican	August 28, 1963	August 27, 1983
Sam Zaogria	Republican	April 20, 1965	December 16, 1969
Edward Miller	Republican	June 3, 1970	December 16, 1974
Ralph E. Kennedy	Republican	December 14, 1970	July 31, 1975
John A. Penello	Democratic	February 22, 1972	January 14, 1981
Betty S. Murphy	Republican	February 18, 1975	December 14, 1979
Peter D. Walther	Republican	November 26, 1957	August 31, 1977
John C. Truesdale (Note: When a member has served multiple terms, the terms are shown together by default for clarity.)	Democratic	October 25, 1977	August 27, 1980
John C. Truesdale	Democratic	October 23, 1980	January 26, 1981
John C. Truesdale	Democratic	January 24, 1994	March 3, 1994
John C. Truesdale	Democratic	December 24, 1994	January 3, 1996
John C. Truesdale	Democratic	December 4, 1998	October 1, 2001
Don A. Zimmerman	Independent	September 17, 1980	December 16, 1984
Robert P. Hunter	Republican	August 14, 1981	August 27, 1985
John R. Van de Water	Republican	August 18, 1981	December 16, 1982
John C. Miller	Republican	December 23, 1982	March 7, 1983
Donald L. Dotson	Republican	March 7, 1983	December 16, 1987
Patricia Diaz Dennis	Democratic	May 5, 1983	June 24, 1986
Wilford W. Johnson	Republican	May 28, 1985	June 15, 1989
Marshall B. Babson	Democratic	July 1, 1985	July 31, 1988
James M. Stephens	Republican	October 16, 1985	August 27, 1995
Mary M. Carcraft	Democratic	November 7, 1986	August 27, 1991
John E. Higgins Jr.	Republican	August 29, 1988	November 22, 1989
John E. Higgins Jr.	Republican	September 3, 1996	November 13, 1997
Dennis M. Devaney	Democratic	November 22, 1988	December 16, 1994
Clifford R. Oviatt	Republican	December 14, 1989	May 28, 1993
John N. Raudabaugh	Republican	August 27, 1990	November 26, 1993
John C. Truesdale	Democratic	December 23, 1994	January 3, 1996
John C. Truesdale	Democratic	December 4, 1998	October 1, 2001
William B. Gould IV	Democratic	March 7, 1994	August 27, 1998
Margaret A. Browning	Democratic	March 9, 1994	February 28, 1997
Charles I. Cohen	Republican	March 18, 1994	August 27, 1996
Sarah M. Fox	Democratic	February 2, 1996	December 15, 2020
Joseph Robert Brame III	Republican	November 17, 1997	August 27, 2000
Peter J. Hurtgen	Republican	November 14, 1997	August 27, 2001
Peter J. Hurtgen	Republican	August 31, 2001	August 1, 2002
Wilma B. Liebman	Democratic	November 14, 1997	August 27, 2011
Dennis P. Walsh	Democratic	December 30, 2000	December 20, 2001
Dennis P. Walsh	Democratic	December 17, 2002	December 16, 2004
Dennis P. Walsh	Democratic	January 17, 2006	December 31, 2007
Michael J. Bartlett	Republican	January 22, 2002	November 22, 2002
William B. Cowen	Republican	January 22, 2002	November 22, 2002
Alexander Acosta	Republican	December 17, 2002	August 21, 2003
Robert J. Battista	Republican	December 17, 2002	December 16, 2007
Peter C. Schaumber	Republican	December 17, 2002	August 27, 2005
Peter C. Schaumber	Republican	September 1, 2005	August 27, 2010
Ronald E. Meisburg	Republican	January 12, 2004	December 8, 2004
Peter Kirsanow	Republican	January 4, 2006	December 31, 2007
Craig Becker	Democratic	April 5, 2010	January 3, 2012
Mark Gaston Pearce	Democratic	April 7, 2010	August 27, 2018
Brian Hayes	Republican	June 29, 2010	December 16, 2012
Sharon Block	Democratic	January 9, 2012	August 2, 2013
Terence F. Flynn	Republican	January 9, 2012	July 24, 2012
Richard F. Griffin Jr.	Democratic	January 9, 2012	August 2, 2013
Nancy J. Schiffer	Democratic	August 2, 2013	December 15, 2014
Kent Y. Hirozawa	Democratic	August 5, 2013	August 27, 2016
Philip A. Miscimarra	Republican	August 7, 2013	December 16, 2017
Harry I. Johnson III	Republican	August 12, 2013	August 27, 2015
Lauren McFerran	Democratic	December 16, 2014	December 16, 2019
Marvin Kaplan	Republican	August 10, 2017	August 27, 2025
William Emanuel	Republican	September 28, 2017	August 27, 2021
John F. Ring	Republican	April 16, 2018	December 16, 2022
Lauren McFerran	Democratic	July 29, 2020	December 16, 2024
Gwynne Wilcox	Democratic	August 4, 2021	August 27, 2023
Gwynne Wilcox	Democratic	September 11, 2023	January 27, 2025

=== Chair ===
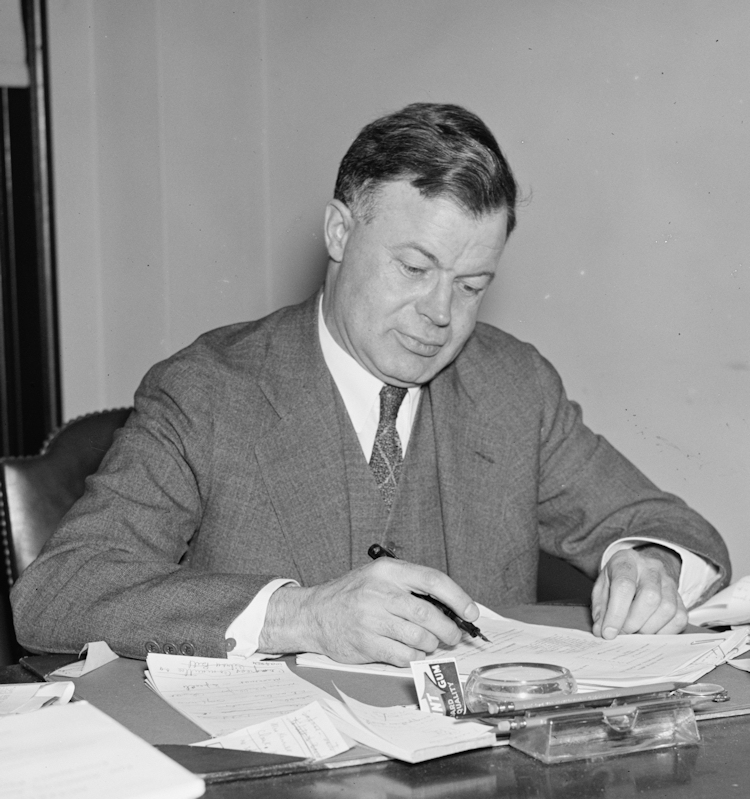
J. Warren Madden, the first chairman of the NLRB, working at his desk at the NLRB in Washington, D.C., in June 1937

The president designates one member of the board to serve as chairman. Chairmen serve at the pleasure of the president, and the president can designate another member as chairman at any time. The chairman's powers are limited. The chairman, like other board members, has a chief legal counsel and a legal staff. Except for certain limited and purely administrative functions (such as being the recipient of appeals or Freedom of Information Act requests), one former NLRB chairman has said "the chairmanship—given the authority of the general counsel to appoint regional staff and recommend regional directors to the entire board (not just to the chairman)—is more like a bully pulpit than a position of authority." The chairman does, however, work with the Office of Management and Budget to craft the NLRB's budget proposal to Congress, may propose to the board changes to NLRB procedures and guidance manuals, and may propose that the board engage in rulemaking.

From 1935 to 1953, it was customary for the chairman (like all members of the NLRB) to be a neutral career government employee rather than an advocate of either labor unions or management. President Dwight Eisenhower's appointment of Guy Farmer in 1953 broke this two-decade-old tradition (Farmer was a management attorney). (Note: Five of President Eisenhower's appointees to the Board during his administration were neutral career bureaucrats, while two were management-side attorneys. Eisenhower also broke the tradition of appointing neutral parties to the position of General Counsel of the NLRB, appointing three management-side attorneys and one career government attorney to the position. See: Gross, James A. Broken Promise: The Subversion of U.S. Labor Relations Policy, 1947–1994. Philadelphia, Pa.: Temple University Press, 2003. ISBN 1-59213-225-1; Flynn, "A Quiet Revolution at the Labor Board: The Transformation of the NLRB, 1935–2000," Ohio State Law Journal, 2000.) Presidents John F. Kennedy and Lyndon B. Johnson both returned to the tradition of appointing neutral third parties to the position of board chairman, but President Richard M. Nixon appointed a management-side attorney. The board as a whole was under intense Congressional scrutiny from its inception until the 1960s. This ended in the 1960s and 1970s, but resumed in the 1980s. Subsequent appointments to the position of chairman have been heavily partisan and from either a strongly pro-union or pro-management position.

Chairpersons
Name	Party	Term start	Term end	Notes
J. Warren Madden	Democratic	August 27, 1935	August 26, 1940	
Harry A. Millis	Democratic	November 26, 1940	July 4, 1945	
Paul M. Herzog	Democratic	July 5, 1945	June 30, 1953	
Guy Farmer	Republican	July 13, 1953	August 27, 1955	
Boyd Leedom	Republican	November 2, 1955	March 6, 1961	(Note: Boyd S. Leedom also served as a Member of the NLRB from April 4, 1955, to December 16, 1964.)
Frank W. McCulloch	Democratic	March 7, 1961	June 2, 1970	
Edward B. Miller	Republican	June 3, 1970	December 16, 1974	
John H. Fanning	Republican	February 19, 1974	February 19, 1975	
John H. Fanning	Republican	April 14, 1977	August 14, 1981	(Note: John H. Fanning also served as a Member of the NLRB from December 20, 1957, to December 16, 1982.)
Betty S. Murphy	Republican	February 18, 1975	April 13, 1977	(Note: Betty S. Murphy also served as a Member of the NLRB from February 18, 1975, to December 14, 1979.)
John R. Van de Water	Republican	August 18, 1981	December 16, 1982	
John C. Miller	Republican	December 27, 1982	March 7, 1983	(Note: John C. Miller also served as a Member of the NLRB from December 23, 1982, to March 7, 1983.)
Donald L. Dotson	Republican	March 7, 1983	December 16, 1987	
James M. Stephens	Republican	December 17, 1987	March 6, 1994	(Note: James M. Stephens also served as a Member of the NLRB from October 16, 1985, to August 27, 1995.)
William B. Gould IV	Democratic	March 7, 1994	August 27, 1998	(Note: William B. Gould IV also served as a Member of the NLRB from March 7, 1994, to August 27, 1998.)
John C. Truesdale	Democratic	December 4, 1998	May 14, 2001	(Note: John C. Truesdale also served as a Member of the NLRB on several occasions: October 25, 1977, to August 27, 1980; October 23, 1980, to January 26, 1981; January 24, 1994, to March 3, 1994; December 23, 1994, to January 3, 1996; and December 4, 1998, to October 1, 2001. Truesdale served as Chairman under a recess appointment from December 4, 1998, to November 19, 1999. He was confirmed by the U.S. Senate on November 19, 1999, and resigned as Chairman on May 14, 2001. He continued to serve as a Member of the NLRB until October 1, 2001.)
Peter J. Hurtgen	Republican	May 16, 2001	August 1, 2002	(Note: Peter J. Hurtgen also served as a Member of the NLRB from November 14, 1997, to August 1, 2002. Hurtgen served as Chairman under a recess appointment from May 15, 2001.)
Robert J. Battista	Republican	December 17, 2002	December 16, 2007	
Peter B. Schaumber	Republican	March 19, 2008	January 19, 2009	(Note: Peter C. Schaumber also served as a Member of the NLRB from December 17, 2002 to August 27, 2005, and again from September 1, 2005 to August 27, 2010.)
Wilma B. Liebman	Democratic	January 20, 2009	August 27, 2011	(Note: Wilma B. Liebman also served as a Member of the NLRB from November 14, 1997, to January 19, 2009.)
Mark G. Pearce	Democratic	August 28, 2011	January 22, 2017	(Note: Mark Gaston Pearce served a recess appointment as a Member of the NLRB from April 7, 2010, to June 21, 2010. He was confirmed by the Senate to a five-year term on June 22, 2010. He was confirmed to a second five-year term on July 30, 2013, for a second term to expire on August 27, 2018.)
Philip A. Miscimarra	Republican	April 24, 2017	December 16, 2017	(Note: Acting from January 23, 2017 to April 23, 2017)
Marvin Kaplan	Republican	December 21, 2017	April 15, 2018	
John F. Ring	Republican	April 16, 2018	January 20, 2021	
Lauren McFerran	Democratic	January 20, 2021	December 16, 2024	
Gwynne Wilcox	Democratic	December 17, 2024	January 20, 2025	
Marvin Kaplan	Republican	January 20, 2025	August 27, 2025	
James Murphy	Republican	March 26, 2026	present	

== See also ==
- Federal Labor Relations Authority
- Federal Mediation and Conciliation Service (United States)
- List of chairmen of the National Labor Relations Board
- NLRB election procedures
- Subpoena ad testificandum
- Subpoena duces tecum
- Title 29 of the Code of Federal Regulations
- Union organizer
- Blue Man Vegas, LLC v. NLRB (2008)

== General references ==
- Atleson, James B. (January 1, 1998). Labor and the Wartime State: Labor Relations and Law During World War II. University of Illinois Press. ISBN 978-0-252-06674-0. OCLC 605496878.
- Baker, Thomas E.; Stack, John F. (2006). At War with Civil Rights and Civil Liberties. Rowman & Littlefield Publishers. ISBN 978-0-7425-3599-2. OCLC 646057221.
- Bernstein, Irving; Piven, Frances Fox (1969). The Turbulent Years: A History of the American Worker, 1933-1941. Haymarket Books. ISBN 978-1-60846-064-9. OCLC 776982985.
- Chasse, J. Dennis (February 21, 2011). "John R. Commons and His Students: The View From the End of the Twentieth Century". In Rutherford, Malcolm (ed.). The Institutionalist Movement in American Economics, 1918–1947: Science and Social Control. Cambridge University Press. ISBN 978-1-139-49756-5. OCLC 474282342.
- Dubofsky, Melvyn; Dulles, Foster Rhea (January 2004). Labor in America: A History. Harlan Davidson. ISBN 978-0-88295-998-6. OCLC 300754496.
- Eisner, Marc Allen (November 1, 2010). From Warfare State to Welfare State: World War I, Compensatory State-Building, and the Limits of the Modern Order. Penn State Press. ISBN 978-0-271-04350-0. OCLC 49414683.
- Eisner, Marc Allen (2000). Regulatory Politics in Transition. JHU Press. ISBN 978-0-8018-6492-6.
- Gall, Gilbert J. (1999). Pursuing Justice: Lee Pressman, the New Deal, and the CIO. SUNY Press. ISBN 978-0-7914-4103-9. OCLC 43476605.
- Gross, James A. (June 10, 2010). Broken Promise: The Subversion Of U.S. Labor Relations. Temple University Press. ISBN 978-1-4399-0370-4. OCLC 693761467.
- Gross, James A. (1974). The Making of the National Labor Relations Board: A Study in Economics, Politics, and the Law: Volume 1 (1933-1937). SUNY Press. ISBN 978-0-87395-271-2. OCLC 505722441.
- Gross, James A. (1981). Reshaping of the National Labor Relations Board: A Study in Economics, Politics, and the Law. Albany, NY: SUNY Press. OCLC 555229476.
- Jacobs, Meg (February 20, 2007). Pocketbook Politics: Economic Citizenship in Twentieth-Century America. Princeton University Press. ISBN 978-1-4008-4378-7.
- Karatnycky, Adrian (2000). Freedom in the World: The Annual Survey of Political Rights and Civil Liberties, 2000-2001. Transaction Publishers. ISBN 978-1-4128-5008-7.
- Lambert, Josiah Bartlett (2005). "If the Workers Took a Notion": The Right to Strike and American Political Development. Cornell University Press. ISBN 0-8014-8945-8.
- Lee, R. Alton (1980). Truman and Taft Hartley: A Question of Mandate. Greenwood Publishing Group, Incorporated. ISBN 978-0-313-22618-2.
- Luff, Jennifer (2007). "LaFollette Civil Liberties Committee". In Arnesen, Eric (ed.). Encyclopedia of U.S. Labor and Working-class History. Vol. 1. Taylor & Francis. ISBN 978-0-415-96826-3.
- Malsberger, John William (2000). From Obstruction to Moderation: The Transformation of Senate Conservatism, 1938-1952. Susquehanna University Press. ISBN 978-1-57591-026-0.
- Morris, Charles J. (2005). The Blue Eagle at Work: Reclaiming Democratic Rights in the American Workplace. Cornell University Press. ISBN 0-8014-4317-2.
- Rabinowitz, Victor (1996). Unrepentant Leftist: A Lawyer's Memoir. University of Illinois Press. ISBN 978-0-252-02253-1.
- Schlesinger, Arthur Meier (2003). The Coming of the New Deal, 1933-1935. Houghton Mifflin Harcourt. ISBN 0-618-34086-6.
- Storrs, Landon R.Y. (2013). The Second Red Scare and the Unmaking of the New Deal Left. Princeton University Press. ISBN 978-0-691-15396-4.
- Stryker, Robin (June 1, 1989). "Limits on Technocratization of the Law: The Elimination of the National Labor Relations Board's Division of Economic Research". American Sociological Review. 54 (3): 341–358. doi:10.2307/2095610. JSTOR 2095610.
- Tomlins, Christopher (1985). The State and the Unions: Labor Relations, Law, and the Organized Labor Movement in America, 1880-1960. Cambridge University.
- Trottman, Melanie; Maher, Kris (March 9–10, 2013). "Companies Challenge Labor Rulings". The Wall Street Journal (paper). pp. A1–A2.
- Vittoz, Stanley (1987). New Deal labor policy and the American industrial economy. University of North Carolina Press. ISBN 978-0-8078-1729-2.
- Fischer, Fredric H.; Brent, Garren; and Truesdale, John C., eds. How to Take A Case Before the NLRB. 8th ed. Washington, D.C.: Bureau of National Affairs, 2008.
- Gould IV, William B. Labored Relations: Law, Politics, and the NLRB. Cambridge, Mass.: MIT Press, 2001.
