= Lafe Solomon =

American lawyer

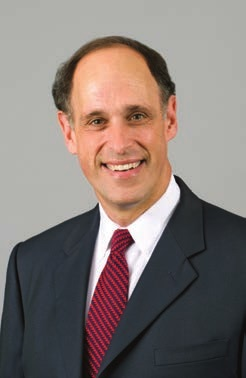

Acting General Counsel of the National Labor Relations Board
- In office June 21, 2010 – August 1, 2013
- Preceded by: Ronald Meisburg
- Succeeded by: Richard Griffin, Jr.

Lafe E. Solomon was named the Acting General Counsel of the National Labor Relations Board (NLRB) on June 21, 2010, by President Barack Obama. His nomination to serve as General Counsel was sent to the U.S. Senate on January 5, 2011. On August 1, 2013, President Obama withdrew his nomination, instead choosing to nominate Richard Griffin, Jr. for the position. The action came about as a result of a compromise between Senate Republicans and the White House concerning nominations to the NLRB.

Solomon began his NLRB career as a field examiner in 1972. After pursuing a Juris Doctor degree, he returned to the Agency as an attorney in the Office of Appeals. He transferred to the Appellate Court Branch in 1979. Two years later, he joined the staff of former Board Member Don Zimmerman. He went on to work for another nine board members, including Donald L. Dotson, Robert Hunter, John Higgins, James Stephens, Mary Cracraft, John Raudabaugh, William Gould, Sarah Fox and Wilma Liebman.

A native of Helena, Arkansas, Solomon received a B.A. degree in economics from Brown University in 1970 and a J.D. from Tulane University in 1976.

== Boeing ==
On April 20, 2011, Solomon announced that the NLRB had issued an unfair labor practice complaint against Boeing, alleging the company violated the NLRA (National Labor Relations Act) "by deciding to transfer [from Puget Sound, Washington] a second production line to a non-union facility in South Carolina for discriminatory reasons". The company had announced its plan to assemble seven 787 Dreamliner airplanes per month at its unionized facility, which has 12,000 employees. Boeing later announced that it would create a second production line to assemble an additional three planes per month at a non-union facility in South Carolina. The complaint alleged that media interviews given by company executives citing employees' costly past strikes and the possibility of future strikes as the overriding factors in deciding to locate the second line in the non-union facility comprised the "discriminatory reasons" for the NLRB complaint, although the company said no job losses would occur in Washington.

The reasoning employed by the NLRB was labeled "unprecedented" by some and "relatively straightforward" by others. The remedy being sought by the NLRB is an order that would require Boeing to maintain the second production line in Washington State. The complaint does not seek closure of the South Carolina facility, nor does it prohibit Boeing from assembling planes there, according to the Board's press release, although that would have been the effective result had the NLRB prevailed, in which case Boeing could have appealed through federal courts all the way to the Supreme Court.

An agreement on a new contract with Boeing's machinists' union paved the way to end the complaint on December 9, 2011, when the NLRB withdrew its complaint. The terms included assurances that a revamped version of the 737 jet will be built in Everett, Washington. After the union's members ratified the plan on December 7, 2011, the NLRB complaint was withdrawn. Boeing will not be required to build Dreamliners in Everett to make up for work placed in South Carolina, as the NLRB had initially demanded. Union leaders cited the new plant as a reason to ratify the labor accord, saying they knew "the company could and would move work again if the relationship didn't change".
