= Frank W. McCulloch =

American lawyer

Chair of the National Labor Relations Board
- In office March 7, 1961 – June 2, 1970
- President: John F. Kennedy; Lyndon B. Johnson; Richard Nixon
- Preceded by: Boyd Leedom
- Succeeded by: Edward B. Miller

Personal details
- Born: September 30, 1905 Evanston, Illinois, U.S.
- Died: July 6, 1996 (aged 90) Charlottesville, Virginia
- Party: Democratic
- Education: Williams College; Harvard Law School

Frank W. McCulloch (born September 30, 1905-July 6, 1996) was an American lawyer who served as the Chairman of the National Labor Relations Board from 1961 to 1970. He would also serve as a faculty member at Roosevelt University and University of Virginia School of Law.
