= Ronald Meisburg =

American labor lawyer (1947–2023)

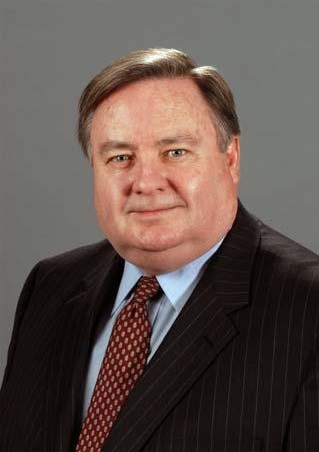

General Counsel of the National Labor Relations Board
- In office January 4, 2006 – June 20, 2010
- President: George W. Bush; Barack Obama
- Preceded by: Arthur F. Rosenfeld
- Succeeded by: Lafe Solomon (acting)

Member of the National Labor Relations Board
- In office January 12, 2004 – December 8, 2004
- President: George W. Bush
- Preceded by: Alexander Acosta
- Succeeded by: Peter Kirsanow

Personal details
- Born: Ronald Edward Meisburg; July 28, 1947 Bowling Green, Kentucky, U.S.
- Died: February 3, 2023 (aged 75) Washington, D.C., U.S.
- Party: Republican
- Spouse: Mary Helen Ratchford
- Education: Carson–Newman University; University of Louisville

Ronald Edward Meisburg (July 28, 1947 – February 3, 2023) was an American labor lawyer. He served as a member of the National Labor Relations Board before becoming that agency's general counsel. He later joined Hunton Andrews Kurth as special counsel in their Washington, D.C. office.
