= Donald L. Dotson =

American attorney and politician (born 1938)

Chairman of the National Labor Relations Board
- In office March 7, 1983 – December 16, 1987
- President: Ronald Reagan
- Preceded by: John C. Miller
- Succeeded by: James M. Stephens

Personal details
- Born: October 8, 1938 (age 87) Rutherford County, North Carolina, United States
- Party: Republican (from 1981)
- Other political affiliations: Democratic (until 1981)
- Education: University of North Carolina at Chapel Hill (BA); Wake Forest University (JD)
- Occupation: Attorney; politician

Military service
- Allegiance: United States
- Branch/service: United States Navy
- Years of service: 1960–1965
- Rank: Lieutenant commander

Donald L. Dotson (born October 8, 1938) is an American attorney and politician who served as the chairman of the National Labor Relations Board from 1983 to 1987. He was appointed by President Ronald Reagan and approved by the United States Senate. In addition, he also worked as counsel for several corporations and served as an assistant secretary in the Department of Labor.

Dotson was born in Rutherford County, North Carolina, and graduated from both the University of North Carolina at Chapel Hill and Wake Forest University. In the 1960s, he served in the United States Navy. Following his post-secondary education, he worked as an attorney at law for the NLRB before becoming counsel for several companies from 1973 to 1981. In 1981, President Reagan appointed him as an assistant secretary at the Department of Labor and, the following year, nominated him for the chairmanship of the NLRB.

During his tenure, Dotson was noted for taking a more pro-management and anti-union stance than previous chairmen and reversed several earlier board rulings. He also was involved in several controversies, including the accumulation of a large backlog of cases and changes to the quasi-independent position of the board's general counsel. According to news sources, both board member Patricia Diaz Dennis and Teamsters President Jackie Presser sought to have the Reagan administration oust him, though unsuccessfully. At the end of his term, he was offered a position at the law firm of Keck, Mahin & Cate.

== Early life and career ==
Donald L. Dotson was born in Rutherford County, North Carolina, on October 8, 1938. He graduated from the University of North Carolina at Chapel Hill in 1960 with a Bachelor of Arts. From 1960 to 1965, he served in the United States Navy, from which he was honorably discharged with a rank of lieutenant commander. Following this, he attended the Wake Forest University School of Law, graduating with a Juris Doctor in 1968.

Following his education, Dotson worked as an attorney at law. Beginning in 1968, Dotson served as an attorney in the National Labor Relations Board (NLRB) of the federal government of the United States. The NLRB is an independent agency that enforces federal labor laws. Among other things, the board, which consists of five members, oversees labor union representation elections and, per The New York Times, serves as a "referee" in disputes between management, workers, and unions. He worked in this position until 1973, during which time he also served as the president of the local union representing NLRB employees. From 1973 to 1975, he worked as counsel for the Westinghouse Electric Corporation and its subsidiaries on matters regarding labor. He served in the same position for several other companies, including Western Electric from 1975 to 1976 and Wheeling-Pittsburgh Steel from 1976 to 1981. By 1981, he had obtained membership in multiple bar associations, including the American Bar Association, the North Carolina Bar Association, and the Pennsylvania Bar Association.

=== Department of Labor ===
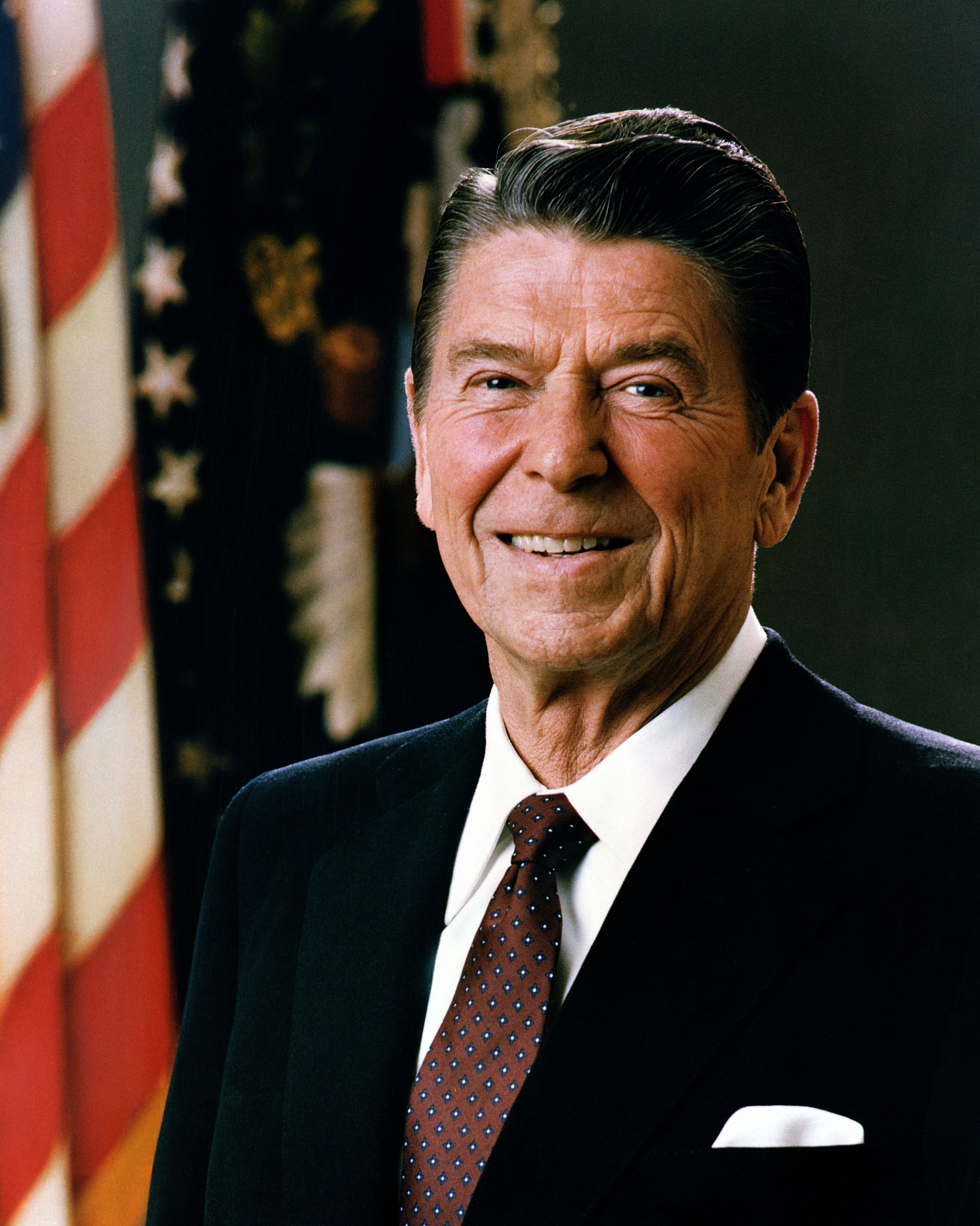
President Ronald Reagan (pictured 1981) nominated Dotson as an assistant secretary of labor in 1981.

While working for Wheeling-Pittsburgh Steel, a member of President Ronald Reagan's administration asked Dotson if he would be interested in being nominated for a position on the NLRB, which he declined. However, he later accepted an offer for nomination to a position in the Department of Labor, saying he did so because it "sounded challenging". At the time, he was a member of the Democratic Party, but he changed his political party affiliation to the Republican Party before moving to Washington, D.C. On April 17, 1981, President Ronald Reagan announced his intention to nominate Dotson as an assistant secretary of labor for labor management relations. The nomination was received by the Senate on June 2 and, on July 8, he was confirmed for the position via unanimous consent. The Senate Committee on Labor and Human Resources did not hold any formal hearings pertaining to his nomination, with journalist Pete Earley attributing this to his view as a "noncontroversial nominee".

During his time at the department, Dotson worked on enforcing the Labor Management Reporting and Disclosure Act of 1959 and the Employee Retirement Income Security Act of 1974. According to Earley, Dotson "dramatically increased" the number of unions that experienced an audit.

== NLRB chairmanship ==
=== Nomination ===
On November 22, 1982, a spokesperson for President Reagan announced that he would be nominating Dotson and attorney Patricia Diaz Dennis for memberships on the NLRB. Specifically, Dotson would be replacing John Flanning as the board's chairman. Dotson served as a replacement for John Van de Water, whose nomination had been blocked by the Labor and Human Resources Committee. Speaking later of his nomination, Dotson said that he had reluctantly accepted it after it became clear that Van de Water would not be approved by the Senate. On November 24, the AFL-CIO said it would be opposing Dotson's nomination because he was "biased in favor of management". AFL-CIO President Lane Kirkland sent a letter to the Senate wherein he expressed "grave reservations" of Dotson. The Senate received Dotson's nomination on November 29, but this nomination failed the following month. However, in January 1983, the Senate received the same nomination. On February 17, the Labor and Human Resources Committee approved his nomination via voice vote, and he was confirmed by the Senate at large via unanimous consent that same day. His term, which began on March 7, was to run until December 16, 1987. He replaced John C. Miller, a recess appointment, as the board's chairman.

=== 1983 ===
==== Changes to the general counsel's office ====
According to Earley, the NLRB became "enveloped in controversy" over the first three months of Dotson's chairmanship. On May 4, 1983, the NLRB announced that it would be instituting some changes designed to strip the board's general counsel—a quasi-independent position within the agency—of most of the powers that the position had assumed since 1955. These changes would give Dotson direct control over the firing, hiring, and promotions of the board's attorneys and place the board's solicitor in charge of appeals. At the time, Hugh L. Reilly was the board's solicitor, having previously worked under Dotson at the Department of Labor. Several members of Congress and officials from labor unions criticized this move, with Earley calling Reilly a "target of controversy" due in part to his work as a lawyer for the conservative National Right to Work Committee.

Rumors circulated because of the changes that Dotson was planning a purge of liberals from the agency. Under Dotson's chairmanship, Republican Party members controlled the board, while the general counsel, who had been appointed by President Jimmy Carter, was a member of the Democratic Party. In response, Dotson issued a memorandum denying that the moves had been political in nature. Despite this, tensions increased between the board and its attorneys, with the professional association representing the agency's attorneys filing a formal complaint against Dotson and requesting that he apologize to attorneys he had criticized as "arrogant" and "cocky".

In mid-May, Reilly was involved in a controversy after a deputy assistant secretary of labor requested his temporary return to the department for assistance on some work within his area of expertise. This request was made without the knowledge or approval of the department's secretary, Raymond J. Donovan, who blocked the move and, through a spokesperson, expressed concerns about a potential "conflict of interest" arising from Reilly's involvement with both the department and the NLRB. Dotson issued a public statement on May 19 where he dismissed news reports that Reilly's move back to the department had been at his suggestion as a way to defuse criticism of the NLRB.

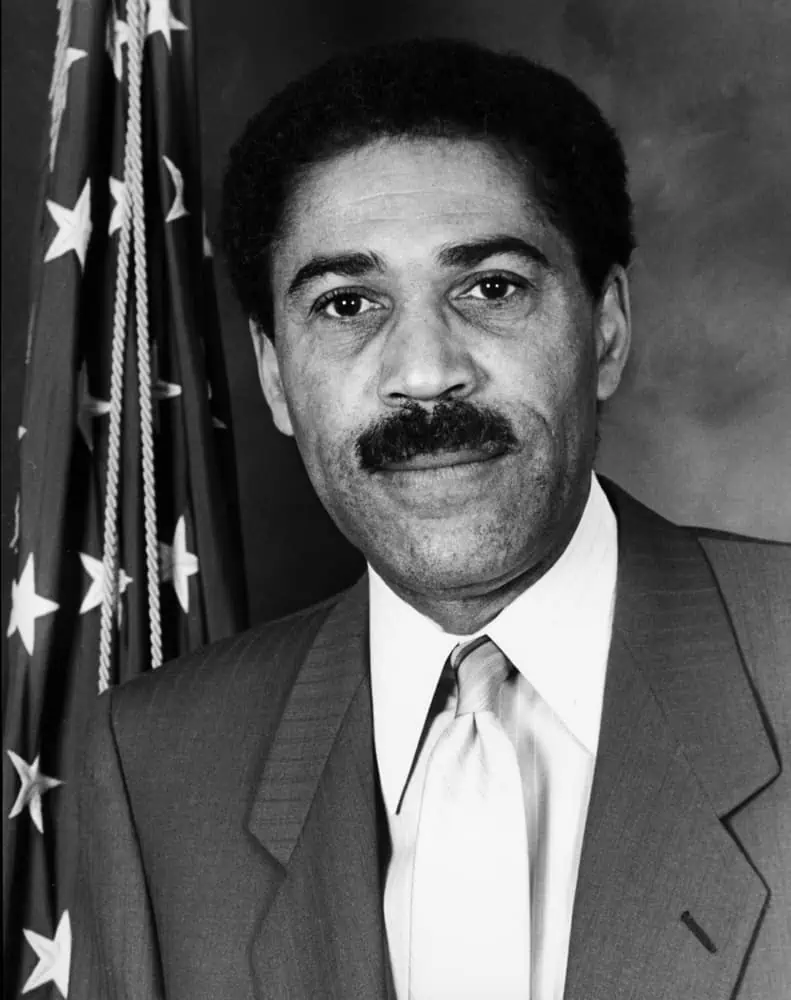
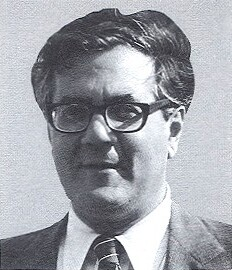
Dotson's reorganization of the general counsel's office was criticized by Representatives Bill Clay (left) and Barney Frank of the Democratic Party.

On June 15, Dotson was questioned in a congressional hearing before the House of Representatives regarding the board's reorganization of the general counsel's office. He said that the reorganization had occurred because the agency's attorneys had misrepresented the board's opinions to appellate courts and had engaged in "high-handed" and "sleazy" conduct, though fellow board member Howard Jenkins Jr. disagreed, saying that he could only recall six cases out of the last 40,000 that the NLRB had been involved with where an attorney may have misrepresented the board. Dotson received criticism from several Democratic House members, including Bill Clay and Barney Frank, but was defended by Republican Steve Bartlett. Also during the hearing, Clay and Frank discussed a situation where Dotson had allowed Reilly to serve as counsel in a case involving the Communications Workers of America that was financed by the National Right to Work Committee. Dotson defended Reilly's involvement, though he eventually withdrew from the case. Also in mid-June, 650 members of the District of Columbia Bar who practiced labor law said that Dotson's description of the general counsel's staff was "unwarranted" and "not based upon ... experience".

On June 29, another congressional hearing was held to discuss the changes to the general counsel's office, which featured testimony from Reilly. During this hearing, Reilly said that Dotson had begun discussing the reorganization plan with him around January or February, contradicting a previous statement from Dotson that he had not been the driver behind the reorganization. This was supported by statements from two of the board's other members, both Republicans—Jenkins and Robert Hunter—who said that there had been discussions on the plan about a month before its May announcement. By late June, Dotson said that he was in discussions with General Counsel William A. Lubbers about the powers he would still have following the reorganization.

==== Case backlog ====
On November 2, 1983, the United States House Oversight Subcommittee on Government Operations, headed by Representative Frank, was held to discuss the backlog of cases at the NLRB. In testimony, Dotson said that the board had a backlog of 290 union election cases and 1,291 unfair labor practice cases, representing the largest backlog in the agency's history. Also during the hearing, several union officials testified, with some saying that there had been delays of up to two years on NLRB decisions. Dotson said the delays were primarily due to the high turnover rate among board members, as between December 1979 and September 1983, the board had a full five members only fifty percent of the time and had operated with only three members for seven months. As a result, decisions became delayed due to a long-standing custom of not ruling on major decisions without a full board. At the time, the board had a vacancy following Jenkins's retirement in August, and President Reagan had yet to nominate a replacement. Journalist Drew Von Bergen quoted Representative Frank as saying that he was "convinced ... that this thing (the NLRB system) has nearly broken down". By February 1984, the backlog had grown to about 1,700 cases in total. Over the course of 1981, the board had made decisions in 880 cases, compared to an annual average of about 1,700 during the administration of President Carter. Per journalist Steven Greenhouse, some union officials alleged that the board's delays had been an intentional pro-management move, as many of the pending cases concerned charges of unfair firings.

=== 1984 ===
==== Alleged anti-union bias ====
On February 1984, The New York Times reported that Dotson's actions as NLRB chairman had been largely viewed as pro-management and anti-union. By this time, three of the board's four members had been appointed by President Reagan, including Dotson himself, and the president was planning to appoint another member to fill a vacancy. Additionally, per The New York Times, a subcommittee hearing brought up several letters Dotson had written several years earlier, with one reading, "Collective bargaining frequently means labor monopoly, the destruction of individual freedom, and the destruction of the marketplace as the mechanism for determining the value of labor." Dotson denied that he was anti-union and said that members of the press had taken his words out of context.

Throughout the first half of 1984, the NLRB made a series of rulings that reversed earlier board rulings. In January, the board had ruled that companies were legally allowed to move from union to non-union plants during the negotiation process for a collective bargaining agreement, unless specifically barred from doing so by the contract. This ruling reversed a previous board ruling and was widely applauded by pro-business interests and derided by unions. In April, they reversed a 1980 blanket rule that barred employers from interrogating employees about union organizing, instead reverting to an earlier case-by-case test regarding the legality of interrogation. That same month, they ruled that an employer could relocate their operations as part of a business restructuring plan without prior negotiations with the union. In June, the board reversed a policy upholding a 30-day waiting period on union members resigning from a union, ruling that unions had no rights to hinder a members' withdrawal. In all of these cases, the decisions had been 3-1 votes, with Dennis, Dotson, and Hunter—all appointees of President Reagan—in the majority and Donald A. Zimmerman, an appointee of President Carter, dissenting.

==== Efforts to remove from office ====
By July 1984, the NLRB consisted of Dotson as chairman alongside Dennis (a conservative Democrat), Hunter (a Republican), and Zimmerman (an independent). A fifth seat, which traditionally was reserved for an African American board member, had been vacant for the past ten months awaiting an appointment. That month, The Washington Post, citing sources in the Reagan administration, reported that NLRB member Dennis had accused Dotson of "trying to run the board as if he were its only member" and having poor relations with people who disagreed with him, especially women. Per the newspaper, Dennis had been in conflict with Dotson since the reorganization of the general counsel's office, which Dennis had been critical of. In March 1984, the two became engaged in an argument over Dotson's practice of writing letters to newspapers in the name of the NLRB, with The Washington Post saying that the confrontation also stemmed from earlier rumor that Dotson had used a racist slur and had called Dennis a "breeder" when he learned that she was pregnant. However, Dotson denied this rumor. By June 1986, the Los Angeles Times reported that Dennis and Dotson had had "bitter, often personal quarrels" with each other.

According to The Washington Post, Dennis hoped that her comments, which she had been making for several months at that point, would result in the president forcing Dotson's resignation from the NLRB. While the National Labor Relations Act of 1935 barred the removal of a board member except for malfeasance or neglect of duty, Dennis hoped that the administration could force Dotson to resign by threatening to remove him from the position of chairman.

In addition to the conflict with Dennis, the Washington Post also reported that Zimmerman had become embroiled in a dispute with Dotson regarding a request from Representative Frank for some NLRB documents. When Zimmerman said that the board should turn over the requested documents, Dotson allegedly asked him, "Who do you think you work for?", prompting a confidential memo from Zimmerman to Dotson complaining of his chairmanship style. Dotson downplayed the board's infighting and said that they had been exaggerated by his critics. Additionally, a spokesperson for Reagan said that the president had no intentions of removing Dotson as the NLRB's chairman. In response to the feuds, Dotson held a private meeting with Hunter where the latter said he would decline a chairmanship nomination if offered by the president.

On July 12, 1984, The Washington Post reported that Jackie Presser, the president of the International Brotherhood of Teamsters union, was pressing Reagan to remove Dotson as the NLRB's chairman. In mid-August, Presser told the press that his union's support of Reagan's reelection in the 1984 election would possibly be conditional on Dotson's removal. According to The Washington Post, Reagan's administration had formulated a plan to remove Dotson in exchange for the support of Presser and the Teamsters union, but opted against pursuing the plan after Presser went to the press. On August 22, Larry Speakes, a spokesperson for Reagan, said that no deal had been made on the matter at that time. Later that day, Reagan told reporters that he did not intend to oust Dotson. In response, Representative Clay said that the House Subcommittee on Labor-Management Relations would be investigating the planned removal. The following day, the Teamsters voted to support Reagan's reelection. According to The Washington Post, Presser said that he was regretful that his actions may have ultimately prevented Dotson's ouster. On September 2, the Los Angeles Times reported that Presser had acknowledged that Dotson would not be fired but expected him to receive a "demotion". In later reporting, the newspaper quoted him as saying, "I've done the opposite of what I wanted."

=== 1985–1987 ===
In May 1985, the Los Angeles Times reported that Dotson and his chief legal counsel at that time, Charles M. Williamson, had, over the preceding several months, sent numerous letters to newspapers nationwide saying that they had misrepresented or inaccurately reported on the NLRB. The following month, the AFL-CIO issued a report on the NLRB under Dotson, saying that the board had ruled against unions in 86 percent of applicable cases brought to them and that employers had won 57 percent of the cases brought to the board, compared to 16 percent from 1974 to 1976. By that time, the board had significantly reduced its backlog of cases, though delays in hearings were still common.

In June 1986, the Los Angeles Times reported that the composition of the NLRB had shifted to a more moderate conservative position than earlier in Dotson's chairmanship. This followed the appointment of several individuals to the board, including Mary Cracraft, Wilford W. Johansen, and James M. Stephens. Per journalist Harry Bernstein, the change in political position of the NLRB coincided with Dotson becoming more politically isolated from both the board and the Reagan administration as a whole. The newspaper further said that, starting in 1985, Dotson had been in the dissenting minority on dozens of cases, despite the board by this time being composed entirely of other Reagan appointees. In discussions with a member of Congress regarding the NLRB, he said the board had "only a superficial and spotty expertise in the ways of the industrial world" and "has been willing to distort some of the most fundamental legal principles to achieve results." This criticism prompted a rebuttal from Marshall B. Babson, a recently-appointed board member, who accused Dotson of "shooting himself in the foot" with his statements.

On December 6, 1987, the law firm of Keck, Mahin & Cate announced that Dotson would be joining the company upon the end of his term on the NLRB on December 16. Several news sources stated that Reagan was considering elevating either Johansen or Stephens to the role of chairman and nominating either Assistant Labor Secretary Salvatore R. Martoche or NLRB attorney John E. Higgins Jr. to fill Dotson's vacancy. According to several sources, Dotson had initially wanted to seek another term on the NLRB, but opted against this following the 1986 midterm elections, which saw significant Democratic gains in the Senate and undermined the chances of his securing confirmation. However, Dotson denied this, saying that he had intended to serve only one term when he accepted the nomination to the board. On January 7, 1988, Reagan named Stephens to head the NLRB, an appointment which did not require Senate confirmation. The following month, Reagan nominated Higgins to fill Dotson's vacancy.

== Legacy ==
Around the time of his departure from the NLRB, several news sources called Dotson one of the most controversial chairs in the NLRB's history. Harry Bernstein of the Los Angeles Times said that Dotson's tenure consisted of "years of feuding with other, less conservative board members". Several sources highlighted his anti-union stances and the reversal of several pro-labor rulings that occurred during his chairmanship.

== See also ==
- Presidency of Ronald Reagan
- Timeline of the Ronald Reagan presidency
