= Blue Man Vegas, LLC v. NLRB =

- Court: United States Court of Appeals for the District of Columbia Circuit
- Full case name: BLUE MAN VEGAS, LLC, Petitioner v. NATIONAL LABOR RELATIONS BOARD, Respondent International Alliance of Theatrical Stage Employees, Moving Picture Technicians, Artists and Allied Crafts of the United States, its Territories, Canada, Local 720, AFL-CIO, Intervenor.
- Decided: June 10, 2008
- Citation: 529 F. 3d 417 (D.C. Cir. 2008)
- Transcript: FindLaw

Case opinions
- (1) NLRB correctly applied "overwhelming community of interest" standard; (2) NLRB decision was supported by substantial evidence; and (3) NLRB decision did not create "disfavored residual unit."
- Decision by: Douglas H. Ginsburg

Blue Man Vegas, LLC v. NLRB (529 F. 3d 417 (D.C. Cir. 2008), was a case of the United States Court of Appeals for the District of Columbia Circuit, in which it held on whether the National Labor Relations Board had erred in its holding the bargaining unit proposed by the union was appropriate. The National Labor Relations Board had previously decided that Blue Man Vegas, LLC had engaged in unfair labor practices under the terms of the National Labor Relations Act through its refusing to bargain with the established union, which served as the bargaining representative.

== Background, Procedural Posture, and Arguments ==
Blue Man Vegas, LLC. served as the parent company and managing entity of the Las Vegas iteration of the Blue Man Group stage show. Apart from the eponymous blue men, which head the live show, the production was aided by professional musicians, and a stage crew, which was divided into several constituent departments. Most relevant to the case at hand are the professionals known as musical instrument technicians (MITs), who were responsible for maintaining the live instruments used by the Blue Men during the production, several of which are unique to the production itself.

From 2000 to mid-2005, Blue Man Vegas was resident and performing at the Luxor Hotel and Casino. While at the Luxor, Blue Man Vegas employed the MITs directly, with the Luxor employing members of other stage crews, with which it entered into a collective bargaining agreement with the Union. Because of these differences in employment, there were resultant differences in the terms of employment between the MITs and members of the Luxor-employed stage crews. Among these were the practice of the MITs reporting to a representative of Blue Man Vegas, while the other stage crews reported to the Luxor; the status of the MITs as salaried employees where the others were paid an hourly wage, and a separate pre-performance sheet specifically for the MITs.

In September 2005, Blue Man Vegas moved from the Luxor to a new venue at the Venetian Hotel and Casino. Following the move, Blue Man Vegas also transitioned to employing the stage crew members directly. Differences remained among the terms of employment among the MITs and stage crew employees, the most salient of which involved the payment of a salary for those MITs who had been with the company at the Luxor, while the stage crew members were still paid under an hourly wage.

In March 2006, the labor union petitioned the National Labor Relations Board for its overseeing a representation election regarding the installation of a union composed of all of the stage crew employees with the exception of the MITs. Blue Man Vegas objected to this configuration, arguing that the MITs should also be included in the bargaining unit. In response to these respective arguments, the National Labor Relations Board's regional director, pursuant to §9(b) of the National Labor Relations Act, that the unit as proposed by the Union was appropriate and compelled the representation election. The Board denied a subsequent motion by Blue Man Vegas for review of the Regional Director's decision.

The Union won the resulting representation election, with the regional director certifying the Union as the exclusive bargaining representative. In the month following the election, the Labor Board's regional director issued a complaint against Blue Man Vegas which alleged that the company had refused to bargain with the Union, breaching the duty to bargain in good faith in violation of §§8(a)(1) and 5 of the National Labor Relations Act. Blue Man Vegas conversely argued that it was not required to bargain with the union as the exclusion of the MITs within the unit made the union inappropriate. The Board issued summary judgment for the General Counsel, finding that Blue Man Vegas had or could have raised all representation issues prior to the union determination and certification by the Board and that Blue Man Vegas did not submit evidence previously unavailable to the involved parties. Blue Man Vegas petitioned the D.C. Circuit Court for review, with the National Labor Relations Board cross-appealing for enforcement of its prior decision.

== Analysis and Holding ==
Blue Man Vegas submitted three arguments for the court's analysis: (1) The Board applied the wrong standard to determine whether the proposed unit was appropriate; (2) the unit determination was not supported by substantial evidence; and (3) the exclusion of the MITs from the proposed unit created a "disfavored residual unit."

Ginsburg writes in his opinion for the court that the Labor Board is primarily concerned with whether the employees within a proposed bargaining unit are members of a subjective "community of interest", and thus bargaining unit determinations should be made on a case-by-case basis, using the provisions of the National Labor Relations Act as a guide. With respect to this standard, the decisions of the National Labor Relations Board generally rely on a loose prima facie standard of appropriateness. The employer has a resultant and corresponding burden to show that said bargaining unit is "truly inappropriate," which may mean, for example, that there exists no legitimate reasoning for excluding certain individual or a class of employees from it. That is, if the excluded employees share a reasonable community of interest with included employees, there exists no legitimate reason for excluding them from the bargaining unit.

Blue Man Vegas asserted that the Labor Board applied an incorrect standard in making its unit determination, effectively "accord[ing] controlling weight to the Union's extent of organization", which would violate §9(c)(5) of the National Labor Relations Act. Relying on the aforementioned Community of Interest standard, and on a prior Board decision in Lundy Packing Co. (Lundy I), 314 N.L.R.B. 1042, 1043-44 (1994), Blue Man Vegas suggested that the Community of Interest Standard itself "unlawfully gives controlling weight to the union's extent of organization."
