= James A. Gross =

American educator and historian (born 1933)

- Born: 1933 (age 92–93)
- Education: BS, La Salle University; MA, Temple University; Ph.D., University of Wisconsin-Madison
- Occupation: Professor
- Years active: 1960–present

James A. Gross (born 1933) is an American educator and historian who teaches United States labor law and labor history at the Cornell University School of Industrial and Labor Relations. He is the author of a highly regarded three-volume history of the National Labor Relations Board (NLRB) and is considered the leading historian of the NLRB.

== Career ==
James Gross was born in 1933 and raised near Philadelphia, Pennsylvania. He played baseball as a youth, and for many years pursued a career as a major league ball player. He graduated from La Salle University with a Bachelor of Science in 1956.

He entered the United States Army after college. But after only a short time on active duty he left the military and enrolled at Temple University, where he received a Master of Arts in 1957. Although he still wanted to play professional baseball, at the urging of friends he enrolled in the graduate doctoral program at the University of Wisconsin-Madison. Dissatisfied with the degree program, he decided to leave and take a job with the Continental Can Company in New York City. But the university offered him a teaching assistant position, and he stayed in school. Although he almost left again, he was asked to teach a class (which gave him more money to live on) and discovered that he very much enjoyed teaching. Gross received his Ph.D. from the University of Wisconsin in 1962.

Gross taught as an assistant professor at Holy Cross College from 1960 to 1966 before joining the faculty at Cornell. He was named an associate professor in 1968 and a full professor in 1975.

His three-volume history of the National Labor Relations Board has been called "authoritative" and "exhaustive". The second volume in the trilogy, The Reshaping of the National Labor Relations Board: National Labor Policy in Transition, 1937-1947, won the prestigious Philip Taft Labor History Book Award in 1983.

== Memberships and awards ==
Gross is a member of the National Academy of Arbitrators, the American Arbitration Association, and the Federal Mediation and Conciliation Service. He has also worked as a labor relations mediator for the National Hockey League and Major League Baseball.

Gross is the recipient of a grant from the National Endowment for the Humanities, and in 2007 was Fulbright Visiting Research Chair in Corporate Social Responsibility at McGill University in Canada.

== Bibliography ==
- Colosi, Thomas R. Proceedings of Two Seminars Sponsored by Federal Mediation and Conciliation Service. Jamestown, N.Y.: Jamestown Community College Press, 1968.
- Compa, Lance. "Trade Unions and Human Rights." In Bringing Human Rights Home. Cynthia Soohoo, Catherine Albisa, and Martha F. Davis, eds., Westport, Conn.: Praeger, 2008.
- "Faculty Profile: James Gross." ILR Connections. Winter 2002. Accessed 2010-11-17.
- Gross, James A. Rights, Not Interests: Resolving Value Clashes Under the National Labor Relations Act. Ithaca, N.Y.: ILR Press, 2017.
- Gross, James A. Broken Promise: The Subversion of American Labor Relations Policy, 1947-1994. Philadelphia, Pa.: Temple University Press, 1996.
- Gross, James A., ed. Workers' Rights As Human Rights. Albany, N.Y.: ILR Press, 2006.
- Hodges, James A. "The Real Norma Rae." In Southern Labor in Transition, 1940-1995. Robert H. Zieger, ed. Knoxville, Tenn.: University of Tennessee Press, 1997.
- Hornby, Lance. "WHA-t Is Event's Status?" Toronto Sun. April 26, 2005.
- Johnson, Christopher H. Maurice Sugar: Law, Labor, and the Left in Detroit, 1912-1950. Detroit: Wayne State University Press, 1988.
- Law, Gordon T., ed. A Guide to Sources of Information on the National Labor Relations Board. Florence, Ky.: Routledge, 2002.
- Miller, J. Gormly; McGinnis, Boodie N.; and Julian, Robert R. "Appendix A : Time Line, Events, Incidents, and Items of Note." In The ILR School at Fifty: Voices of the Faculty, Alumni & Friends. Paper 14. 1996. Accessed 2010-11-17.
