= John H. Fanning =

American lawyer

John Harold Fanning
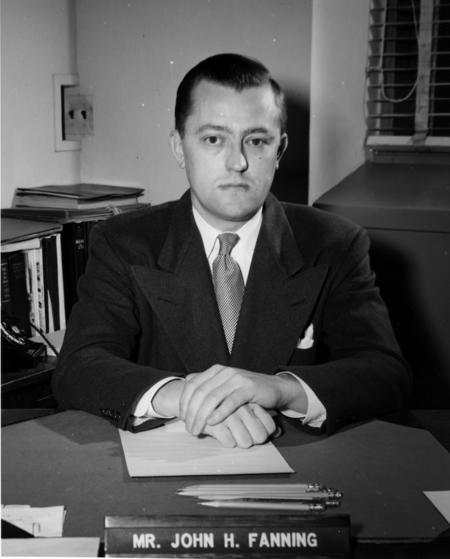
- John H. Fanning in 1950
- Born: September 19, 1916; Putnam, Connecticut, U.S.
- Died: July 21, 1990 (aged 73); Washington, D.C., U.S.
- Occupations: Attorney; federal government employee

John Harold Fanning (September 19, 1916 — July 21, 1990) was an American lawyer and member of the National Labor Relations Board for a record 25 years (from 1957 to 1982). He was the Board's Chair from 1977 to 1981.

== Early life ==
John Harold Fanning was born in Putnam, Connecticut, and graduated from Norwich Free Academy. During his summer vacations, he worked in a textile mill. He earned a bachelor's degree from Providence College in 1938, and a law degree from the Columbus School of Law at Catholic University of America in 1941.

== Career ==
Fanning joined the United States Department of Labor in 1942 as a staff attorney. In 1943, he joined the Department of War, where he served as Chief of the Domestic Labor Standards Section of the Industrial Personnel Division of the Army Service Forces. He was appointed Chief of the Industrial Relations Branch of the Office of the Judge Advocate General of the Army in 1945. He was named special assistant to the Judge Advocate General of the Army for procurement in 1948; Director of the Office of Industrial Relations at the Department of Defense (DOD) in 1951; and Director of the DOD Office of Domestic Programs in 1955.

On December 20, 1957, President Dwight Eisenhower appointed Fanning as a Member of the National Labor Relations Board (NLRB). At the time he joined the NLRB, the Board and its regional directors were handling about 16,000 cases a year. In a testament to his professionalism and bipartisanship, he was reappointed by Presidents Eisenhower, John F. Kennedy, Lyndon B. Johnson, Richard Nixon, and Jimmy Carter. He was widely known for being exceptionally knowledgeable about Board rulings, but was also a frequent dissenter on the Board and known for being favorable to labor unions. Fanning did not deny this bias, noting in 1977, "I'm convinced that if a company has a union in its plant, the union was pretty much invited in by the actions of the company. People don't pay union dues if they are entirely happy. Many employers are now recognizing that if you are not greedy, you can keep a union out of your plant if you really want to. All you have to do is pay the prevailing wages or a little more." His reappointment to the NLRB by President Nixon in 1972 for a fourth five-year term set a record at the time.

Fanning was appointed Chair of the NLRB by President Jimmy Carter in April 1977. At the time he was sworn in, he had participated in more than 20,000 decisions. The Board's workload, however, had dropped to about just 1,000 cases a year. Under Fanning's leadership, the NLRB adopted a "vote and impound" procedure so that union organizing elections could be held as scheduled despite objections raised by unions or employers (a procedure which significantly sped up the election process). He supported proposed labor law reforms in 1977, but did not think they would matter much in terms of union organizing. "Nothing that the Board does and nothing that is in the law starts or stops a tide of unionization in a particular industry. Organizing always seems to have a momentum of its own." He also instituted administrative reforms within the agency, establishing regional offices for the Board's extensive administrative law judge division rather than keeping them in Washington, D.C.

William A. Lubbers served as Deputy Chief Counsel to the NLRB under Fanning. When Lubbers was nominated in late 1979 to be the General Counsel, his nomination was filibustered by Republican Senators who felt that he was too close to the pro-labor Fanning.

Fanning stepped down as NLRB Chairman on August 14, 1981. He retired from the NLRB on December 16, 1982. During his 25 years with the labor board, he took part in more than 25,000 decisions.

== Retirement and death ==
After his retirement from the NLRB, Fanning lived in Bethesda, Maryland. He joined the Providence, Rhode Island, law firm of Hinckley, Allen, Snyder & Comen, and worked part-time as counsel to the International Brotherhood of Electrical Workers. He also was appointed a member of the Foreign Service Labor Relations Board. The year he retired, however, his wife of 40 years, Eloise Cooney Fanning, died.

Fanning established the John H. Fanning Chair in Labor Relations at the CUA Columbus School of Law, the John H. Fanning Conference on Labor-Management Relations at Providence College, and the John H. and Eloise M. Fanning Memorial Scholarship at Providence College.

John H. Fanning died from kidney failure at Georgetown University Hospital on July 21, 1990. His daughters Mary Ellen Dunn, Ann Gallagher, and Gaele DeGross and his sons John Michael Fanning and Stephen Thomas Fanning survived him.
