= Edward B. Miller =

American political consultant

Edward B. Miller (born August 22, 1971, Baltimore, Maryland), served as Deputy Chief of Staff to former Republican Governor Robert Ehrlich.

== Biography ==
Miller received a B.A. in history from the University of Pennsylvania in 1993, and a J.D. from the University of Virginia School of Law in 2000. He worked as a political pollster in Washington, D.C., later becoming an attorney with the Baltimore firm Piper Rudnik LLP.

In August 2003, Miller joined the Maryland state government as Chief of Staff in the Department of Business and Economic Development, serving until November of the same year. He then became Deputy Secretary of the department, a position he held until January 2004.

On January 16, 2004, Miller was appointed as Ehrlich's Deputy Chief of Staff, overseeing multiple departments and agencies including Agriculture; Business and Economic Development; Environment; General Services; Housing and Community Development; Labor, Licensing, and Regulation; Natural Resources; Planning; Transportation; Office of Minority Affairs; State Department of Assessments and Taxation; Maryland Automobile Insurance Fund; Maryland Economic Development Corporation; Maryland Energy Administration; Maryland Environmental Service; Maryland Insurance Administration; State Lottery Agency; and Maryland Stadium Authority.
