= Political appointments of the first Trump administration =

This is a list of political appointments of current officeholders made by the 45th president of the United States, Donald Trump.

Links to lists of announced positions from which candidates have withdrawn or appointees who have resigned or have been terminated, as well as lists of appointments to other independent agencies and of holdovers from previous administrations are below.

Following President Trump's election, there were around 4,000 political appointment positions which the incoming Trump administration needed to review, and fill or confirm, of which 1,212 required Senate confirmation. The Washington Post has identified 757 key positions requiring U.S. Senate confirmation. As of September 8, 2020, 531 of Trump's nominees for key positions had been confirmed, 97 were awaiting confirmation, and 13 had been announced but not yet formally nominated, a total of 639 positions. Trump has said he intends not to fill many of the positions. The rules of the Senate require that when the term of the Senate expires (in the case of the 115th Congress, at noon on January 3, 2019), nominations then pending lapse and are returned to the president, who can resubmit them to the new Congress.

All members of the Cabinet require confirmation by the United States Senate following nomination by the president prior to taking office. The vice presidency is exceptional in that the position requires election to office pursuant to the United States Constitution. Although some positions are of Cabinet-level rank, non-cabinet members within the Executive Office of the President, such as White House chief of staff, national security advisor, and White House press secretary, do not hold constitutionally created positions and most do not require Senate confirmation for appointment. Persons appointed on an acting basis do not require Senate confirmation before they begin to act in their position, even if a permanent appointment to that position would require confirmation. Appointments to judgeships on federal courts and of ambassadors require nomination by the president and confirmation by the Senate. Acting appointments to these positions are not permissible.

== Analysis ==
Certain news organizations, such as Politico and Newsweek, called Trump's incomplete cabinet a "conservative dream team" or "the most conservative cabinet [in United States history]". On the other hand, The Wall Street Journal stated that "it's nearly impossible to identify a clear ideological bent in the incoming president's" cabinet nominations. The Wall Street Journal also stated that Trump's nominations signaled a pro-deregulation administration policy.

Among Donald Trump's appointments there were several former Goldman Sachs employees, such as Steven Mnuchin, Steven Bannon, and Gary Cohn, as well as several generals, including Michael T. Flynn, James Mattis, and John F. Kelly. These appointments generated criticism, including alleged violations of the principle of civilian control of the military and allegations of regulatory capture. Democratic senator from Missouri, Claire McCaskill, criticized Donald Trump's cabinet stating; "I call it the three 'G' Cabinet: Goldman, generals and gazillionaires."

On January 18, 2017, two days before Trump's inauguration, it was reported that Trump had by then nominated only 28 people to fill 690 positions requiring Senate confirmation. In particular, there had been no nominations below the Cabinet level for the departments of State or Defense, and the staff for the National Security Council was incomplete, while none of the NSC leadership had any NSC experience.

On February 28, 2017, Trump announced he did not intend on filling many of the numerous governmental positions that were still vacant, as he considered them unnecessary. According to CNN on February 25, there were nearly 2,000 vacant government positions.

== Color key ==
Denotes appointees serving in offices that did not require Senate confirmation.
Denotes appointees confirmed by the Senate.
Denotes appointees awaiting Senate confirmation.
Denotes appointees serving in an acting capacity.
Denotes appointees who have left office or offices which have been disbanded.
Denotes nominees who were withdrawn prior to being confirmed or assuming office.

== Department of Agriculture ==
Office	Nominee	Assumed office	Left office
Secretary of Agriculture	Sonny Perdue	April 25, 2017 (Confirmed April 24, 2017, 87–11)	January 20, 2021
Deputy Secretary of Agriculture	Stephen Censky	October 11, 2017 (Confirmed October 3, 2017, voice vote)	November 8, 2020

== Department of Commerce ==
Office	Nominee	Assumed office	Left office
Secretary of Commerce	Wilbur Ross	February 28, 2017 (Confirmed February 27, 2017, 72–27)	January 20, 2021
Deputy Secretary of Commerce	Karen Dunn Kelley	November 29, 2017	November 29, 2018
Deputy Secretary of Commerce	Karen Dunn Kelley	November 29, 2018 (Confirmed November 28, 2018, 62–38)	January 20, 2021

== Department of Defense ==
Office	Nominee	Assumed office	Left office
Secretary of Defense	Chris Miller	November 9, 2020	January 20, 2021
Deputy Secretary of Defense	David Norquist	January 2, 2019	July 23, 2019
Deputy Secretary of Defense	David Norquist	July 31, 2019 (Confirmed July 30, 2019, voice vote)	February 8, 2021

== Department of Education ==
Office	Nominee	Assumed office	Left office
Secretary of Education	Betsy DeVos	February 7, 2017 (Confirmed February 7, 2017, 51*–50); *Vice President Pence provided the tie-breaking vote.	January 8, 2021
Deputy Secretary of Education	Mick Zais	May 17, 2018 (Confirmed May 16, 2018, 50–48)	

== Department of Energy ==
Office	Nominee	Assumed office	Left office
Secretary of Energy	Dan Brouillette	December 4, 2019 (Confirmed December 2, 2019, 70–15)	
Deputy Secretary of Energy	Mark Menezes	December 4, 2019	August 4, 2020
Deputy Secretary of Energy	Mark Menezes	August 4, 2020 (Confirmed August 4, 2020, 79–16)	
Under Secretary of Energy (Management and Performance)	Mark Menezes	November 6, 2017 (Confirmed November 2, 2017, voice vote)	August 4, 2020

== Department of Health and Human Services ==
Office	Nominee	Assumed office	Left office
Secretary of Health and Human Services	Alex Azar	January 29, 2018 (Confirmed January 24, 2018, 55–43)	
Secretary of Health and Human Services	Eric Hargan	October 10, 2017	January 29, 2018
Deputy Secretary of Health and Human Services	Eric Hargan	October 6, 2017 (Confirmed October 4, 2017, 57–38)	

== Department of Homeland Security ==
Office	Nominee	Assumed office	Left office
Secretary of Homeland Security	Chad Wolf	November 13, 2019	January 11, 2021
Deputy Secretary of Homeland Security	Ken Cuccinelli	November 13, 2019	

== Department of Housing and Urban Development ==
Office	Nominee	Assumed office	Left office
Secretary of Housing and Urban Development	Ben Carson	March 2, 2017 (Confirmed March 2, 2017, 58–41)	
Deputy Secretary of Housing and Urban Development	Brian D. Montgomery	May 12, 2020 (Confirmed May 12, 2020, 61–32)	
Deputy Secretary of Housing and Urban Development	Brian D. Montgomery	January 17, 2019	

== Department of the Interior ==
Office	Nominee	Assumed office	Left office
Secretary of the Interior	David Bernhardt	January 2, 2019	April 11, 2019
Secretary of the Interior	David Bernhardt	April 11, 2019	
Deputy Secretary of the Interior	Katharine MacGregor	September 30, 2019	February 25, 2020
Deputy Secretary of the Interior	Katharine MacGregor	February 25, 2020 (Confirmed February 25, 2020, 58-38)	

== Department of Justice ==
Office	Nominee	Assumed office	left office
Attorney General	William Barr	February 14, 2019 (Confirmed February 14, 2019, 54–45)	December 23, 2020
Deputy Attorney General	Jeffrey A. Rosen	May 22, 2019 (Confirmed May 16, 2019, 52–45)	

== Department of Labor ==
Office	Nominee	Assumed office	Left office
Secretary of Labor	Eugene Scalia	September 30, 2019 (Confirmed September 26, 2019, 53–44)	
Secretary of Labor	Patrick Pizzella	July 20, 2019	September 30, 2019
Deputy Secretary of Labor	Patrick Pizzella	April 17, 2018 (Confirmed April 12, 2018, 50–48)	

== Department of State ==
Office	Nominee	Assumed office	Left office
Secretary of State	Mike Pompeo	April 26, 2018 (Confirmed April 26, 2018, 57–42)	
Deputy Secretary of State	Stephen Biegun	December 21, 2019 (Confirmed December 19, 2019, 90–3)	
Deputy Secretary of State (Management and Resources)	Stephen Biegun	December 21, 2019 (Confirmed December 19, 2019, 90–3)	

== Department of Transportation ==
Office	Nominee	Assumed office	Left office
Secretary of Transportation	Elaine Chao	January 31, 2017 (Confirmed January 31, 2017, 93–6)	January 11, 2021
Deputy Secretary of Transportation	Steven G. Bradbury	September 10, 2019	
General Counsel of Transportation	Steven G. Bradbury	November 28, 2017 (Confirmed November 14, 2017, 50–47)	

== Department of the Treasury ==
Office	Nominee	Assumed office	Left office
Secretary of the Treasury	Steven Mnuchin	February 13, 2017 (Confirmed February 13, 2017, 53–47)	
Deputy Secretary of the Treasury	Justin Muzinich	December 12, 2018 (Confirmed December 11, 2018, 55–44)	

== Department of Veterans Affairs ==
Office	Nominee	Assumed office	Left office
Secretary of Veterans Affairs	Robert Wilkie	March 28, 2018	May 29, 2018
Secretary of Veterans Affairs	Robert Wilkie	July 30, 2018 (Confirmed July 23, 2018, 86–9)	
Deputy Secretary of Veterans Affairs	Pamela J. Powers	April 2, 2020	
General Counsel of Veterans Affairs	Vacant		
Chief Financial Officer of Veterans Affairs	Jon J. Rychalski	February 7, 2018 (Confirmed December 21, 2017, voice vote)	
Under Secretary of Veterans Affairs (Benefits)	Paul Lawrence	May 15, 2018 (Confirmed April 26, 2018, voice vote)	
Under Secretary of Veterans Affairs for Health	Vacant		
Under Secretary of Veterans Affairs (Memorial Affairs)	Randy Reeves	December 12, 2017 (Confirmed November 8, 2017, voice vote)	
Assistant Secretary of Veterans Affairs (Legislative Affairs)	Brooks Tucker	August 10, 2017 (Confirmed August 3, 2017, voice vote)	
Assistant Secretary of Veterans Affairs (Information and Technology)	James Gfrerer	January 7, 2019 (Confirmed January 2, 2019, voice vote)	
Assistant Secretary of Veterans Affairs (Enterprise Integration)	Melissa Sue Glynn	January 2, 2018 (Confirmed November 8, 2017, voice vote)	
Assistant Secretary of Veterans Affairs (Accountability and Whistleblower Protection)	Tamara Bonzanto	January 7, 2019 (Confirmed January 2, 2019, voice vote)	
Chairman of the Board of the Board of Veterans' Appeals	Cheryl L. Mason	December 11, 2017 (Confirmed November 8, 2017, voice vote)	
Creating Options for Veterans' Expedited Recovery Commission
Chairman of the Creating Options for Veterans' Expedited Recovery Commission	Jake Leinenkugel	June 2018	
Member of the Creating Options for Veterans' Expedited Recovery Commission	Thomas E. Beeman	June 2018	

== Independent intelligence agencies ==
=== Office of the Director of National Intelligence ===
Office	Nominee	Assumed office	Left office
Office of the Director of National Intelligence
Director of National Intelligence	John Ratcliffe	May 26, 2020 (Confirmed May 21, 2020, 49–44)	
Chief Information Officer	John Sherman	September 5, 2017 (Announced August 18, 2017)	
National Counterintelligence Executive
Director of the National Counterintelligence and Security Center	William Evanina	June 2, 2014	
Director of the National Counterintelligence and Security Center	William Evanina	May 6, 2020 (Confirmed May 6, 2020, 84–7)	
National Counterterrorism Center
Director of the National Counterterrorism Center	Christopher C. Miller	August 10, 2020 (Confirmed August 6, 2020, voice vote)	November 9, 2020

=== Central Intelligence Agency ===
Office	Nominee	Assumed office	Left office
Director of the Central Intelligence Agency	Gina Haspel	April 26, 2018	May 21, 2018
Director of the Central Intelligence Agency	Gina Haspel	May 21, 2018 (Confirmed May 17, 2018, 54–45)	
Deputy Director of the Central Intelligence Agency	Vaughn Bishop	August 1, 2018 (Appointed by the President)	
General Counsel of the Central Intelligence Agency	Courtney Simmons Elwood	June 6, 2017 (Confirmed June 6, 2017, 66–33)	

== Other independent agencies ==
=== Environmental Protection Agency ===
Office	Nominee	Assumed office	Left office
Administrator of the Environmental Protection Agency	Andrew R. Wheeler	July 9, 2018 (Announced on July 5, 2018)	February 28, 2019
Administrator of the Environmental Protection Agency	Andrew R. Wheeler	February 28, 2019 (Confirmed February 28, 2019, 52–47)	
Deputy Administrator of the Environmental Protection Agency	Vacant		
Chief Financial Officer of the Environmental Protection Agency	Holly Greaves	March 15, 2018 (Confirmed February 15, 2018, voice vote)	
General Counsel of the Environmental Protection Agency	Matthew Leopold	January 9, 2018 (Confirmed December 14, 2017, voice vote)	October 5, 2020
Inspector General of the Environmental Protection Agency	Sean O'Donnell	January 27, 2020 (Confirmed December 19, 2019, voice vote)	
Assistant Administrator of the Environmental Protection Agency (Toxic Substances)	Alexandra Dunn	January 3, 2019 (Confirmed January 2, 2019, voice vote)	
Assistant Administrator of the Environmental Protection Agency (Enforcement and Compliance Assurance)	Susan Bodine	January 5, 2018 (Confirmed July 12, 2017, voice vote)	
Assistant Administrator of the Environmental Protection Agency (International and Tribal Affairs)	Chad McIntosh	TBD (Confirmed January 3, 2019, voice vote)	
Assistant Administrator of the Environmental Protection Agency (Land and Emergency Management)	Peter C. Wright	TBD (Confirmed July 11, 2019 52–38)	
Assistant Administrator of the Environmental Protection Agency (Office of Water)	David Ross	January 22, 2018 (Confirmed December 14, 2017, voice vote)	

=== Small Business Administration ===
Office	Nominee	Assumed office	Left office
Administrator of the Small Business Administration	Jovita Carranza	January 14, 2020 (Confirmed January 7, 2020, 88–5)	
Chief Counsel of Advocacy for the Small Business Administration	Vacant		
Inspector General of the Small Business Administration	Hannibal Ware	May 24, 2018 (Confirmed April 26, 2018, voice vote)	

=== Federal Reserve System ===
Office	Nominee	Assumed office	Left office
Chairman of the Federal Reserve	Jerome Powell	February 5, 2018 (Confirmed January 23, 2018, 84–13)	
Vice Chairman of the Federal Reserve	Richard Clarida	September 17, 2018 (Confirmed August 28, 2018, 69–26)	
Vice Chairman for Supervision of the Federal Reserve	Randal Quarles	October 13, 2017 (Confirmed October 5, 2017, 65–32)	
Member of the Board of Governors of the Federal Reserve System	Christopher Waller	December 18, 2020 (confirmed December 3, 2020, 48-47)	
Member of the Board of Governors of the Federal Reserve System	Michelle Bowman	November 26, 2018 (Confirmed November 15, 2018, 64–34)	
Member of the Board of Governors of the Federal Reserve System	Michelle Bowman	TBD (reappointment) (confirmed September 12, 2019, 60–31)	
Member of the Board of Governors of the Federal Reserve System	Randal Quarles	July 18, 2018 (Confirmed July 17, 2018, 66–33)	
Member of the Board of Governors of the Federal Reserve System	Richard Clarida	September 17, 2018 (Confirmed August 28, 2018, voice vote)	
Member of the Board of Governors of the Federal Reserve System	Vacant		

=== NASA ===
Office	Nominee	Assumed office	Left office
Administrator of the National Aeronautics and Space Administration	James Bridenstine	April 23, 2018 (Confirmed April 19, 2018, 50–49)	
Deputy Administrator of the National Aeronautics and Space Administration	James Morhard	October 17, 2018 (Confirmed October 11, 2018, voice vote)	
Executive Secretary of the National Space Council	Scott Pace	July 13, 2017 (without Senate confirmation)	
Chief Financial Officer of the National Aeronautics and Space Administration	Jeff DeWit	April 3, 2018 (Confirmed March 14, 2018, voice vote)	February 14, 2020

=== Independent banks ===
Office	Nominee	Assumed office	Left office
Export–Import Bank of the United States
President of the Export–Import Bank of the United States	Kimberly A. Reed	May 9, 2019 (Confirmed May 8, 2019, 79–17)	
Member of the Board of Directors of the Export–Import Bank of the United States	Spencer Bachus	May 9, 2019 (Confirmed May 8, 2019, 72–22)	
Member of the Board of Directors of the Export–Import Bank of the United States	Vacant		
Member of the Board of Directors of the Export–Import Bank of the United States	Judith Pryor	May 10, 2019 (Confirmed May 8, 2019, 77–19)	
Inspector General of the Export-Import Bank of the United States	Vacant		
International Bank for Reconstruction and Development
Governor of the International Bank for Reconstruction and Development	Steven Mnuchin	April 2018 (Confirmed March 22, 2018, voice vote)	
Alternate Governor of the International Bank for Reconstruction and Development	Keith J. Krach	June 21, 2019 (Confirmed June 20, 2019, voice vote)	
United States Executive Director of the International Bank for Reconstruction and Development	Jennifer Nordquist	September 2019 (Confirmed September 12, 2019, voice vote)	
United States Alternate Executive Director of the International Bank for Reconstruction and Development	Erik Bethel	April 2018 (Confirmed March 22, 2018, voice vote)	
European Bank for Reconstruction and Development
Governor of the European Bank for Reconstruction and Development	Steven Mnuchin	April 16, 2018 (Confirmed March 22, 2018, voice vote)	
Alternate Governor of the European Bank for Reconstruction and Development	Keith J. Krach	TBD (Confirmed June 20, 2019, voice vote)	
United States Director of the European Bank for Reconstruction and Development	Judy Shelton	April 16, 2018 (Confirmed March 22, 2018, voice vote)	
United States Director of the European Bank for Reconstruction and Development	J. Steven Dowd	September 2020 (Confirmed August 6, 2020, voice vote)	
African Development Bank
Governor of the African Development Fund	Steven Mnuchin	April 2018 (Confirmed March 22, 2018, voice vote)	
United States Director of the African Development Bank	J. Steven Dowd	October 2018 (Confirmed October 5, 2017, voice vote)	
Asian Development Bank
Governor of the Asian Development Bank	Steven Mnuchin	April 2018 (Confirmed March 22, 2018, voice vote)	
United States Director of the Asian Development Bank	Jason Myung-Ik Chung	TBD (Confirmed August 6, 2020, voice vote)	
Inter-American Development Bank
Governor of the Inter-American Development Bank	Steven Mnuchin	April 2018 (Confirmed March 22, 2018, voice vote)	
Alternate Governor of the Inter-American Development Bank	Keith J. Krach	TBD (Confirmed June 20, 2019, voice vote)	
United States Executive Director of the Inter-American Development Bank	Eliot Pedrosa	TBD (Confirmed August 1, 2019, voice vote)	
United States Alternate Executive Director of the Inter-American Development Bank	Eliot Pedrosa	June 2018 (Confirmed May 24, 2018, voice vote)	
United States Alternate Executive Director of the Inter-American Development Bank	Vacant		

=== Independent boards ===
Office	Nominee	Assumed office	Left office
Amtrak Board
Member of the Amtrak Board of Directors	Lynn Westmoreland	Upon Senate confirmation	
Member of the Amtrak Board of Directors	Joe Gruters	Upon Senate confirmation	
Member of the Amtrak Board of Directors	Rick Dearborn	Upon Senate confirmation	
Member of the Amtrak Board of Directors	Theodore Rokita	Upon Senate confirmation	
Chemical Safety and Hazard Investigation Board
Chairperson of the Chemical Safety and Hazard Investigation Board	Katherine Lemos	April 23, 2020 (Confirmed March 23, 2020, voice vote)	
Member of the Chemical Safety and Hazard Investigation Board	Katherine Lemos	April 23, 2020 (Confirmed March 23, 2020, voice vote)	
Defense Nuclear Facilities Safety Board
Member of the Defense Nuclear Facilities Safety Board	Joseph Bruce Hamilton	TBD (Confirmed July 2, 2020, voice vote)	
Member of the Defense Nuclear Facilities Safety Board	Joyce Louise Connery	TBD (Confirmed July 2, 2020, voice vote)	
Member of the Defense Nuclear Facilities Safety Board	Jessie Hill Roberson	TBD (Confirmed July 2, 2020, voice vote)	
Member of the Defense Nuclear Facilities Safety Board	Thomas A. Summers	TBD (Confirmed July 2, 2020, voice vote)	
Merit Systems Protection Board
Chair of the Merit Systems Protection Board	Dennis Dean Kirk	Upon Senate confirmation	
Member of the Merit Systems Protection Board	B. Chad Bungard	Upon Senate confirmation	
Member of the Merit Systems Protection Board	Julia Akins Clark	Upon Senate confirmation	
National Labor Relations Board
Chairman of the National Labor Relations Board	John F. Ring	April 16, 2018 (Confirmed April 11, 2018, 50–48)	
Chairman of the National Labor Relations Board	Marvin Kaplan	December 21, 2017 (Designated by the President)	April 16, 2018
Member of the National Labor Relations Board	Marvin Kaplan	August 10, 2017 (Confirmed August 2, 2017, 50–48) (Confirmed July 29, 2020, 52–46)	
Member of the National Labor Relations Board	William Emanuel	September 28, 2017 (Confirmed September 25, 2017, 49–47)	
Member of the National Labor Relations Board	Lauren McFerran	July 29, 2020 (Confirmed July 29, 2020, 53–42)	
General Counsel of the National Labor Relations Board	Peter B. Robb	November 17, 2017 (Confirmed November 8, 2017, 49–46)	
National Mediation Board
Member of the National Mediation Board	Gerald Fauth	November 9, 2017 (Confirmed November 2, 2017, voice vote)	
Member of the National Mediation Board	Kyle Fortson	November 13, 2017 (Confirmed November 2, 2017, voice vote)	
Member of the National Mediation Board	Linda Puchala	November 2, 2017 (Confirmed November 2, 2017, voice vote) (Reappointed)	
National Transportation Safety Board
Chairman of the National Transportation Safety Board	Robert L. Sumwalt	August 10, 2017 (Confirmed August 3, 2017, voice vote) (Fourth Term)	
Chairman of the National Transportation Safety Board	Robert L. Sumwalt	TBD (Confirmed August 1, 2019, voice vote) (Fifth Term)	
Member of the National Transportation Safety Board	Bruce Landsberg	August 7, 2018 (Confirmed July 24, 2018, voice vote)	
Member of the National Transportation Safety Board	Jennifer Homendy	August 20, 2018 (Confirmed July 24, 2018, voice vote)	
Member of the National Transportation Safety Board	Jennifer Homendy	TBD (Confirmed August 1, 2019, voice vote) (Reappointment)	
Member of the National Transportation Safety Board	Michael Graham	January 3, 2020 (Confirmed December 19, 2019, voice vote)	
Member of the National Transportation Safety Board	Thomas B. Chapman	January 6, 2020 (Confirmed December 19, 2019, voice vote)	
Privacy and Civil Liberties Oversight Board
Chairman of the Privacy and Civil Liberties Oversight Board	Adam Klein	October 2018 (Confirmed October 11, 2018, voice vote)	
Member of the Privacy and Civil Liberties Oversight Board	Edward Felten	October 2018 (Confirmed October 11, 2018, voice vote)	
Member of the Privacy and Civil Liberties Oversight Board	Edward Felten	TBD (Confirmed June 27, 2019, voice vote) (Reappointment)	
Member of the Privacy and Civil Liberties Oversight Board	Jane Nitze	October 2018 (Confirmed October 11, 2018, voice vote)	
Member of the Privacy and Civil Liberties Oversight Board	Aditya Bamzai	TBD (Confirmed June 27, 2019, voice vote)	
Member of the Privacy and Civil Liberties Oversight Board	Travis LeBlanc	TBD (Confirmed June 27, 2019, voice vote)	
Public Buildings Reform Board
Members of the Public Buildings Reform Board	Angela B. Styles	July 2018	
Members of the Public Buildings Reform Board	Talmage Hocker	July 2018	
Members of the Public Buildings Reform Board	Nick Rahall	July 2018	
Members of the Public Buildings Reform Board	Mary Phillips	December 2018	
Members of the Public Buildings Reform Board	David Winstead	January 2019	
Railroad Retirement Board
Chairman of the Railroad Retirement Board	Erhard R. Chorlé	February 6, 2019 (Confirmed January 2, 2019 voice vote)	
Member of the Railroad Retirement Board (Employee Representative)	Johnathan Bragg	February 5, 2019 (Confirmed January 2, 2019 voice vote)	
Member of the Railroad Retirement Board (Carrier Representative)	Thomas Jayne	February 4, 2019 (Confirmed January 2, 2019 voice vote)	
Social Security Advisory Board
Member of the Social Security Advisory Board	Michael J. Astrue		
Member of the Social Security Advisory Board	Jason J. Fichtner	Upon Senate confirmation	
Southern States Energy Board
Federal Representative to the Southern States Energy Board	Eddie Joe Williams	November 15, 2017	
Board of Trustees of the Federal Hospital Insurance Trust Fund
Member of the Board of Trustees of the Federal Hospital Insurance Trust Fund	James B. Lockhart III	Upon Senate confirmation	
Board of Trustees of the Federal Supplementary Medical Insurance Trust Fund
Member of the Board of Trustees of the Federal Supplementary Medical Insurance Trust Fund	James B. Lockhart III	Upon Senate confirmation	

=== Independent commissions ===
Office	Nominee	Assumed office	Left office
American Battle Monuments Commission
Member of the American Battle Monuments Commission	William M. Matz Jr.	April 11, 2018	
Member of the American Battle Monuments Commission	Tom Hicks	April 11, 2018	
Member of the American Battle Monuments Commission	John P. McGoff	April 11, 2018	
Member of the American Battle Monuments Commission	Evans C. Spiceland	April 11, 2018	
Member of the American Battle Monuments Commission	Robert Wefald	April 11, 2018	
Member of the American Battle Monuments Commission	Jennifer Carroll	April 11, 2018	
Member of the American Battle Monuments Commission	Dorothy Gray	April 11, 2018	
Member of the American Battle Monuments Commission	Luis R. Quinonez	April 11, 2018	
Member of the American Battle Monuments Commission	David Urban	May 1, 2018	
Member of the American Battle Monuments Commission	Benjamin Cassidy	June 2018	
Member of the American Battle Monuments Commission	Robert L. Ord	August 2018	
Appalachian Regional Commission
Co-chair of the Appalachian Regional Commission	Tim Thomas	April 3, 2018 (Confirmed March 22, 2018, voice vote)	
Commodity Futures Trading Commission
Chairman of the Commodity Futures Trading Commission	Heath Tarbert	July 15, 2019 (Confirmed June 5, 2019, 84–9)	
Commissioner of the Commodity Futures Trading Commission	Heath Tarbert	July 15, 2019 (Confirmed June 5, 2019, 84–9)	
Commissioner of the Commodity Futures Trading Commission	Brian Quintenz	August 15, 2017 (Confirmed August 3, 2017, voice vote)	
Commissioner of the Commodity Futures Trading Commission	Dawn DeBerry Stump	September 5, 2018 (Confirmed August 28, 2018, voice vote)	
Commissioner of the Commodity Futures Trading Commission	Rostin Behnam	September 6, 2017 (Confirmed August 3, 2017, voice vote)	
Commissioner of the Commodity Futures Trading Commission	Dan Berkovitz	September 7, 2018 (Confirmed August 28, 2018, voice vote)	
Consumer Product Safety Commission
Chairwoman of the Consumer Product Safety Commission	Nancy B. Beck	Upon senate confirmation	
Commissioner of the Consumer Product Safety Commission	Dana Baiocco	June 1, 2018 (Confirmed May 22, 2018, 50–45)	
Commissioner of the Consumer Product Safety Commission	Peter Feldman	October 5, 2018 (Confirmed September 25, 2018, 80–19) (Confirmed to a full term September 26, 2018, 51–49)	
Election Assistance Commission
Member of the Election Assistance Commission	Benjamin Hovland	February 6, 2019 (Confirmed January 2, 2019, voice vote)	
Member of the Election Assistance Commission	Donald L. Palmer	February 6, 2019 (Confirmed January 2, 2019, voice vote)	
Equal Employment Opportunity Commission
Chairman of the Equal Employment Opportunity Commission	Janet Dhillon	May 15, 2019 (Confirmed May 8, 2019, 50–43)	
Commissioner of the Equal Employment Opportunity Commission	Charlotte Burrows	TBD (Confirmed August 1, 2019, voice vote)	
Commissioner of the Equal Employment Opportunity Commission	Andrea R. Lucas	TBD (Confirmed September 22, 2020, 49-44)	
Commissioner of the Equal Employment Opportunity Commission	Jocelyn Samuels	TBD (Confirmed September 23, 2020, 54-42)	
Commissioner of the Equal Employment Opportunity Commission	Keith E. Sonderling	September 30, 2020 (Confirmed September 22, 2020, 52-41)	
General Counsel of the Equal Employment Opportunity Commission	Sharon Fast Gustafson	March 5, 2021 (Confirmed August 1, 2019, voice vote)	
Federal Communications Commission
Chairman of the Federal Communications Commission	Ajit V. Pai	October 2, 2017 (Confirmed October 2, 2017 for second term, 52–41)	
Commissioner of the Federal Communications Commission	Brendan Carr	August 11, 2017 (Confirmed August 3, 2017, voice vote) (Carr confirmed for another term January 2, 2019)	
Commissioner of the Federal Communications Commission	Jessica Rosenworcel	August 11, 2017 (Confirmed August 3, 2017, voice vote) (Carr confirmed for another term January 2, 2019)	
Commissioner of the Federal Communications Commission	Geoffrey Starks	January 30, 2019 (Confirmed January 2, 2019, voice vote)	
Commissioner of the Federal Communications Commission	Nathan A. Simington	TBD (Confirmed December 8, 2020, 49-46)	
Federal Election Commission
Commissioner of the Federal Election Commission	James E. Trainor III	May 19, 2020 (Confirmed May 19, 2020, 49–43)	
Federal Maritime Commission
Member of the Federal Maritime Commission	Dan Maffei	January 23, 2019 (Confirmed January 2, 2019, voice vote)	
Member of the Federal Maritime Commission	Louis E. Sola	January 23, 2019 (Confirmed January 2, 2019, voice vote)	
Member of the Federal Maritime Commission	Carl Bentzel	December 9, 2019 (Confirmed November 21, 2019, voice vote)	
Federal Mine Safety and Health Review Commission
Chairman of the Federal Mine Safety and Health Review Commission	Marco M. Rajkovich Jr.	March 25, 2019 (Confirmed March 14, 2019, voice vote)	
Member of the Federal Mine Safety and Health Review Commission	William Althen	March 25, 2019 (Confirmed March 14, 2019, voice vote) (Reappointment)	
Member of the Federal Mine Safety and Health Review Commission	Arthur Traynor	March 25, 2019 (Confirmed March 14, 2019, voice vote)	
Federal Trade Commission
Chairman of the Federal Trade Commission	Joseph Simons	May 1, 2018 (Confirmed April 26, 2018, voice vote)	
Commissioner of the Federal Trade Commission	Joseph Simons	May 1, 2018 (Confirmed April 26, 2018, voice vote)	
Commissioner of the Federal Trade Commission	Rohit Chopra	May 2, 2017 (Confirmed April 26, 2018, voice vote)	
Commissioner of the Federal Trade Commission	Noah Joshua Phillips	May 2, 2017 (Confirmed April 26, 2018, voice vote)	
Commissioner of the Federal Trade Commission	Christine S. Wilson	September 26, 2018 (Confirmed April 26, 2018, voice vote)	
Commissioner of the Federal Trade Commission	Rebecca Slaughter	May 2, 2017 (Confirmed April 26, 2018, voice vote)	
United States Commission of Fine Arts
Member of the Commission of Fine Arts	Justin Shubow	September 2018	
Frederick Douglass Bicentennial Commission
Member of the Frederick Douglass Bicentennial Commission	Alveda King		
Member of the Frederick Douglass Bicentennial Commission	Eric Madison Lowery		
Member of the Frederick Douglass Bicentennial Commission	Naomi C. Earp		
Member of the Frederick Douglass Bicentennial Commission	Dean Brode Nelson		
Great Lakes Fishery Commission
Commissioner of the Great Lakes Fishery Commission	Charles M. Wooley	November 2018	
National Indian Gaming Commission
Chairman of the National Indian Gaming Commission	E. Sequoyah Simermeyer	TBD (Confirmed November 21, 2019, voice vote)	
International Joint Commission
Commissioner of the International Joint Commission for United States and Canada	Jane Corwin	TBD (Confirmed May 16, 2019, voice vote)	
Commissioner of the International Joint Commission for United States and Canada	Robert C. Sisson	TBD (Confirmed May 16, 2019, voice vote)	
Commissioner of the International Joint Commission for United States and Canada	Lance V. Yohe	TBD (Confirmed May 16, 2019, voice vote)	
United States Commission on International Religious Freedom
Member of the United States Commission on International Religious Freedom	Gary Bauer	May 2018	
Member of the United States Commission on International Religious Freedom	Nadine Maenza	May 2018	
Member of the United States Commission on International Religious Freedom	Johnnie Moore Jr.	May 2018	
International Trade Commission
Commissioner of the International Trade Commission	Jason Kearns	April 2, 2018 (Confirmed March 1, 2018, voice vote)	
Commissioner of the International Trade Commission	Amy Karpel	TBD (Confirmed August 1, 2019, voice vote)	
Commissioner of the International Trade Commission	Randolph J. Stayin	TBD (Confirmed August 1, 2019, voice vote)	
National Commission on Military Aviation Safety
Member of the National Commission on Military Aviation Safety	Scott C. Donnelly	November 2018	
Member of the National Commission on Military Aviation Safety	Joe Hagin	November 2018	
Member of the National Commission on Military Aviation Safety	Richard F. Healing	November 2018	
Member of the National Commission on Military Aviation Safety	Dabney Kern	November 2018	
Mississippi River Commission
President of the Mississippi River Commission	Richard G. Kaiser	September 2017	
Member of the Mississippi River Commission	James A. Reeder		
Member of the Mississippi River Commission	Paul E. Owen		
Northern Border Regional Commission
Federal Co-chairperson of the Northern Border Regional Commission	Harold B. Parker	October 17, 2018 (Confirmed October 11, 2018, voice vote)	
Nuclear Regulatory Commission
Chairwoman of the Nuclear Regulatory Commission	Kristine Svinicki	January 23, 2017 (Confirmed July 1, 2017 for third term, 88–9)	
Commissioner of the Nuclear Regulatory Commission	Jeff Baran	May 29, 2018 (Confirmed May 24, 2018 for reappointment, voice vote)	
Commissioner of the Nuclear Regulatory Commission	Annie Caputo	May 29, 2018 (Confirmed May 24, 2018, voice vote)	
Commissioner of the Nuclear Regulatory Commission	David A. Wright	May 29, 2018 (Confirmed May 24, 2018, voice vote) (Re-confirmed May 21, 2020, voice vote)	
Commissioner of the Nuclear Regulatory Commission	Christopher T. Hanson	TBD (Confirmed May 21, 2020, voice vote)	
Inspector General, Nuclear Regulatory Commission	Robert J. Feitel	TBD (Confirmed May 4, 2020, 87–0)	
Occupational Safety and Health Review Commission
Chairwoman of the Occupational Safety and Health Review Commission	Heather MacDougall	August 3, 2017 (Confirmed August 3, 2017, voice vote)	April 6, 2019
Commissioner of the Occupational Safety and Health Review Commission	James Sullivan	August 3, 2017 (Confirmed August 3, 2017, voice vote)	
Commissioner of the Occupational Safety and Health Review Commission	Amanda Wood Laihow	TBD (Confirmed January 9, 2020, voice vote)	
Commissioner of the Occupational Safety and Health Review Commission	Cynthia L. Attwood	TBD (Confirmed January 9, 2020, voice vote) (reappointment)	
Postal Regulatory Commission
Commissioner of the Postal Regulatory Commission	Michael Kubayanda	January 29, 2019 (Confirmed January 2, 2019, voice vote)	
Commissioner of the Postal Regulatory Commission	Ann C. Fisher	August 8, 2019 (Confirmed August 1, 2019, voice vote)	
Commissioner of the Postal Regulatory Commission	Ashley Poling	August 8, 2019 (Confirmed August 1, 2019, voice vote)	
Interstate Commission on the Potomac River Basin
Member of the Interstate Commission on the Potomac River Basin	Jeffrey L. Milhorn	November 2018	
U.S. Commission for the Preservation of America's Heritage Abroad
Member of the Commission for the Preservation of America's Heritage Abroad	Heshie Billet	Reappointment (Tenure began in 2016)	
Member of the Commission for the Preservation of America's Heritage Abroad	Paul Packer	October 2017	
Securities and Exchange Commission
Chairman of the Securities and Exchange Commission	Jay Clayton	May 4, 2017 (Confirmed May 2, 2017, 61–37)	
Member of the Securities and Exchange Commission	Hester Peirce	January 11, 2018 (Confirmed December 21, 2017, voice vote) (Confirmed August 6, 2020, voice vote)	
Member of the Securities and Exchange Commission	Allison Lee	July 8, 2019 (Confirmed June 20, 2019, voice vote)	
Member of the Securities and Exchange Commission	Elad Roisman	September 11, 2018 (Confirmed September 5, 2018, 85–14)	
Member of the Securities and Exchange Commission	Caroline A. Crenshaw	August 17, 2020 (Confirmed August 6, 2020, voice vote)	
United States Semiquincentennial Commission
Chairman of the United States Semiquincentennial Commission	Daniel M. DiLella	March 2018	
United States Sentencing Commission
Chair of the United States Sentencing Commission	Kevin Michael Moore	TBD	
Member of the United States Sentencing Commission	Charles R. Breyer	March 21, 2017 (Confirmed March 21, 2017 for second term, 98–0)	
Member of the United States Sentencing Commission	Danny C. Reeves	March 21, 2017 (Confirmed March 21, 2017 for second term, 98–0)	
Member of the United States Sentencing Commission	Claria Horn Boom	TBD	
Member of the United States Sentencing Commission	Henry E. Hudson	TBD	
Member of the United States Sentencing Commission	John G. Malcolm	TBD	
Member of the United States Sentencing Commission	Luis Felipe Restrepo	TBD	
Commission on Social Impact Partnerships
Chairman of the Commission on Social Impact Partnerships	Paul Bradford Edgerley	June 2018	
Women's Suffrage Centennial Commission
Member of the Women's Suffrage Centennial Commission	Jovita Carranza	August 2018	
Member of the Women's Suffrage Centennial Commission	Kay Coles James	September 2018	

=== Independent committees ===
Office	Nominee	Assumed office	Left office
John F. Kennedy Center for the Performing Arts
Member of the Advisory Committee on the Arts of the John F. Kennedy Center for the Performing Arts	Pamella DeVos	October 2017	
Member of the Advisory Committee on the Arts of the John F. Kennedy Center for the Performing Arts	Frederick Jubitz	October 2017	
Member of the Advisory Committee on the Arts of the John F. Kennedy Center for the Performing Arts	Michael Lorber	October 2017	
Member of the Advisory Committee on the Arts of the John F. Kennedy Center for the Performing Arts	Anne N. Reyes	October 2017	
Member of the Advisory Committee on the Arts of the John F. Kennedy Center for the Performing Arts	Stephanie Spencer	October 2017	
Member of the Advisory Committee on the Arts of the John F. Kennedy Center for the Performing Arts	Frank Giordano	October 2017	
Member of the Advisory Committee on the Arts of the John F. Kennedy Center for the Performing Arts	Vance Thompson	October 2017	
Member of the Advisory Committee on the Arts of the John F. Kennedy Center for the Performing Arts	Geoffrey K. Verhoff	October 2017	
Member of the Advisory Committee on the Arts of the John F. Kennedy Center for the Performing Arts	Rene Augustine	December 2018	
Member of the Advisory Committee on the Arts of the John F. Kennedy Center for the Performing Arts	Annette Shelby	December 2018	
Member of the Advisory Committee on the Arts of the John F. Kennedy Center for the Performing Arts	Lee Greenwood	November 2019	
Committee for Purchase from People Who Are Blind or Severely Disabled
Army Representative on the Committee for Purchase from People Who Are Blind or Severely Disabled	Stuart A. Hazlett	December 2018	

=== Independent councils ===
Office	Nominee	Assumed office	Left office
National Council on Disability
Member of the National Council on Disability	Neil Romano	March 8, 2018 (Appointed February 21, 2018)	
Federal Permitting Improvement Steering Council
Executive Director of the Federal Permitting Improvement Steering Council	Alexander Herrgott	September 2018	
Federal Salary Council
Vice Chair of the Federal Salary Council	Jill L. Nelson	September 2018	
Advisory Council on Historic Preservation
Chair of the Advisory Council on Historic Preservation	Aimee Kathryn Jorjani	July 22, 2019 (Confirmed June 27, 2019, voice vote)	
Member of the Advisory Council on Historic Preservation	Robert Eugene Simison		
United States Holocaust Memorial Council
Chairman of the United States Holocaust Memorial Council	Howard Lorber	May 31, 2017 (Appointed May 10, 2018)	
Member of the United States Holocaust Memorial Council	Andrew M. Cohn	TBD (Appointed December 14, 2018)	
Member of the United States Holocaust Memorial Council	Helene Feldman	TBD (Appointed December 14, 2018)	
Member of the United States Holocaust Memorial Council	Murray J. Laulicht	TBD (Appointed December 14, 2018)	
Member of the United States Holocaust Memorial Council	Betty Pantirer Schwartz	TBD (Appointed December 14, 2018)	
Member of the United States Holocaust Memorial Council	Bradley D. Wine	TBD (Appointed December 14, 2018)	
Member of the United States Holocaust Memorial Council	Jonathan W. Burkan	TBD (Appointed February 13, 2019)	
Member of the United States Holocaust Memorial Council	Sam M. Devinki	TBD (Appointed February 13, 2019)	
Member of the United States Holocaust Memorial Council	David M. Flaum	TBD (Appointed February 13, 2019)	
Member of the United States Holocaust Memorial Council	Jeremy Halpern	TBD (Appointed February 13, 2019)	
Member of the United States Holocaust Memorial Council	Fred S. Zeidman	TBD (Appointed February 21, 2019)	
Member of the United States Holocaust Memorial Council	Adam E. Beren	TBD (Appointed October 23, 2019)	
Member of the United States Holocaust Memorial Council	Joshua Bolten	TBD (Appointed October 23, 2019)	
Member of the United States Holocaust Memorial Council	Sonia Marilyn Breslow	TBD (Appointed October 23, 2019)	
Member of the United States Holocaust Memorial Council	Ari Fleischer	TBD (Appointed October 23, 2019)	
Member of the United States Holocaust Memorial Council	Adele Malpass	TBD (Appointed October 23, 2019)	
Member of the United States Holocaust Memorial Council	Frederick R. Marcus	TBD (Appointed October 23, 2019)	
Member of the United States Holocaust Memorial Council	Irvin Shapell	TBD (Appointed October 23, 2019)	
Member of the United States Holocaust Memorial Council	Ronald Weiser	TBD (Appointed October 23, 2019)	
National Endowment for the Arts
Chairperson of the National Endowment for the Arts	Mary Anne Carter	TBD (Confirmed August 1, 2019, voice vote)	
Member of the National Council on the Arts	Charles Wickser Banta	Upon Senate confirmation	
Member of the National Council on the Arts	Michelle Itczak	Upon Senate confirmation	
Member of the National Council on the Arts	Barbara Coleen Long	Upon Senate confirmation	
Member of the National Council on the Arts	Carleton Varney	Upon Senate confirmation	
National Infrastructure Advisory Council
Member of the National Infrastructure Advisory Council	William Fehrman		
Member of the National Infrastructure Advisory Council	Joseph R. Baich		
Member of the National Infrastructure Advisory Council	Daniel P. Walsh		

=== Independent offices ===
Office	Nominee	Assumed office	Left office
Office of Government Ethics
Director of the Office of Government Ethics	Emory A. Rounds III	July 13, 2018 (Confirmed July 12, 2018, voice vote)	
Office of Personnel Management
Director of the Office of Personnel Management	Margaret Weichert	October 2018	
Deputy Director of the Office of Personnel Management	Michael Rigas		
Inspector General of the Office of Personnel Management	John Edward Dupuy	Upon Senate confirmation	
Member of the Federal Salary Council	Ronald Sanders		
Member of the Federal Salary Council	Katja Bullock		
Office of Special Counsel
Special Counsel of the Office of Special Counsel	Henry Kerner	October 30, 2017 (Confirmed October 16, 2017, voice vote)	
United States Government Publishing Office
Director of the Government Publishing Office	Hugh N. Halpern	TBD (Confirmed December 4, 2019, voice vote)	
Institute of Museum and Library Services
Director of the Institute of Museum and Library Services	Crosby Kemper III	TBD (Confirmed January 9, 2020, voice vote)	

=== Independent miscellaneous ===
Office	Nominee	Assumed office	Left office
Farm Credit Administration
Member of the Farm Credit Administration	Glen R. Smith	December 14, 2017 (Confirmed December 5, 2017, voice vote)	
Member of the Farm Credit Administration	Charles A. Stones	TBD (Confirmed December 18, 2020, voice vote)	
Member of the Farm Credit Administration	Rodney K. Brown	Upon Senate confirmation	
General Services Administration
Administrator of General Services	Emily W. Murphy	December 12, 2017 (Confirmed December 5, 2017, voice vote)	
National Credit Union Administration
Member of the National Credit Union Administration	Rodney Hood	April 8, 2019 (Confirmed March 14, 2019, voice vote)	
Member of the National Credit Union Administration	Todd Harper	April 8, 2019 (Confirmed March 14, 2019, voice vote)	
Member of the National Credit Union Administration	Kyle Hauptman	TBD (Confirmed December 2, 2020, 56-39)	
Social Security Administration
Commissioner of the Social Security Administration	Andrew Saul	June 17, 2019 (Confirmed June 4, 2019, 77–16)	
Deputy Commissioner of the Social Security Administration	David Fabian Black	TBD (Confirmed September 24, 2019, 68–26)	
Inspector General of the Social Security Administration	Gail S. Ennis	February 4, 2019 (Confirmed January 2, 2019, voice vote)	
Member of the Board of Trustees of the Federal Old-Age and Survivors Insurance Trust Fund	James B. Lockhart III	Upon Senate confirmation	
Member of the Board of Trustees of the Federal Disability Insurance Trust Fund	James B. Lockhart III	Upon Senate confirmation	
Administrative Conference of the United States
Chairman of the Administrative Conference of the United States	Vacant		
Member of the Council of the Administrative Conference of the United States	Donald F. McGahn II	Upon Senate Confirmation	
Member of the Council of the Administrative Conference of the United States	Michael H. McGinley	Upon Senate Confirmation	
Member of the Council of the Administrative Conference of the United States	Jeffrey M. Harris	Upon Senate Confirmation	
Member of the Council of the Administrative Conference of the United States	Nicholas T. Matich IV	December 11, 2018	
Court Services and Offender Supervision Agency
Director of the Agency for Court Services and Offender Supervision Agency	Richard Tischner	February 11, 2019 (Confirmed January 2, 2019, voice vote)	
Federal Housing Finance Agency
Director of the Federal Housing Finance Agency	Mark A. Calabria	April 9, 2019 (Confirmed April 4, 2019, 52–44)	
United States Agency for International Development
Administrator of the United States Agency for International Development	Vacant		
Deputy Administrator of the United States Agency for International Development	Bonnie Glick	January 30, 2019 (Confirmed January 2, 2019, voice vote)	November 6, 2020
Assistant Administrator of the United States Agency for International Development (Africa)	Ramsey Day	TBD (Confirmed August 6, 2020, voice vote)	
Assistant Administrator of the United States Agency for International Development (Europe and Eurasia)	Brock D. Bierman	January 8, 2018 (Confirmed December 21, 2017, voice vote)	
Assistant Administrator of the United States Agency for International Development (Latin America and the Caribbean)	John Barsa	TBD (Confirmed May 23, 2019, voice vote)	
Assistant Administrator of the United States Agency for International Development (Middle East)	Michael T. Harvey	January 30, 2019 (Confirmed January 2, 2019, voice vote)	
Assistant Administrator of the United States Agency for International Development (Democracy, Conflict and Humanitarian Assistance)	Jenny McGee	TBD (Confirmed August 6, 2020, voice vote)	
Assistant Administrator of the United States Agency for International Development (Economic Policy, Economic Growth, Education and Environment)	Michelle Bekkering	TBD (Confirmed December 19, 2019, voice vote)	
Assistant Administrator of the United States Agency for International Development (Global Health)	Alma Golden	TBD (Confirmed March 20, 2020, voice vote)	
Assistant Administrator of the United States Agency for International Development (Legislative and Public Affairs)	Richard C. Parker	June 10, 2019 (Confirmed May 23, 2019, voice vote)	
Member of the Board for International Food and Agricultural Development	Mark E. Keenum	Reappointment (Tenure began in 2016)	
Member of the Board for International Food and Agricultural Development	Richard L. Lackey	Reappointment (Tenure began in 2016)	
Coordinator of United States International Basic Education Assistance	Julie E. Cram	March 2018	
Tahoe Regional Planning Agency
Member of the Governing Board of the Tahoe Regional Planning Agency	A.J. Hicks		
Delta Regional Authority
Federal Co-chairman of the Delta Regional Authority	Christopher Caldwell	January 12, 2018 (Confirmed December 21, 2017, voice vote)	
Alternate Federal Co-chairman of the Delta Regional Authority	Peter Kinder	September 7, 2017; Appointed August 11, 2017	
Federal Labor Relations Authority
Chairman of the Federal Labor Relations Authority	Colleen Kiko	December 11, 2017 (Confirmed November 16, 2017, voice vote)	
Member of the Federal Labor Relations Authority	Ernest W. DuBester	November 16, 2017 (Confirmed November 16, 2017, voice vote)	
Member of the Federal Labor Relations Authority	James T. Abbott	December 11, 2017 (Confirmed November 16, 2017, voice vote)	
General Counsel of the Federal Labor Relations Authority	Catherine Bird	Upon Senate confirmation	
Metropolitan Washington Airports Authority
Member of the Board of Directors of the Metropolitan Washington Airports Authority	Alan E. Cobb	Upon Senate confirmation	
Member of the Board of Directors of the Metropolitan Washington Airports Authority	William Shaw McDermott	Upon Senate confirmation	
Tennessee Valley Authority
Member of the Board of Directors of the Tennessee Valley Authority	Kenneth E. Allen	January 11, 2018 (Confirmed December 21, 2017, voice vote)	
Member of the Board of Directors of the Tennessee Valley Authority	A. D. Frazier	January 9, 2018 (Confirmed December 21, 2017, voice vote)	
Member of the Board of Directors of the Tennessee Valley Authority	William Kilbride	August 8, 2019 (Confirmed August 1, 2019, voice vote)	
Member of the Board of Directors of the Tennessee Valley Authority	John L. Ryder	March 20, 2019 (Confirmed February 28, 2019, voice vote)	
Member of the Board of Directors of the Tennessee Valley Authority	Jeffrey Smith	January 11, 2018 (Confirmed December 21, 2017, voice vote)	
Member of the Board of Directors of the Tennessee Valley Authority	James R. Thompson III	January 12, 2018 (Confirmed December 21, 2017, voice vote)	
U.S. Agency for Global Media
Chief Executive Officer of the U.S. Agency for Global Media	Michael Pack	June 5, 2020 (Confirmed June 4, 2020, 53–38)	
Consumer Financial Protection Bureau
Director of the Consumer Finance Protection Bureau	Kathy Kraninger	December 10, 2018 (Confirmed December 6, 2018, 50–49)	
Legal Services Corporation
Member of the Board of Directors of the Legal Services Corporation	Robert J. Grey Jr.	TBD (Confirmed August 1, 2019, voice vote)	
Member of the Board of Directors of the Legal Services Corporation	Matthew D. Keenan	TBD (Confirmed August 1, 2019, voice vote)	
Member of the Board of Directors of the Legal Services Corporation	Abigail Kuzma	TBD (Confirmed August 1, 2019, voice vote)	
Member of the Board of Directors of the Legal Services Corporation	John G. Levi	TBD (Confirmed August 1, 2019, voice vote)	
Member of the Board of Directors of the Legal Services Corporation	John G. Malcolm	TBD (Confirmed August 1, 2019, voice vote)	
Member of the Board of Directors of the Legal Services Corporation	Frank X. Neuner Jr.	TBD (Confirmed August 1, 2019, voice vote)	
Member of the Board of Directors of the Legal Services Corporation	Julie Reiskin	TBD (Confirmed August 1, 2019, voice vote)	
Member of the Board of Directors of the Legal Services Corporation	Gloria Valencia-Weber	TBD (Confirmed August 1, 2019, voice vote)	
Millennium Challenge Corporation
Chief Executive Officer of the Millennium Challenge Corporation	Sean Cairncross	June 24, 2019 (Confirmed June 18, 2019, 59–37)	
Member of the Millennium Challenge Corporation	Mike Johanns	TBD (Confirmed June 13, 2019, voice vote) (Reappointment)	
Member of the Millennium Challenge Corporation	Susan McCue	TBD (Confirmed June 13, 2019, voice vote) (Reappointment)	
Member of the Millennium Challenge Corporation	Ander Crenshaw	TBD (Confirmed June 13, 2019, voice vote) (Reappointment)	
Member of the Millennium Challenge Corporation	George M. Marcus	TBD (Confirmed June 13, 2019, voice vote) (Reappointment)	
Corporation for National and Community Service
Chief Executive Officer of the Corporation for National and Community Service	Barbara Stewart	February 20, 2018 (Confirmed February 7, 2018, voice vote)	
Member of the Board of Directors of the Corporation for National and Community Service	Victoria Ann Hughes	Upon Senate confirmation (Reappointment; tenure began in 2016)	
Member of the Board of Directors of the Corporation for National and Community Service	Heather Reynolds	Upon Senate confirmation (Reappointment; tenure began in 2016)	
Overseas Private Investment Corporation
President and CEO of the OPIC	David Bohigian	March 2019	
Executive Vice President of the OPIC	David Bohigian	September 5, 2017 (Confirmed August 3, 2017, voice vote)	
Member of the Board of Directors of the Overseas Private Investment Corporation	Christopher Vincze	July 10, 2019 (Confirmed June 13, 2019, voice vote)	
Small Business Member of the Board of Directors of the OPIC	Frederick Perpall	Upon Senate confirmation	
Public Member of the Board of Directors of the OPIC	Irving Bailey	July 10, 2019 (Confirmed June 13, 2019, voice vote)	
Corporation for Public Broadcasting
Member of the Board of Directors of the Corporation for Public Broadcasting	Ruby Calvert	May 2018 (Confirmed May 24, 2018, voice vote)	
Member of the Board of Directors of the Corporation for Public Broadcasting	Laura G. Ross	May 2018 (Confirmed May 24, 2018, voice vote)	
Member of the Board of Directors of the Corporation for Public Broadcasting	Bruce Ramer	TBD (Confirmed March 14, 2019, voice vote)	
Member of the Board of Directors of the Corporation for Public Broadcasting	Janice Miriam Hellreich	TBD (Confirmed March 14, 2019, voice vote)	
Member of the Board of Directors of the Corporation for Public Broadcasting	Robert A. Mandell	TBD (Confirmed March 14, 2019, voice vote)	
Member of the Board of Directors of the Corporation for Public Broadcasting	Don Munce	Upon Senate confirmation	
Peace Corps
Director of the Peace Corps	Jody Olsen	March 30, 2018 (Confirmed March 22, 2018, voice vote)	
Deputy Director of the Peace Corps	Alan Swendiman	Upon Senate confirmation	
National Science Foundation
Director of the National Science Foundation	Sethuraman Panchanathan	June 23, 2020 (Confirmed June 18, 2020, voice vote)	
Member of the National Science Board	Maureen L. Condic	November 2018	
Member of the National Science Board	Suresh V. Garimella	November 2018	
Member of the National Science Board	Steven Leath	November 2018	
Member of the National Science Board	Geraldine L. Richmond	November 2018	
Member of the National Science Board	Alan Stern	November 2018	
Member of the National Science Board	Stephen Willard	November 2018	
Member of the National Science Board	Maria Zuber	November 2018	
International Monetary Fund
Governor of the International Monetary Fund	Steven Mnuchin	April 2018 (Confirmed March 22, 2018, voice vote)	
United States Executive Director of the International Monetary Fund	sMark Rosen	Upon Senate confirmation	
National Endowment for the Humanities
Chairperson of the National Endowment for the Humanities	Jon Parrish Peede	May 3, 2018 (Confirmed April 26, 2018, voice vote)	
Member of the National Council on the Humanities	David Armand DeKeyser	TBD (Confirmed August 1, 2019, voice vote)	
Member of the National Council on the Humanities	Phyllis Kaminsky	TBD (Confirmed August 1, 2019, voice vote)	
Member of the National Council on the Humanities	Kim Holmes	TBD (Confirmed August 1, 2019, voice vote)	
Member of the National Council on the Humanities	Jean M. Yarbrough	TBD (Confirmed August 1, 2019, voice vote)	
Member of the National Council on the Humanities	Keegan Callanan	TBD (Confirmed August 1, 2019, voice vote)	
Member of the National Council on the Humanities	Kathe Hicks Albrecht	TBD (Confirmed August 1, 2019, voice vote)	
Member of the National Council on the Humanities	Russell Berman	TBD (Confirmed August 1, 2019, voice vote)	
Member of the National Council on the Humanities	William English	TBD (Confirmed August 1, 2019, voice vote)	
Member of the National Council on the Humanities	Marjorie Fisher Furman	TBD (Confirmed August 1, 2019, voice vote)	
Member of the National Council on the Humanities	John Fonte	TBD (Confirmed August 1, 2019, voice vote)	
Member of the National Council on the Humanities	Claire Griffin	TBD (Confirmed August 1, 2019, voice vote)	
Member of the National Council on the Humanities	Joyce Lee Malcolm	TBD (Confirmed August 1, 2019, voice vote)	
Member of the National Council on the Humanities	Adair Margo	TBD (Confirmed August 1, 2019, voice vote)	
Member of the National Council on the Humanities	Matthew Rose	TBD (Confirmed August 1, 2019, voice vote)	
Member of the National Council on the Humanities	William Schneider Jr.	TBD (Confirmed August 1, 2019, voice vote)	
Member of the National Council on the Humanities	Noël Valis	TBD (Confirmed August 1, 2019, voice vote)	
Federal Mediation and Conciliation Service
Director of the Federal Mediation and Conciliation Service	Richard Giacolone	June 12, 2018	August 13, 2020
Director of the Federal Mediation and Conciliation Service	Richard Giacolone	TBD (Confirmed August 13, 2020, voice vote)	
United States Postal Service
Member of the Board of Governors of the United States Postal Service	Mike Duncan	September 13, 2018 (Confirmed August 28, 2018, voice vote; reappointment confirmed December 5, 2019, 89–0)	
Member of the Board of Governors of the United States Postal Service	David C. Williams	September 13, 2018 (Confirmed August 28, 2018, voice vote)	
Member of the Board of Governors of the United States Postal Service	John McLeod Barger	August 20, 2019 (Confirmed August 1, 2019, voice vote)	
Member of the Board of Governors of the United States Postal Service	Ron Bloom	August 20, 2019 (Confirmed August 1, 2019, voice vote)	
Member of the Board of Governors of the United States Postal Service	Roman Martinez IV	August 20, 2019 (Confirmed August 1, 2019, voice vote)	
Member of the Board of Governors of the United States Postal Service	William Zollars	TBD (Confirmed June 18, 2020, voice vote)	
Member of the Board of Governors of the United States Postal Service	Donald Lee Moak	TBD (Confirmed June 18, 2020, voice vote)	
Selective Service System
Director of the Selective Service System	Don Benton	April 13, 2017 (Appointed April 11, 2017)	
United Service Organizations
Member of the Board of Governors of the United Service Organizations	Karen Kelly	January 2019	
Member of the Board of Governors of the United Service Organizations	Jayne H. Plank	January 2019	
Architect of the Capitol
Architect of the Capitol	J. Brett Blanton	January 16, 2020 (Confirmed December 19, 2019, voice vote)	
Federal Agricultural Mortgage Corporation
Member of the Board of Directors	LaJuana S. Wilcher	TBD (Confirmed December 19, 2019, voice vote)	
U.S. International Development Finance Corporation
Chief Executive Officer	Adam Boehler	December 20, 2019 (Confirmed September 26, 2019, voice vote)	
Deputy Chief Executive Officer	Edward Burrier	Upon Senate confirmation	
Council on Juvenile Justice and Delinquency Prevention
	Grady Judd	December 22, 2020	

== Appointees who have resigned or have been dismissed ==
Three of Trump's 15 original cabinet members left within his first year. Health and Human Services secretary Tom Price was forced to resign in September 2017 due to excessive use of private charter jets and military aircraft. Environmental Protection Agency administrator Scott Pruitt resigned in 2018 and Secretary of the Interior Ryan Zinke in January 2019 amid multiple investigations into their conduct.

== Pace of appointments and approvals ==
While President Trump tweeted on February 7, 2017, dissatisfaction – "It is a disgrace my Cabinet is not yet in place, the longest such delay in the history of our country"—the assertion was considered false by the BBC based on a detailed review of the last five administrations. The analysis found more room for a general complaint of slowness in congressional action and that the administration "has by far the fewest confirmed cabinet selections at this point" but it also noted that, beyond the non-action on Judge Merrick Garland's 10-month nomination to the Supreme Court by Trump's predecessor, President Obama's "choice for Labor secretary, Thomas Perez, took 121 days to be confirmed. John Bryson, his commerce pick, waited 126 days. Attorney General Loretta Lynch holds the modern record, as 161 days passed before getting Senate approval."

In an update on the March 2017 nomination of J. Christopher Giancarlo to the CFTC, the White House submitted his paperwork to the Senate committee in early May. "The paperwork is a prerequisite for the panel to advance the nomination with a hearing and an eventual committee vote, which now may not come until the summer or fall. The committee is said to be waiting for the administration to nominate individuals to fill two more vacancies at the commission before it holds the hearing, according to Senate aides and people familiar with the process," reported the Wall Street Journal.

In July 2017, the New York Times assessed the pace and reported that Trump had announced 36 percent of "leadership positions below the secretary level" compared with 78 percent by Obama over the same period. Average approval time has been nine days slower for Trump appointees versus Obama's. Ten of 15 Cabinet agencies had no number two, several deputy secretaries were not nominated until after the Administration's 100-day mark, and some had not yet been nominated.

By October 2017, Trump had made 412 nominations. By the same point in their respective presidencies, George W. Bush had made 640 nominations and Barack Obama had made 536 nominations.

In May 2018, assessing the administration's overall personnel approach, Evan Osnos reported in The New Yorker that "more than half of the six hundred and fifty-six most critical positions are still unfilled." He quoted Max Stier of the Partnership for Public Service as saying "We've never seen vacancies at this scale[.] Not anything close."

== Appointment controversies ==
=== Anti-Muslim rhetoric ===
Since 2017 several people with ties to the Center for Security Policy CSP have joined the Trump administration, including Counselor to the President Kellyanne Conway in 2017, chief of staff for the National Security Council Fred Fleitz in 2018, and Deputy National Security Advisor Charles Kupperman in 2019. Kupperman served on the board of directors for CSP between 2001 and 2010. The Trump administration used reports released by the CSP when it proposed to ban all Muslims from entering the United States.

Anthony Tata the Under Secretary of Defense for Policy before his term. In Twitter posts and radio-show appearances in 2017 and 2018, Tata repeatedly made the false claim that President Barack Obama was a "Muslim" and a "terrorist leader"; accused Obama of being "an anti-Semite" who wanted to "destroy Israel" and "did not want" to defeat ISIL; and claimed that the negotiation of the multilateral nuclear agreement with Iran was born by Obama's "Islamic roots".

Pete Hoekstra the United States Ambassador to the Netherlands before his term, made claims in November 2015 at a panel titled "Muslim Migration into Europe: Eurabia come True?" hosted by the David Horowitz Freedom Center that the Netherlands had "no-go zones" and that politicians and cars were being set on fire in the country due to radical Islam.

In 2020, President Donald Trump proposed Douglas Macgregor as ambassador to Germany, but the Senate blocked the nomination. In the past he made comments that disparaged immigrants and refugees, called for martial law at US-Mexico border.

== See also ==
- Republican National Committee chairmanship election, 2017 for the national leadership of Trump's political party
- Donald Trump Supreme Court candidates for the judicial nominees to fill the vacancies formerly held by Antonin Scalia, Anthony Kennedy and Ruth Bader Ginsburg
- Cabinet of Donald Trump, for the vetting process undergone by top-level roles including advice and consent by the Senate
- Sr. Advisor to the President, the role formerly held by Karl Rove under George W. Bush, then by Valerie Jarrett/David Axelrod/etc. under Barack Obama
- List of executive branch 'czars' e.g. Special Advisor to the President
- List of economic advisors to Donald Trump, concentrating on the informal advisors that are not officially part of the Trump administration
- List of federal judges appointed by Donald Trump
- List of short-tenure Donald Trump political appointments
- List of Trump administration appointees who endorsed Joe Biden
- The Fifth Risk - book documenting political appointments at the beginning of the Trump presidency
- Schedule F appointment - aborted Trump plan for reclassifying civil servants as political appointees
