= Amanda Wood Laihow =

U.S. labor lawyer

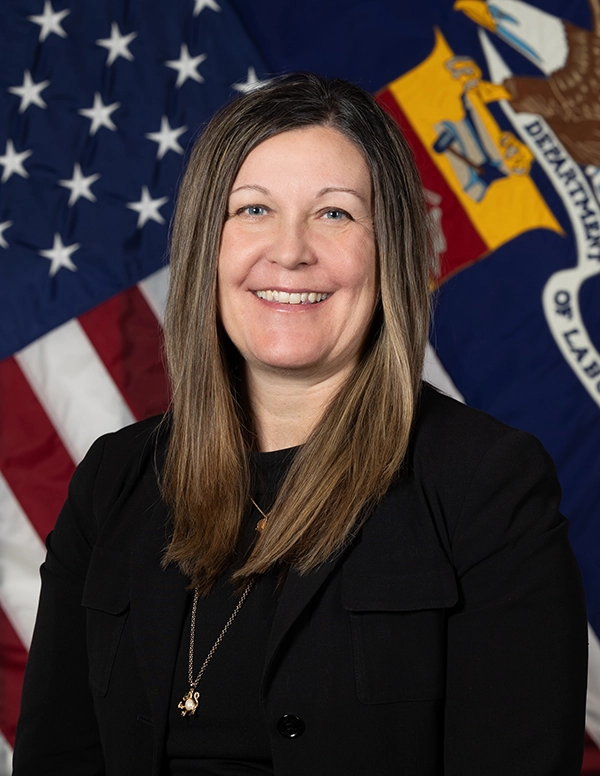

Acting Assistant Secretary for the Occupational Safety and Health Administration
- In office March 12, 2025 – November 5, 2025
- President: Donald Trump
- Preceded by: Douglas L. Parker
- Succeeded by: David Keeling

Member of the Occupational Safety and Health Review Commission
- Former Commissioner
- In office January 21, 2020 – April 27, 2023
- President: Donald Trump; Joe Biden
- Preceded by: Heather L. MacDougall
- Succeeded by: Jonathan Snare

Personal details
- Party: Republican
- Children: 2
- Education: University of New Hampshire (BA); University of Maine School of Law (JD)

Amanda Wood Laihow was the Acting Assistant Secretary for the U.S. Occupational Safety and Health Administration (OSHA). She was previously appointed as Deputy Assistant Secretary for OSHA in February 2025 by President Donald Trump. Prior to this appointment, she served as a member of the Occupational Safety and Health Review Commission (OSHRC) from 2020 to 2023, having been nominated by President Trump in 2019 and confirmed by the U.S. Senate in 2020. She was renominated in July 2023, after her term expired, by President Joe Biden; however, the full United States Senate did not hold a confirmation vote on her appointment and, as of March 2025, the seat she held remains vacant. Laihow previously served as chief counsel to former OSHRC Chair James Sullivan and was the director of labor and employment policy for the National Association of Manufacturers.

== Life ==
A Maine native, Laihow has a BA in political science from the University of New Hampshire and a JD from the University of Maine School of Law.

Laihow was assistant general counsel at the General Services Administration. She later served as deputy general counsel for the United States Senate Committee on Homeland Security and Governmental Affairs. She served as the director of labor and employment policy for the National Association of Manufacturers, where she advocated for labor issues including those pertaining to employee health and safety under the Occupational Safety and Health Act.

Laihow joined the Occupational Safety and Health Review Commission (OSHRC) as the chief counsel to chairman James J. Sullivan, serving as his primary legal advisor on all agency matters. In 2019, Laihow as nominated by US president Donald Trump to complete Heather MacDougall's term on the Occupational Safety and Health Review Commission. Her nomination was confirmed by the United States Senate on January 9, 2020. Her term expired on April 27, 2023. In July 2023, US president Joe Biden renominated Laihow, a Republican, to serve as a member of the OSHRC.

As of July 2023, Laihow lived in Alexandria, Virginia with her husband and two daughters.
