= Philip A. Miscimarra =

American lawyer (born 1956)

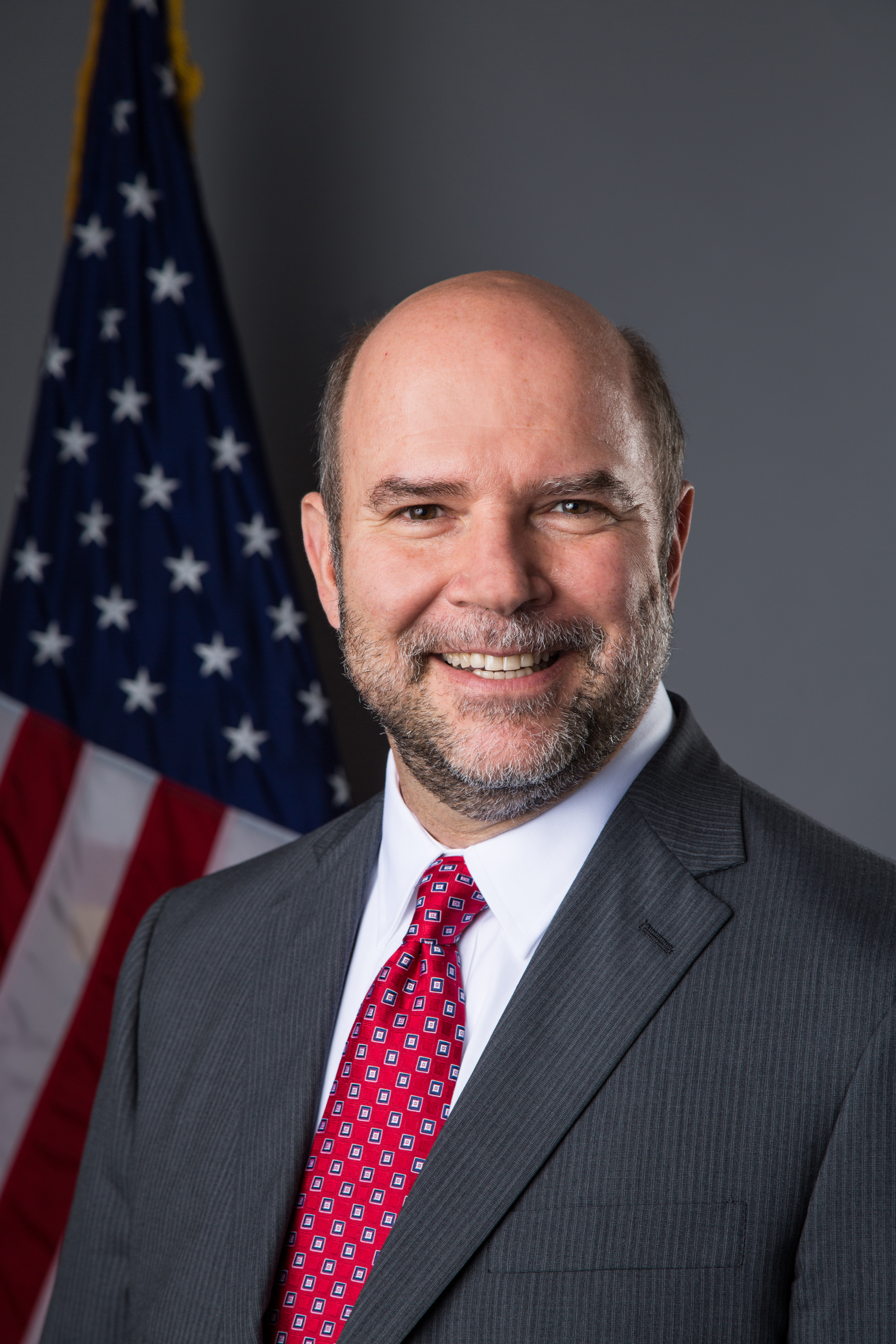

Chairman of the National Labor Relations Board
- In office April 24, 2017 – December 16, 2017; Acting: January 23, 2017 – April 23, 2017
- President: Donald Trump
- Preceded by: Mark Gaston Pearce
- Succeeded by: Marvin Kaplan

Member of the National Labor Relations Board
- In office August 7, 2013 – December 16, 2017
- President: Barack Obama; Donald Trump
- Preceded by: Brian Hayes
- Succeeded by: John F. Ring

Personal details
- Born: March 14, 1956 (age 70) Pittsburgh, Pennsylvania, U.S.
- Party: Republican
- Children: 3
- Education: Duquesne University (BA); University of Pennsylvania (JD, MBA)

Philip Andrew Miscimarra (born March 14, 1956) is a partner in the labor and employment practice of Morgan, Lewis & Bockius LLP, and he is a former American government official who served as the chairman of the National Labor Relations Board (NLRB). He first joined the NLRB as a board member appointed by President Barack Obama in 2013, and he was named chairman by President Donald Trump (after a period as acting chairman) in 2017. Prior to his appointment to the NLRB, he worked as a Morgan Lewis partner in Chicago. After his service on the NLRB ended, Miscimarra joined Morgan Lewis in Washington, D.C., and Chicago. Miscimarra is also a senior fellow in the Wharton Center for human resources at the University of Pennsylvania's Wharton School.

== Early life and education ==
Miscimarra was born on March 14, 1956. He grew up in Pittsburgh, where his father Anthony, the son of Italian immigrants, worked for the city and his mother, Helen (née Venditto), was a member of the school board. Miscimarra himself began work at age 14 first as a caddie, then at a movie theater and at the local Carnegie Library. For many years, he worked as a musician represented by the American Federation of Musicians.

Miscimarra earned a B.A. in English and economics from Duquesne University in 1978, an M.B.A. from the Wharton School of the University of Pennsylvania in 1982, and a J.D. at the University of Pennsylvania Law School in 1982.

== Career ==
Miscimarra started his legal career in Pittsburgh at Reed Smith Shaw & McClay (now Reed Smith LLP) in 1982, moving to Chicago to work for Murphy Smith & Polk (now the Chicago office of Ogletree, Deakins, Nash, Smoak & Stewart, PC) in 1986–1987, before working at Seyfarth Shaw LLP, where he practiced from 1987 to 2005, including as a partner with its labor and employment group. In May 2005, Miscimarra joined the law firm of Morgan, Lewis & Bockius. He remained with Morgan Lewis until President Barack Obama appointed him to the National Labor Relations Board (NLRB) in April 2013. He was confirmed by the Senate in July 2013.

He returned to Morgan Lewis in February 2018 and leads the firm's NLRB special appeals practice. Miscimarra is a senior fellow in the Wharton Business School's Center for Human Resources at the University of Pennsylvania.

Miscimarra was named chair of the National Labor Relations Board (NLRB) by President Donald Trump on April 24, 2017, having served as acting chairman since January 23, 2017. Miscimarra's term as chair expired December 16, 2017. The NLRB now consists of Chairman John F. Ring; Lauren McFerran, whose term ends in December 2019; Marvin Kaplan, whose term ends in August 2020; and William Emanuel, whose term ends in August 2021.

== Publications ==
Miscimarra has authored or co-authored several books concerning labor law issues, including:

- N.L.R.B. and Managerial Discretion: Plant Closings, Relocations, Subcontracting, and Automation (1983); by Philip A. Miscimarra,
- Government Protection of Employees Involved in Mergers and Acquisitions (1989 and 1997 supp.); by Philip A. Miscimarra,
- The NLRB and Secondary Boycotts (3d ed. 2002); by Philip A. Miscimarra,
- Multinational Union Organizations In The White Collar, Service, And Communications Industries (1989), by Richard L. Rowan, Philip A. Miscimarra.

Political offices
Preceded by Brian Hayes	Member of the National Labor Relations Board; 2013–2017	Succeeded by John F. Ring
Preceded by Mark Gaston Pearce	Chairman of the National Labor Relations Board; 2017	Succeeded by Marvin Kaplan
