= Heather MacDougall =

American lawyer

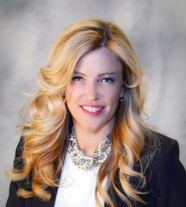

Member of the Occupational Safety and Health Review Commission
- In office April 2, 2014 – April 6, 2019
- President: Barack Obama; Donald Trump
- Succeeded by: Amanda Wood Laihow

Personal details
- Education: University of Wisconsin; Marquette University Law School

Heather MacDougall is an American lawyer and former government official under the Barack Obama administration as well as President Donald Trump's first term presidency. She was also formerly an executive at Amazon, serving as its vice president of worldwide employee health and safety.

== Career ==
MacDougall graduated from the University of Wisconsin and Marquette University Law School.

Early on in her career, MacDougall served as associate general counsel to the HR Policy Association, chief counsel to former OSHRC Chairman W. Scott Railton, and as a labor, employment, and occupational safety and health law attorney at Akerman LLP.

MacDougall was first nominated to the post by President Barack Obama and unanimously confirmed by the U.S. Senate in March 2014.

From 2014 to 2019, she was a member of the Occupational Safety and Health Review Commission (OSHRC). She served as the acting chair of OSHRC from January 2017 until her resignation in March 2019.

In April 2017, President Donald Trump nominated her to continue as a commissioner for a second term. MacDougall was confirmed by the U.S. Senate for an additional term on the OSHRC on August 3, 2017. She resigned from OSHRC in March 2019 in order to join Amazon.
