= David Uhlmann =

American attorney and educator

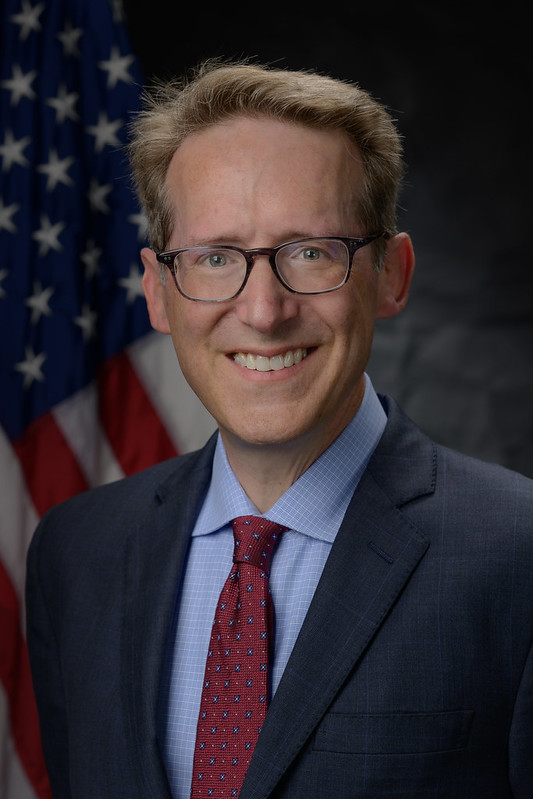

Assistant Administrator of the Environmental Protection Agency for Enforcement and Compliance Assurance
- In office July 27, 2023 – January 20, 2025
- President: Joe Biden
- Preceded by: Susan Bodine

Personal details
- Education: Swarthmore College (BA); Yale University (JD)

David M. Uhlmann is an American educator and attorney who served as the assistant administrator of the Environmental Protection Agency within the Office of Enforcement and Compliance Assurance during the Presidency of Joe Biden. He previously served as a deputy assistant administrator in the same division and as an environmental law professor at the University of Michigan Law School.

== Early life and education ==
Uhlmann received a B.A. in history and political science with high honors from Swarthmore College and earned his Juris Doctor (J.D.) from Yale Law School.

== Career ==
After graduating from law school, Uhlmann clerked for U.S. District Court Judge Marvin Shoob in Atlanta, Georgia.

Uhlmann is known for his expertise in environmental law, as well as his role in law enforcement. Previously, Uhlmann served as a federal prosecutor for 17 years, which involved a stint at the United States Department of Justice. He helped prosecute environmental crimes and oversee the creation of new initiatives. During his tenure, he helped build stronger connections with other law enforcement groups like the United States Coast Guard and Environmental Protection Agency. Uhlmann served as the lead prosecutor in United States v. Elias, which involved a 20-year-old worker severely and permanently brain-damaged.

=== EPA, 2021-2024 ===
On June 22, 2021, President Joe Biden nominated Uhlmann to be an assistant EPA administrator. Hearings on his nomination were held before the United States Senate Committee on Environment and Public Works on September 15, 2021. The committee favorably reported his nomination on December 1, 2021. Uhlmann's nomination expired at the end of the year and was returned to President Biden on January 3, 2022.

President Biden renominated Uhlmann the following day. The Environment and Public Works Committee deadlocked on Uhlmann's nomination on April 7, 2022, in a party-line vote. This occurred at a time when Senate Republicans were blocking several EPA nominees, and environmental law enforcement was not strong. The United States Senate discharged his nomination from the committee on August 6, 2022, by a 51–39 vote. His nomination again expired at the end of the year, and was returned to President Biden on January 3, 2023, who renominated him on January 23, 2023. The committee favorably reported his nomination on April 26, 2023. The Senate confirmed Uhlmann's confirmation for the Office of Enforcement and Compliance Assuranceon July 20, 2023 by a 53–46 vote. Uhlmann left EPA on December 31, 2024 and was very optimistic "The enforcement from the EPA is poised for even greater gains in 2025 and 2026".

== Awards and recognitions ==
Uhlmann has received awards from the Justice Department and EPA.

== Personal life ==
Uhlmann's wife, Virginia Murphy, is also a professor at the University of Michigan. They have three adult children and two grandchildren.
