= Wilma B. Liebman =

American lawyer and civil servant (born 1950)

Wilma Liebman
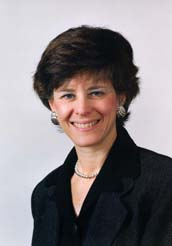
- Born: 1950 (age 75–76); Philadelphia, Pennsylvania, U.S.
- Education: Barnard College (BA); George Washington University Law School (JD)
- Occupation: Attorney
- Known for: Former Chair, National Labor Relations Board

Wilma B. Liebman (born 1950) is an American lawyer and civil servant who is best known for serving as a member of the National Labor Relations Board (NLRB). She was designated chair of the board by President Barack Obama on January 20, 2009, becoming only the second woman to lead the NLRB.

== Early life and career ==
Liebman was born in Philadelphia, Pennsylvania, in 1950. She received a bachelor's degree from Barnard College in 1971, and her J.D. from the George Washington University Law School in 1974.

Immediately upon graduation from law school she was appointed a staff attorney with the National Labor Relations Board, and served with the agency until 1980. She left the NLRB and was a senior attorney representing the International Brotherhood of Teamsters from 1980 to 1989. In 1990, Liebman became general counsel for the International Union of Bricklayers and Allied Craftworkers, a position she held for three years.

== Federal executive service ==
Liebman returned to federal service in 1994, becoming Special Assistant to the Director of the Federal Mediation and Conciliation Service (FMCS). During this time, she served on the Mediator Task Force on the Future of FMCS, a group established to recommend a vision and strategic plan for the FMCS. In 1994, she was appointed to a three-person panel by the National Mediation Board, and helped resolve the 1994–95 Major League Baseball strike in the U.S. and Canada. She was promoted to deputy director of the FMCS in 1995 and served for two years in that position. As deputy director, Liebman oversaw the agency's operations; supervised the heads of the alternative dispute resolution, arbitration, international affairs, and labor-management cooperation grants divisions; and provided expertise and advice to the Director regarding major labor disputes.

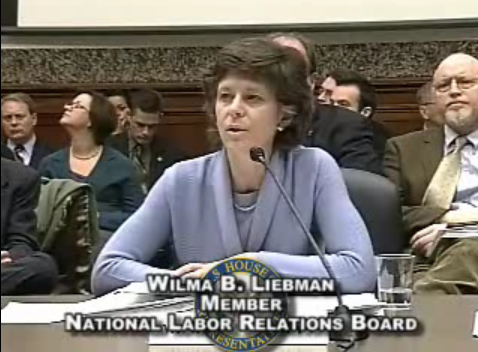
Wilma B. Liebman testifying on December 13, 2007, before the U.S. House of Representatives Committee on Education and Labor.

President Bill Clinton appointed Liebman as a member of the NLRB in October 1997, and the United States Senate confirmed her on November 14. She was reappointed by President George W. Bush in December 2002. President Bush re-appointed her a third time in August 2006 for a term that will expire in August 2011. Liebman often found herself in the minority on the NLRB from 2001 to 2008, as the Republican-appointed majority overruled a number of precedents and made a number of policy decisions that appeared to favor employers. After a November 2007 protest by labor unions in front of the NLRB's headquarters (during which unions demanded the board be abolished), Liebman became even more outspoken, arguing that the board had made "some rather dramatic shifts in [labor] policy ... what this board is doing is giving much more focus to the right to refrain [from union organizing] than the underlying policy goal of encouraging collective bargaining." She was outspoken as a member about what she perceived to be the failings of the Republican majority on the board during her first 10 years in office. "By virtually all measures this law is derelict if not dead," she told a labor law conference in May 2007. She felt that Chair Robert J. Battista had made the "board and the board's decision-making ... much more divisive". She clashed repeatedly with Battista during a hearing before the House Committee on Education and Labor in December 2007, declaring "Virtually every recent policy choice by the board impedes collective bargaining, creates obstacles to union representation or favors employer interests." "Today, fewer workers have fewer rights and weaker remedies under the National Labor Relations Act," she continued. She also accused Battista and other Republican members of the board of "narrowly casting existing precedent" and ignoring precedents "if they stand in the way of a desired result." She portrayed the majority's view of the law as contradictory to prevailing academic opinion. She was particularly critical of the NLRB's recent decision in Dana Corp., 351 NLRB No. 28 (Sept. 29, 2007), which she felt broke precedent extending back to 1960 and under which a "minority [can] undo what a majority has expressed a desire to do."

=== NLRB Chair ===
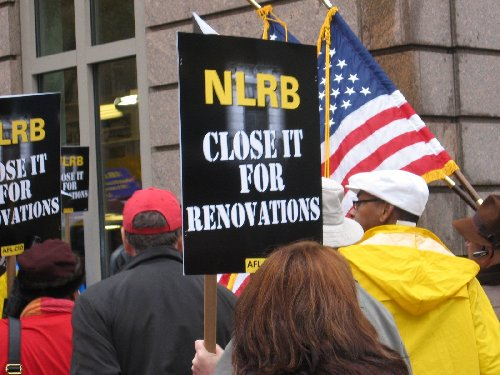
Union members picket outside the NLRB in November 2007, a protest which worried then-member Liebman.

On his first day in office, President Barack Obama designated Liebman to be the NLRB's chair. She was the second woman to hold the position in the board's 78-year history. During her first year as Chair, Liebman confronted a five-member board which only had two members. Upon the expiration of three members' terms in December 2007, the NLRB operated with just two members—Liebman and member Peter Schaumber. President George W. Bush refused to make some nominations to the board and Senate Democrats refused to confirm others. Just before the board lost a quorum, the five members agreed to delegate their authority to a three-person panel (as provided for by the National Labor Relations Act). Only two of the members of the panel (Liebman and Schaumber) would remain on the board, but the board concluded that these two members would constitute a quorum of the panel and thus could make decisions on behalf of the entire board. Liebman and Schaumber informally agreed to decide only those cases which were noncontroversial (in their view), and issued more than 400 decisions between January 2008 and September 2009. In April 2009, President Obama nominated Craig Becker (Associate General Counsel of the Service Employees International Union), Mark Gaston Pearce (a member on the Industrial Board of Appeals, an agency of the New York State Department of Labor), and Brian Hayes (Republican Labor Policy Director for the Senate Committee on Health, Education, Labor and Pensions) to fill the three empty seats on the NLRB. Meanwhile, the 1st Circuit Court of Appeals, 2nd Circuit Court of Appeals, and 7th Circuit Court of Appeals all upheld the two-member rump NLRB's authority to decide cases, while the D.C. Circuit Court of Appeals did not. In September 2009, the Justice Department asked the U.S. Supreme Court to immediately hear arguments concerning the dispute, given the high stakes involved. The Supreme Court granted certiorari in October and agreed to decide the issue. In the spring of 2010, the Supreme Court ruled that the NLRB could have no quorum with just two members, likely invalidating hundreds of previous rulings made by Liebman and Schaumber. Becker's nomination appeared to fail on February 8, 2010, after Republican Senators (led by John McCain) threatened to filibuster his nomination. President Obama said he would consider making recess appointments to the NLRB due to the Senate's failure to move on any of the three nominations. True to his word, Obama on March 27, 2010 recess appointed both Becker and Pearce to the NLRB.

During her tenure as Chair, Liebman called for Congress to update and revise the National Labor Relations Act, which has not undergone any fundamental revisions since 1947. "It is unrealistic to expect fundamental change in labor because we are constrained by the law's statutory text, precedent, the review process and constant turnover of board members," she told a Congressional hearing in September 2009.

Liebman stepped down as chair of the NLRB and as a member of the board when her term expired on August 27, 2011. President Obama named Mark Gaston Pearce as her replacement as chair.

Following her resignation from the NLRB, she became a visiting assistant professor in the School of Labor and Employment Relations at the University of Illinois at Urbana-Champaign.

== Memberships ==
Liebman is a former executive board member of the Industrial Relations Research Association, and a former executive board member of the College of Labor and Employment Lawyers. As of 2022, Liebman sits on the board of the nonprofit Ownership Works.

Political offices
Preceded by Peter Schaumber	Chairperson of the National Labor Relations Board; 2009–2011	Succeeded by Mark Gaston Pearce
