= Lauren McFerran =

American lawyer

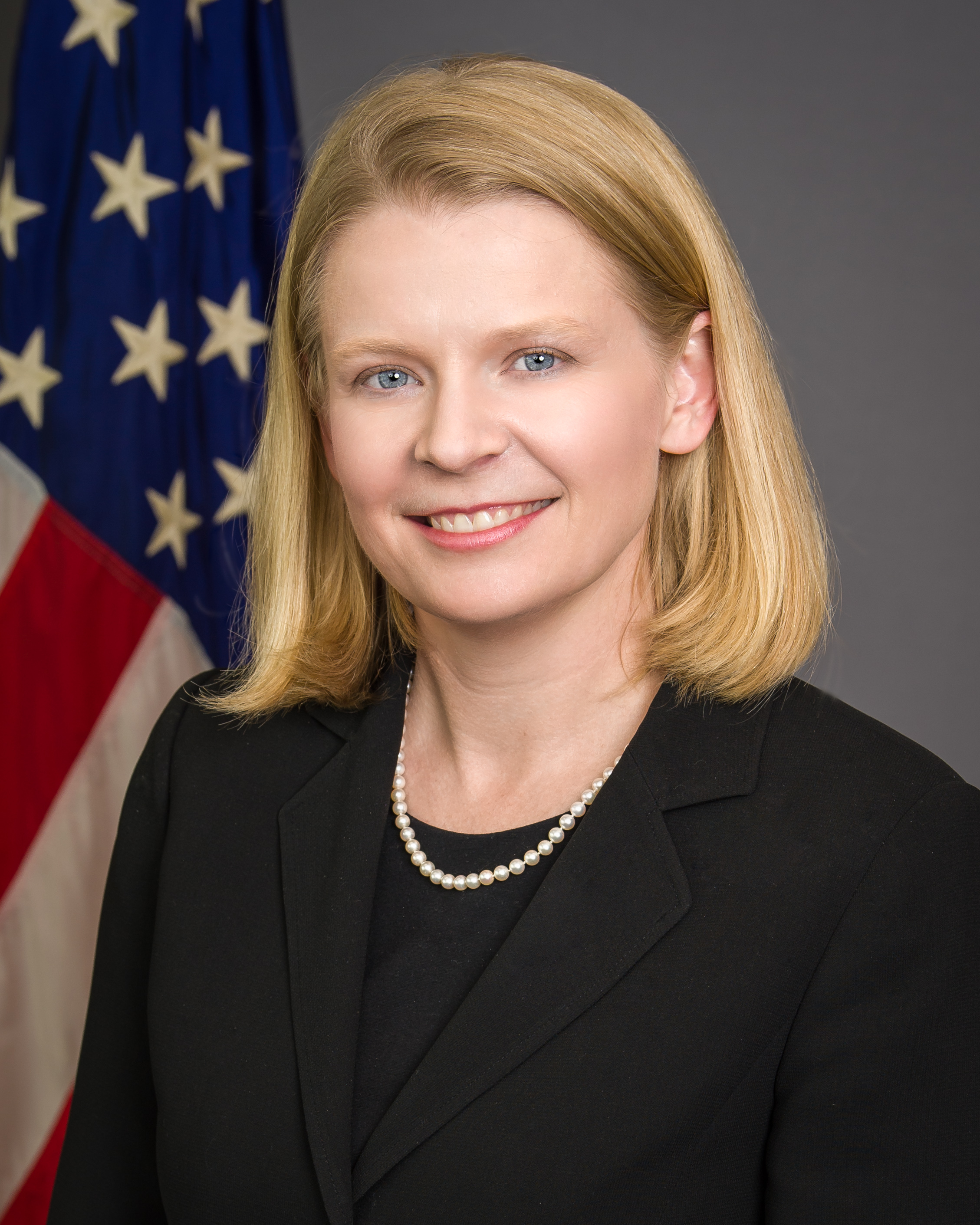

Chair of the National Labor Relations Board
- In office January 20, 2021 – December 16, 2024
- President: Joe Biden
- Preceded by: John F. Ring
- Succeeded by: Gwynne Wilcox

Member of the National Labor Relations Board
- In office July 29, 2020 – December 16, 2024
- President: Donald Trump; Joe Biden
- Preceded by: Herself
- Succeeded by: Scott Mayer
- In office December 16, 2014 – December 16, 2019
- President: Barack Obama; Donald Trump
- Preceded by: Nancy Schiffer
- Succeeded by: Herself

Personal details
- Party: Democratic
- Education: Rice University (BA); Yale University (JD)

Lauren McFerran is an American lawyer and government official who served as a member and chairman of the National Labor Relations Board. Prior to serving on the board, she worked as a law clerk, in private practice, and as a labor lawyer for the Senate Committee on Health, Education, Labor, and Pensions (HELP Committee).

== Biography ==
McFerran received her Bachelor of Arts from Rice University and her Juris Doctor from Yale Law School. From 2001 to 2002, McFerran served as a law clerk for Chief Judge Carolyn Dineen King on the Court of Appeals for the Fifth Circuit. From 2002 to 2005, she was an associate attorney at the law firm Bredhoff & Kaiser. She then served in multiple roles as a staff member for the HELP Committee in the U.S. Senate, including as senior labor counsel for committee member Senators Ted Kennedy and Tom Harkin from 2005 to 2010, as chief labor counsel for the committee from 2010 to 2014, and as deputy staff director from 2012 to 2014.

In November 2014, President Barack Obama nominated McFerran to the National Labor Relations Board to fill a seat previously held by Nancy F. Schiffer. Obama had initially sought to appoint Sharon Block, who had served on the board under a recess appointment, but withdrew her nomination due to Republican opposition. He nominated McFerran instead, who was confirmed and began her term on December 17, 2014.

McFerran's initial term expired on December 16, 2019, after which no Democrats were left on the board. After her term expired, the remaining Republican members on the board released a flurry of decisions favorable to management. In March 2020, President Donald Trump announced that he would re-nominate both McFerran and Marvin Kaplan, whose term was due to expire in August 2020, to the board. Both were confirmed, and McFerran began a second term on the board on July 29, 2020.

On January 20, 2021, incoming president Joe Biden announced McFerran would be the new chairman of the board, replacing John F. Ring.

Political offices
Preceded by Nancy J. Schiffer	Member of the National Labor Relations Board; 2014-2019, 2020-2024	Vacant
Preceded by John F. Ring	Chairman of the National Labor Relations Board; 2021-2024	Succeeded by Gwynne Wilcox
