= Gwynne Wilcox =

American attorney

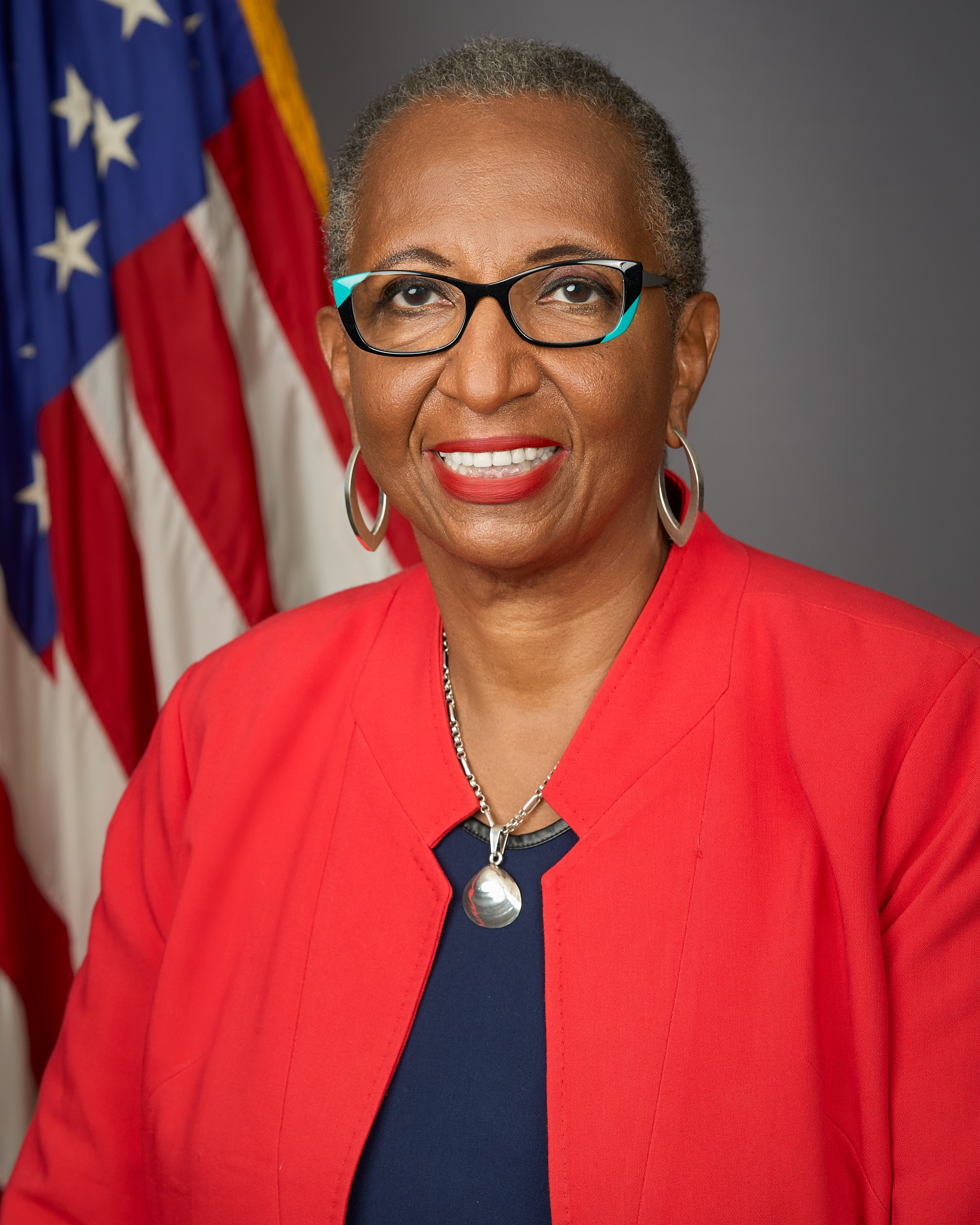

Chair of the National Labor Relations Board
- In office December 17, 2024 – January 20, 2025
- President: Joe Biden
- Preceded by: Lauren McFerran
- Succeeded by: Marvin Kaplan

Member of the National Labor Relations Board
- In office September 11, 2023 – January 27, 2025
- President: Joe Biden; Donald Trump
- Preceded by: Herself
- In office August 4, 2021 – August 27, 2023
- President: Joe Biden
- Preceded by: Mark Gaston Pearce
- Succeeded by: Herself

Personal details
- Party: Democratic
- Education: Syracuse University (BA); Rutgers University, Newark (JD)

Gwynne A. Wilcox is an American attorney who has served on the National Labor Relations Board (NLRB).

== Early life and education ==
Wilcox obtained a Bachelor of Arts from Syracuse University and a Juris Doctor from the Rutgers Law School.

== Career ==
Wilcox is a fellow of the College of Labor and Employment Lawyers. She is also a member of the Labor and Employment Law sections of both the American Bar Association and New York State Bar Association. She is a partner at Levy Ratner, P.C, an employment law firm that deals with unions. Part of Wilcox's work is to represent unions before the NLRB.

=== NLRB ===
On May 26, 2021, President Joe Biden nominated Wilcox to be a member of the National Labor Relations Board (NLRB). The Senate HELP Committee held hearings on her nomination on July 15, 2021. On July 21, 2021, the committee favorably reported her nomination to the Senate floor. Wilcox was confirmed by the entire Senate on July 28, 2021, by a roll call vote of 52–47. She was sworn into her position on August 4, 2021. With the appointment, Wilcox became the first Black woman to be a member of the NLRB.

On June 2, 2023, President Biden nominated Wilcox for a second term on the board. Her nomination was favorably reported by the Senate's HELP committee on July 12, 2023, and confirmed by the full Senate on September 6, 2023. Her seat was briefly vacant as her initial term expired on August 27, 2023. She was designated chair in December 2024 after the term of former chair Lauren McFerran expired.

== Dismissal by Donald Trump ==
Wilcox v. Trump
- Court: District Court for the District of Columbia
- Started: February 5, 2025
- Docket nos.: 1:25-cv-00334 (D.D.C); 25-5037, 25-5057 (D.C. Cir.); 24A966, 25A1164 (SCOTUS)

Case history
- Appealed to: District of Columbia Circuit
- Subsequent actions: district ruling stayed by supreme court via shadow docket; overturned by D.C. Circuit, reappealled to supreme court

Court membership
- Judge sitting: Beryl Howell

President Donald Trump dismissed Wilcox from the NLRB on January 27, 2025, though her term was supposed to last into August 2028. Trump's firing of Wilcox and Jennifer Abruzzo is reported to have paralyzed the Board, which now lacks the three-member quorum it needs to decide cases that come before it.

The US Supreme Court holding Morrison v. Olson states that Congress provides tenure protections to certain inferior officers with narrowly defined duties, like the NLRB, from being fired except for cause. Her spokesperson said her firing violated "long-standing Supreme Court precedent" and that she would take "legal avenues" to challenge her removal. Wilcox's firing also explicitly contradicted a federal statute which provides that members of the NLRB "may be removed by the President, upon notice and hearing, for neglect of duty or malfeasance in office, but for no other cause." On February 5, Wilcox filed suit against Trump and NLRB chair Marvin Kaplan in the US District Court for the District of Columbia. On March 6, Judge Beryl Howell ruled that Trump's action violated the National Labor Relations Act, and that Wilcox "remains a member of the National Labor Relations Board". However, on March 28, a three-judge panel of the U.S. Court of Appeals for the D.C. Circuit ruled that the termination could take effect while the lawsuit proceeded.

On April 7, the full Court of Appeals for the D.C. Circuit voted 7-4 to once again block the termination. However, on April 9, in response to an emergency appeal from the Trump Administration, Chief Justice John Roberts of the United States Supreme Court issued a stay on that decision.

On December 5th, the D.C. Circuit decided to reverse the District Court's decision. After a motion for en banc rehearing was denied, the case was once again appealed to the Supreme Court, this time by Wilcox, who requested certiatori.

On October 19th, 2026, the Supreme Court declined to take up the case, putting an end to Ms. Wilcox 's challenge.

== Awards and honors ==
Wilcox is the recipient of Syracuse University's Chancellor's Citation for Distinguished Achievement. She has also won the Peggy Browning Fund's Lifetime Achievement Award.

== See also ==
- Political appointments by Joe Biden
