= John F. Ring =

American lawyer

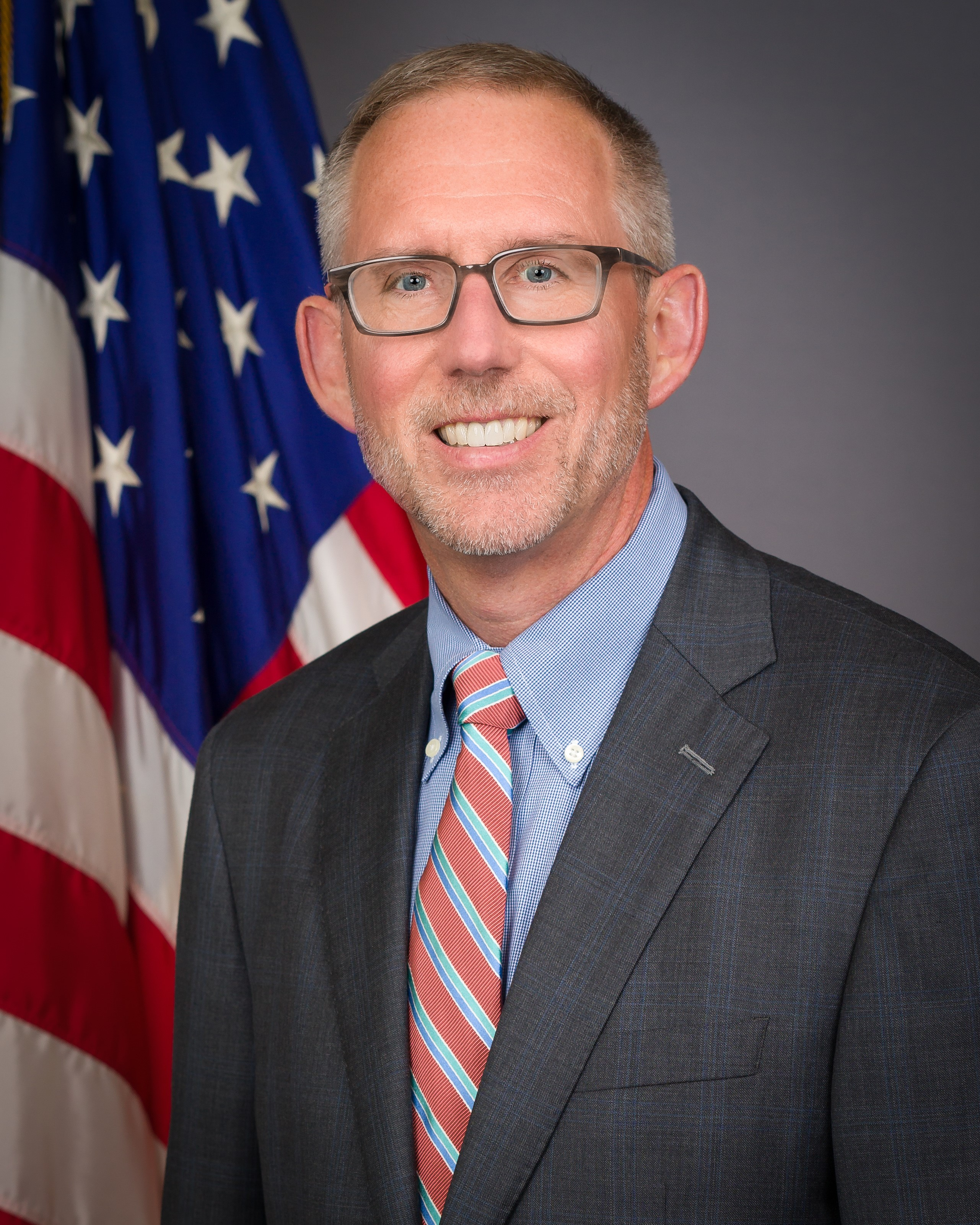

Chairman of the National Labor Relations Board
- In office April 16, 2018 – January 20, 2021
- President: Donald Trump
- Preceded by: Marvin Kaplan
- Succeeded by: Lauren McFerran

Member of the National Labor Relations Board
- In office April 16, 2018 – December 16, 2022
- President: Donald Trump
- Preceded by: Philip A. Miscimarra
- Succeeded by: James Murphy

Personal details
- Party: Republican
- Education: Catholic University of America (BA, JD)

John Francis Ring is a corporate lawyer and a former United States government official. He was a member of the National Labor Relations Board from 2018 to 2022, and was its chair from 2018 to 2021. He was formerly co-chair of the labor and employment law practice at Morgan, Lewis & Bockius, a pro-management law firm, where his practice included representing employers in collective bargaining, labor contracts, multi-employer benefit funds and corporate restructurings.

== Biography ==
Ring received his Bachelor of Arts and Juris Doctor degrees from the Catholic University of America. He spent his whole career at Morgan, Lewis & Bockius, starting as an associate in 1988 and becoming a partner in 1999. He managed the firm's labor and management relations practice defending corporate interests in union environments. He has represented employers in unfair labor practice proceedings before the NLRB and was counsel to the National Master Freight Agreement.

According to Bloomberg BNA, "President Donald Trump's appointees will control the National Labor Relations Board in 2018, and observers expect major changes in the agency’s philosophy and direction." According to The National Law Journal, "If confirmed, Ring would help the NLRB overturn policies criticized by the business community during the Obama administration." Ring's nomination was confirmed on April 11, 2018, by a vote of 50–48. He was sworn in on April 16, 2018, and held the post until December 16, 2022, when his term ended.

== See also ==
- William Emanuel
- Marvin Kaplan
- Peter B. Robb

Political offices
Preceded by Philip A. Miscimarra	Member of the National Labor Relations Board; 2018–2022	Vacant
Preceded by Marvin Kaplan	Chairman of the National Labor Relations Board; 2018–2021	Succeeded by Lauren McFerran
