= David Prouty =

American attorney

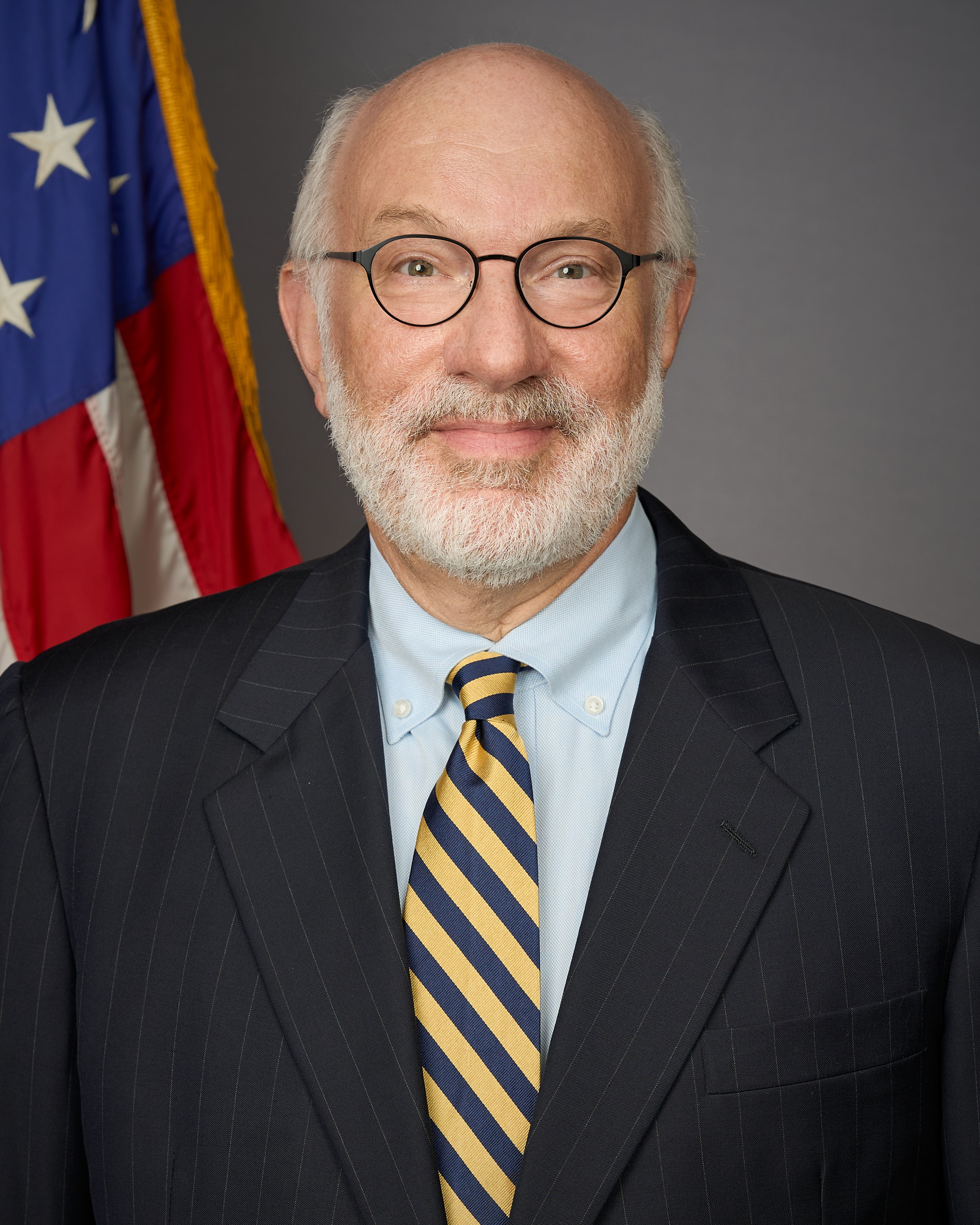

Member of the National Labor Relations Board
- Incumbent
- Assumed office August 28, 2021
- President: Joe Biden; Donald Trump
- Preceded by: William Emanuel

Personal details
- Party: Democratic
- Education: Bowdoin College (BA); Harvard University (JD)

David M. Prouty is an American attorney currently serving as a member of the National Labor Relations Board since August 2021.

== Early life and education ==
Prouty graduated from Walter Johnson High School in 1976. He received his AB (magna cum laude) from Bowdoin College in 1980 and received his JD (cum laude) from Harvard Law School in 1986.

== Career ==
Prouty worked as a researcher and organizer for the American Federation of State, County, and Municipal Employees (AFSCME) from 1980 to 1983.

Prouty was general counsel of Service Employee International Union (SEIU) Local 32BJ. He served as General Counsel of the Major League Baseball Players Association (MLBPA) from 2013 to 2017. His prior affiliation with the league was Chief Labor Counsel of the MLBPA, from 2008 to 2013.

Prior to June 2008, Prouty served as General Counsel for UNITE HERE, a union resulting from a 2004 merger of UNITE (the Union of Needletrades, Industrial and Textile Employees) and HERE (the Hotel Employees and Restaurant Employees International Union); he served as General Counsel of UNITE from 2001 until that merger.

For fifteen years, Prouty served as Southern Regional Counsel for UNITE and its predecessor union, the Amalgamated Clothing and Textile Workers Union (ACTWU). He litigated many of the union's landmark organizing cases including Fieldcrest Cannon, S. Lichtenberg, Tultex, and Kmart.

Prouty is a Fellow of the College of Labor and Employment Lawyers. He served as Union Co-chair of the American Bar Association's Committee on Practice and Procedure Under the National Labor Relations Act from 2007 to 2010. He was a member of the National Labor Relations Board's Union Advisory Panel from 1997 to 1998 and is a member of the Peggy Browning Fund's advisory board.

=== NLRB nomination ===
On June 22, 2021, President Joe Biden nominated Prouty to be a member of the National Labor Relations Board. Hearings were held before the Senate HELP Committee on July 15, 2021. The committee favorably reported his nomination to the Senate floor on July 21, 2021. Prouty was confirmed by the entire Senate on July 28, 2021, by a vote of 53–46.

Prouty began his term on August 28, 2021.
