= Susan Bodine =

American lawyer and government official

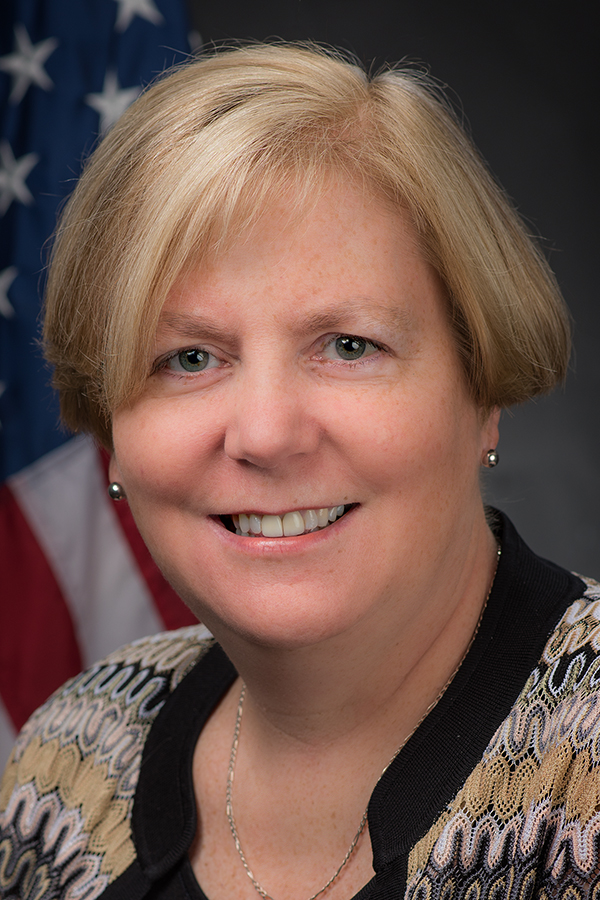
- Official portrait, 2018

Assistant Administrator of the Environmental Protection Agency for Enforcement and Compliance Assurance
- In office January 5, 2018 – January 20, 2021
- President: Donald Trump
- Preceded by: Cynthia Giles
- Succeeded by: David Uhlmann

Personal details
- Born: Susan Parker
- Education: Princeton University (BA); University of Pennsylvania (JD)

Susan Parker Bodine is an American lawyer and government official who served as the Assistant Administrator for Enforcement and Compliance Assurance at the Environmental Protection Agency. She also previously served as chief counsel for the United States Senate Committee on Environment and Public Works. She was appointed in 2017 and left the agency in 2021.

Bodine also previously served as Assistant Administrator of the Environmental Protection Agency's Office of Solid Waste and Emergency Response during the administration of George W. Bush. She has also served as staff director and counsel for the United States House Transportation Subcommittee on Water Resources and Environment, as an associate at Covington & Burling, and as a partner at Barnes & Thornburg.

In 2021 Bodine became a partner at the law and lobbying firm Earth & Water Law, which represents corporations in pollution cases.
