= Mark Gaston Pearce =

American lawyer

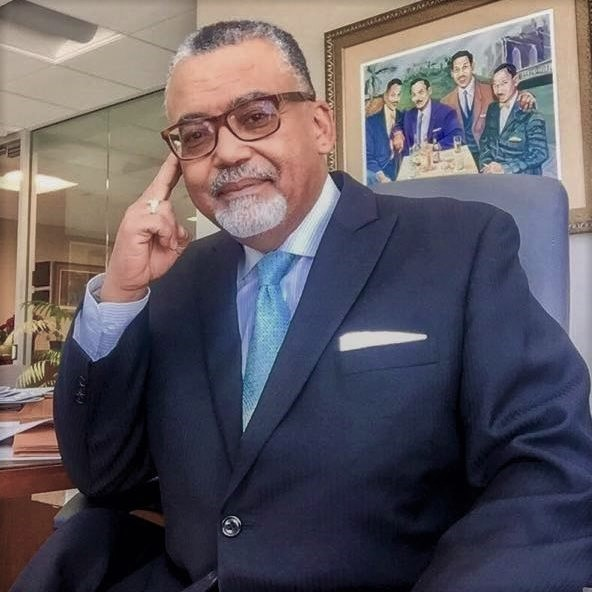

Member of the National Labor Relations Board
- In office April 7, 2010 – August 27, 2018
- President: Barack Obama; Donald Trump
- Succeeded by: Gwynne Wilcox

Chairman of the National Labor Relations Board
- In office August 28, 2011 – January 22, 2017
- President: Barack Obama; Donald Trump
- Preceded by: Wilma B. Liebman
- Succeeded by: Philip A. Miscimarra

Personal details
- Born: Brooklyn, New York
- Party: Democratic
- Education: Cornell University; University at Buffalo Law School

Mark Gaston Pearce is an American lawyer, arbitrator and university professor who is best known for serving as a member of the National Labor Relations Board (NLRB). Pearce was designated chairman of the board by President Barack Obama on August 28, 2011, and served as chairman until January 22, 2017. He currently is a visiting professor and the executive director of the Workers' Rights Institute at Georgetown University Law Center.

== Early life and career ==
Pearce was born in Brooklyn, New York, the son of Jamaican and Cuban immigrants. He attended and later graduated from Erasmus Hall High School in 1971. Pearce received a bachelor's degree in government from Cornell University in 1975 and a Juris Doctor from the University at Buffalo Law School in 1978.

Following his graduation from University at Buffalo, Pearce was admitted to the New York Bar in 1979 and began his career at the NLRB as an attorney, and later as district trial specialist in the board's regional Buffalo office. He remained with the NLRB until 1994, after which he left for private practice, cofounding the firm Creighton, Pearce, Johnsen & Giroux. Pearce then served by appointment of the governor of New York State to the New York State Industrial Board of Appeals, as well as on several state committees and commissions. He also was a certified mediator for the United States District Court for the Western District of New York. On August 23, 2021 Pearce was designated by President Biden to serve as a panel member on the Federal Labor Relations Authority Federal Service Impasse Panel. He is currently a member of the National Academy of Arbitrators and is a panel arbitrator for the American Arbitration Association and the Federal Mediation and Conciliation Service. In 2022 Pearce was honored by the Peggy Browning Fund for his achievements on behalf of workers. Previously he received special recognition from the Lawyers Coordinating Committee of the AFL–CIO; was placed on the Honor Roll of the National Employment Law Project (NELP) and was bestowed the Leadership Award from the Western New York Council on Occupational Safety and Health.

== NLRB tenure ==
President Barack Obama appointed Pearce as a Member of the NLRB on April 7, 2010, and he was confirmed by the United States Senate on June 22, 2010. Obama initially sent his nomination of Pearce to the United States Senate alongside his nomination of Craig Becker in July 2009. The appointment was opposed by Senate Republicans and the United States Chamber of Commerce delaying a Senate confirmation vote on Pearce and Craig. Obama eventually nominated Pearce and Craig by recess appointment.

=== Term as NLRB chairman ===
Pearce was named chairman of the NLRB on August 27, 2011. Like the NLRB's legacy during the Obama years as a whole, Pearce's tenure as NLRB chairman has been characterized by business groups as favorable to labor unions. During Pearce's tenure as chairman, the board had to address social media policies, joint-employer business models and “nontraditional” employment models as new areas of focus for the agency. The board had to consider how “nontraditional” employment models have changed the board’s focus in recent years. In an October 2016 speech at Cornell University's Law School, Pearce observed that the rise in the number of temporary workers and staffing agencies, as well as franchises, subsidiaries and other business types has caused the NLRB's job to increasingly become twofold. “It’s not enough that we must be cognizant of [the employer’s] profile,” he said. “Under today’s business model, we’re asked to determine employment relationship. Not only do we have to figure out who the employee is, we have to figure out who’s their employer.” Pearce was among the board majority in the NLRB case Browning-Ferris Industries of California Inc. responsible for expanding the definition of joint employer to include employers who, through reserve and indirect means, share or co-determine the essential terms and conditions of employment of statutory employees.

=== Life after the NLRB ===
In April 2024 Pearce was featured in the ABA Journal as one of the organization's "Members who Inspire". The article displayed several of Pearce's labor oriented oil paintings and described how he uses art and law to draw attention to workers' rights.

== Personal life ==
In addition to his legal career, Pearce is an oil painter. He formerly served on the board of directors of Buffalo Arts Studio and the advisory council of the Burchfield Penney Art Center and has exhibited at several venues throughout the years, including Images of Us By Us, Burchfield Penney Art Center, March – April 2018 (contributing artist); Art Expo and opening of the Buffalo Museum of Science's Lillian P. Benbow Visual Arts Gallery, April 2016 (contributing artist); Buffalo Arts Council Hope & Honor, New Paintings by Mark Pearce, February – March 2002 (solo exhibition); Making the Connection – Collaboration of the WNY Martin Luther King Jr. Commission, the Theodore Roosevelt Inaugural Site and The Burchfield Penney Art Center – January 1999 (contributing artist); Exhibition of Local African-American Artists; Ikenga Gallery, 1993 (contributing artist).

Preceded by Wilma B. Liebman	Chairman of the National Labor Relations Board; 2011–2017	Succeeded by Philip A. Miscimarra
