= J. Steven Dowd =

American businessman

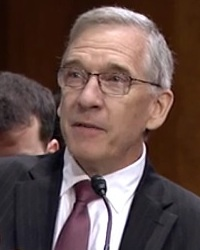

United States Director of the European Bank for Reconstruction and Development
- In office September 2020 – 2021
- President: Donald Trump

United States Director of the African Development Bank
- In office October 2017 – September 2020
- President: Donald Trump

Personal details
- Born: Joseph Steven Dowd New York, USA
- Education: Manhattan College; Georgetown University

Joseph Steven Dowd is an American businessman who served as the United States Director of the European Bank for Reconstruction and Development (EBRD). Prior to assuming his EBRD role, he was United States Director of the African Development Bank. Previous to his government service, Dowd co-founded Ag Source, LLC, a global logistics, trading, and finance company. He has overseen food aid operations and port infrastructure projects, and was CEO of Marcona Ocean Industries, an international shipping and mining company.

Dowd was nominated by the President of the United States as United States Executive Director of the European Bank for Reconstruction and Development. He was confirmed for EBRD by the United States Senate in July 2020. Dowd is currently engaged in infrastructure development, education and finance in developing markets.
