= Susan McCue =

American politician

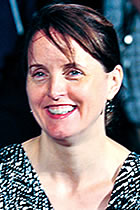

Member of the Broadcasting Board of Governors
- In office July 2, 2010 – May 22, 2014
- Appointed by: Barack Obama
- Preceded by: Joaquin F. Blaya
- Succeeded by: Vacant

Personal details
- Party: Democratic Party
- Education: Rutgers University in New Brunswick, New Jersey, Economics and Journalism

Susan McCue was appointed to the Broadcasting Board of Governors on July 2, 2010, to a term expiring on August 13, 2011, and continued serving until May 22, 2014. By law, any member whose term has expired may serve until a successor has been appointed and qualified. McCue was co-chair of the Communications and Outreach Committee, of the BBG, chair of its subcommittee on innovation and was a member of the Governance Committee. After leaving the BBG, she joined the board of directors of the Millennium Challenge Corporation, an independent federal agency.

== Career ==
Susan McCue is president of Message Global, a strategic advocacy firm she founded in 2008 for social action campaigns. She was the founding president and CEO of The ONE Campaign to combat extreme global poverty and was chief of Staff to Senate Majority Leader Harry Reid from 1999 to 2007. Before that she held numerous communications positions in government and campaigns. She is currently Vice Chair of Humanity United and a member of the Council on Foreign Relations.

A New Jersey native, McCue is a graduate of Rutgers University in New Brunswick, New Jersey, with degrees in economics and journalism.
