= Phyllis Kaminsky =

American political consultant

Phyllis Kaminsky (born 1936/1937) is an American public relations and political consultant. She served as press secretary for the national security adviser, Richard V. Allen, before working as a press liaison to the National Security Council and as the director of the office of public liaison for the United States Information Agency. She was the first American to work as director of the United Nations Information Center Washington.

== Early life ==
Kaminsky was born in 1936 or 1937 in Montreal, Quebec and raised in Long Island City, New York City. She received a bachelors of arts degree from the University of Michigan and attended graduate school at Columbia University. She is married to Samuel Kaminsky, a lawyer in Johnstown, Pennsylvania. The couple have one son, Glenn, and she has one son, David, from a previous marriage.

== Career ==
Kaminsky worked for mayor John Lindsay as a liaison to the consular corps and was in public relations for the Société des bains de mer de Monaco, a company that runs casinos, hotels, and night clubs. In January 1980, she created the Jerusalem Women's Seminar with Elaine Dubow. She worked as the deputy director of communications for the Reagan-Bush Committee in Arlington, Virginia, for the 1980 presidential campaign. Following the election, she served as press secretary for national security adviser, Richard V. Allen, during the presidential transition. She joined the International Communication Agency in February 1981 as a special assistant to the associate director for programs, before being assigned as a press liaison to the National Security Council in 1981. Later in the same year, Kaminsky became the director of the office of public liaison for the United States Information Agency. She was a spokeswoman for Voice of America, a government-owned radio station, between 1982 and 1983.

In May 1983, she was appointed to replace Marcel Tamayo as director of the United Nations Information Center Washington. She was the first American to hold this position. In this role, she helped to promote the United Nations to the U.S. presidential administration and Congress. She worked on the United Nations Decade for Women conference in Nairobi, Kenya, in 1985. She criticized the stance of the World Conference on Women, 1975 to denounce Zionism, which culminated in United Nations General Assembly Resolution 3379. She held this position until 1988.

She was the president and chief executive of the KRV International Group. In 1989, she founded the private consulting company Kaminsky Associates, where she worked primarily with Lockheed Martin and General Dynamics. She was appointed to the board of directors of Select Appointments (Holdings) PLC, the only woman and American to hold the position. She served as a U.S. delegate to the Human Rights Commission. She was appointed to the Commission for the Preservation of America's Heritage Abroad by both President Bill Clinton and President George W. Bush. She was a member of the National Council for the Humanities, having been appointed by President Donald Trump in 2019.

== Personal life ==
She is a self-described Reaganite. Her papers are held by the Ronald Reagan Presidential Library.
