= Marvin Kaplan (lawyer) =

American lawyer

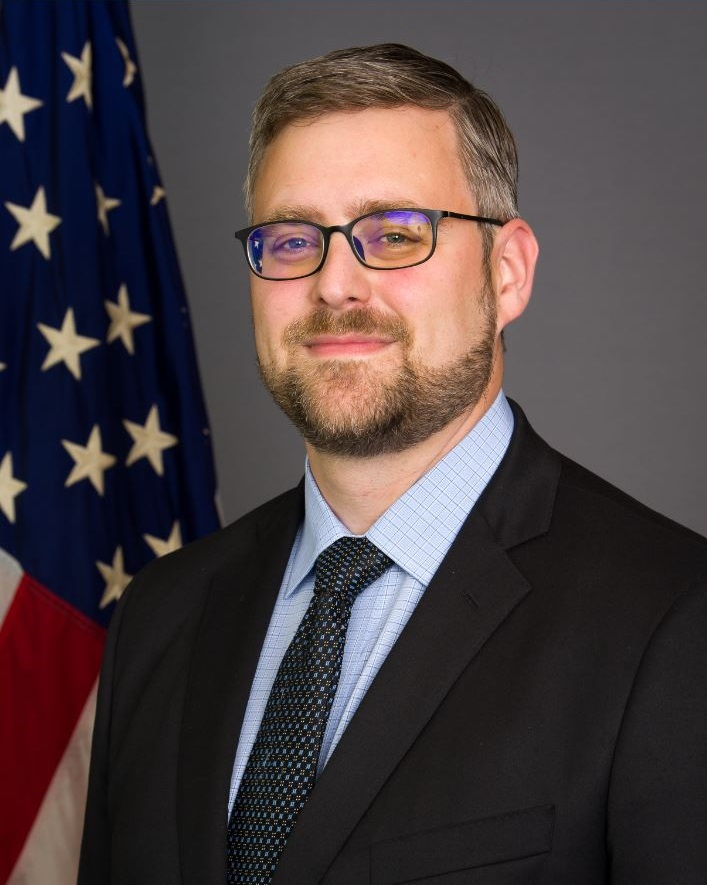
- Official portrait, 2017

Chairman of the National Labor Relations Board
- In office January 20, 2025 – August 27, 2025
- President: Donald Trump
- Preceded by: Gwynne Wilcox
- Succeeded by: James Murphy
- In office December 21, 2017 – April 15, 2018
- President: Donald Trump
- Preceded by: Philip A. Miscimarra
- Succeeded by: John F. Ring

Member of the National Labor Relations Board
- In office August 10, 2017 – August 27, 2025
- President: Donald Trump
- Preceded by: Harry Johnson
- Succeeded by: James Macy

Personal details
- Born: Marvin Elliot Kaplan
- Party: Republican
- Education: Cornell University (BS); Washington University in St. Louis (JD)

Marvin Elliot Kaplan is an American lawyer and government official who is a former member and chairman of the National Labor Relations Board. Prior to assuming his role at the NLRB, he was the chief counsel of the Occupational Safety and Health Review Commission. In June 2017, President Donald Trump nominated Kaplan to be a member of the NLRB for a term expiring on August 27, 2020. He was confirmed by the Senate on August 2, 2017, by a vote of 50–48. On March 2, 2020, President Donald J. Trump announced that he would renominate Kaplan for a second five-year term expiring on August 27, 2025. On July 29, 2020, Kaplan was confirmed by the Senate by a vote of 52–46, thereby keeping the NLRB in solid Republican control.

== Biography ==
Kaplan received his Bachelor of Science from Cornell University and his Juris Doctor from Washington University School of Law. After practicing law in Cresskill, New Jersey and later with the Kansas City, Missouri law firm McDowell Rice Smith & Buchanan, he began his career as special assistant in the United States Department of Labor's Office of Labor-Management and Standards. He has also served as counsel to the United States House Committee on Oversight and Government Reform and to the United States House Committee on Education and the Workforce.

Kaplan served as chief counsel of the Occupational Safety and Health Review Commission. He was nominated by President Donald Trump to be a member of the National Labor Relations Board for a term expiring on August 27, 2020. Kaplan's nomination, which was approved by the U.S. Senate on August 2, 2017, was supported by a number of business groups and anti-union advocates.

According to The National Law Review, the National Labor Relations Board is "likely to consider a number of significant legal issues once the vacancies are filled, including the NLRB's test for determining whether joint employer relationships exist, the standards for evaluating whether handbooks and work rules interfere with employees' rights under the National Labor Relations Act (NLRA), appropriate units for collective bargaining, the question of whether graduate students and research assistants are employees under the NLRA with the right to collective bargaining and a host of other decisions from the past eight years that more expansively interpreted the NLRA."

Political offices
Preceded by Harry I. Johnson III	Member of the National Labor Relations Board; 2017–2025	Vacant
Preceded by Philip A. Miscimarra	Chairman of the National Labor Relations Board; 2017–2018	Succeeded by John F. Ring
Preceded by Gwynne Wilcox	Chairman of the National Labor Relations Board; 2025	Vacant
