= James J. Sullivan =

American lawyer

James J. Sullivan Jr.
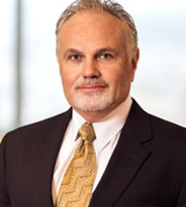

Member of the Occupational Safety and Health Review Commission
- In office August 28, 2017 – March 23, 2021
- President: Donald Trump
- Succeeded by: Vacant

Personal details
- Education: Pennsylvania State University; Georgetown Law School

James J. Sullivan Jr. is an American lawyer specializing in occupational safety and health law at the law firm of Cozen O'Connor. He previously was a member of the Occupational Safety and Health Review Commission, from August 28, 2017 through March 23, 2021. Sullivan served as chairman of the Commission from July 22, 2019 through January 25, 2021. Before joining government, Sullivan was in private practice, representing employers and businesses at law firms, including Cozen O'Connor and Buchanan, Ingersoll & Rooney. He was the management co-chair of the Occupational Safety and Health Law Committee of the American Bar Association's Labor Law Section from 2014 to 2017. Sullivan was the vice president of labor and employment law and deputy general counsel for Comcast from 2000 to 2002.
