= Office of Enforcement and Compliance Assurance =

Law enforcement arm of the United States Environmental Protection Agency

U.S. Environmental Protection Agency, Office of Enforcement and Compliance Assurance
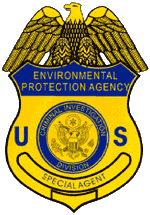
- EPA CID Special Agent badge
- Abbreviation: OECA

Jurisdictional structure
- Federal agency: USA
- Operations jurisdiction: USA
- General nature: Federal law enforcement

Operational structure
- Headquarters: William Jefferson Clinton Federal Building; Washington, D.C., U.S.
- Agency executives: David Uhlmann, Assistant Administrator; Lawrence Starfield, Principal Deputy Assistant Administrator
- Parent agency: U.S. Environmental Protection Agency

Website
- https://www.epa.gov/enforcement

The Office of Enforcement and Compliance Assurance is the law enforcement arm of the United States Environmental Protection Agency (EPA). It is made up of attorneys, special agents, scientists and other employees.

== Organization ==
The Office of Enforcement and Compliance Assurance consists of eight component offices.

=== Office of Administration and Policy ===
The Office of Administration and Policy recommends national policy on issues pertaining to enforcement and compliance, and provides a range of administrative support services which includes: human resources, labor relations, budget, finances, contracts, grants, records management and management of the compliance and enforcement information on the Agency's website.

- Administrative Management Division
- Budget and Financial Management Division
- Information Technology Division
- Policy and Legislative Coordination Division

=== Office of Civil Enforcement ===
The Office of Civil Enforcement develops and prosecutes administrative civil and judicial cases and provides legal support for cases and investigations initiated in EPA regional offices. It implements and enforces federal programs (i.e., those programs where there are no EPA-authorized state programs), and has responsibility for planning and setting priorities for enforcement activities, developing national enforcement policy and guidance, participating in Agency rule-making to ensure that regulations contain clear and enforceable provisions, and implementing effective communication to alert regulated entities to potential compliance problems.

- Air Enforcement Division (enforces the Clean Air Act)
- Special Litigation and Projects Division
- Waste and Chemical Enforcement Division (Resource Conservation and Recovery Act); Toxic Substances Control Act; Federal Insecticide, Fungicide, and Rodenticide Act; Emergency Planning and Community Right-to-Know Act)
- Water Enforcement Division (Clean Water Act; Safe Drinking Water Act)

Federal judicial actions (formal lawsuits) are filed by the U.S. Department of Justice on behalf of EPA.

=== Office of Criminal Enforcement, Forensics and Training ===
The Office of Criminal Enforcement, Forensics and Training investigates alleged environmental crimes and provides a range of technical and forensic services for civil and criminal investigative support and counsel on legal and policy matters.

- Criminal Investigation Division
- National Enforcement Investigations Center
- Legal Counsel Division

==== CID Mission ====
The primary mission of the Criminal Investigation Division is to investigate the most significant and egregious violations of environmental laws which pose significant threats to human health and the environment. Frequently, the investigations of environmental crimes will uncover other types of crimes, such as lying to the government, fraud or conspiracy. These crimes could also be prosecuted. Attorney General of the United States. These environmental laws include those specifically related to air, water and land resources.

==== CID training ====
CID special agents receive twelve weeks of basic federal law enforcement and Criminal Investigator training at the Federal Law Enforcement Training Center located in Glynco, Georgia. In addition to the Basic Law Enforcement Training, CID special agents also receive nine weeks of training in conducting criminal investigations of U.S. environmental laws. There is also periodic in-service training, as well as advanced training in various investigative techniques.

=== Office of Compliance ===
The Office of Compliance identifies, prevents, and reduces noncompliance and environmental risks by establishing enforcement initiatives and ensuring effective monitoring and assessment of compliance. OC provides compliance assistance and compliance data and ensures the effectiveness of compliance and enforcement personnel through training.

- Enforcement Targeting and Data Division
- Monitoring, Assistance, and Media Programs Division
- National Enforcement Training Institute
- Planning, Measuring, and Oversight Division
- Resource Management Staff

=== Office of Environmental Justice ===
The Office of Environmental Justice works to protect human health and the environment in communities with environmental pollution by integrating environmental justice into EPA programs, policies and activities.

=== Office of Federal Activities ===
The Office of Federal Activities (OFA) coordinates EPA's review of all federal Environmental Impact Statements prepared by other agencies under the National Environmental Policy Act (NEPA), as well as EPA's compliance with NEPA. OFA also works with federal and state agencies, foreign governments and international organizations in order to ensure compliance with United States environmental laws, and to promote a level playing field in trade internationally.

- International Compliance Assurance Division
- NEPA Compliance Division

=== Federal Facilities Enforcement Office ===
The Federal Facilities Enforcement Office (FFEO) is responsible for ensuring that federal facilities (e.g. military bases, national parks, government office buildings) take all necessary actions to prevent, control and abate environmental pollution. FFEO facilitates compliance through inspections and enforcement under all environmental statutes and cleanup at federal facilities.

- Site Remediation and Enforcement Staff
- Planning, Prevention, and Compliance Staff

=== Office of Site Remediation Enforcement ===
The Office of Site Remediation Enforcement manages the enforcement of EPA's national hazardous waste cleanup programs. The cleanup enforcement program protects human health and the environment by getting those responsible for a hazardous waste site to either clean up or reimburse EPA for its cleanup. EPA uses a number of cleanup authorities independently and in combination to address specific cleanup situations, including the Superfund law, Resource Conservation and Recovery Act, and the Oil Pollution Act.

- Policy and Program Evaluation Division
- Regional Support Division
- Program Operation Staff

== Executives ==
- David Uhlmann, 2022--2024

== Most Wanted EPA fugitives ==
Since launching the Most Wanted EPA Fugitives website, only 5 fugitives have been captured and 2 fugitives have surrendered as of March 2025. As of 2019 Most Wanted EPA Fugitives were the following males:

- Yousef Abuteir
- Omran Alghazouli
- Larkin Baggett
- Richard Bauder, 2019
- Butch R. Bustamonte
- Raul Chavez-Beltran
- Richard Dorenkamp
- Axel Eiser
- Bernd Gottweis
- Alessandro Giordano
- Carlos Giordano
- Jens Hadler
- John Karayannides
- Stefan Knirsch
- Peter Kuhn
- Prem Kumar, 2011
- Aage Lokkebraten
- Carsten Nagel
- Jurgen Peter
- Frerik Pluimers
- Zaccheo Giovanni Pamio
- Michael Evangelos Psomadakis
- Peter Solemdal
- Kurt Sorboe
- Zdzislaw (Jimmy) Szypulski
- Christian Tejada
- Martin Winterkorn
