= William Emanuel =

American lawyer and government official

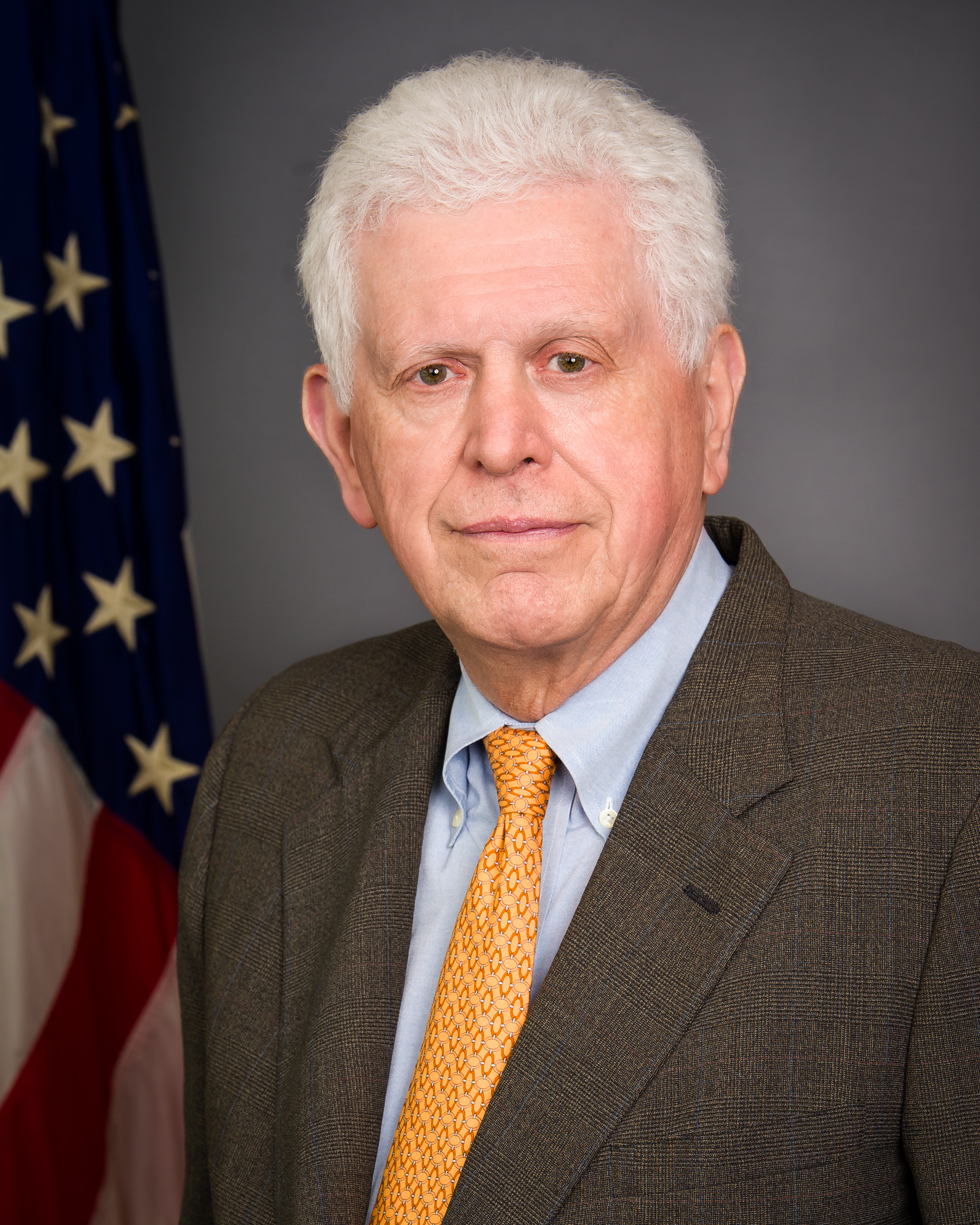
- Official portrait, 2017

Member of the National Labor Relations Board
- In office September 28, 2017 – August 27, 2021
- President: Donald Trump; Joe Biden
- Preceded by: Kent Yoshiho Hirozawa
- Succeeded by: David Prouty

Personal details
- Died: April 2025
- Party: Republican
- Education: Marquette University (AB); Georgetown University (JD)

William Emanuel was an American lawyer and government official who formerly served as a member of the National Labor Relations Board. Prior to assuming that role, he was a shareholder at the law firm Littler Mendelson.

== Education ==
Emanuel received his A.B. from Marquette University and his J.D. from Georgetown Law.

== Legal career ==
Emanuel spent most of his career as a pro-management labor law attorney based in California. His clients have included trade associations, hospitals, school districts, and transportation, logistics, and manufacturing companies.

In June 2017, President Donald Trump nominated Emanuel to be a member of the National Labor Relations Board, which is entrusted with protecting the rights of employees. Emanuel's nomination was supported by a number of business groups and anti-union advocates. He was confirmed by the U.S. Senate on September 25, 2017.

According to The National Law Review, the National Labor Relations Board was "likely to consider a number of significant legal issues once the vacancies are filled, including the NLRB's test for determining whether joint employer relationships exist, the standards for evaluating whether handbooks and work rules interfere with employees' rights under the National Labor Relations Act (NLRA), appropriate units for collective bargaining, the question of whether graduate students and research assistants are employees under the NLRA with the right to collective bargaining and a host of other decisions from the past eight years that more expansively interpreted the NLRA."

Emanuel's term in the NLRB finished in 2021.

== Ethics investigation ==
In February 2018, ProPublica reported that the NLRB Inspector General was investigating whether Emanuel violated government ethics rules. In December 2017, the NLRB had voted 3–2 to reverse its August 2015 determination that franchising involves joint employment. In February 2018, the NLRB vacated that decision after the NLRB's Inspector General reported that Emanuel should have been recused because he had been the franchiser's attorney in the 2015 matter.

== Personal life ==
Emanuel died in April 2025.

Political offices
Preceded by Kent Yoshiho Hirozawa	Member of the National Labor Relations Board; 2017–present	Incumbent
