= Occupational Safety and Health Review Commission =

Agency overview
- Jurisdiction: Federal government of the United States
- Headquarters: 1120 20th Street NW, 9th Floor, Washington, D.C. 20036-3457
- Annual budget: $13.2 million (2021)
- Agency executive: Jonathan Snare, Chairman
- Website: www.oshrc.gov

The Occupational Safety and Health Review Commission (OSHRC) is an independent federal agency created under the Occupational Safety and Health Act to decide contests of citations or penalties resulting from OSHA inspections of American work places. It is not part of the Department of Labor or OSHA. It functions as a two-tiered administrative court, with established procedures for conducting hearings, receiving evidence, and rendering decisions by its Administrative Law Judges, and if necessary discretionary review of those decisions by a panel of Commissioners.

== Membership ==
The commission consists of three members, who are appointed by the President, by and with the advice and consent of the Senate. The President appoints, by statute, members who by reason of training, education, or experience are qualified. A maximum of two members may be members of the same political party. They each serve terms of six years, and a member may not continue to serve after the end of their term. Two members is necessary for the commission to have a quorum, and official action can be taken only on the affirmative vote of at least two members. The President designates one of the members to serve as chairman. A member may be removed by the President for inefficiency, neglect of duty, or malfeasance in office.

=== Commissioners ===
The current commission as of May 24, 2026:

Position	Name	Party	Sworn in	Term expires
Chairman	Jonathan Snare	Republican	November 3, 2025	April 27, 2029
Member	Vacant	—N/a	—	April 27, 2027
Member	Vacant	—N/a	—	April 27, 2031

=== Nominations ===
President Trump has nominated the following to fill seats on the board. They await Senate confirmation.

Name	Party	Term expires	Replacing
Michael Doyle	Republican	April 27, 2031	Cynthia Attwood

== See also ==
- Title 29 of the Code of Federal Regulations
