= Keezer =

Keezer is a surname. Notable people with the surname include:

- Dexter Keezer (1895–1991), American economist and academic administrator
- Geoffrey Keezer (born 1970), American jazz pianist

== See also ==
- Leezer
