= Weinstock =

Weinstock (German: grapevine) is a Jewish and a German surname. Notable people with this surname include:

- Anna Weinstock Schneider (1895-1979), American labor conciliator
- Arnold Weinstock (1924–2002), English businessman
- Bob Weinstock (1928–2006), founder of Prestige Records
- Carol Weinstock (1914–1971), American artist and educator
- Eleanor Frank Weinstock (born 1929), American former politician
- Evan Weinstock (born 1991), American Olympic bobsledder
- George Weinstock (born 1949), American geneticist and microbiologist
- Gertrude Weinstock (1904–1985), American pianist
- Harris Weinstock (1854–1922), American businessman in Sacramento, California
- Herbert Weinstock (1905–1971), American music historian
- Izzy Weinstock (1913–1997), American football player
- Jack Weinstock (died 1969), American author and playwright
- Judith Weinstock (born 1940), Israeli author
- Julian Weinstock (c. 1922–1993), American architect, real estate contractor and philanthropist from Los Angeles, California
- Maia Weinstock, American Wikipedia editor and Lego enthusiast
- Marcus Weinstock (born 1984), Swedish professional ice hockey player
- Sophia Petrillo, fictional character in TV series The Golden Girls and its spinoffs (full name: Sophia Angelo Spirelli Petrillo Weinstock)
- Sylvia Weinstock, American baker and cake-decorator
- Todd Weinstock, American guitarist and producer
- Ulf Weinstock (born 1952), ice hockey player who played for the Swedish national team
