= The Vollrath Company =

American manufacturing company

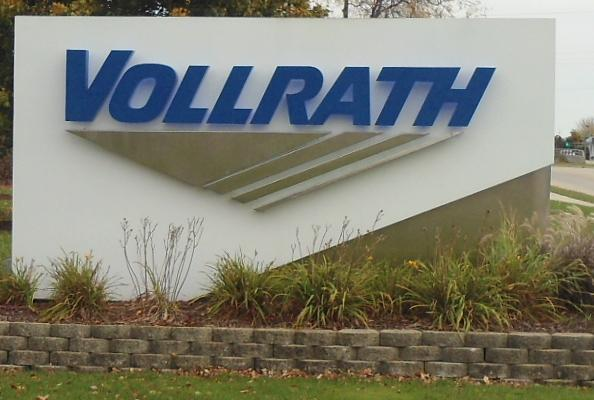
- Type: Private
- Industry: Manufacturing, Foodservice
- Predecessor: Sheboygan Cast Steel Company
- Founded: February 26, 1874
- Founder: Jacob Vollrath
- Headquarters: 1236 North 18th Street; Sheboygan, Wisconsin
- Area served: United States, Canada, Mexico
- Key people: Paul Bartelt (CEO and President)
- Owner: Windway Capital Corporation

The Vollrath Company is an American company based in Sheboygan, Wisconsin that manufactures stainless steel and aluminum equipment and smallwares (utensils etc.), and deep draw stainless steel items, for commercial and institutional foodservice operations.

== Overview ==
Vollrath manufactures equipment and supplies for the commercial foodservice industry and sells its products through two-tier distribution. The company's foodservice equipment offering includes smallwares and countertop equipment, along with serving systems and components. The product offering for smallwares includes buffet and tabletop service; cleaning and safety equipment; cookware and bakeware; food delivery and transport; kitchen essentials; steam table pans and accessories; and warewashing and handling. The product offering for countertop equipment includes cooking equipment; food preparation equipment; frozen treat equipment; and warming equipment. Vollrath’s fabricator components include breath guards; induction drop-ins; induction range and warmer drop-ins; cold drop-ins; hot drop-ins; combination hot/cold drop-ins; drop-in display cases; heated shelves and heat strips; and sinks.

== History ==
=== Start up – 1900 ===
Jacob Vollrath began building farm implements, steam engines, cast iron ranges and cooking utensils in Sheboygan, Wisconsin. He manufactured porcelain enameled pots, pans, plates, cups and other kitchenware by coating cast iron with ceramic glaze. In 1874 it was reported that J.J. Vollrath & Sons was constructing a factory for the production of porcelain hollow ware and cast iron fences. In 1874 he formed the Sheboygan Cast Steel Co. and constructed a plant in Sheboygan to do general foundry work while his son Andrew was in Germany learning porcelain enamelling. The Sheboygan Cast Steel Company produced railroad frogs and small cast parts for the furniture industry. The company expanded into manufacturing cooking ranges and agricultural implements.

In 1876, Andrew returned from Germany and production of enameled ware began. After making a few enameled cast iron utensils, Jacob went from one community to the next with a cart selling his stock. By 1881, Jacob employed 40 men and grossed $50,000 per year. The company flourished and was incorporated in 1884 under the name of Jacob J. Vollrath Manufacturing Company.

In 1893 Vollrath exhibited iron ware at the Chicago World's Fair.

By 1886, Jacob's business had expanded so much that his facility covered an entire block. He purchased 30 acres (120,000 m^{2}) of land along Lake Michigan for a home and a park. The 16-acre (65,000 m^{2}) which became Vollrath Park was later donated to the city by his heirs in 1917. In 1887, the Vollrath facility was one of the largest plants in the country devoted to enameled ware.

Jacob's second son, Carl, originated and patented “Speckled” enamel in 1889, which became common. Sheet steel stamped ware was added to the product line in 1892, which increased the range of items considerably. A catalog from that era shows the addition of coffee boilers, dippers, ladles, cake and pie pans, bowls and cups. Already manufacturing enameled cast iron sinks, stove reservoirs, refrigerator tanks, and water cooler tanks, Vollrath added bathtubs to the product line in 1895, although they weren't included in a catalog. At the World's Columbian Exposition in Chicago. Jacob died in May 1898, passing the company on to his children.

=== 1901-1929 Growth ===
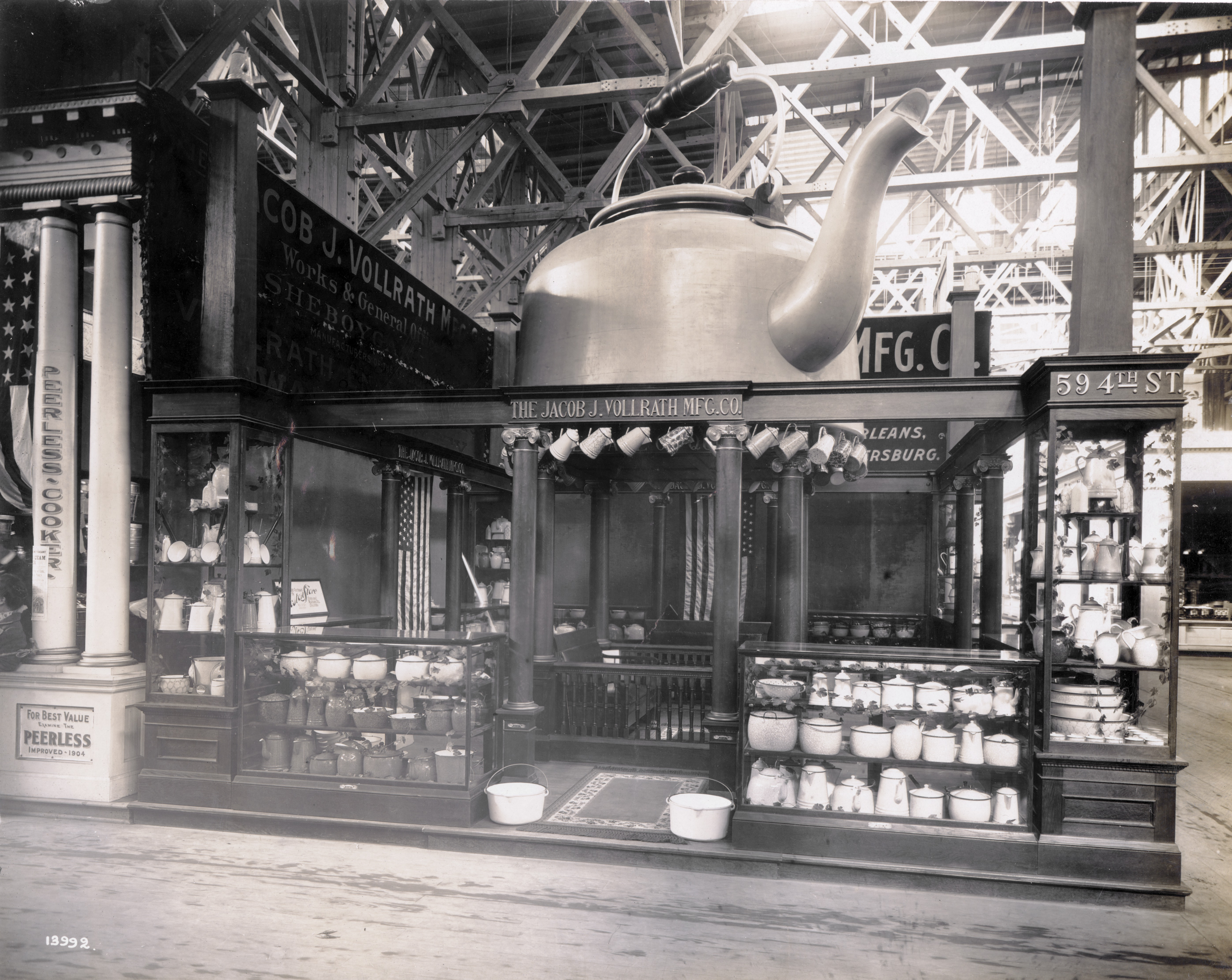
Exhibit of cooking utensils made by the Jacob J. Vollrath Manufacturing Company in the Palace of Manufactures at the 1904 World's Fair.

In 1900 the company discontinued the manufacture of plumbing goods in order to devote its energies entirely to the cooking utensil field. The management at that time believed that concentration on one product would result in a better quality product. The company continued to grow, opening the first branch office in Chicago in 1900. A New York branch was built circa 1903, and a San Francisco office was built circa 1909. In 1904 Vollrath earned top honors for “Excellence in the Production of Colored and Plain, Stamped Steel and Cast Iron Enameled Wares” at the Louisiana Purchase Exposition in St. Louis.

In February 1908, the need for a shorter company name was realized and a new corporation, the Vollrath Company, was organized. To ensure that Vollrath enameled ware maintained its high quality, a new plant was designed. In 1910 construction of the new facility began at 18th and Michigan Ave in Sheboygan, Wisconsin, which is the current site of the corporate offices and stainless steel manufacturing plant. A City ordinance was passed in 1909 to allow the Chicago and North Western Transportation Company to build a spur track along city streets to the new plant. A complete unit for the economical handling of the product was built, where each department housed in surroundings designed for that particular process. The plans were for a massive plant including an 83000 s.f. Warehouse, a 38000 s.f. Enameling Building, a 10000 s.f. Pickling Shop and a two-story 9000 s.f. Mill and Mixing Building. The construction was planned to take several years. To fund the construction, the capitalization of the company was increased from $100,000 to $300,000.

Expansion continued at the Vollrath facility during the late 1910s and throughout the 1920s. In 1912 an 80000 sf addition was constructed. Razing of the original foundry site on North Sixth street was begun in 1916. The entire site had been sold to C. Reiss Coal with agreement the Vollrath would clear the site. In 1918 new additions were added to the south end of the finishing and enameling shops. In 1919 the office building and gate lodge (then known as the watchman's house) were constructed; in 1920 the power house was built. In 1922 the carton shed was added onto the building that was known as hay storage and the machine shop and annealing room were added in 1923.

In 1919 steam table pans and equipment were first featured in the Vollrath catalog. The pans were sold only to bona fide steam table manufacturers and were produced in sixteen sizes. The heaviest, a meat panel, weighing 35 pounds, featured the meat platter as an integral part of the pan.

In 1928, Vollrath was still expanding physically and increasing the product range. It made another addition to its warehouse and there were over 800 items in the catalog. Jean C. Vollrath became president of the Vollrath Company in 1932 after the death of his father. The Board Chairman was Walter J. Kohler Sr., Jacob's grandson who served as governor of Wisconsin from 1929 to 1931.

=== 1930-1945 The Great Depression and World War II ===
During the years of the Great Depression and under the guidance of President J.C. Vollrath, the company continued its entrepreneurial practices. By the late 1930s, Vollrath had begun replacing some enamelware with stainless steel. Vollrath's field sales force numbered nineteen in 1938.

The first military contract related to World War II was with the Navy for spoons and ladles announced in August, 1940. A much larger follow-on contract was awarded in March, 1941 for ladles, skimmers, turners and spoons. With war imminent, Vollrath gradually converted to war production in late 1941, increasing the government supplies until August 1, 1942. At that time, Vollrath was working 100% on defense work, which continued throughout the war. By September 1943, Vollrath's price list of porcelain enamelware permitted for civilian use was strictly limited to a few dozen necessary items such as coffee pots, boilers, and percolators, vegetable insets, bain maries, double boilers, dish pans, ladles, pails, hotel pans, sauce pans, and stock pots for kitchen use.

On June 28, 1945, Vollrath was awarded the Army-Navy "E" Award for Vollrath's record in the production of materials needed in the war effort. Vollrath produced more than 12 million canteens during the war, along with many other products for military use, such as mess trays, meat cans, irrigators, and basins. Lapel pins were given to 764 Vollrath employees in recognition of this accomplishment.

=== 1945-1959 The polio epidemic ===
When the polio epidemic of the late 1940s and early 1950s struck, Vollrath developed the Polio-Pak Heater. Selling for $275, this 37" high stainless steel electrical unit could produce 15 double-thick steam heated woolen packs to administer to polio patients. In addition to treating polio victims, the Polio-Pak Heater could also be used for treatment of infections, vascular and muscular congestion, and any physical therapy that required either hot moist or hot dry packs. Vollrath also developed a 20½" high portable size Polio-Pak Heater for visiting nurses to use in patient's home.

=== Walter J. Kohler Jr. ===
Walter J. Kohler Jr., Jacob's great-grandson, joined the Vollrath Company Board of Directors in 1939 upon his father's death, and became the Vollrath Company's fifth president in 1947 after acquiring a controlling interest in the firm, succeeding his uncle Jean C. Vollrath. After joining the Vollrath Company, Walter became a delegate-at-large to the Republican National Convention. He had some political experience as a young man, having assisted his father, Walter J. Kohler Sr., in his successful Wisconsin gubernatorial campaign in the late 1920s. Walter J. Kohler Jr. became one of the few three-term governors in Wisconsin history. His terms as governor ran from 1951 through 1957, and he was heavily involved with the presidential campaign of Dwight D. Eisenhower in the 1952 election.

=== 1960-1979 Product expansion ===
Expansion, acquisition, relocation and new product development became Vollrath's credo. A new 22,000-square-foot (2,000 m^{2}) foundry was dedicated in early 1965. In April 1968 the newly erected 96,000-square-foot (8,900 m^{2}) fabrication building was dedicated during an open house. The 400 by 240-foot (73 m) building was constructed for production of the mobile equipment line and the new line of laboratory animal housing units for primates, dogs, cats, rabbits and rodents. It has since been converted into the shipping center. In 1970 Vollrath began molding medical plastics in Sheboygan. The plastic operation was subsequently moved to Gallaway, Tennessee in 1975. In 1973 construction was started on an expansion of the plant in River Falls, WI that would expand that facility to a total of 150,000-square-foot (14,000 m^{2}).

In early 1974, Vollrath leased property in Clarksville, Tennessee, moving the cookware finishing there from Sheboygan. Later that year Vollrath also purchased the hollowware and related assets of the Admiral Craft Corporation of New York. The newly acquired products were dubbed Century Ware to commemorate Vollrath's 100th year.

Vollrath entered the foodservice plastic marketplace in 1976 with the purchase of the Bolta line of about 800 different plastic containers, trays, racks and other foodservice items from the chemical and plastics division of the General Tire and Rubber Company. Also that year, Vollrath was the first business in Sheboygan County to install a PBX phone system. Construction of a 24,000-square-foot (2,200 m^{2}) addition to the south end of the original office building was begun in June, 1977.

=== 1980-1988 Movement into the new era ===
In the 1980s, the Vollrath Company acquired and divested itself of several ventures. It consolidated the house wares and direct sales divisions to form a new consumer products division in 1980, and dissolved it at the end of 1984.

By 1981 Vollrath purchased the business of Dyna International Corp. from Peters & Company of Boston, Massachusetts. Vollrath eventually sold the line of self-leveling dispensers, dish and utility carts in 1986 to Servolift of Boston. In 1982 Vollrath sold its sink line to Keyline Sales of Elkhart, Indiana. That year Vollrath constructed an addition to the foundry for investment casting. That portion of the foundry business was in operation until 1985.

In April 1983 the Vollrath Company decentralized. Nine divisions were formed: food service, management systems, refrigeration, information network, management services, management consulting and education, consumer products, health care and international. Each division functioned under the corporate umbrella but had its own president.

In 1984 Vollrath installed a new IBM 3038-EX computer. It was the first of the IBM EX series to be installed in Wisconsin, and the fourth “generation” of IBM computer equipment ordered by Vollrath, considered to be a pioneer in the extensive use of such equipment in business and service.

As part of the decentralization, a subsidiary company, Vollrath Refrigeration Inc. of River Falls, WI, was sold to Kenmare Capital Corp.

Vollrath completed decentralization in January 1989.

=== Terry J. Kohler ===
Terry Jodok Kohler was the third generation of Kohler's to serve at Vollrath, joining the firm in 1962 after more than eight years in the United States Air Force and at MIT. He was the great-great grandson of Jacob J. Vollrath. A graduate of MIT, his undergraduate degree was in industrial management, with an MBA in Industrial Management from the MIT Sloan School of Management. He served as president, CEO, and chairman of the board. His thesis and research were in the area of business application of large scale digital computers in smaller companies. Upon joining Vollrath, Terry pushed the integration of computers into manufacturing, installing the first computer (an IBM 1440 system) in 1964, launching Vollrath to the forefront of the industry in control of inventories, production management, and manufacturing scheduling. He was responsible for the installation of the series of IBM computers, and allowed the company to serve as “guinea pig” for computer development. He also orchestrated the decentralization of the company in 1983 and negotiated the purchase of North Sails in 1984.

=== 1989-2014 Modern acquisitions ===
In late 1989, the Vollrath Company purchased the Leyse commercial aluminum cookware line from General Housewares Corporation, Stamford, Connecticut. Purchase of the Kewaunee, Wisconsin manufacturing facility gave Vollrath greater control in supplying commercial aluminum cookware rather than relying on a foreign manufacturer for production. In 1991, Vollrath acquired the Bloomfield Industries division of Specialty Equipment Companies Inc.

On December 15, 1992 Vollrath reached the landmark position of $100 million in annual sales.

In May 1994 Vollrath acquired a line of food warmers and accessories with the purchase of Idea/Medalie Division, Rogers, Minnesota. Production of the warmers was moved to Vollrath's Kewaunee, Wisconsin plant.

On September 30, 1996 the Vollrath Company, Inc. entered into a restructuring agreement and became the Vollrath Company, L.L.C. Vollrath had purchased Luitink Manufacturing Co. of Menomonee Falls, and Oconomowoc, Wisconsin in May 1999 to give the company new flexibility for precision created smallwares. In 2004 Vollrath acquired Corsair Display Systems in Canandaigua, New York, expanding their equipment capabilities and allowing for the introduction of mobile carts to the Vollrath catalog and expanding their customizing capabilities. In 2009, Vollrath acquired three companies:

- Luxine in Malibu, California to increase their capabilities in the emerging field of induction technology.
- Anvil in Asheville, NC, to branch into countertop cooking equipment.
- Lincoln Smallwares to expand its cookware, bakeware and manual food processor offerings including the Wear-Ever and Redco brands.

In 2011, The Vollrath Company acquired Traex Co. in Dane, WI from Libbey Inc of Toledo, OH.

Even though Vollrath had been selling its products in Europe since 1985, growth in the European market prompted the opening of a headquarters in Rijen, Netherlands in 2011.

In May 2012, Vollrath acquired Polar Ware, and its division, Stoelting, a Wisconsin-based food service manufacturer with focus on serving pans and utensils. In Nov, 2012, the Stoelting Process Solutions division was sold to RELCO, LLC. Also in 2012, Vollrath acquired Acry Fab Inc., Sun Prairie, WI. Acry Fab is a manufacturer of food accessory dispensers for the convenience store market.

In August 2012, Vollrath started construction of a distribution center in Sheboygan. It was their first large scale construction project since the 1960s.

In March 2013, Vollrath announced that they were moving all of their production in China to Sheboygan citing rising production costs, inconsistent quality, and difficult production scheduling. They had been manufacturing as many as 3 million food pans a year in Shanghai. The company was unable to accomplish the return of production equipment that it had purchased and supplied the contract manufacturer in China.

== Unions ==
Labor unions have played a part in shaping the company over the past century. The first major impact unions had were indirect. Vollrath had to shut down its foundry and lay off 175 workers due to lack of coal during a coal miner's strike in 1919.

Organizing effort by the Enamel Workers Union in 1937 led to accusations of discriminatory labor practices against union members with one employee's termination resulting in hearing before Atty Nathan Feinsinger of the Wisconsin Labor Relations board. Various unions have been involved in organizing workers for collective bargaining, fair wages and better working conditions. Disputes with company management led to a number of strikes over the years. Strikes occurred in 1946, 1967, 1968, and in 2022.

In the 1957 contract negotiations, the workers were represented by Local 167 of United Electrical Radio and Machine Workers of America (UE).

The strike in 1946 was about changing rates for the piece-rate portion of workers' pay. Workers were represented by Local 167, Farm Equipment and Metal Workers, CIO. Workers were represented by the UAW during the 1967 and 1968 strikes. The 1967 strike occurred over dispute of unilateral curtailment in employee rest breaks.

== Today ==
Eric Lampe became President and CEO in July 2023. Paul Bartelt succeeded Tom Belot as president and chief executive officer in September 2009.

== List of acquisitions ==
Year	Company	Location(s)	Products
1974	Admiral Craft Corporation	New York	hollowware and related assets
1976	Bolta Food Service	Ionia, MI	plastic containers, trays, racks and other foodservice items
1981	Dyna International Corp	Boston, MA	self-leveling dispensers, dish and utility carts
1984	North Sails	Milford, CT	yacht racing sails (divested in 1989)
1989	Leyse Manufacturing	Kewaunee, WI	commercial aluminum cookware line
1991	Bloomfield	Chicago, IL	smallwares and cart line
1991	Idea/Medalie	Rogers, MN	food warmers and accessories
1999	Luitink Manufacturing Co	Menomonee Falls, WI, Oconomowoc, WI	
2004	Corsair Display Systems	Canandaigua, NY	
2009	Luxine	Malibu, California	increase capabilities in the field of induction technology
2009	Anvil	Asheville, NC	to branch into countertop cooking equipment
2009	Lincoln Smallwares	Manitowoc, WI	to expand its cookware, bakeware and manual food processor offerings including the Wear-Ever and Redco brands
2011	Traex Smallware	Dane, WI	plastics offering
2012	Polarware	Kiel, WI	products for food service and health care applications
2012	Stoelting Foodservice and Cleaning	Kiel, WI	frozen treat equipment, industrial and ultrasonic cleaning equipment, and process equipment
2012	Acry Fab Inc	Sun Prairie, WI	display and dispensing products for the convenience store market
2015	Miguel Pujadas, S.A.	Santa Coloma, Spain	European manufacturer and importer of cookware, steam table pans, buffet and tabletop serving equipment, warewashing racks and small equipment
2017	Belleco, Inc.	Saco, Maine	conveyor toasters and ovens
2018	Carlson Products	Maize, Kansas	standard and custom components, along with bakeware products such as pizza pans, stacking pans, sheet pans, grill pans and panini pans
2019	Albers Mechanical Contractors, Inc. (Assets)	St. Paul, Minnesota	high-end custom fabrication
