= National War Labor Board (1942–1945) =

U.S. World War II government agency

Agency overview
- Formed: January 12, 1942
- Preceding agency: National Defense Mediation Board
- Dissolved: December 31, 1945
- Superseding agency: Wage Stabilization Board
- Jurisdiction: Federal government of the United States
- Headquarters: Washington, D.C.
- Employees: 2,613 (1945)
- Annual budget: $15,596,000 (FY 1945)
- Agency executives: William Hammatt Davis, chair (January 1942 – March 1945); George W. Taylor, chair (March 1945 – October 1945); Lloyd K. Garrison, chair (October 1945 – December 1945)
- Parent agency: Office of Economic Stabilization (April 1943 on)

The National War Labor Board, commonly the War Labor Board (NWLB or WLB), was an independent agency of the United States government, established January 12, 1942, by an executive order of President Franklin D. Roosevelt, the purpose of which was to mediate labor disputes as part of the American home front during World War II.

The twelve-member board had a tripartite structure, with four members from each of industry, labor, and the public, with William Hammatt Davis as its chair. Acting as an arbitration tribunal, the board replaced normal collective bargaining during the war, as it could intervene in any labor dispute that it saw as endangering "the effective prosecution of the war" and put into place a settlement. It administered wage control in national industries such as automobiles, shipping, railways, airlines, telegraph lines, and mining.

The board was additionally divided into twelve Regional War Labor Boards which handled both labor dispute settlement and wage stabilization functions for specific geographic sections of the country. The board also had a number of commissions and panels set up to deal with certain specific industries.

Important decisions the board made included a "maintenance of membership" rule regarding union security; an inflation-based rule known as the "Little Steel formula" for putting an upper bound on wage increases; and rulings that required equal pay for equal work for women employees and disallowed pay differentials based on employees' race. As one assessment has written, the War Labor Board "held enormous power over American production and industry."

== Background and origins ==
The strength of the American labor movement gained during the 1880s with the creation of the American Federation of Labor (AFL); weakened during the 1920s due to overall prosperity and opposition from the National Association of Manufacturers and similar industry groups; and then regained strength again in the 1930s during the Great Depression with the formation of the Congress of Industrial Organizations (CIO). The CIO, helped by the passage of legislation such as the National Industrial Recovery Act of 1933 and the Wagner Act of 1935, attained a strong position in industries such as steel, oil, rubber, and automobiles.

Normally, the United States did not engage in forms of wage and price controls except under wartime conditions (the first peacetime attempts would not occur until the early 1960s and especially in 1971). Following the start of World War II in Europe in 1939, even though the United States was not yet itself at war, the country began an economic mobilization; it was considered as almost obvious that the government would have to put into place some kind of program to prevent or bring to an immediate end strikes, if the mobilization was to be effective.

Under the Roosevelt administration, several federal entities began overseeing industrial production and industrial relations, the last of bodies being the Supply Priorities and Allocations Board for goods production and the National Defense Mediation Board for labor issues, but none of them were especially effective. In particular, the Mediation Board had proved unable to resolve a dispute in summer 1941 at the Federal Shipbuilding and Drydock Company in New Jersey, and then had become inconsequential following a November 1941 dispute involving the CIO and certain coal mines that were owned by steel companies. That dispute ended with the CIO dropping out of the board.

== Creation and structure ==
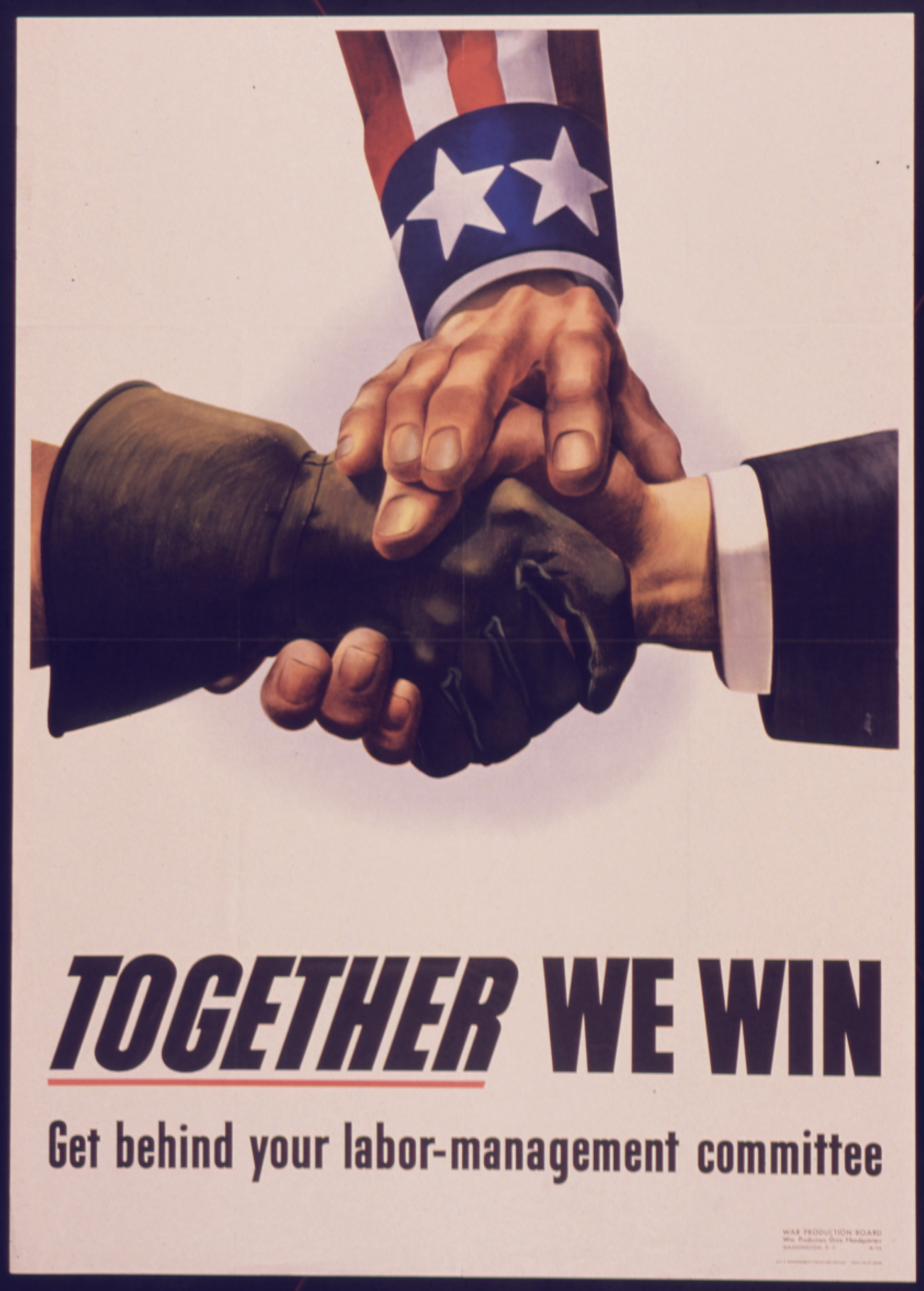
Poster put out by the War Production Board, emphasizing the need for labor and industry to cooperate during the war

Following the attack on Pearl Harbor and the United States entering the war in December 1941, there was an immediate desire for stronger agencies to be in place. In January 1942, Roosevelt established the War Production Board. The danger of strikes occurring during wartime was not just a direct military cost but also a public outrage over the sight of, as one study puts it, "workers' laying down tools [while] men are shouldering arms on battle fronts, the possible danger to the security of loved ones". A major labor-management conference took place in December 1941, and while labor and industry representatives could not agree on everything, they did agree on a no-strike, no-lockout pledge for the duration of the war and on having some kind of mediation board, the structure of which the Roosevelt administration would largely be able to determine.

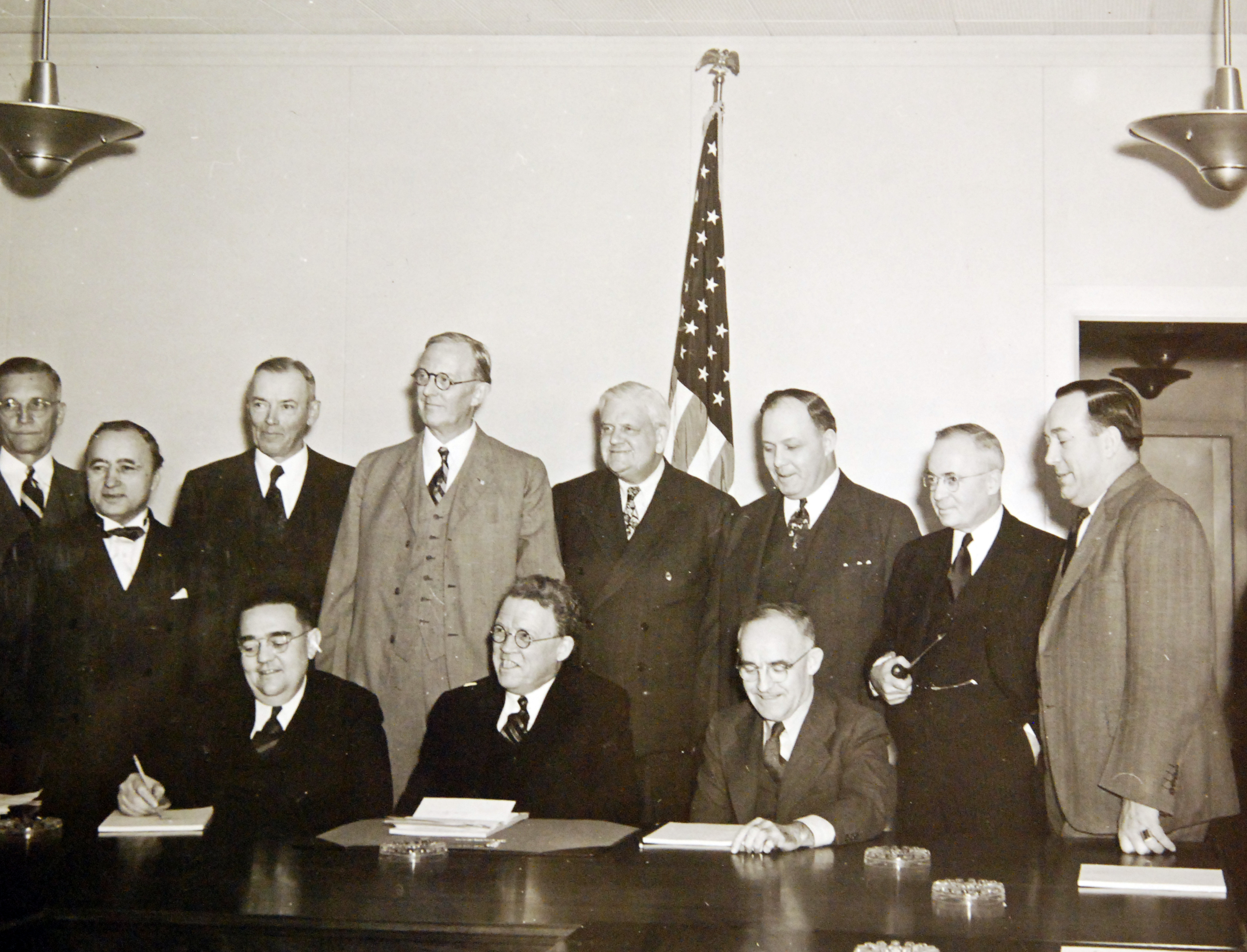
The members of the War Labor Board, as photographed before their initial meeting on January 16, 1942; Chairman Davis is front row center

So the National War Labor Board was established by Roosevelt under Executive Order 9017, issued on January 12, 1942. Roosevelt said that "the national interest demands that there shall be no interruption of any work which contributes to the effective prosecution of the war". The NWLB was given the authority to "finally determine" any labor dispute which threatened to interrupt war production, and to stabilize union wages and benefits during the war. The United States Congress had no role in the creation of the board. The executive order which created the NWLB was imprecise in delineating its jurisdictional responsibilities, a lacuna which later would lead to some bureaucratic frictions. In any case, the creation of the board was an above-the-fold story in the next day's New York Times.

The twelve-member board had a tripartite structure, with four members from each of industry, labor, and the public. While tripartite arrangements had sometimes been used in the past, they were always in a voluntary or advisory arrangement; the War Labor Board was the first to do so in a body with more force behind it. The chairman of the new board was William Hammatt Davis, a patent attorney from New York; he had been chair of the National Defense Mediation Board, which was abolished as part of Roosevelt's action. Roosevelt had confidence in Davis, and as Davis had established a reputation for being impartial during this prior stint, neither labor nor industry protested his being named to head the new entity.

== Operation ==
"... the National War Labor Board and its component parts had four basic functions to perform. First, the Board was to decide dispute cases. Second, it was to achieve [compliance] with its directive orders in dispute cases. ... Third, ... stabilize wages through its power to approve adjustments in wage rates. Fourth, [enforcement of] its principles of wage stabilization."

— Kheel Center for Labor-Management Documentation and Archives, Cornell University Library, New York State School of Industrial and Labor Relations at Cornell University

Dispute cases came to the War Labor Board from the U.S. Secretary of Labor, usually after the United States Conciliation Service, which was part of that labor department, had been unable to bring the disagreement to a settlement. But the board repeatedly stated that its arbitration procedures were not supposed to be replacing collective bargaining, and indeed, the board insisted that collective bargaining have been fully tried before it would take on a dispute, including use of the Conciliation Service. Overall, about 27 percent of cases received by the Conciliation Service ended up being sent to the War Labor Board.

Once a dispute was accepted by the War Labor Board, it was mandated to see it through to a binding settlement, whether by mediation, voluntary arbitration, or imposed arbitration. This gave the board more power than either its immediate predecessor National Defense Mediation Board or its First World War namesake.

Despite some parties urging that the War Labor Board adopt a broad set of principles to guide is decisions, it did not, instead resolving issues on more of a case-by-case basis. George W. Taylor, the vice chair of the board, later made the case that such a course was the only realistic choice, given the urgencies of the war effort and the wide gulf between labor and industry perspectives.

In the face of the no-strike pledge agreed to by union leaders, there were a number of wildcat strikes during the war. Indeed, the number increased during 1943, which led to the passage in June of that year of the War Labor Disputes Act. This gave the War Labor Board even more power.

While in legal terms the War Labor Board did not have the power to go to the court system in order force compliance to its rulings, it could go to the White House, which in the ultimate case had the power to seize factories and plants. This threat tended to be more effective against violations by management than against violations by labor. In practice, the board established what one scholar has called a "common law of industrial relations", built up over a series of decisions and precedents from the regional boards and panels and commissions and considered as precedents or not by the national board. Penalties for giving wage increases higher than NWLB regulations permitted could involve disallowing those payments as allowed costs for tax calculations or for contracting bids. Penalties for unions that were flaunting regulations could include removal of overtime or shift premium benefits or removal of union security provisions. One scholar has described the board's powers as "semicompulsive".

The public members of the board were often the ones to decide matters, as the labor and industry representatives adopted the expected partisan viewpoints. In discussions on the board, both labor and industry representatives tended to use strong language and arguments, although it was often for the sake of effect. The economist Dexter Merriam Keezer, who was a public member of the national board in the later stages of the war, noted that the board's business was conducted in a "socially rugged manner" in which "it was commonplace to have charges ranging from those of deceitfulness, venality, and vulgar avarice to the relatively mild accusation that one was being willfully and stubbornly obtuse tossed around the Board and accented by shouting and table pounding." Nevertheless, Keezer said, such accusations were the custom in American labor relations and were rarely meant to be taken personally.

The National War Labor Board displaced the pre-war National Labor Relations Board (NLRB) as the main focus of federal labor relations for the duration of the war. Although Roosevelt instructed the NWLB not to intrude on jurisdiction exercised by the NLRB, the War Labor Board did not honor this request, and at times the purposes of the two bodies were at odds. From 1942 to 1945, the NRLB chairman, Harry A. Millis, tried to secure a jurisdictional agreement with the NWLB, but these discussions proved fruitless and Millis broke them off near the conclusion of the war.

Throughout the course of the war, the NWLB received a total of 20,692 dispute cases. Some 17,650 of these cases were resolved in some fashion by the board, in actions that affected over 12 million workers. In addition, they received over 450,000 requests for voluntary wage or salary changes, of which almost all were decided on by the board. These voluntary cases ended up affecting around 26 million workers.

== Key decisions ==
=== Union security ===
"During World War II, the National War Labor Board was the only large governmental agency that both used interest group representatives as formal members of collegial bodies and at the same time gave those bodies quasi-legislative, quasi-judicial, and administrative power."

— Allan R. Richards, University of New Mexico, 1952

While, following Pearl Harbor, unions had readily agreed to forego strike actions for the duration of the war, an ongoing and more difficult issue to resolve was that of union security – whether there would be open shops or closed shops, with business and labor taking predictably opposite sides. President Roosevelt decided to leave the question for the new War Labor Board to decide.

In early 1942, the board resolved the matter by putting into place a "maintenance of membership" arrangement, wherein existing union members had to remain union members, with union dues often paid via an automatic checkoff, but neither a closed shop nor a union shop was required and new employees were not obliged to become union members. In June 1942 this was further refined by adding a fifteen-day escape period for new union members to drop their membership, although in practice few new workers would choose to do so. The "maintenance of membership" scheme remained in place for the duration of the war, eventually covering around three million workers, and did much to contribute to the growth of unions during the period.

=== Little Steel formula ===
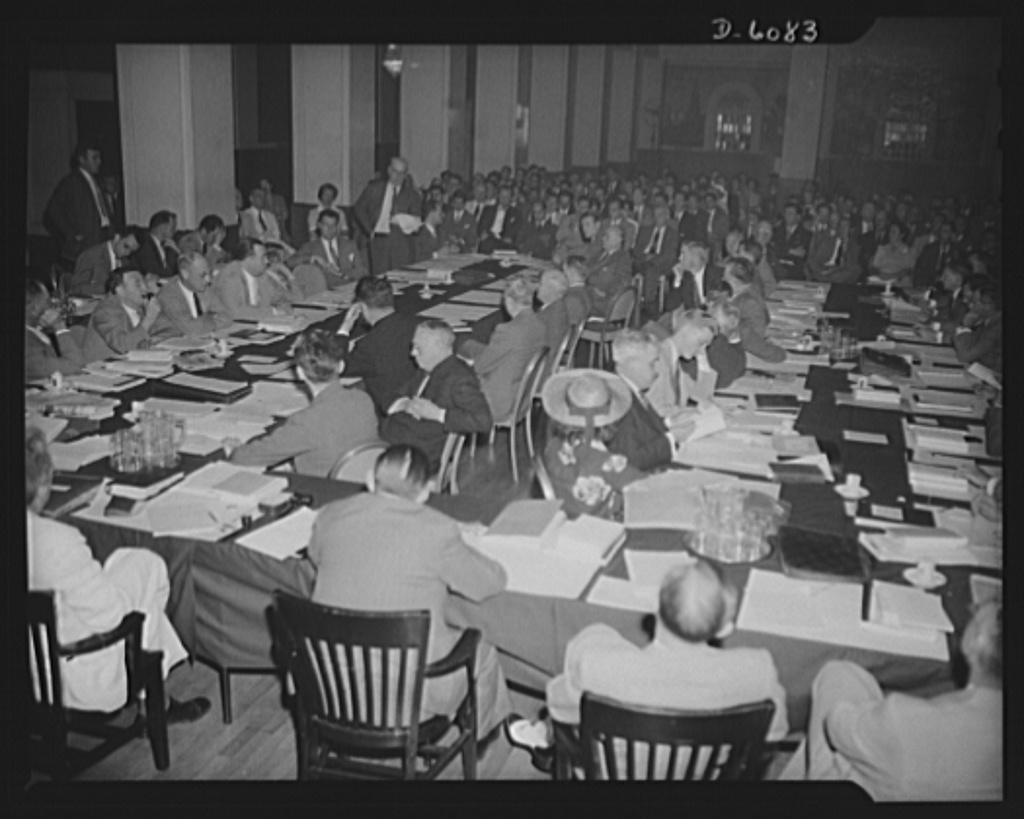
Scene from the "Little Steel" hearing held by the National War Labor Board at the Hotel Washington in Washington, D.C., on July 1, 1942

One of the board's mandates was to ensure that any wage increases granted during a dispute case would not disrupt the wage structure of the nation as a whole and not contribute to ongoing inflationary pressures. These pressures were due to shortages, both in goods and in the labor supply. A key development in this regard came with the "Little Steel" hearing and decision of July 1942.

The hearing arose from a wage dispute between union demands and four so-called "Little Steel" companies: Bethlehem Steel, Inland Steel, Youngstown Sheet and Tube, and Republic Steel. (The appellation was in contrast to the titan of the industry, U.S. Steel.) Employees of the four companies wanted wage increases of a dollar a day. After hearing arguments for and against, the War Labor Board decided that wage increases should be bounded by the national cost of living increase between January 1941, when prices were stable, and May 1942, when the United States had introduced various anti-inflation measures. Using the cost-of-living index provided by the Bureau of Labor Statistics, this worked out to a fifteen per cent wage increase formula, or forty-four cents per day for the Little Steel employees. There would be allowed exemptions, however, for cases where it could be demonstrated that past inequities or injustices existed.

This determination became known as the "Little Steel formula" and set a precedent for future wage adjustments to meet recent increases in the cost of living. The formula was unpopular with workers, who felt it limited them whilst businesses with large wartime contracts had no limits on the profits they were making. It was likewise unpopular with unions, who felt it violated their normal ability to bargain for higher wages. On the other hand, some fiscal conservatives did not like it either, thinking the increase provision was an insufficient brake on inflation. In any case, while the idea behind the Little Steel formula may have been simple to express, in practice there were often complicating factors and application of the formula by the War Labor Board became a very technical process. In addition, cases had to be resolved more quickly during the war than they might have during normal peacetime collective bargaining.

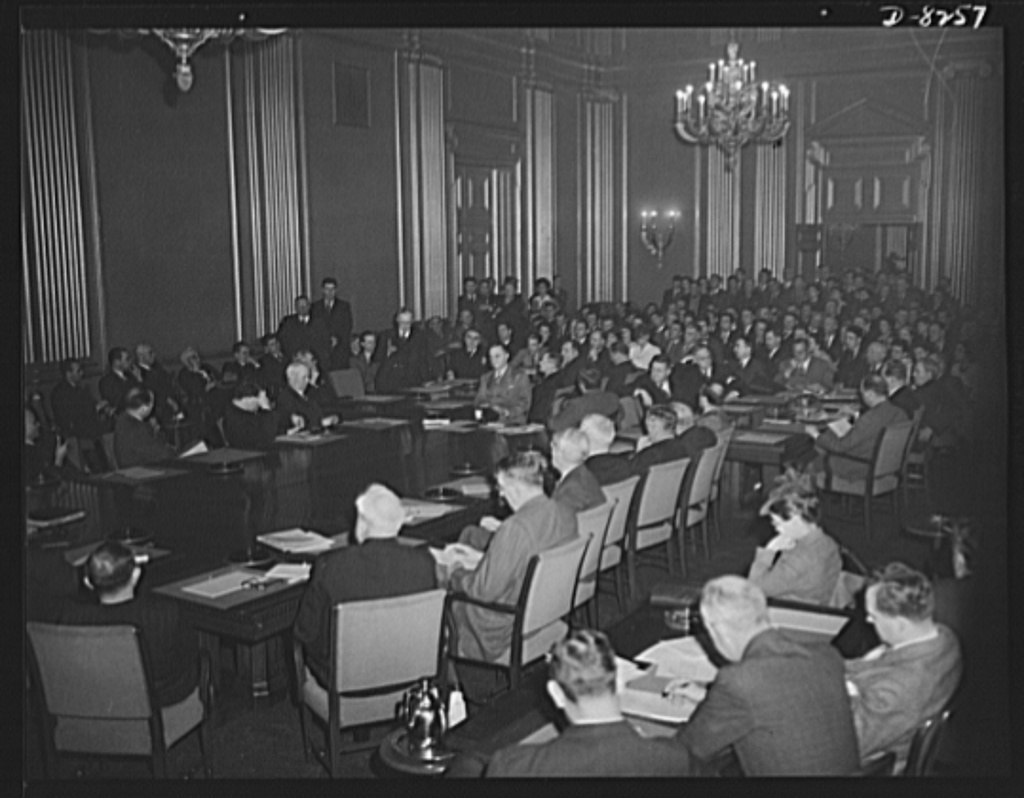
War Labor Board anthracite hearing in Washington, D.C., in January 1943: labor members, seated at the left of conference table, and employer members, seated at the right, hear testimony of striking coal miners

The one large union that most frequently violated the no-strike pledge was the United Mine Workers. Their leader, John L. Lewis, had endorsed the pledge, but he intensely disliked the Little Steel formula. Mine workers felt even more strongly, and staged several prolonged walk-offs, authorized or otherwise, during 1942 and 1943. In particular, the workers considered the Little Steel limits unfair: the onset of the war had created a surge in demand for coal which in turn had increased their exposure to dangerous conditions and resulting mining accidents, and indeed, from December 1941 through May 1943, total U.S. mine workers killed and injured exceeded total U.S. armed forces casualties of killed, wounded, and missing.

The Roosevelt administration was disturbed by the threat of wages increases continuing to cause inflation, in particular those given by the War Labor Board under the inequities exception to the Little Steel formula. On April 8, 1943, President Roosevelt issued Executive Order 9328; this was a "hold-the-line" directive regarding further increases in prices affecting the cost of living and increases in wages and salaries, with a sole exception now being where there were substandard living conditions. The order mandated that the Office of Economic Stabilization, led by Roosevelt's longtime friend James F. Byrnes, review War Labor Board decisions. In a sense, this meant that the War Labor Board was no longer a fully independent government agency, in that there was now an administrative level between the board and the White House.

Because wage increases were limited by the Little Steel formula, during the war unions often sought from the War Labor Board improvements in fringe benefits such as vacation pay and sick leave and extra pay for certain shifts. As these were either not paid in cash or were not changes in hourly rates, they were allowed. Similarly, companies looking to find people to hire during labor shortages could offer fringe benefits as a way of attracting potential employees, and such offers would not be in violation of the Little Steel formula.

=== Equal pay and discrimination ===
The expansion of the American workforce during the war included a large rise in the number of women working, often in industrial jobs that were previously considered the domain of men. These women often found resistance to being hired from employers, from unions, and from fellow workers. This rise in women working also brought about the question of what the women would be paid, and the War Labor Board issued rulings which said that women employees must receive equal pay for equal work.

In particular, there was a September 1942 ruling in a case involving General Motors, followed by a general directive issued by the board in November 1942, to this effect. The board did state, however, that if jobs were "diluted in content" in order for women to be able to perform them, wages for such jobs could be reduced accordingly. This rule was stated as "proportionate rates for proportionate work". There was also a question of how to judge wages across different jobs; the War Labor Board formulated a rule of "equal pay for comparable quantity and quality of works on comparable jobs".

Regarding discrimination in terms of race, the War Labor Board followed the dictates of the Fair Employment Practice Committee, which enforced the Roosevelt administration's 1941 order banning discriminatory employment practices by federal agencies, unions, and companies engaged in work related to the war effort. In particular, in 1943 the board issued an order abolishing pay differentials based on race, saying that "the Negro is necessary for winning the war." The War Labor Board extended this principle to cover areas such as promotions, merit increases, and job classifications.

== Regional boards ==
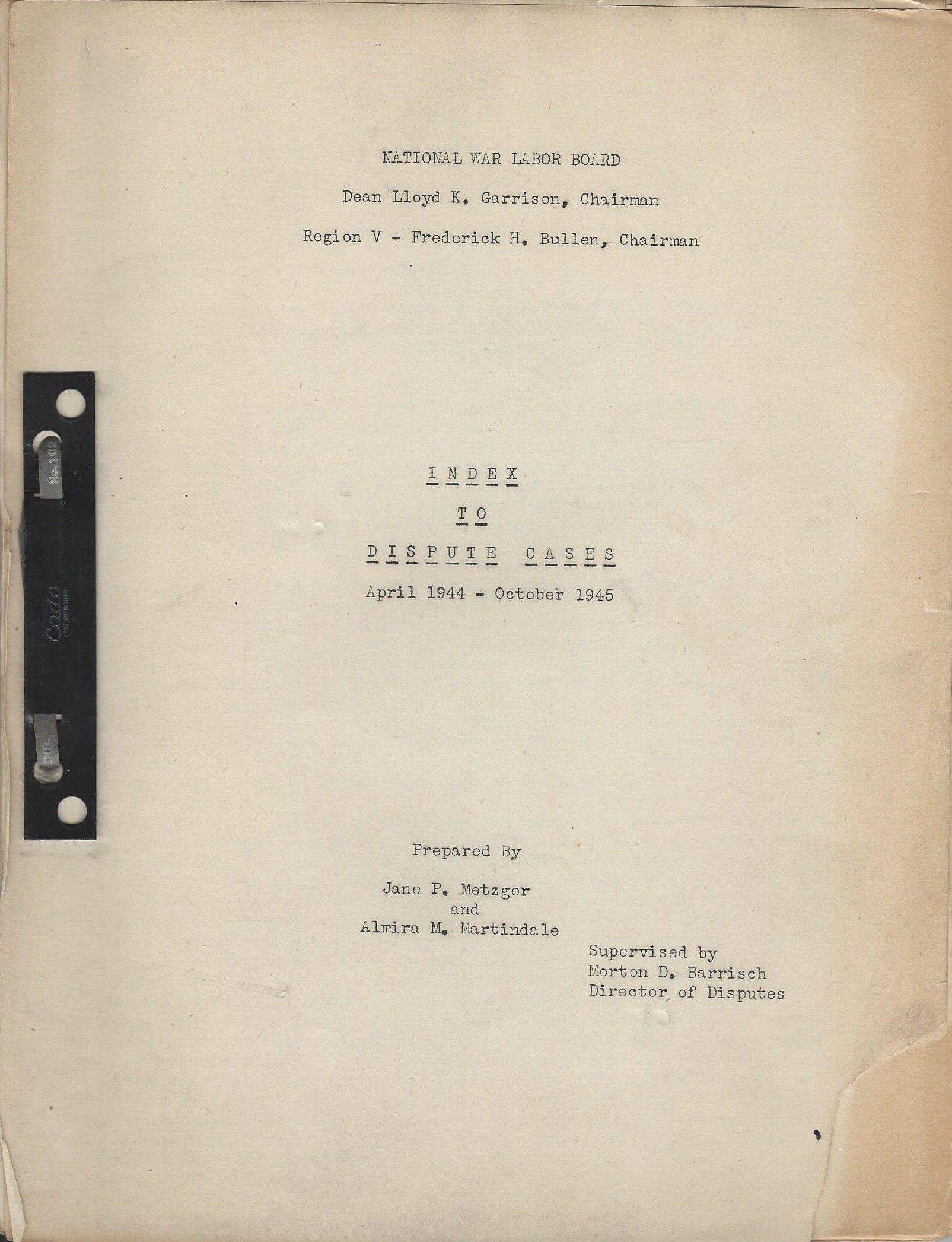
Cover of "Index to Dispute Cases: April 1944 – October 1945", a document prepared in the disputes division of Region V to cover the final period of the war and its aftermath

Following passage of the Stabilization Act of 1942, President Roosevelt created, via Executive Order 9250 issued on October 3, 1942, the Office of Economic Stabilization, whose purpose was to establish a means to control inflation through stricter regulations on prices and wage and salary increases. In particular, the order stated that as a general rule, "No increases in wage rates, granted as a result of voluntary agreement, collective bargaining, conciliation, arbitration, or otherwise, and no decreases in wage rates, shall be authorized unless notice of such increases or decreases shall have been filed with the National War Labor Board, and unless the National War Labor Board has approved such increases or decreases."

This meant that voluntary cases of wage increase proposals were now coming in, in addition to dispute cases. This greatly expanded the workload of the National War Labor Board, and it soon became clear the existing, centralized operation in Washington, D.C. would not be sufficient to the task. At first, the board created a system of regional entities; but as these bodies had advisory capabilities but little final authority, this arrangement proved insufficient as well. So in January 1943, the board announced the establishment of twelve Regional War Labor Boards, which were tripartite replicas of the national board and which could determine settlements for both voluntary and dispute cases.

Each regional board had four divisions: a wage stabilization division, a disputes division, a legal division, and a division of administrative management. The public members of these boards were usually chosen from the fields of the law, academia, and the civil service. The regional boards were responsible for much of the enforcement of national board decisions.

The regions that handled the most cases during the war were those located in Chicago, New York, and Cleveland, each of which dealt with over 1,000 cases. The large majority of decisions were reached not by the national board but by the regional boards, or the panels and commissions. However, decisions of the regional boards and commissions and panels could be appealed to the national board.

Regional Boards, March 1943
Region	Headquarters	Jurisdiction
I	Boston	Mass., Conn., Maine, N.H., R.I., Vt.
II	New York	N.Y., N.J. (northern)
III	Philadelphia	Pa., Del., D.C., Md., N.J. (southern)†
IV	Atlanta	Ga., Ala., Fla., Miss., N.C., S.C., Tenn., Va.
V	Cleveland	Ohio, Ky., W. Va.
VI	Chicago	Ill., Ind., Minn., N. Dak., S. Dak., Wis.
VII	Kansas City	Mo., Ark., Iowa, Kans., Nebr.
VIII	Dallas	Tex., La., Okla.
IX	Denver	Colo., Idaho, Mont., N. Mex., Utah, Wyo.
X	San Francisco	Calif., Ariz., Nev.
XI	Detroit	Mich.
XII	Seattle	Wash., Oreg., Alaska (territory)
‡	Honolulu	Hawaii (territory)

† Southern New Jersey was transferred from Region II to III shortly after creation
‡ Territorial War Labor Board for Hawaii, established June 1944

Table uses traditional abbreviations for states.

== Commissions and panels ==
The national board was further decentralized starting in late 1942, when it established special commissions and panels to deal with specific industries on a national, rather than regional, basis. Like the regions, the commissions and panels also adopted the national board's tripartite structure. These entities included the following:

Commissions and panels
Name	Year created	Notes
Metropolitan Milk Distributors Commission	1942	Region II only; replaced by special representative in 1943
West Coast Lumber Commission	1942	
Nonferrous Metals Commission	1942	
Detroit Tool and Die Commission	1942	Region XI only
Trucking Commission	1942	
Shipbuilding Commission	1943	
Newspaper Printing and Publishing Panel	1943	became Commission in 1944
West Coast Aircraft Committee	1943	subsumed into National Airframe Panel during 1945
Automotive Section	1943	Region XI only
War Shipping Panel	1943	
National Airframe Panel	1944	
National Telephone Panel	1944	became Commission in 1945
Meat Packing Commission	1945	
Steel Commission	1945	
Northern Textile Commission	1945	
Southern Textile Commission	1945	

The difference between the two kinds of entities was that commissions were empowered to make final decisions, subject only to possible review by the national board, whereas panels could only make recommendations to the national board or regional boards. The commissions that handled the most cases during the war were those for West Coast Lumber, Trucking, and Tool and Die.

Separately, disputes or voluntary wage increase cases involving the building and construction industry were not handled by the NWLB at all, but instead were referred to the Wage Adjustment Board for the Building Industry, an entity that was part of the Department of Labor. This was because construction work is fundamentally different regarding industrial relations, in that the sites of work are constantly changing, each particular job has a short duration, and workers typically do not remain with contractors on an extended basis. There was some overlap in regulations and administrative procedures between the Wage Adjustment Board and the NWLB, however, with some conflicts arising between the two bodies as a result.

Finally, wage cases involving federal employees were typically handled by those particular federal agencies, who would periodically submit reports of their decisions to the NWLB.

== Staff ==
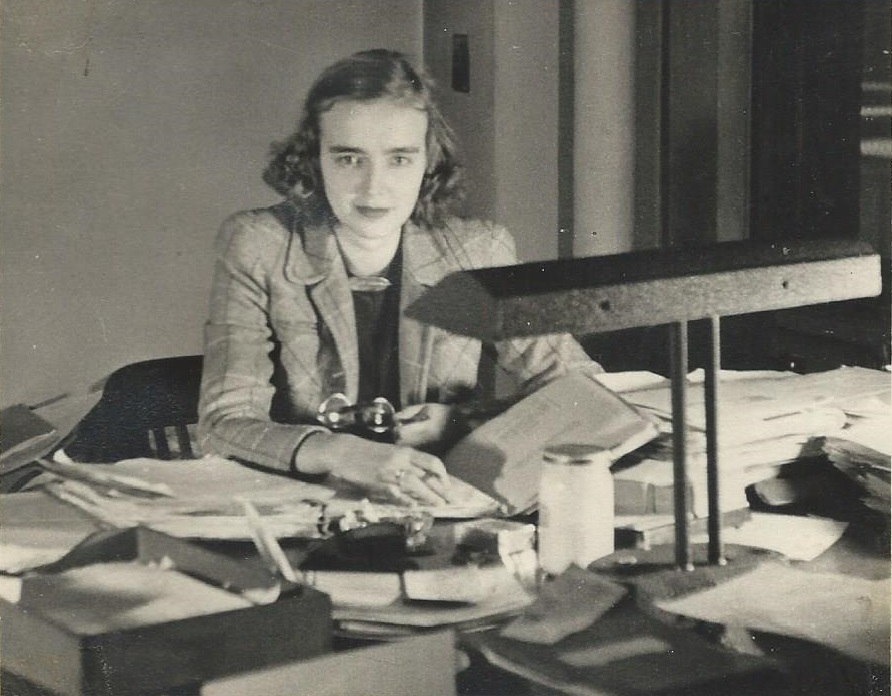
Jane P. Metzger, a review officer for the War Labor Board, sitting at her desk at the Region V offices in Cleveland, Ohio, in late 1944 or 1945. Metzger would subsequently engage in scholarly research regarding the social and public impact of the post-war wave of strikes.

In the beginning of the War Labor Board's existence, when it was staffed only in Washington, D.C. and its work was limited to settling disputes filed with it, the board had fewer than 100 employees. By 1944, the War Labor Board had over 2,400 employees. The board reached its peak staffing level in mid-1945, when it had 2,613 full-time employees. In addition, at that peak the board's staff included close to 2,000 others who were either part-time, and paid on a per diem basis, or were on an unpaid basis. Similarly, the necessary appropriations level for the board rose during the war; for the government fiscal year 1945, it was estimated at $15,596,000 (equivalent to $278,912,000 in 2025).

The people hired were for the professional staff were mostly economists or those in other social sciences. The NWLB also heavily raided the National Labor Relations Board for staff, in the process significantly hindering the other agency's operations.

Many male staff members of the war agency boards ended up getting drafted into military service. The board had difficulty in recruiting professional staff for that reason, and also because there were few people with experience in industrial relations or with wage stabilization. The economist Jean Trepp McKelvey worked for the War Labor Board as a hearing officer and arbitrator; working in Region II, she later recalled the experience there as enabling her to learn much about the world of contracts and collective bargaining. Following the war's conclusion, she became a founding faculty member of the School of Industrial and Labor Relations at Cornell University and a pioneer in women acting as arbitrators.

Black Americans found large-scale employment in the U.S. federal government as a consequence of the needs of the government and the policy of the Roosevelt administration, which declared in Executive Order 8802 in 1941 that there be no discrimination in hiring. The War Labor Board did not hire as many black workers as some government agencies did, with a 5½ percent black workforce compared to 12 percent for war agencies overall. However, those black employees that were hired were present across the nation, not just in Washington, D.C., and relatively few were in traditional custodial duties, with most of the black workers either being in either professional or clerical capacities. As a consequence, as stated in an article in the journal Phylon, the War Labor Board was one of the war agencies that enabled black workers to make important occupational gains.

A fair number of the professional staff of the War Labor Board went into academic fields following the end of the war.

== End and aftermath ==
Once the war ended with V-J Day in August 1945, labor unions lost interest in maintaining the no-strike pledge. The power of the War Labor Board quickly ebbed, and all sides – labor, industry, and the board members themselves – agreed that the board should wrap up its operations as soon as possible.

Accordingly, Roosevelt's successor, Harry S. Truman, issued Executive Order 9672, ceasing operations of the National War Labor Board on December 31, 1945.

Labor disputes were thereafter arbitrated by the National Labor Relations Board, a predecessor agency that had been set up in 1935 and had gone through various ups and downs before the war.

The end of the war saw rising inflation and the so-called strike wave of 1945–1946. The wave began just two weeks after V-J Day, as unions were no longer bound by their pledge to not engage in strikes. Unions had been gaining strength before the war, a strength that in some ways had been frozen while the War Labor Board adjudicated wage matters, and now that strength was seeking to reassert itself with demands for pay increases of up to 50 percent. Unions were also seeking to have a greater say in management decisions regarding certain aspects of how businesses were run. Over the next year there were some 5,000 different strikes involving around 5 million workers, impacting a number of key industrial and consumer sectors of the economy. The strikes were front-page news as almost every major industry was involved.

The strike wave led to passage of the Taft–Hartley Act of 1947, which modified the Wagner Act and introduced various measures that restricted the activities and power of unions.

== Legacy ==
""[All things] considered, the War Labor Board carried out its assignment well. How, in the light of manifold cross purposes impinging upon it, the Board managed to do so is not a simple question. The basic answer, I believe, is that, in spite of all of the pulling, pushing, snorting, and pounding which enlivened its course, all elements of the Board were powerfully propelled by a deep sense of devotion to a country which even in wartime permitted such an untrammeled performance in handling labor disputes, instead of committing them to the much more tidy disposition of a dictatorship. At any rate, labor disputes which would cripple war production were prevented and wages were kept relatively stable. These were the major objectives of the War Labor Board."

— Dexter Merriam Keezer, public member of the board, 1946

The scope of the board was much greater than its World War I equivalent. Indeed, by January 1945, the board – together with its National Defense Mediation Board predecessor – had already made ten times the number of decisions as its earlier incarnation.

Other federal agencies had an all-public composition, but because the no-strike, no-lockout pledge meant that voluntary cooperation was essential in resolving disputes, the War Labor Board's inclusion of labor and industry representatives in a tripartite arrangement proved to be a valuable structural element.

The National War Labor Board had a major impact upon the direction of industrial relations in the United States, both during World War II and after it. Indeed, even as the war was still going on and the board still active, there were academic articles being published regarding what the post-war effects of the board might be.

The War Labor Board's "maintenance of membership" determination, and especially the automatic checkoff of union dues that was part of it, significantly helped labor union finances during the war and in particular helped the various CIO unions grow in size. Total dues-paying membership in all unions increased from around 9 million before the war to 14 million or so at the end of it.

The National War Labor Board did not completely prevent strikes and other work stoppages from happening during the war, and indeed they rose during the last two years of the conflict. Nor could they prevent wage rates from significantly increasing, as the immense war production contracts being let out by the government inevitably caused a competition for labor resources. There was also more work being done during the war, with the average for regular employees rising from 38 hours per week in 1940 to 45 hours in 1944 (it would fall back to 39 hours per week by the end of the 1940s). Public opinion polls taken during 1941–45 showed that while some 7–15 percent of the public felt that there were "bad things" that unions did, only 4–6 percent felt that unions had interfered in war production.

The trend started during the war due to the Little Steel formula's control over wage increases, that of fringe benefits being considered a valuable thing for employees to get aside from actual wages, continued after it. Even though the power of unions was somewhat constrained by the post-war Taft-Hartley Act, over the next few decades unions gained a considerable number of new benefits, including those related to healthcare, pensions, and unemployment insurance.

== Members ==
Members of the National War Labor Board, January 1942
Public Representatives	Labor Representatives	Industry Representatives
William Hammatt Davis, former head of National Defense Mediation Board (chair)	Matthew Woll, AFL vice president	Walter Teagle, chairman of Standard Oil
George W. Taylor, University of Pennsylvania economics professor (vice chair)	George Meany, AFL secretary-treasurer	Roger Lapham, chairman of American-Hawaiian Steamship
Frank Graham, president of the University of North Carolina	R. J. Thomas, president of CIO's United Auto Workers	Albert W. Hawkes, chairman of Congoleum-Nairn
Wayne Morse, dean of the University of Oregon Law School	Thomas Kennedy, secretary-treasurer of CIO's United Mine Workers	Edward J. McMillan, president of Standard Knitting Mills

Over the course of the board's existence, there was some turnover in membership, especially during the latter parts of 1945. Davis stepped down as chair in March 1945 and was succeeded by Taylor, who in turn stepped down in October 1945 and was succeeded by Lloyd K. Garrison, dean of the University of Wisconsin Law School, who had joined the board the previous year and held the chair through the board's end. Public members of note who joined during 1945 included Dexter Merriam Keezer, economist and president of Reed College; Edwin E. Witte, professor of economics, University of Wisconsin; Nathan P. Feinsinger, professor of law, University of Wisconsin; and W. Willard Wirtz, professor of law, Northwestern University.

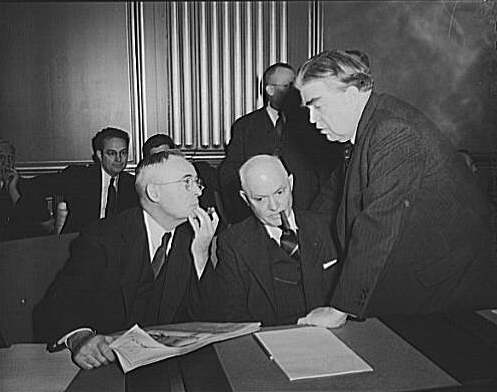
War Labor Board member Thomas Kennedy (left) conferring with United Mine Workers leader John L. Lewis (right) at a January 1943 board meeting

Turnover was most pronounced among the industry representatives, with sixteen different people being members at one time or another. They included Cyrus S. Ching, vice president at U.S. Rubber Co., and Reuben B. Robertson Jr., vice president at Champion Fiber & Paper Co. Contrariwise, there was only one change in labor membership during this entire time. This was when Van A. Bittner, assistant to the president at the United Steel Workers, succeeded Thomas Kennedy, who had resigned in April 1943 due to unhappiness with the Little Steel formula and other board policies regarding wages.

In addition to the regular members of the board, there were alternate members, associate members, and substitute members, some of whom later became regular members when a vacancy needed filling. In addition, the chairs of the regional boards for each of Regions II, III, and V ended up being selected for regular public membership on the national board, with the attorney Theodore W. Kheel being the one from Region II.

Garrison, with the help of the two prior chairs, oversaw the preparation of an extensive multi-volume termination report for the agency, delivered in 1947.

== See also ==
- National War Labor Board (1918–1919)
- United States home front during World War II

== Cited bibliography ==
- Atleson, James B. (1998). Labor and the Wartime State: Labor Relations and Law During World War II. Urbana and Chicago: University of Illinois Press. ISBN 0-252-06674-X.
- Burns, James MacGregor (1956). Roosevelt: The Lion and the Fox. New York: Harcourt, Brace and Company.
- Burns, James MacGregor (1970). Roosevelt: The Soldier of Freedom. New York: Harcourt Brace Jovanovich. ISBN 0-15-178871-5.
- Chamberlain, Neil W. (1953). Social Responsibility and Strikes. New York: Harper & Brothers. Assisted by Jane Metzger Schilling.
- Chamberlain, Neil W.; Schilling, Jane Metzger (1954). The Impact of Strikes: Their Economic and Social Costs. New York: Harper & Brothers.
- Chamberlain, Neil W. (1996). Intellectual Odyssey: An Economist's Ideological Journey. Raleigh, North Carolina: Pentland Press.
- Davis, John A.; Golightly, Cornelius L. (1945). "Negro Employment in the Federal Government". Phylon. 6 (4): 337–346. doi:10.2307/271380. JSTOR 271380.
- Dixon, Robert G. (1949). "Tripartitism in the National War Labor Board". Industrial and Labor Relations Review. 2 (3): 372–390. doi:10.2307/2519075. JSTOR 2519075.
- Dunlop, John T; Hill, Arthur D. (1950). The Wage Adjustment Board: Wartime Stabilization in the Building and Construction Industry. Cambridge, Massachusetts: Harvard University Press.
- Fisher, Paul (August 1945). "The National War Labor Board and Postwar Industrial Relations". The Quarterly Journal of Economics. 59 (4): 483–523. doi:10.2307/1883293. JSTOR 1883293.
- Galbraith, John Kenneth (1973). Economics and the Public Purpose. Boston: Houghton Mifflin Company.
- Gross, James A. (1981). Reshaping of the National Labor Relations Board: A Study in Economics, Politics, and the Law. Albany: SUNY Press.
- Keezer, Dexter Merriam (June 1946). "Observations on the Operations of the National War Labor Board". The American Economic Review. 36 (3): 233–257. JSTOR 1801835.
- Lichtenstein, Nelson (1982). Labor's War at Home: The CIO in World War II. Cambridge: Cambridge University Press. ISBN 978-0-521-23472-6.
- Richards, Allan R. (February 1952). "Tripartitism and Regional War Labor Boards". The Journal of Politics. 14 (1): 72–103. doi:10.2307/2126389. JSTOR 2126389. S2CID 154971632.
- Samuelson, Paul A. (1970). Economics (8th ed.). New York: McGraw-Hill.
- Schumann, Richard E. (September 2001). "Compensation from World War II through the Great Society". Monthly Labor Review.
- Seidman, Joel (1953). American Labor from Defense to Reconversion. Chicago: University of Chicago Press.
- The Termination Report of the National War Labor Board: Industrial Disputes and Wage Stabiliation During Wartime, January 12, 1942—December 31, 1945. Washington, D.C.: U.S. Government Printing Office. 1947. In three volumes: Volume I, Volume II, Volume III.
- Workman, Andrew A. (2000). "Creating the National War Labor Board: Franklin Roosevelt and the Politics of State Building in the Early 1940s". Journal of Policy History. 12 (2): 233–264. doi:10.1353/jph.2000.0016. S2CID 154322958.
