= Cyrus S. Ching =

Canadian-American industrialist and civil servant (1876–1967)

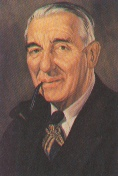
- Born: May 21, 1876; Prince Edward Island, Canada
- Died: December 27, 1967 (aged 91); Washington DC
- Occupations: US industrialist, federal civil servant, noted trade union mediator
- Known for: He was the first director of the Federal Mediation and Conciliation Service (FMCS) and the Wage Stabilization Board.

Cyrus S. Ching (May 21, 1876 – December 27, 1967) was a Canadian-American who became an American industrialist, federal civil servant, and noted labor union mediator. He was the first director of the Federal Mediation and Conciliation Service (FMCS) and the Wage Stabilization Board.

== Early life ==
Ching was born on his father's farm in Prince Edward Island, Canada on May 21, 1876. The Chings were of Welsh heritage (the family name was originally spelled Chynge). He was the only boy in a family with eight children.

Ching was educated in a one-room schoolhouse. When he was 16, he was a spectator in a local courtroom, and the experience inspired him to become a lawyer. He attended Prince of Wales College, a college preparatory academy, after a well-off uncle paid for his high school education. He transferred to a local business college and studied bookkeeping and stenography. In 1895, he left Prince Edward Island to work for an Albertan grain elevator company.

On October 31, 1899, Ching moved to Boston, Massachusetts, and took a job as a clerk with the West End Street Railway. He became an instructor, teaching motormen how to operate the new elevated rail cars. In 1901, Ching was nearly electrocuted on the job while repairing a rail car. Although he was expected to be blind and his face heavily scarred for life, he left the hospital after two months with only minimal scar damage to his hands. Since Massachusetts had yet to enact worker's compensation protection, Ching was fired by the company during his hospitalization. Afterward, however, the company rehired him—this time as a manager, training motormen on the city's streetcars.

Ching became a naturalized American citizen in 1909. In 1912, he obtained his law degree from the Evening Institute for Younger Men (now Northeastern University). The same year, he married the former Anna MacIntosh. After her death, Ching married Mildred Vergosen.

== Industrial relations career ==
While working for the public transit system, Ching witnessed the 1912 Boston streetcar strike. Ching had warned management that 11 years of frozen wages, lack of communication and general disregard for workers' issues would lead to a strike. Management refused to heed his warnings. In June 1912, the Amalgamated Association of Street Car Employees struck the transit system. The Mayor of Boston, John "Honey Fitz" Fitzgerald, and the Governor of Massachusetts, Eugene Foss, accused the president of the company of bribing state legislators to obtain favorable treatment. The president resigned, leading to an end to the strike in August 1912. The system's new president appointed Ching as company negotiator. Ching promised to end the use of management spies, which quickly led to a labor agreement. When the American Federation of Labor (AFL) forced the Amalgamated to give up jurisdiction over 34 separate job titles to various craft unions, Ching consented to the change—and negotiated another 34 labor contracts.

When the United States entered World War I in 1918, Ching attempted to enlist but was turned down because the military refused to induct anyone taller than 6'4" (Ching was 6'7"). Rather than continue to work for the transit company, Ching went to work for the United States Rubber Company in 1919 as director of industrial relations. U.S. Rubber had 34 subsidiary units, most of which were independent. When employees assisted by the Industrial Workers of the World (IWW) engaged in a recognition strike at the company's Dominion Rubber unit in Montreal, Ching convinced both Dominion and U.S. Rubber officials to agree to binding arbitration. The workers subsequently rejected the IWW in favor of affiliating with the AFL. Ching later secured company acquiescence in the formation of workers' councils in every U.S. Rubber factory. Yet Ching opposed widespread unionization of U.S. Rubber due to the AFL's insistence on craft unionism.

Unions began forming in the American rubber industry after passage of the National Industrial Recovery Act in June 1933. Goodyear, B. F. Goodrich, and Firestone all were quickly organized by the AFL. But workers at U.S. Rubber remained by and large satisfied with working conditions, and unionization made little inroad among company employees. Ching, however, saw unionization coming. Although the United Rubber Workers (URW) had made few inroads among the company's workers, Ching met with URW and Congress of Industrial Organizations (CIO) organizers and arranged for card check elections at U.S. Rubber factories. Unionization of the company proceeded without the acrimony observed at other rubber manufacturers, and contracts were quickly signed.

== Federal service ==
Ching's career as a mediator began in 1941. William S. Knudsen, chairman of the National Defense Advisory Commission, asked Ching to mediate a dispute at a Bethlehem Steel factory in upstate New York. When the union struck in February 1941, Bethlehem Steel executives demanded that the governor crush the strike using the New York Army National Guard. Ching not only refused to ask for military intervention, he demanded that Bethlehem Steel executives meet with him in Washington, D.C. At a meeting a few days later, Ching surprised the company by having Philip Murray, president of the United Steelworkers of America, and Sidney Hillman, associate director of the Office of Production Management and a former CIO leader, at the meeting. Ching had won Murray's consent to a quick election at the plant. When the employer claimed the union effort was led by a mere handful of agitators, Ching demanded that the company prove its claim by holding a snap National Labor Relations Board election. Management, its bluff called, reluctantly agreed. An election was held 10 days later which the union won by a vote of 75 percent to 25 percent. The strike ended, and a contract was signed.

President Franklin D. Roosevelt named Ching to the National Defense Mediation Board (NDMB) in early 1941. The Board collapsed shortly before the attack on Pearl Harbor after Ching and a majority of the Board's members voted against imposing the union shop on the "captive mines". A later panel overturned the ruling in 1942, but Ching continued to espouse a philosophy of consensual collective bargaining rather than government imposition in employer-union relations.

President Roosevelt then named Ching to the War Labor Board, the NDMB's successor. He served from February 1942 to September 1943, then returned to U.S. Rubber. Ching retired from the company in August 1947.

Passage of the Taft-Hartley Act over President Harry S. Truman's veto on June 23, 1947, established the Federal Mediation and Conciliation Service as an independent agency. John R. Steelman, Assistant to the President of the United States (the office later became the White House Chief of Staff), asked Ching to head up the new agency. Ching initially refused, but Truman himself asked Ching to direct the new agency in order to forestall congressional opposition to funding the new agency. Ching served until the end of the Truman administration. During his time in office, Ching advised Truman to invoke the Taft-Hartley Act during a strike at the Oak Ridge National Laboratory in December 1947, and mediated several important strikes—including the 1949 steel strike, the 1949 Hawaii dockworkers' strike, and several coal strikes. He also spent much of his time fighting off attempts to put FMCS back under the authority of the United States Department of Labor.

Ching is said to have popularized the famous quote about the downside of wrestling with pigs:

“A man in the audience began heckling him with a long series of nasty and irrelevant questions. For a while Ching answered patiently. Finally he held up his big paw and waggled it gently. ‘My friend,’ he said, ‘I’m not going to answer any more of your questions. I hope you won’t take this personally, but I am reminded of something my old uncle told me, long ago, back on the farm. He said. ‘What’s the sense of wrestling with a pig? You both get all over muddy . . . and the pig likes it.'”

Ching took a leave of absence from FMCS in October 1950 to head the Wage Stabilization Board, a Korean War-era agency created in September 1950 to limit wage increases and help stabilize the economy as defense mobilization ramped upward. He was the agency's first director. He quit the Board in April 1951 when President Truman reconstituted the panel, and returned to FMCS.

After departing FMCS in September 1952, President Dwight Eisenhower asked Ching to lead a panel which would arbitrate labor disputes at Oak Ridge. Ching agreed, and remained head of the arbitration panel until his death.

== Retirement, honors, death ==
Cyrus Ching published his memoirs, Review and Reflection: A Half Century of Labor Relations, in 1953. He received an honorary degree from Bowdoin College the same year. A partial scholarship was endowed in 1956 in honor of Ching at the Cornell University School of Industrial and Labor Relations.

In 1961, the Dept. of Labor presented Ching with its Award of Merit for his service in labor-management relations.

Ching died at his home in Washington, D.C., of a heart attack on December 27, 1967. At his death, AFL-CIO president George Meany noted, "He contributed as much to the cause of industrial peace and labor-management understanding as any man of his generation."

Ching was inducted into the Labor Department's Labor Hall of Honor in 1989.
