= George W. Taylor (professor) =

American economist

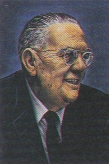
- George W. Taylor
- Born: July 10, 1901; Philadelphia, Pennsylvania, U.S.
- Died: December 15, 1972 (aged 71); Philadelphia, Pennsylvania, U.S.
- Education: University of Pennsylvania; Wharton School of Business
- Occupations: Professor; Public Service Chairperson
- Employers: Albright College; Wharton School of Business; National Recovery Administration
- Known for: Industrial Relations Academics; Father of American Arbitration; Labor-Wage Contract Agreements; Little Steel Formula; Taylor Law
- Board member of: National Labor Board; National War Labor Board; Wage Stabilization Board
- Spouse: Edith Ayling
- Awards: Presidential Medal of Freedom

George W. Taylor (July 10, 1901 – December 15, 1972) was a professor of industrial relations at the Wharton School at the University of Pennsylvania, and is credited with founding the academic field of study known as industrial relations. He served in several capacities in the federal government, most notably as a mediator and arbitrator. During his career, Taylor settled more than 2,000 strikes.

In 1967, he helped draft the New York state civil service law which legalized collective bargaining in that state but which also banned strikes by public employees—legislation widely known today as the Taylor Law.

== Early life ==
Taylor was born in the Kensington industrial neighborhood of Philadelphia, Pennsylvania, on July 10, 1901. His uncle owned a textile mill, and his father, Harry Taylor, was a superintendent at a hosiery mill. He graduated from Frankford High School in 1919. Taylor intended to go into the mills after graduating from high school, but his high school principal persuaded him to attend college instead.

In 1921, Taylor graduated with a bachelor's degree in economics from the Wharton School. His senior thesis was on the history and overdevelopment of the hosiery industry in Pennsylvania. He became a professor in the department of business administration at Albright College, and obtained his doctorate in economics from the Wharton School in 1929.

The Hemline index theory is often erroneously attributed to Taylor. It is a misunderstanding of his findings from his 1929 thesis Significant post-war changes in the full-fashioned hosiery industry.

== Academic career ==
In 1930, Taylor received an appointment as an assistant professor at his alma mater, the Wharton School. In his first years as a professor at Wharton, Taylor founded the academic field of industrial relations, which covered labor arbitration, mediation, and other forms of alternative dispute resolution. In his lifetime, he became known as the "Father of American Arbitration."

Teaching was Taylor's first love throughout his life. He often said that he "had chalk in his veins" and hated to leave the classroom. He was recognized as a dynamic speaker and excellent lecturer, and remained a highly sought-after public speaker even at the time of his death.

Taylor was named a full professor in 1944, and was eventually named to the Gaylord P. and Mary Louise Harnwell Professor of Industry. Upon his retirement from active teaching in 1964, the University of Pennsylvania named the endowed chair after him. He continued to lecture and speak to students on campus until his death in 1972.

== Industrial relations career ==
In 1928, Taylor received his first commission as an industrial relations specialist. His thesis on the hosiery industry in Pennsylvania led Emil Rieve, president of a Pennsylvania hosiery workers' union, to seek his help as an umpire in an organizing dispute. In 1929, he settled his first strike, at the Aberle Hosiery Mill near Reading, Pennsylvania.

Taylor received national acclaim for helping mediate an end to a strike at Apex Hosiery in Philadelphia in 1932. Under the terms of the 1931 collective bargaining agreement between the Full Fashioned Hosiery Manufacturers of America and the American Federation of Hosiery Workers, he was appointed "impartial chairman" for the independent arbitration committee established by the contract. The position became a model for similar collective bargaining clauses nationwide. During his 10 years as impartial chairman, Taylor established a national minimum wage in the hosiery industry.

In 1935, after a period of service to the federal government, Taylor become impartial chairman for a labor arbitration committee established by the Men's Clothing Manufacturers' Association and the Amalgamated Clothing Workers of America. He held that position until 1961.

By 1940, Taylor had settled roughly 1,400 labor disputes without a strike.

In 1941, Taylor served as an impartial arbitrator between the United Auto Workers (UAW) and General Motors. During this time, he became close with UAW president Walter Reuther.

Taylor entered federal service again in 1951. He left it in 1952, and although he continued to teach at the Wharton School he also was the official arbitrator of internal Congress of Industrial Organizations (CIO) jurisdictional disputes. He served in this capacity for three years, and his work became a model for handling inter-union disputes after the American Federation of Labor (AFL) and CIO merged in 1955.

During his lifetime, Taylor was credited with coining a number of common collective bargaining terms, including "tandem," "escalator clause," "productivity improvement," "interplant inequity," and "ability to pay."

Taylor was a strong advocate of private sector collective bargaining, but believed that governments had the right to significantly restrict collective bargaining and the right to strike in the public sector. He was a strong advocate of the National Labor Relations Act, and vehemently condemned the Taft-Hartley Act as poor public policy and an improper restriction on the right to strike. In many important labor disputes, however, Taylor often took positions opposed to those advocated by labor unions because Taylor believed strikes should serve the public and not a private good. As he once noted:

There is too much talk about the right to strike and too little about the purpose of strikes and whether they serve their purpose. But what really is thrilling is when representatives of labor and management finally come to an agreement and realize the immense satisfaction of having created order out of conflict. I think that's the essence of democracy.

== Public service ==
In 1933, Taylor was appointed chairman for the Philadelphia regional office of the National Labor Board. Later that year, President Franklin D. Roosevelt appointed him assistant deputy administrator of the National Recovery Administration. Taylor left federal service in 1935, although he continued to serve as an advisor to the Fair Labor Standards Administration throughout the 1930s.

President Roosevelt appointed Taylor vice chairman of the National War Labor Board in 1942. He became the board's chairman in 1945. In July 1942, Taylor wrote the wage decision popularly known as the "Little Steel formula" which gave workers employed by smaller steel companies only modest pay increases for the duration of the war. The board applied the "Little Steel formula" to nearly every American industry during World War II. The decision was severely criticized by organized labor, but Taylor considered it to be one of the most significant, well-written, and well-founded policy decisions he ever made.

President Harry S. Truman named Taylor secretary of the National Labor-Management Conference in 1946. The same year, Truman appointed Taylor chairman of the advisory board of the Office of War Mobilization and Reconversion. Taylor also served as a consultant to the Commission on Reorganization of the Executive Branch from 1948 to 1949.

In 1951, Truman appointed Taylor director of the Wage Stabilization Board.

During the steel strike of 1959, President Dwight Eisenhower appointed Taylor chairman of the Presidential Board of Inquiry created when Eisenhower invoked the cooling-off provisions of the Taft-Hartley Act. Despite Taylor's role in helping Eisenhower win a court injunction stopping the strike for 90s days, Taylor became involved in helping end the strike. He assisted United Steelworkers of America counsel Arthur Goldberg and Kaiser Steel heir Edgar Kaiser negotiate an agreement which later formed the basis for the national collective bargaining agreement which settled the strike.

In 1961, President John F. Kennedy appointed Taylor to the President's Advisory Committee on Labor Management Policy. During his tenure on the committee, Taylor helped craft a long-term contractual solution to a series of wildcat strikes which had plagued the aerospace industry since World War II. Taylor also resolved railroad disputes in 1964 and 1967, and in 1968 settled the long-running copper mining strike.

In 1961, Taylor led a commission appointed by New York City Mayor Robert F. Wagner, Jr. which crafted a settlement that led to collective bargaining for teachers in New York City. The subsequent election led to the founding of the United Federation of Teachers (UFT). In 1965, Taylor led a fact-finding board which the UFT used to win its first collective bargaining agreement with the city.

But Taylor's most famous (and, according to New York state labor leaders, notorious) act as a public official was his role in crafting New York's "Taylor Law." In the wake of the formation of the UFT and (more immediately) a 1966 New York City transit strike, Governor Nelson Rockefeller appointed a Committee on Public Employment Relations to study the state's public employee collective bargaining laws. Taylor led the other five members of the panel in proposing new legislation which gave New York's public employees significantly stronger collective bargaining rights. On April 25, 1967, Gov. Rockefeller signed the Public Employees Fair Employment Act into law. Popularly known as the "Taylor Law," the Act is considered a model for public sector labor legislation. The law established collective bargaining rights for state-employed workers, and set up procedures and mechanisms for county and local public workers to establish unions and bargain collectively.

Two aspects of the law, however, drew harsh criticism from organized labor. Section 210 prohibits public employees from striking, and fines the union double the amount of each striking employee's salary for each day the strike lasts. Section 201, Part 4, of the law prohibits employers from negotiating benefits provided by a public retirement fund or providing income to public sector retirees.

== Personal life and honors ==
President Lyndon B. Johnson awarded Taylor the Presidential Medal of Freedom on December 3, 1963.

On January 5, 1995, Taylor was inducted into the U.S. Department of Labor Labor Hall of Fame for his contributions to industrial relations.

During his life, Taylor became close friends with many of the most important labor and government officials of his day: Frances Perkins, Cyrus Ching, George Meany, Philip Murray, Clark Kerr, Walter Heller, Henry J. Kaiser, John L. Lewis, George Shultz, John Dunlop and W. Willard Wirtz.

Taylor retired from the Wharton School in 1971. He died at his home in Philadelphia on the evening of December 15, 1972. He was survived by his wife, the former Edith Ayling; he had no children.

== See also ==
- Taylor Law
- "George W Taylor". JSTOR.
