= Steve Young (police officer) =

American police officer (1953–2003)

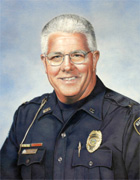
- Born: Kermit Steven Young; January 6, 1953; Upper Sandusky, Ohio, U.S.
- Died: January 9, 2003 (aged 50); Ohio, U.S.
- Police career
- Department: Marion, Ohio

Steve Young (January 6, 1953 – January 9, 2003) was national president of the Fraternal Order of Police in 2001.

== Early life ==
Born Kermit Steven Young on January 26, 1953, in Upper Sandusky, Ohio. He was a Lieutenant with the Marion Police Department in Marion, Ohio.

== Career ==
Young started both his FOP and police careers in 1976 with the Marion Police Department. He served as the state FOP president from 1988 to 1999 and was elected national president in 2001, when he received unanimous support after he ran unopposed.

Young also served on state and national committees, including President George W. Bush's Homeland Security Committee to which he was appointed in 2002.

He was inducted into the Department of Labor Hall of Honor in 2003.

== Death ==
Young died of cancer on January 9, 2003, at the age of 50.
