= National Defense Mediation Board =

US government agency

Agency overview
- Formed: March 19, 1941
- Dissolved: January 12, 1942
- Superseding agency: National War Labor Board
- Jurisdiction: Federal government of the United States
- Headquarters: Washington, D.C.
- Agency executives: Clarence A. Dykstra, chair; William H. Davis, chair
- Parent agency: Office for Emergency Management

The National Defense Mediation Board (NDMB) was a United States federal agency established by Executive Order 8716 on March 19, 1941, that settled disputes between labor and management during the prewar defense period. The executive order established the NDMB as a tripartite agency of eleven representatives, four each from labor and industry and three from the public. The order vested in the agency the power to “exert every possible effort to assure that all work necessary for national defense shall proceed without interruption and with all possible speed.” The Board could use either mediation or voluntary arbitration to resolve disputes between management and labor in defense industries. If these methods failed, the Board was empowered to investigate controversies, conduct fact-finding, and formulate recommendations. During the ten months of its existence, the Board received a total of 118 cases of labor disputes. Since strikes were usually in progress when the Board received its cases, the NDMB's basic policy was to persuade unions to call off strikes in return for wage retroactivity and a promise of a hearing. This was successful in most cases, but, in the rare instances when parties did not heed Board recommendations, the Board forwarded matters to the White House. The NDMB ultimately collapsed because of a dispute involving the “captive mines,” during which the Board refused to grant union shop to the United Mine Workers (UMW). On January 12, 1942, the National Defense Mediation Board was superseded by the National War Labor Board.

== History and creation ==
The NDMB was created largely in response to the high incidence of strikes during the defense-related production boom, which began in 1940. In 1941, more than two million workers participated in more than 4,000 work stoppages, some of which directly disturbed defense production. In response, several antistrike bills were pending in Congress. Sidney Hillman, a member of the National Defense Advisory Commission, recommended a tripartite mediation board to President Franklin D. Roosevelt because it might be more acceptable to union leaders than antistrike legislation. Although the American Federation of Labor (AFL) quickly endorsed the proposal, labor's second major arm, the Congress of Industrial Organizations (CIO), was reluctant to support the creation of the tripartite board. CIO's president, Philip Murray, realized that in preventing and ending strikes, the mediation board would “find its attention directed against labor in order to maintain the status quo.” Nevertheless, Murray did not oppose the proposal. Shortly thereafter, President Roosevelt issued an executive order creating the NDMB.

== Power and policies ==
The powers of the NDMB were severely limited by its inability to issue “directive orders” with regard to labor disputes. Under Roosevelt's executive order, only the secretary of labor could certify the NDMB to rule on disputes threatening defense production. Such certification only occurred during disputes that the U.S. Conciliation Service could not resolve. Thus, partly because of its inability to render final decision, the NDMB emphasized collective bargaining and voluntarism, rather than federal determination, in settling labor disputes. In the two cases where voluntary arbitration and mediation had failed and management refused to accept Board recommendations, the president seized the plants by executive order. Therefore, although the NDMB was often criticized for lacking formal powers of arbitration, the threat of governmental seizure and public pressure to comply with its recommendations gave the Board substantial authority in dispute mediation.

The Defense Mediation Board also established precedents in union security agreements. Union security agreements are contracts between labor and industry that determine to what extent unions may compel employees to join unions as a requirement for working. As James B. Atleson writes, mediation is a difficult model to apply unless parties can reach a compromise on conceptual principles. Thus arose the need for the NDMB to create common ground between labor and industry on union security. The NDMB enacted the “maintenance of membership clause,” a compromise between labor and management that would be adopted by its successor, the National War Labor Board. Under the clause, employees who were already union members were required to maintain membership with the union for the life of the contract. Because employees were not forced to join unions, the policy prevented a closed shop but also avoided the complete disintegration of unions in the wartime economy.

== Collapse ==
The NDMB successfully mediated labor disputes for eight months but broke down during the “captive mines” conflict between the steel industry and the United Mine Workers. At the heart of the conflict were labor's demands for union shop in the commercial mines. After the UMW called out 50,000 miners in its first strike, the NDMB convinced workers to go back to work while it mediated a settlement. However, these attempts at mediation were unsuccessful, and the UMW called a second strike in spite of Roosevelt's exhortations to not strike again. On November 10, 1941, the NDMB voted nine-to-two against union shop. Two labor members of the NDMB, both from the CIO, resigned from the Board, resulting in its collapse. However, shortly following the attack on Pearl Harbor, President Roosevelt created the National War Labor Board, a similar tripartite agency with expanded powers.
