= Nathan Feinsinger =

American lawyer

Nathan Paul Feinsinger
- Born: September 20, 1902; Brooklyn, New York, United States of America
- Died: November 3, 1983 (aged 81); Glenwood Springs, Colorado, United States of America
- Education: Bachelor's degree, University of Michigan, 1924; Law degree, University of Michigan, 1926 post-graduate study, Columbia Law School
- Occupation: Professor
- Employer: University of Wisconsin Law School
- Spouse: Bettie
- Children: 3

appointed to War Labor Board
- In office 1942–1945

Nathan Paul Feinsinger (September 20, 1902 – November 3, 1983) was a professor of law at the University of Wisconsin Law School. He mediated and arbitrated a number of strikes, and served as general counsel to the Wisconsin Labor Relations Board and associate general counsel to the National War Labor Board (WLB).

Feinsinger is best known for his mediation efforts in the 1944 telephone operators strike, the 1947 pineapple workers strike, the 1952 steel strike, and the 1966 New York City transit worker strike.

== Early life ==
Feinsinger was born in Brooklyn, New York, in 1902 but grew up in Buffalo.

He graduated from the University of Michigan with a bachelor's degree in 1924 and a law degree in 1926.

After post-graduate study at Columbia Law School in New York City, he joined the faculty at the University of Wisconsin School of Law in 1929. During his academic career, he was also a visiting professor of law at numerous other law schools throughout the nation.

== Government service ==
Feinsinger was appointed general counsel to the Wisconsin Labor Relations Board in 1937. He served for two years, during which time he was on leave from the University of Wisconsin.

In 1942, President Franklin D. Roosevelt appointed Feinsinger associate general counsel of the War Labor Board. He was promoted to Director of National Disputes in 1943, overseeing labor problems of a national nature, and was appointed to be a representative of the public on the board in 1945.

During his tenure on the War Labor Board, Feinsinger helped settle a number of important strikes. In November 1944, he settled a national strike by telephone switchboard operators belonging to the National Federation of Telephone Workers which had shut down telephone service in Washington, D.C., Detroit and other large cities. Feinsinger told the union leaders that they were defying the government of the United States and "no union has done that yet and succeeded." On November 24, telephone workers in Dayton ended their walk-out and the nationwide strike collapsed. President Roosevelt specifically praised Feinsinger for his role in ending the dispute.

President Harry S. Truman appointed Feinsinger to a presidential fact-finding board on December 31, 1945, along with Utah Supreme Court Chief Justice Roger I. McDonough and Missouri Supreme Court Chief Justice James M. Douglas, to investigate an ongoing labor dispute in the steel industry in which 700,000 steelworkers threatened to strike. Although the Feinsinger panel was unable to avert the strike, the fact-finding report helped lead to an eventual settlement of the strike.

After a general strike by maritime workers on the West Coast began in early September 1946, President Truman named Feinsinger as the federal government's chief mediator. The War Labor Board had cut wage increases won through collective bargaining nearly in half, but Feinsinger was able to negotiate an end to the strike which convinced the WLB to restore the cuts.

=== The pineapple strike ===
Feinsinger played a critical role in settling a pineapple strike by Hawaiian workers which began on July 11, 1947. Although the strike only lasted five days, the workers were represented by the relatively militant International Longshore and Warehouse Union—which threatened to close all ports in Hawaii in support of the sugar workers. A lengthy strike would have broken the fragile Hawaiian economy, which was heavily dependent on large shipments of food, fuel and other supplies in order to sustain the large military and civilian defense presence on the island. As Feinsinger himself noted:

This is the toughest case I ever worked on. There was danger that if the strike was not settled this week it would have gone on for months and dragged sugar and the waterfront down with it.

Feinsinger was rushed to Hawaii by a military aircraft and entered into three days of nearly non-stop negotiations. The strike ended on terms favorable to the union on July 16. A grateful Hawaii territorial legislature proclaimed the day the strike ended "Nathan P. Feinsinger Day."

Feinsinger left federal service in 1948. In February 1950, he was involved in an automobile accident in Wisconsin that claimed two lives. The accident shattered his hip, and he required extensive surgery and rehabilitation. But he resumed a heavy schedule of lecturing and teaching by the end of the year.

=== The steel strike ===
President Truman named Feinsinger chairman of the Wage Stabilization Board on August 15, 1951, succeeding George W. Taylor. The board was part of a massive federal wage and price stabilization effort designed to support defense production and mobilization during the Korean War.

Feinsinger faced an immediate wage crisis as unionized steelworkers threatened to strike in order to win wage and productivity increases. Feinsinger convinced United Steelworkers of America president Philip Murray to call off a strike set for January 1, 1952, in favor of a 90-day voluntary cooling-off and fact-finding period. Feinsinger was forced to turn over the wage case to the president for resolution, but continued to work feverishly toward a solution. At 6:30 a.m. on March 20, 1952, Feinsinger collapsed and lapsed into unconsciousness after 15 and a half hours of uninterrupted negotiations. Despite several additional proposed solutions, neither the employers nor the union agreed to a new contract. The steelworkers set their strike to begin on April 9. But at 10:30 p.m. on the evening of April 8, 1952, President Truman invoked his powers as commander-in-chief and seized the steel mills. On June 2, in a landmark decision, the United States Supreme Court ruled in Youngstown Sheet & Tube Co. v. Sawyer, 343 U.S. 579, that the president lacked the authority to seize the steel mills. The steelworkers struck the next day to win their wage increase. The strike lasted 55 days, and ended on July 24 on essentially the same terms the union had proposed four months earlier.

=== New York City transit strike ===
One of his last major roles as a mediator occurred during the 1966 New York City transit strike. Feinsinger was appointed chairman of a three-member mediation panel by Mayor Robert F. Wagner Jr. and Mayor-elect John Lindsay. Although the city won an injunction against the strike and jailed the union's 61-year-old ailing president, Mike Quill, Feinsinger quickly led both sides into a rapid series of give-and-take bargaining sessions which ended the bitter wintertime strike after just 13 days.

== Retirement, death and endowment ==
Throughout his life, Feinsinger mediated strikes and labor disputes in many industries, including steel, automobile manufacturing, maritime trades, meat-packing, airlines and transit industries. In the 1960s, Feinsinger was named an impartial arbitrator by General Motors and the United Auto Workers.

In 1967, Feinsinger founded the Center for Teaching and Research in Disputes Settlement at the University of Wisconsin. He retired from teaching in 1973.

Feinsinger suffered a stroke in May 1982. He died from complications related to the stroke on Wednesday, November 3, 1983, in Glenwood Springs, Colorado. He was survived by his estranged wife, Bettie, and his three children

The Nathan P. Feinsinger Professor of Law chair at the University of Wisconsin Law School was endowed in his name.
