= Labor Hall of Honor =

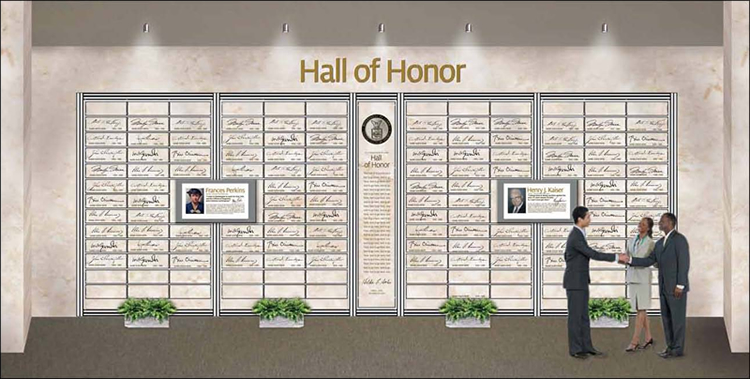
- Labor Hall of Honor in Washington, D.C.
- Interactive map of the Labor Hall of Honor area

General information
- Location: 200 Constitution Avenue NW, Washington, DC
- Coordinates: 38.893396°N 77.014514°W

The United States Department of Labor Hall of Honor is in the Frances Perkins Building, 200 Constitution Ave., NW, Washington, D.C. It is a monument to honor Americans who have made a major contribution toward their country's workers; for example, by improving working conditions, wages, and quality of life.

== Background ==
First proposed during the John F. Kennedy administration in 1962 as the Hall of Fame, the Hall of Honor was opened in 1988. Honorees are selected each year by a panel inside the Department of Labor. All have been recognized posthumously with the exceptions of 2012 inductee Dolores Huerta and 2024 inductee President Joseph Robinette Biden Jr. President Biden is the first living and the first current president inducted. President Reagan was inducted posthumously during the Trump administration in 2018. https://www.dol.gov/newsroom/releases/osec/osec20241216-0 President Biden was honored as part of the ceremony designating the Frances Perkins Homestead in Maine as a National Historic Landmark under the authority granted by the Antiquities Act. https://www.nps.gov/orgs/1207/secretary-haaland-joins-president-biden-as-he-designates-frances-perkins-national-monument.htm

== Inductees ==
Its inductees include:

- 1989 – Cyrus S. Ching
- 1989 – John R. Commons
- 1989 – Samuel Gompers
- 1989 – John L. Lewis
- 1989 – George Meany
- 1989 – James P. Mitchell
- 1989 – Frances Perkins
- 1989 – A. Philip Randolph
- 1990 – Eugene V. Debs
- 1990 – Henry J. Kaiser
- 1990 – Walter P. Reuther
- 1990 – Robert F. Wagner
- 1991 – Mary Anderson
- 1991 – Philip Murray
- 1992 – Sidney Hillman
- 1992 – Mother Jones
- 1993 – David Dubinsky
- 1994 – George W. Taylor
- 1995 – Arthur J. Goldberg
- 1996 – William Green
- 1997 – David A. Morse
- 1998 – Cesar Chavez
- 1999 – Terence V. Powderly
- 2000 – Joseph A. Beirne
- 2002 – 9/11 Rescue workers
- 2002 – Jim Casey
- 2003 – Paul Hall
- 2003 – Milton Hershey
- 2003 – Steve Young
- 2004 – Peter J. McGuire
- 2004 – Harley-Davidson: William S. Harley; Arthur Davidson; Walter Davidson; and William A. Davidson
- 2005 – Robert Wood Johnson
- 2005 – Peter J. Brennan
- 2006 – Charles R. Walgreen
- 2006 – Alfred E. Smith
- 2007 – Adolphus Busch
- 2007 – William B. Wilson
- 2008 – John Willard Marriott
- 2008 – Leonard F. Woodcock
- 2010 – Justin Dart, Jr.
- 2010 – Helen Keller
- 2011 – The Workers of the Memphis sanitation strike
- 2012 – The Pioneers of the Farm Worker Movement
- 2012 – Rev. Addie Wyatt
- 2012 – Tony Mazzocchi
- 2012 – Mark Ayers
- 2012 – Dolores Huerta
- 2013 – Bayard Rustin
- 2013 – Esther Peterson
- 2014 – The Chinese Railroad Workers
- 2015 – Ted Kennedy
- 2016 – Frank Kameny
- 2018 – Ronald Reagan
- 2019 – Howard Jenkins Jr.
- 2020 – Robert P. Griffin
- 2022 – The Essential Workers of the Coronavirus Pandemic
- 2023 – The Bostock Plaintiffs
- 2023 – El Monte Thai Garment Workers
- 2024 - Joseph Robinette Biden Jr.
