= Clarence Addison Dykstra =

American academic administrator (1883–1950)

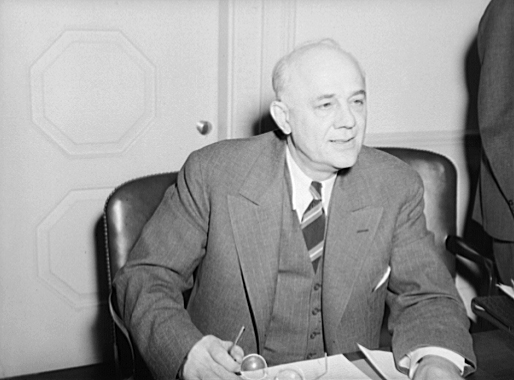
- Dykstra as chair of the National Defense Mediation Board (1941)

3rd Provost of the University of California, Los Angeles
- In office 1945–1950
- Preceded by: Earle Raymond Hedrick
- Succeeded by: Raymond B. Allen (Chancellor)

1st Director of the Selective Service System
- In office October 15, 1940 – April 1, 1941
- President: Franklin D. Roosevelt
- Preceded by: Office established
- Succeeded by: Lewis Blaine Hershey

Personal details
- Born: February 25, 1883
- Died: May 6, 1950 (aged 67)
- Occupation: Government administrator; University Chancellor

Academic background
- Education: University of Iowa (BA); University of Chicago

Clarence Addison Dykstra (/ˈdaɪkstrə/ DYKE-strə; February 25, 1883 – May 6, 1950) was a U.S. government administrator. He served as city manager in Cincinnati, Ohio, after teaching government at the University of Chicago. He then became president of the University of Wisconsin (1937–1945) as well as the 1st Director of the Selective Service System between 1940 and 1941. He then became provost of UCLA from 1945 to 1950.

He also served as the efficiency director of the city's Department of Water and Power for Los Angeles before World War II. He argued that the city needed to be further decentralized by expanding highways and creating suburban communities.

Dykstra was appointed by President Roosevelt to chair the 11-member National Defense Mediation Board, an effort to settle wartime disputes. He served from March 19 to July 1, 1941.

Because Dykstra had already served as a university president before coming to UCLA, he "was incensed at what he considered demeaning treatment of the provost by UC’s universitywide administration". During his five years at UCLA, he was popular and loved by the UCLA community. His "death on the job was a galvanizing event at UCLA and among the southern regents" which fueled political momentum towards decentralization of the university bureaucracy.

Dykstra was also the first to advocate for and bring about the construction of student housing at UCLA. Dykstra Hall, which opened in 1959, was the first structure in UCLA's current undergraduate residential community. It was also the first co-ed residence hall in the country.

== Notes ==
Academic offices
Preceded by George Sellery	Chancellor of the University of Wisconsin–Madison; 1937–1945	Succeeded by Edwin Broun Fred
Non-profit organization positions
Preceded by Harold W. Dodds	President of the National Municipal League; 1937–1940	Succeeded by John G. Winant
