= William Hammatt Davis =

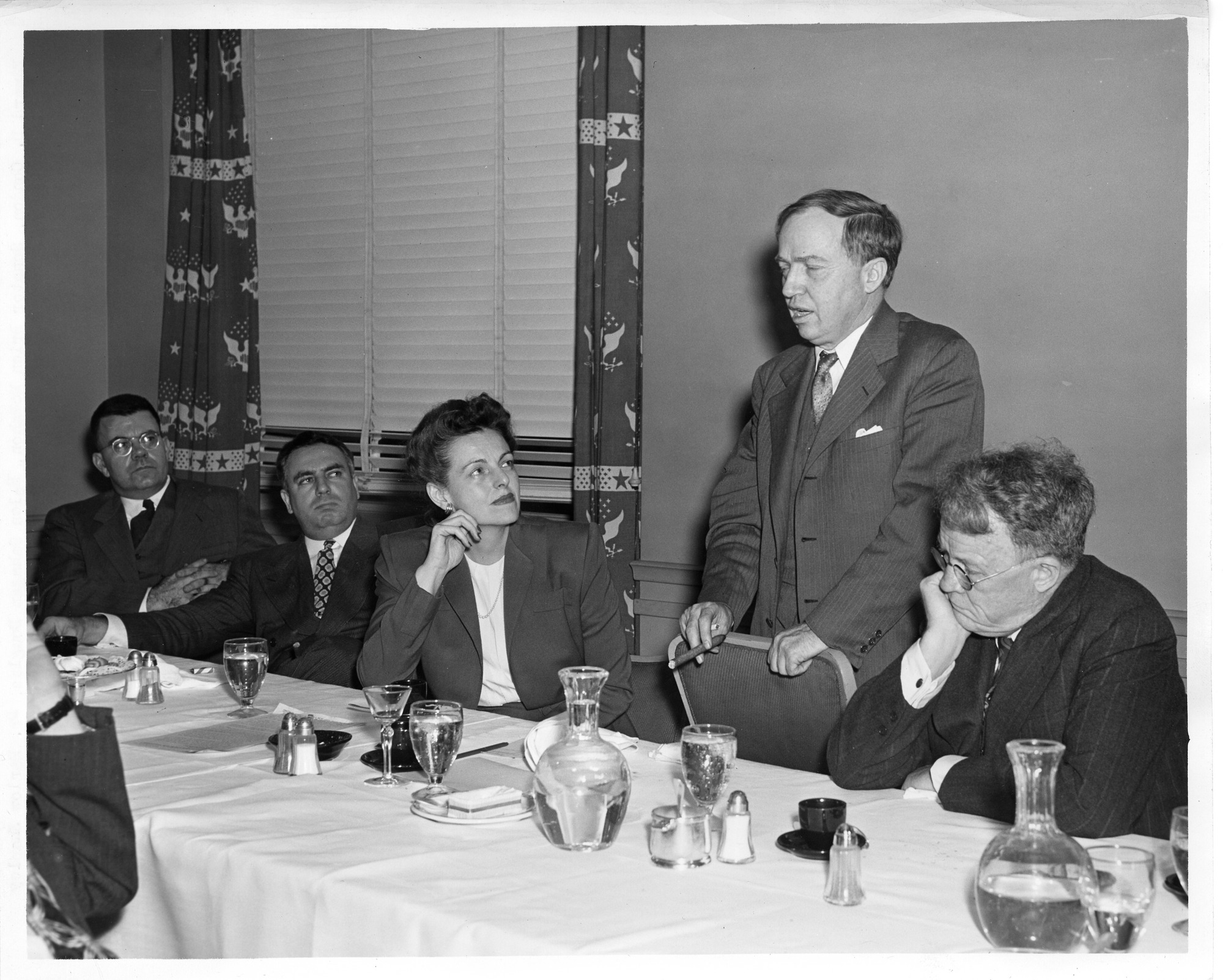
- William Hammatt Davis (right)
- Born: August 29, 1879; Bangor, Maine
- Died: August 13, 1964 (aged 84)
- Education: George Washington University
- Occupation: Chairman of the War Labor Board (WLB)
- Spouse: Grace D. Davis
- Relatives: Owen Davis (brother)

William Hammatt Davis (August 29, 1879 – August 13, 1964) was the Chairman of the War Labor Board (WLB) in the administration of President Franklin Roosevelt, where his job was keeping industrial peace between management and labor. He was also appointed US Economic Stabilizer in the last months of World War II, though Roosevelt's successor, Harry S. Truman, soon eliminated this potentially powerful position. Davis also helped draft the National Labor Relations Act (the Wagner Act) of 1935, which gave labor unions the right to organize.

== Early life ==
Born and raised in Bangor, Maine, Davis was the brother of Pulitzer Prize winning playwright Owen Davis. He graduated from Bangor High School and received a law degree from George Washington University in 1901. His first job was in the U.S. Patent Office, but he soon left to become a successful New York patent attorney. He returned to government service briefly in World War I, working in the War Department.

== New Deal and wartime service ==
When Franklin Roosevelt formed the National Recovery Administration (NRA) early in the New Deal, Davis was tapped as Deputy Administrator. The NRA was declared unconstitutional and disbanded in 1937, and Davis returned to New York to head the state's Labor Mediation Board. He developed such a good reputation as a mediator between management and labor that Roosevelt brought him back to Washington in 1941 to join (and soon chair) the National Defense Mediation Board (NDMB), which became the War Labor Board (WLB) in early 1942. Davis ran the Board until March 1945, when, seeing the end of the war in sight, Roosevelt named him Director of Economic Stabilization, to manage the return to a peace-time economy.

The NDMB-WLB Chairmanship was an important yet difficult position, Davis having to walk the line between management and organized labor. Though generally trusted by both sides, his main job was to strongly discourage strikes for the duration of the war. A frequent figure in news articles of the 1940s, Davis' success was often ascribed to his personality and appearance. The news magazine Time described him variously as "rumple-haired", "dry-humored", "shaggy", "humane", "tendacious", "chunky", and "grizzled", but above-all patient and fair-minded. A 1941 Time article praised his "phenominal [sic] record' of "peacably unraveling the most tangled wrangle", and declared him "one of the brightest hopes of the US had in the murky field of industrial disputes."

== From Roosevelt to Truman ==
While Roosevelt seemed to set up Davis as the 'czar' of post-war recovery by appointing him Economic Stabilizer, Harry Truman fired him within months of taking office, and eliminated his potentially powerful role. Davis became an open critic of Truman's labor policies, but the two must have reached some degree of accommodation by 1949, when Truman appointed Davis to head the Atomic Energy Commission's Labor Relations Panel.

== Other activities ==
Davis was involved with progressive New York philanthropic and cultural organizations throughout his career. While on the Labor Committee of Edward A. Filene's Twentieth Century Fund in the early 1930s, he worked closely with the office of Sen. Robert F. Wagner to craft the National Labor Relations Act. Later he served as chairman of the Board of Trustees of the New School for Social Research

Davis' wife, Grace D. Davis, died in 1972.
