= United States Conciliation Service =

Department of Labor agency (1913–1947)

The United States Conciliation Service was an agency within the U.S. Department of Labor that existed from 1913 until 1947 whose role was to bring labor disputes to a settlement through mediation.

== History ==
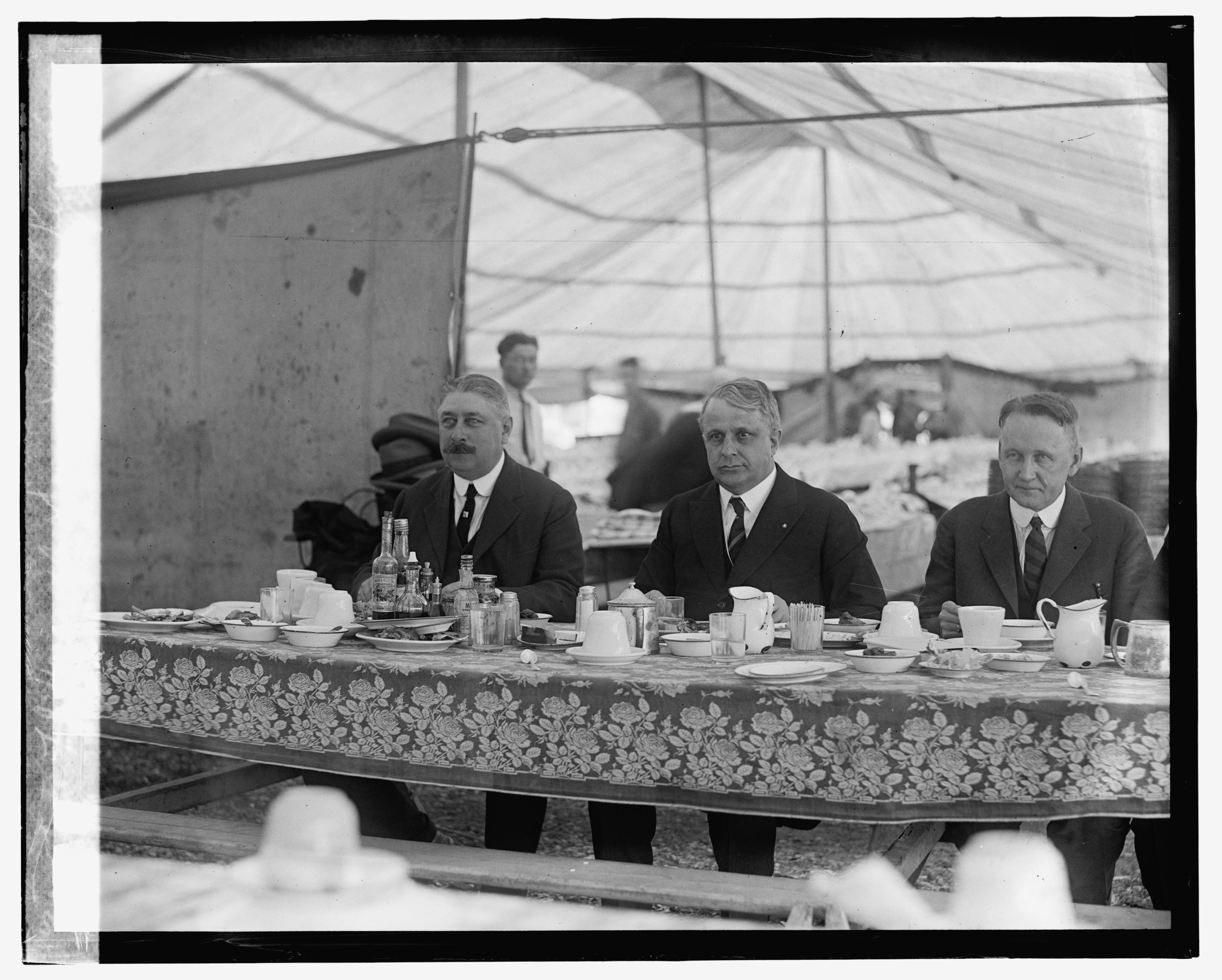
Hugh L. Kerwin (right), the first Director of the U.S. Conciliation Service, dining in 1924

The origins of the service lay in the act that created the Department of Labor in 1913, which act stated that the department would have the power to step in to act as a mediator in labor disputes whenever "the interests of industrial peace may require it to be done." Getting the service going was a focus of the first Secretary of Labor, William B. Wilson. The service was initially slow to build up because little money was budgeted for it, but by 1917, it had a directorship position and was clearly functioning as its own unit with the department. That first director of the service was Hugh L. Kerwin (who would remain in the position until 1937). Following the US entry into World War I, cases that the Conciliation Service could not or did not resolve were sent to the National War Labor Board.

Mediation cases were handled by people appointed as Commissioners of Conciliation, who vowed to act impartially. The conciliation process could be brought into play for both strike actions and lockouts and for any other type of industrial and labor relations matter. Participation in mediation was voluntary. Arbitration was also offered to those parties willing to agree to it. The service did not possess legal force of action, but instead relied upon both parties being interested in reaching agreement and, as a fallback, parties not wanting to appear uncooperative in the eyes of public opinion.

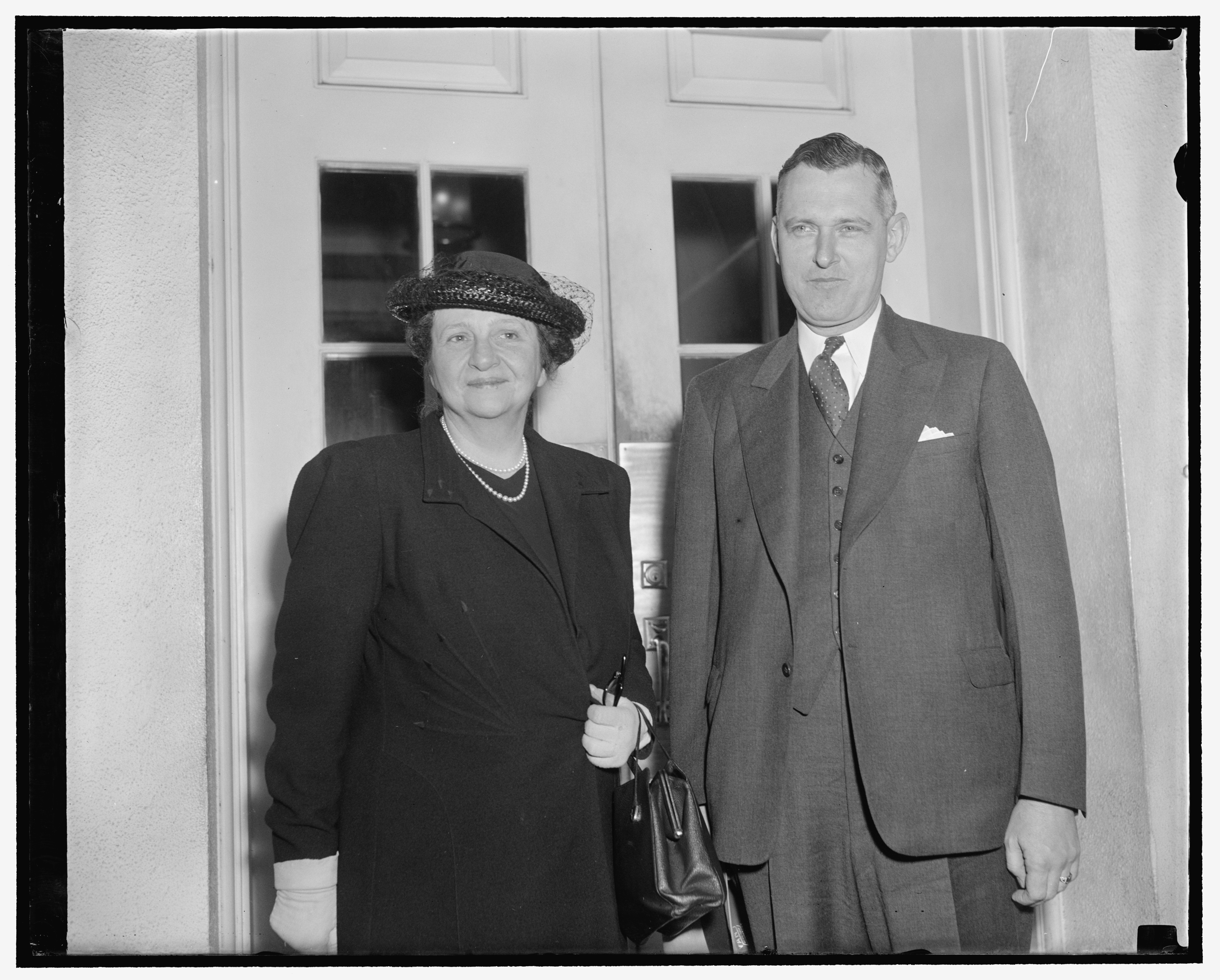
Secretary of Labor Frances Perkins and Director of the U.S. Conciliation Service John R. Steelman in 1939, after ordering to a representative of the service to Harlan County, Kentucky, in an effort to assist settlement of the struggle between mine workers and coal companies there

During the interwar period, the service's workload expanded and contracted with the fortunes of unions in the labor history of the United States. In particular, the number of Commissioners of Conciliation was sometimes as low as 35 or as high as 200. The first woman conciliator was hired in 1922, when Anna Weinstock was appointed for her expertise in textile labor issues.

By the early 1930s, management of the service had become lax, with erratic reporting to headquarters of what was happening in the field. When she became secretary of labor, Frances Perkins made changes to get the unit into a better-run and more effective entity. The service grew rapidly with in the mid-1930s and then again in the early-mid-1940s. John R. Steelman was the Director of the U.S. Conciliation Service from 1937 to 1944, having been chosen for that position by Perkins.

The service's work was especially important during World War II, when any halt in work could adversely affect war materials production or other vital economic activity. Those cases that the service could not solve, which overall was about a quarter of them, would typically get sent to a new instantiation of the National War Labor Board. During fiscal year 1945, the service handled some 26,000 cases, of which 5,000 were at the strike stage or close thereto. The final director of the service was Edgar L. Warren, appointed in 1945.

The service came to an end in 1947 due to the union-limiting Taft–Hartley Act and the creation of the Federal Mediation and Conciliation Service, a new independent agency that replaced the existing Conciliation Service. The conciliation function was taken out of the Department of Labor in part because industry forces thought the existing service had been too partial to labor, an assessment that officials of the service disputed. Over the lifetime of the U.S. Conciliation Service, it had handled over 122,000 cases.
