= Leezer =

Leezer is a surname. Notable people with the surname include:

- John Leezer (c. 1873–1938), American cinematographer
- Tom Leezer (born 1985), Dutch cyclist
