= Anna Weinstock Schneider =

American labor official

- Weinstock, from a 1924 publication
- Born: Anna Weinstock; 1895; Boston, Massachusetts, U.S.
- Died: March 11, 1979 (aged 83–84); Hollywood, Florida, U.S.
- Occupations: Labor organizer, federal official

Anna Weinstock Schneider (1895 – March 11, 1979) was an American labor organizer, suffragist, and federal official. She was president of the Boston Women's Trade Union League, and the first woman to be a federal mediator, when she was hired by the United States Conciliation Service in 1922.

== Early life and education ==
Weinstock was born in the Roxbury neighborhood of Boston, the daughter of Joseph Weinstock and Rebecca Seidel Weinstock. Her parents were German-Jewish immigrants. She began working in a necktie factory in her teens, after her father died. She studied during travels in Germany as a young woman, and was an organizer with the Massachusetts Suffrage Association.

== Career ==
Weinstock was president of the Boston Women's Trade Union League, and active in the International Ladies Garment Workers Union (ILGWU). In 1922, Weinstock was the first woman hired by the United States Conciliation Service, on the recommendation of Henry Cabot Lodge. For more than forty years, she specialized in mediating disputes in the textile industry.

In 1929, Weinstock successfully settled a dispute at a rayon mill in Tennessee. She mediated between striking woolen workers and Boston mill owners in 1954. "I drive a lot at night and when I see a plant where I've made a settlement all lit up and humming with activity, I like the feeling that I've been part of it," she told an interviewer in 1951. She retired from the Federal Mediation and Conciliation Service in 1965.

Weinstock received a federal distinguished service award in 1957, and was honored by the Textile Union of America in 1965 and the American Arbitration Association in 1977.

== Personal life and legacy ==
Weinstock married pharmaceutical executive Jesse Schneider. She died in 1979, in Hollywood, Florida, at the age of 83. Her papers are in the Kheel Center at Cornell University.
