= 1912 Boston streetcar strike =

1912 labor strike in Massachusetts, US

- Policemen guarding a streetcar during the strike
- Date: June 7 – July 29, 1912
- Location: Boston, Massachusetts, US
- Caused by: Conductors and carmen were fired for joining a union
- Goals: Union recognition, better wages, better working conditions
- Result: Boston Elevated Railway Company agreed to stop discriminating against unionized employees

During the 1912 Boston streetcar strike, conductors and carmen (or "motormen") of streetcars for Boston Elevated Railway Company (Note: In 1947, Boston Elevated Railway Company was "subsumed" by Metropolitan Transit Authority and became a government entity.) in Boston, Massachusetts, United States, went on a 53-day labor strike after the company retaliated against members of the labor union. The strikers demanded that the company recognize their union and provide better wages and working conditions. Ultimately, the strike ended after an arbitration settlement in favor of the union, and the company agreed to stop discriminating against union members.

== Events ==
Boston Elevated Railway Company managed both elevated railways and surface routes, absorbing streetcar services that were previously operated by the West End Street Railway in the late 19th century. In 1912, streetcar conductors and carmen from Boston Elevated Railway Company joined the local Boston Carmen's Union and tried to meet and negotiate with company leadership. Rather than recognize the union, the company fired approximately 300 unionized employees. (Note: The union's website notes 282 employees were fired, whereas the The New York Times wrote that it was 300.) In response, the union met and voted to strike on June 7, with 1,389 members in favor and only eight opposed. The strikers wanted better wages and working conditions, and they wanted the company to officially recognize their labor union.

During the course of the strike action, strikers attacked streetcars and disrupted car service in Boston. Policemen guarded streetcar barns (which housed cars when they were out of service) and rode along on streetcars, as the cars in some districts were pelted with "volleys of stones". A few days into the strike, a bomb damaged a streetcar on its route, resulting in minor injuries among passengers. As the strike continued into July, a man was caught trying to plant dynamite along a streetcar track. Harvard and Yale students enlisted as strikebreakers.

On June 16, a demonstration was held in support of the strikers on the Boston Common, with an estimated 50,000 to 75,000 men and women in attendance. The Boston Central Labor Union voted to boycott the car lines for the duration of the strike. Separately, students from Wellesley College also pledged to boycott the streetcars and donated $1,000 to the strike fund.

After 53 days, the strike ended on July 29. The Massachusetts State Board of Conciliation and Arbitration found that the strikers were justified in believing that many had been fired for joining the labor union. In the arbitration settlement, Boston Elevated Railway Company agreed to stop discriminating against union members.
