= Dexter Keezer =

American economist

Dexter Merriam Keezer (24 August 1895 – June 24, 1991) was an American economist who served as president of Reed College from 1934 to 1942.

== Biography ==
Dexter Merriam Keezer was born Aug. 24, 1895, in Acton, Massachusetts. He graduated from Amherst College in 1920, received an M.A. from Cornell University in 1923 and a Ph.D. from the Brookings Graduate School of Economics and Government in 1925. He taught at Cornell, the University of Colorado, the University of North Carolina, and Dartmouth College.

He served as president of Reed College from 1934 to 1942. There is some evidence he served in London in August 1943 in the offices of Lend-Lease Ambassador Averell Harriman. This is confirmed in the private papers of Lt. Gen. John C. H. Lee, the commander of all US Army logistics forces in the European Theater, who met with Harriman, his staff, and visitors on a weekly basis. Lee met with him in September and October 1943. He founded the department of economics at McGraw-Hill after joining the company in 1945.

Keezer died in 1991 in Orleans, Massachusetts.
