= Harry A. Millis =

American economist

Harry Alvin Millis
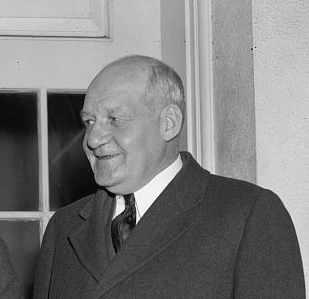
- Millis in 1938
- Born: April 14, 1873; Paoli, Indiana, U.S.
- Died: June 25, 1948 (aged 75); Chicago, Illinois, U.S.
- Occupations: Economist; government employee

Harry Alvin Millis (May 14, 1873 – June 25, 1948) was an American civil servant, economist, and educator who was prominent in the first four decades of the 20th century. He was a prominent educator, and his writings on labor relations were described at his death by several prominent economists as "landmarks". Millis is best known for serving on the "first" National Labor Relations Board, an executive-branch agency which had no statutory authority. He was also the second chairman of the "second" National Labor Relations Board, where he initiated a number of procedural improvements and helped stabilize the Board's enforcement of American labor law.

== Early life ==
Millis was born on May 14, 1873, in Paoli, Indiana. He attended and graduated from Paoli High School. He was heavily involved in athletics in his youth. He enrolled at Indiana University Bloomington, receiving his Bachelor of Arts degree in 1895 and his Master of Arts in finance in 1896. He was the first graduate student of John R. Commons, the renowned institutional economist. Millis entered the sociology program at the University of Chicago in 1896 but in 1898 he switched to the economics program and received his Doctor of Philosophy in economics in 1899.

From 1899 to 1902 he was reference librarian at the John Crerar Library, a then-independent, privately owned public library focusing on research and teaching in science, medicine, and technology. In 1901, he married the former Alice May Schoff. The couple had three children: a son, John, and two daughters, Savilla and Charlotte. Alice received her Bachelor of Laws from the University of Cincinnati and her Master of Philosophy from the University of Michigan. He left his position at Crerar Library in 1902 to become professor of economics and sociology at the University of Arkansas. He taught there for only two years. He joined the faculty at Stanford University in 1904 after being appointed assistant professor of economics. While at Stanford, he became friends with the controversial economist Thorstein Veblen, and helped Veblen and his wife find housing at the college. While at Stanford, he met and became friends with the nationally known economists Edwin Robert Anderson Seligman and Thomas Sewall Adams, and in 1907 co-founded the National Tax Association (a nonpartisan organization that fosters the study of tax theory, tax policy, and other areas of public finance). In 1908, he published the article "Business and Professional Taxes as Sources of Local Revenue" in the Journal of Political Economy. The article made the case for taxes on professionals and businesses as a means of broadening the tax base and avoiding over-reliance on property taxes. Simeon E. Leland, Dean of the College of Liberal Arts at Northwestern University and chair of the Federal Reserve Bank of Chicago, later said it was a landmark in the study of state tax issues and anticipated the later, better-known work by Seligman and Adams. Millis left Stanford in 1911 and in the fall of 1912 joined the economics department at the University of Kansas.

Millis joined the Department of Economics at the University of Chicago in the fall of 1916 as an assistant professor of economics. He was appointed chair of the department in 1928, and became professor emeritus in 1938 at the age of 65. He became associated with the "institutional economics" school, whose foremost proponents were then primarily teaching at the University of Chicago. Between 1938 and 1945, he and Royal E. Montgomery of Cornell University co-wrote a three-volume study titled The Economics of Labor. At the time of his death, a group of prominent economists called it "the most authoritative and comprehensive analysis of modern labor economics for the period covered." He followed this with How Collective Bargaining Works in 1942, a text which set the pattern for case studies in the field of industrial relations.

== Public service ==
Millis was a firm believer in "practical" economics and labor relations, the idea that an academic should not merely study from afar but should actively participate in the practice of his or her subjects. Accordingly, Millis agreed to serve on a number of public boards, commissions, and agencies throughout his life. He served as a staff economist and field investigator for the United States Immigration Commission from 1908 to 1910, studying Asian immigration on the West Coast and in the Rocky Mountain states and authoring a three-volume report on the issue. His 1915 book The Japanese Problem in the United States argued for restrictions on Japanese migration to the United States. He argued the Japanese would lower living standards on the West Coast and they would not assimilate. However, he argued that Japanese individuals in the United States should be permitted to gain citizenship to the United States on the same basis as other immigrants, and that individual states in the United States should not bar the Japanese from buying land.

He was director of the Illinois Health Insurance Commission from 1918 to 1919, where he oversaw the state's first large-scale effort to collect health statistics, assess the health of the citizenry, study the implementation of health laws, and make policy recommendations regarding health insurance.

From 1919 to 1921, he was chairman of the Trade Board of the Chicago Men's Clothing Industry, where he helped mediate labor disputes in the textile industry. He was chairman of the Trade Board's Arbitration Committee from 1923 to 1924 and again from 1937 to 1940.

=== "First" NLRB ===
In 1934, Millis was named a member of the "first" National Labor Relations Board. On June 16, 1933, President Franklin D. Roosevelt signed the National Industrial Recovery Act (NIRA) into law. Title I, Section 7(a) of the Act guaranteed the right of workers to form unions, and it set off a massive wave of union organizing punctuated by employer and union violence, general strikes, and recognition strikes. Although it was felt Section 7(a) would be self-policing, that assumption failed almost immediately. On August 5, 1933, President Roosevelt announced that the National Recovery Administration was being instructed to establish a National Labor Board (NLB) to administer Section 7(a). (Millis served as the vice-chair of the NLB's Chicago office.) But the NLB provided ineffective without any statutory or regulatory powers, so Roosevelt issued Executive Order 6511 on December 16, 1933, to strengthen the NLB and give it the force of executive authority. But this, too, proved too little to deal with the tremendous labor relations problems facing the country. Finally, threatened with a major strike in the steel industry and a Senate labor relations bill moving forward without presidential input, Roosevelt personally drafted Public Resolution No. 44, a bill which authorized the president to create one or more new labor boards to enforce Section 7(a) by conducting investigations, subpoenaing evidence and witnesses, holding elections, and issuing orders. It passed both houses of Congress on June 16, and Roosevelt signed it into law on June 19, 1934. Roosevelt issued Executive Order 6073 on June 29, 1934, which abolished the NLB and established the National Labor Relations Board. The three-person board was empowered to hold hearings and make findings of fact, investigate violations of Section 7(a), and hold union organizing elections to resolve labor disputes. Millis expressed no interest in serving on the NLRB. Nonetheless, he was asked to join the new board based on his national reputation as an arbitrator, and agreed to do so. Millis was sworn in as a member of the "first" NLRB on July 9, 1934.

Millis played a role in keeping the "first" NLRB independent. The NLRB's chairman, 36-year-old Lloyd K. Garrison, had agreed to serve as the chair only to get the board up and running, and he resigned on October 2, 1934, to resume his position as dean of the University of Wisconsin Law School. Garrison suggested as his replacement a long-time friend, Francis Biddle, a prominent Philadelphia attorney. Biddle was appointed to the post on November 16. Secretary of Labor Frances Perkins, however, had long sought to assert her department's control over the NLRB, but Garrison and Perkins came to an informal agreement which preserved the NLRB's independence. With Garrison's departure, however, Perkins sought to abrogate this agreement. She secretly met with President Roosevelt and secured changes to the executive order appointing Biddle to the NLRB which placed the agency completely under her control. Millis learned of the content of the executive order and alerted Biddle. Biddle confronted Perkins hours before his swearing-in, and Perkins agreed to hold the order in abeyance until she, Biddle, and the president could meet. Roosevelt later agreed that his order had been inappropriate, and told Biddle that he would not rescind the order but he also would not enforce it (personally guaranteeing the NLRB's independence).

Millis impressed his colleagues on the "first" NLRB. Garrison called him immensely experienced, with excellent judgment and common sense. Biddle said Millis educated him about the history of the labor movement, and called Millis cautious, thoughtful, wise, and cheerful. Millis was, Biddle said, "profoundly conscious of the injustices that had been done labor's attempt to organize, although at the same time aware of the dangerous weaknesses in a good deal of labor leadership: not only the racketeering and the feather-bedding, but the lack of imagination, the insistence on improved wages and hours as the sole end, the petty jurisdictional jealousies and squabbles..."

Millis played a major role in maintaining the "first" NLRB's jurisdiction as well. On June 18, 1934, the National Labor Board asserted jurisdiction over a labor dispute at the Call-Bulletin, a newspaper in San Francisco, California. Although the National Labor Board was disbanded two weeks later, but the "first" NLRB asserted continued jurisdiction over the dispute. At a hearing in Washington, D.C., on November 13, 1934, counsel for the newspaper asserted that NIRA gave exclusive jurisdiction over all newspaper industry labor disputes to the Newspaper Industrial Board (NIB). The NIB was a body established by the Code of Fair Competition for the Daily Newspaper Publishing Business, a "fair trade" code established under the authority of NIRA and approved by President Roosevelt. If the NLRB bowed to the newspaper's interpretation, it would be essentially giving up all of its authority to the National Recovery Administration (NRA), with which it was already locked in a jurisdictional struggle. Instead, the NLRB decided to challenge the NRA's claim of authority over all labor disputes in industries covered by NIRA codes. On December 3, 1934, Millis and the other NLRB members issued a public statement declaring that NIRA granted the NRA no exclusive jurisdiction over labor disputes, and pointing out that since the NIB had deadlocked on all major issues before it the NLRB would step in. NRA chief counsel Donald Richberg angrily supported the NIB and the newspaper industry, and challenged the NLRB's jurisdictional claim. The dispute between the NRA and NLRB threatened to cause the collapse of the NRA Labor Advisory Board, and the automobile, rubber, steel, and textile industries threatened to withdraw from their respective industry code boards. After the NLRB decided in favor of the Call-Bulletin's workers in December 1934, the NRA refused to enforce the decision. Unfortunately, President Roosevelt issued a letter on January 22, 1935, requesting that the NLRB decline jurisdiction in a small number of NIRA codes and asking the NLRB to submit any recommendations it did make in such disputes confidentially to the president. The following day, Millis, Biddle, and NLRB member Edwin S. Smith agreed to challenge the president on the jurisdictional issue. Millis and Smith even threatened to resign, causing the collapse of the NLRB, if Roosevelt insisted on enforcing his letter of January 22. Millis, Biddle, and Smith met with the President a few days later. Roosevelt agreed not to enforce his letter, to authorize an NLRB investigation into the Newspaper Industry Board's operations, and to write a letter to the NLRB members and staff promising not to get involved in any more jurisdictional issues. Roosevelt also made it clear that he wanted the NLRB to steer clear of any disputes in the politically sensitive auto industry. However, although the letter to the NRLB was issued, Roosevelt insisted that it not be made public (so that it would not appear as if he had backed off his previous announcement).

Millis was not on the "first" NLRB for long. Senator Robert F. Wagner was continuing to push for comprehensive federal labor relations legislation. His bill, which became the National Labor Relations Act (NLRA), was enacted by Congress on June 27, 1935, and signed into law by President Roosevelt on July 5. Millis, wishing to return to his home in Chicago, resigned from the NLRB shortly after passage of the NLRA and was succeeded on the Board by John M. Carmody. Even as he left the Board, however, Millis successfully recommended David J. Saposs as first Chief Economist to lead the new NLRB Division of Economic Research.

=== Service between NLRBs ===
Millis returned to the University of Chicago. One of his students at this time was Oliver Cox, an African American who later was a noted economist. In 1937, he was appointed a member of the Illinois Commission on Unemployment and President Roosevelt appointed him to a Railway Labor Act fact-finding board in a dispute between the Chicago Great Western Railway and Brotherhood of Locomotive Engineers. His railway panel found that the railroad should not impose a 15 percent wage reduction on the workers. Roosevelt appointed him to a second railways panel in 1938 to arbitrate a dispute between the million members of the Railway Labor Executives' Association (an umbrella group representing 18 railway labor organizations) and the Association of American Railways (which represented all long-haul railroads in the U.S.). In 1940, he sat on a third arbitration panel which resolved a long-running wage dispute between American Railway Express and its unions.

In 1940, President Roosevelt asked Millis to become the permanent arbiter between General Motors (GM) and the United Auto Workers (UAW). The 1937 collective bargaining agreement between the company and its union established a temporary, voluntary arbitration procedure, which was made permanent in the 1940 contract. It was the first permanent arbitration mechanism in any mass production industry, and not only the union but many companies and politicians were eager to see it succeed. Several of President Roosevelt's aides and confidantes urged Millis to accept the position. He agreed. However, Millis refused the large salary that was offered to him, and instead took only the same moderate salary he had been receiving at the university. Although he was arbitrator for only a few months, he laid the groundwork for smooth labor relations not only at General Motors but set a pattern for arbitration that spread throughout the manufacturing sector of the economy.

Finally, in March 1940, Millis joined Collective Bargaining Advisors, a private group dedicated to promoting peaceful labor relations through "scientific" practices.

== NLRB chairmanship ==
Millis had been GM-UAW arbitrator for only a few months when he was asked to be the chairman of the National Labor Relations Board.

=== Appointment ===
For more than two years, the NLRB had been under severe political pressure, and its chairman, J. Warren Madden, was seen as a political liability. The Board had issued three decisions (Fansteel Metallurgical, 5 NLRB 930 (1938); Inland Steel, 9 NLRB No. 73 (1938); and Republic Steel, 9 NLRB No. 33 (1938)) in 1938 which drew widespread condemnation from businesses and certain members of Congress. The Board won (In re Labor Board, 304 U.S. 486 (1938)) and then lost (Ford Motor Co. v. NLRB, 305 U.S. 364 (1939)) cases before the Supreme Court regarding its internal decision-making processes. And in three cases in 1939 (National Labor Relations Board v. Fansteel Metallurgical Corp., 306 U.S. 240 (1939); National Labor Relations Board v. Columbian Enameling & Stamping Co., 306 U.S. 292 (1939); and National Labor Relations Board v. Sands Manufacturing Co., 306 U.S. 332 (1939)) the Supreme Court emasculated the Board's attempts to expansively use Section 10(g) of the NLRA to promote collective bargaining and labor peace. Media and public opinion turned strongly against what was perceived as an overreaching NLRB, and President Roosevelt announced the formation of a commission to study the Board's operations. By March 1939, 11 bills had been filed in Congress to amend the NLRA. The House of Representatives voted to create a special committee, the Special Committee to Investigate the National Labor Relations Board (popularly known as the "Smith Committee" after its chairman, conservative Democratic Representative Howard W. Smith), in July 1939. The Smith Committee was substantially biased against labor unions and the NLRB, received testimony from hundreds of witnesses, conducted a nationwide survey regarding the impact of the NLRB, and questioned NLRB officials at length about the agencies alleged anti-business and anti-American Federation of Labor/pro-Congress of Industrial Organizations biases. Nathan Witt, the Board's Secretary (and highest-ranking career official), was also under fire from the Smith Committee for his communist sympathies. The Smith Committee proposed legislation to substantially alter the NLRA. The legislation easily passed the House, but was bottled up by Roosevelt's allies in the Senate and it died. The dispute over the Board's administration had even split the NLRB itself. Board members William S. Leiserson and Edwin S. Smith were at loggerheads (Leiserson having accused Smith of being biased toward labor and the CIO in particular), and Leiserson threatened to quit if Madden was reappointed. The Roosevelt administration now considered Madden a political liability, and resolved to replace him.

NLRB Chairman J. Warren Maddden's term on the Board expired on August 27, 1940. President Roosevelt, campaigning for re-election, refused to name successor to Madden until the election was over. Senator Wagner and influential Roosevelt confidante and labor leader Sidney Hillman both suggested Millis to the president. After the election, Roosevelt personally contacted Millis and asked him to be NLRB Chairman. Millis later said, "I was dragged into that job by the President; I certainly was not a candidate for membership on the Board, much less the chairmanship." Word leaked of the Millis appointment on November 6, the day after the election. His nomination was officially announced on November 14. Media outlets said that Millis' nomination was intended to replace a "radical" majority on the Board with one that was merely "liberal." Millis' appointment had an immediate effect. Witt resigned immediately. David Saposs, also under fire for alleged communist beliefs, left the Board on October 11 after Congress defunded his office. Millis was confirmed by the Senate on November 26. Thomas I. Emerson, chief of NLRB's Review Division, resigned the next day—the same day that Millis was sworn in as NLRB Chairman.

=== Changes instituted at the Board ===
Millis implemented significant administrative changes at the NLRB. His goal was to get the NLRB out of the limelight in wake of Smith Committee investigation. He deliberately made the NLRB more dependent on Congress and the executive branch for its survival.

Millis allied with Leiserson against Edwin S. Smith, and made extensive changes in NLRB administration, doctrine, personnel and operations. Smith strongly criticized these changes, but Millis replied that Smith had refused to discuss these changes or participate in Board decisions making them and had thus lost his right to criticize. Millis stripped the office of Secretary of all its power and never filled the position, set up an Administrative Division to supervise the 22 regional offices, initiated a study of the Board's administrative procedures, and genuinely delegated power to the regional offices. He appointed Robert Watts as the agency's new chief counsel, removed casehandling and regional office communication from the jurisdiction of the Office of the Secretary, created a Field Division, delegated large amounts of authority to field offices, and generally implemented the recommendations of a 1939 internal staff report (which had been stalled by Chairman Madden because it would have taken authority out of Witt's hands). He also adopted most of the recommendations William Leiserson had made regarding how the Board made its decisions, which included basing decisions on trial examiner's report, authorizing NLRB review attorneys to review each report, drafting decisions for review ahead of time, authorizing review attorneys to revise the draft before a final decision was issued, altering the trial examiner's report to emphasize findings of fact and to support points of law, and holding Board conferences when there were differences of opinion over decisions. He also eliminated Review Division's decisive role in cases, which had been established under Madden and Witt. Madden and Witt had adopted a highly centralized Board structure so that (generally speaking) only the cases most favorable to the Board made it to the courts. The centralized structure meant that only the strongest cases made it to the Board itself, where the Board could apply all its economic and legal powers to crafting the best decision possible. This strategy had enabled to Board to defend itself very well before the Supreme Court, so that the Court upheld the NLRA when few expected it to do so. But Madden and Witt had held on to the centralized strategy too long, and made political enemies in the process. Millis dismantled Madden's centralized process which had been used to win court litigation, and substituted a decentralized process in which the Board was less a decision-maker and more a provider of services to the regions. Many of the changes Millis instituted were designed to mimic requirements placed on other agencies by the Administrative Procedure Act.

Millis' alliance with Leiserson also overturned a number of the NLRB's more radical precedents and established a more moderate labor policy. Where the Madden Board had issued wide-ranging decisions approving multi-plant locals in Shipowners Association of the Pacific Coast, 7 NLRB 1002 (1938) and Libbey-Owens-Ford Glass Company, 10 NLRB 1470 (1939) (decisions that favored industrial unions like the CIO), Millis worked with Leiserson to overturn these precedents in Shipowners Association of the Pacific Coast, 32 NLRB 668 (1941) and Libbey-Owens Ford, 31 NLRB 243 (1942). The Millis-led Board also issued a number of decision that turned the bar on representation petitions during the term of the contract into a tool for ensuring the security of incumbent unions. Although the Madden Board had held in A. Sartorious, 10 NLRB 403 (1938), that strikebreakers were not eligible to participate in union organizing elections, the Millis Board voted in In Rudolph Wurlitzer Co., 32, NLRB 163 (1941) to overturn that precedent. The Madden Board had held in Inland Steel, 9 NLRB 783 (1938) that a company was responsible for actions of its foremen, but the Millis Board overturned this decision in Joseph E. Seagram & Sons, Inc., 32 NLRB 1056 (1941). The Madden Board had ruled several times that an employer could be held guilty of NLRA violations no matter the circumstances, but in New York and Porto Rico S.S. Co., 34 NLRB 1028 (1941), the Millis-led Board said the employer was absolved of guilt if it had been forced to act under union economic pressure. These and other critical decisions by the Millis Board were strongly approved of by Secretary of Labor Perkins and President Roosevelt.

Not all changes at the NLRB deepened Millis' control of the Board. When Edwin S. Smith's term expired in August 1941, Millis wrote to Roosevelt and suggested William Hammatt Davis (Deputy Administrator of the NRA), attorney (and later Senator) Wayne Morse, Professor George W. Taylor, and economist Edwin E. Witte as Smith's replacement. Secretary Perkins suggested Gerard D. Reilly, a solicitor in the Department of Labor. Reilly won Roosevelt's approval. Reilly, however, was very conservative and adopted a legalistic approach to labor law, and Millis and many others at the NLRB considered him a reactionary. Reilly believed Millis was too much influenced by Chief Trial Examiner Frank Bloom (a left-wing lawyer) and Oscar Smith, head of Field Division. Millis thought Reilly's legalism interfered with "realistic" labor relations, and that he was too willing to impose his conservative views on national labor relations policy just as Madden and Smith had imposed their liberal views.

=== Chairmanship during World War II ===
The United States entered World War II on December 8, 1941, and the war significantly changed the NRLB and Millis' tenure as chairman.

On January 12, 1942, President Roosevelt created the National War Labor Board (NWLB), whose existence displaced the NLRB as the main focus of federal labor relations for the duration of the war. The NWLB was given the authority to "finally determine" any labor dispute which threatened to interrupt war production, and to stabilize union wages and benefits during the war. Although Roosevelt instructed the NWLB not to intrude on jurisdiction exercised by the NLRB, the War Labor Board refused to honor this request. But Millis was not adept at bureaucratic maneuvering, and did not understand that press attention could help him win battles with the NWLB. For the next three years, Millis tried to secure a jurisdictional agreement with NWLB chair George W. Taylor, but these discussions proved fruitless and Millis broke them off in June 1945. The NWLB also heavily raided the NLRB for staff, significantly affecting Millis' ability to ensure NLRB operations. From July 1942 to October 1943, the NLRB lost more than 150 staff, including several regional directors, to the War Labor Board.

Additional changes came with the passage of the War Labor Disputes Act on June 25, 1943. Enacted over Roosevelt's veto after 400,000 coal miners, their wages significantly lowered due to high wartime inflation, struck for a $2-a-day wage increase, Whenever a union threatened to strike, the legislation required NLRB (in part) to generate a strike ballot outlining all the collective bargaining proposals and counter-proposals, wait 30 days, and then hold a strike vote. The War Labor Disputes Act proved very burdensome. The NLRB processed 2,000 WLDA cases from 1943 to the end of 1945, of which 500 were strike votes. The act's strike vote procedures did little to stop strikes, however: 203 of the 232 strike votes taken in 1944 led to strike, and Millis feared unions were using the referendums to whip up pro-strike feelings among their members. Millis also believed the law's strike vote process actually permitted more strikes to occur than the NLRB would have allowed under its old procedures. There were so many strike vote filings in the six months after the war ended that NLRB actually shut down its long-distance telephone lines, cancelled all out of town travel, suspended all public hearings, and suspended all other business to accommodate the workload.

Additional Board personnel changes further moderated the NLRB during Millis' tenure. John Mills Houston was appointed to the Board in 1943 after William S. Leiserson's term expired and Leiserson did not seek reappointment to the agency. Millis formed a voting alliance with Houston some time in late 1944. Despite this alliance, Millis sometimes was unable to form majorities on the Board. He vigorously dissented in American News Company, Inc., 55 1302 (1944), a decision in which the Board held that strikers not protected from discharge or refusals of reinstatement if they struck for an illegal reason. Millis feared this would resurrect the vague "legality of objective" test which the Board had rejected long ago.

By early 1945, Millis was in ill health. He resigned from the NLRB on June 7, 1945. His successor was Paul M. Herzog.

== Retirement and death ==
In the fall of 1945, Millis returned to the University of Chicago. He became senior adviser to the newly formed Industrial Relations Center, and (with former student Emily Clark Brown) began a major analysis of federal labor policy. Their co-authored work, From Wagner Act to Taft-Hartley: A Study of National Labor Policy and Labor Relations, had just been completed when he died.

Millis was critical of the Board in his last years. The Madden Board had held in American Can Co., 13 NLRB 1252 (1939) that a smaller craft union should not be created if there was any history of industrial union bargaining with the employer. Although Millis was critical of the American Can decision, he nonetheless rarely permitted it to be violated during his tenure on the Board. He took his successor, Paul Herzog, to task for repeatedly violating the American Can doctrine between 1945 and 1947. He also criticized the Herzog Board for becoming too dependent on Congress, for delaying decisions for political reasons, and for allowing consultation with interested parties to appear too much like undue influence He also criticized Herzog for being over-cautious and not enforcing the NLRA strongly enough.

Millis was a member of a number of associations during his lifetime. He was a longtime member of the American Economic Association, serving as its president from 1934 to 1935. He was also a member of the Chicago Bibliographic Society, a director of the National Bureau of Economic Research, a founder and director of the Agricultural Economics Foundation, and a member of the Social Science Research Council and the Cosmos Club.

Harry A. Millis died on June 25, 1948, at Albert Merritt Billings Hospital in Chicago, Illinois, two weeks after suffering a stroke. He was survived by his wife, Alice; son John (at the time, president of the University of Vermont); and daughters Savilla and Charlotte.

== Bibliography ==
- Bernstein, Irving. The Turbulent Years: A History of the American Worker, 1933-1941. Paperback edition. Boston: Houghton-Mifflin Co., 1970.
- "Biographical Dictionary." Electronic Encyclopedia of Chicago. Chicago Historical Society. 2005. Accessed 2010-11-09.
- "Both Houses Clear Wagner Labor Bill." The New York Times. June 28, 1935.
- Brown, Edwin L. "Arbitration." In Encyclopedia of U.S. Labor and Working-Class History. Eric Arnesen, ed. New York: CRC Press, 2007.
- Brown, Emily Clark; Douglas, Paul H.; Harbison, Frederick H.; Lazaroff, Louis; Leiserson, William M.; and Leland, Simeon. "Harry Alvin Millis, 1873-1948." American Economic Review. 39:3 (June 1949).
- Current Biography. Bronx, New York: H.W. Wilson Co., 1940.
- "Dr. H.A. Millis Dies." The New York Times. June 26, 1948.
- "Dr. Harry A. Millis of U. of C., Former NLRB Chairman, Dies." Chicago Daily Tribune. June 26, 1948.
- "Dr. Millis Slated to Head the NLRB." The New York Times. November 7, 1940.
- Dubofsky, Melvyn and Dulles, Foster Rhea. Labor in America: A History. 6th ed. Wheeling, Illinois: Harlan Davidson, Inc., 1999.
- "Educational Notes and News." School and Society. August 5, 1916.
- Edwards, Willard. "Millis Picked to Head NLRB, Capital Hears." Chicago Daily Tribune. November 15, 1940.
- "F.B. Biddle Named Labor Board Head." The New York Times. November 17, 1934.
- "Fact Board Set Up On Railway Strike." The New York Times. September 28, 1938.
- Finegold, Kenneth and Skocpol, Theda. State and Party in America's New Deal. Madison, Wisc.: University of Wisconsin Press, 1995.
- "Frank Says Garrison Will Return As Dean." The New York Times. September 16, 1934.
- "Garrison Resigns Labor Board Post." The New York Times. October 3, 1934.
- Gross, James A. The Making of the National Labor Relations Board: A Study in Economics, Politics, and the Law, 1933-1937. Albany, New York: State University of New York Press, 1974.
- Gross, James A. The Reshaping of the National Labor Relations Board: National Labor Policy in Transition, 1937-1947. Albany, New York.: State University of New York Press, 1981.
- Henning, Arthur Sears. "Naming Millis to NLRB Deals Radicals Blow." Chicago Daily Tribune. November 16, 1940.
- "House Rules Group Votes NLRB Inquiry." The New York Times. July 1, 1939.
- "House Shunts Labor Committee Aside and Sets Up Body of 5." The New York Times. July 21, 1939.
- "House Votes $50,000 to Investigate NLRB." The New York Times. August 2, 1939.
- Hunter, Herbert M. "Political Economy: Oliver C. Cox." In A Different Vision: African American Economic Thought. Thomas D. Boston, ed. Florence, Kentucky.: Routledge, 1996.
- "In Administration Shake-Up." Associated Press. June 8, 1945.
- "Inquiry Into NLRB Will Start Sept. 7." The New York Times. August 8, 1939.
- Karatnycky, Adrian. Freedom in the World: The Annual Survey of Political Rights and Civil Liberties, 2000-2001. Rev. ed. Piscataway, New Jersey.: Transaction Publishers, 2000.
- "Labor Advisors Pick Educator As Head." The New York Times. March 31, 1940.
- Lichtenstein, Nelson. Walter Reuther: The Most Dangerous Man in Detroit. Urbana, Illinois: University of Illinois Press, 1997.
- Malsberger, John William. From Obstruction to Moderation: The Transformation of Senate Conservatism, 1938-1952. Selinsgrove, Pann.: Susquehanna University Press, 2000.
- The Michigan Alumnus. Ann Arbor, Michigan: Alumni Association of the University of Michigan, 1955.
- "Milestones." Time. July 5, 1948.
- "Millis Is Sworn In As NLRB Chairman." The New York Times. November 28, 1940.
- "Millis, NLRB Ex-Chairman, Dies in Chicago." Washington Post. June 26, 1948.
- Morris, Charles. The Blue Eagle at Work: Reclaiming Democratic Rights in the American Workplace. Ithaca, New York: Cornell University Press, 2004.
- Morris, Richard B. Labor and Management. New York: Arno Press, 1973.
- "New NLRB Inquiry Is Proposed in House." The New York Times. June 23, 1939.
- "New Labor Board Starts Its Work." The New York Times. July 10, 1934.
- "New Teachers." The Graduate Magazine of the University of Kansas. October 1912.
- Nilan, Roxanne and Bartholomew, Karen. "No More 'The Naughty Professor': Thorstein Veblen at Stanford." Sandstone and Tile. 31:2 (Spring/Summer 2007). Accessed 2010-11-10.
- "Personal Notes." Annals of the American Academy of Political and Social Science. 16:2 (January 1904).
- "Rail Board Hears Rival Wage Pleas." The New York Times. October 1, 1938.
- "Roosevelt Extends Time for Rail Report." The New York Times. October 27, 1938.
- "Roosevelt Sets Up a New Labor Board." The New York Times. July 1, 1934.
- "Roosevelt Signs the Wagner Bill As 'Just to Labor'." The New York Times. July 6, 1935.
- Schlesinger Jr., Arthur M. The Age of Roosevelt, Volume 2: The Coming of the New Deal. Paperback ed. New York: Mariner Books, 2003. (Originally published 1958.)
- "Senate Confirms Millis and Dempsey Nominations." Chicago Daily Tribune. November 27, 1940.
- Stanger, Howard R. "The Evolution of an Alternative Grievance Procedure: The Columbus Typographical Union No. 5, 1859-1959." In New Research on Labor Relations and the Performance of University HR/IR Programs. Bruce E. Kaufman and David Lewin, eds. Amsterdam: JAI, 2001.
- Stark, Louis. "Houston Named to Labor-Board." The New York Times. March 6, 1943.
- Stark, Louis. "Methods of NLRB Indicated in Study Made By Own Men." The New York Times. March 22, 1940.
- Tomlins, Christopher. The State and the Unions: Labor Relations, Law, and the Organized Labor Movement in America, 1880-1960. Reprint ed. New York: Cambridge University Press, 1985.
- van Overtveldt, Johan. The Chicago School: How the University of Chicago Assembled the Thinkers Who Revolutionized Economics and Business. Chicago: Agate, 2007.
- Wolman, Leo; Wander, Paul; Mack, Eleanor; and Herwitz, H.K. The Clothing Workers of Chicago, 1910-1922. Chicago: Amalgamated Clothing Workers of America, 1922.
