= John M. Houston =

American politician (1890–1975)

John Houston
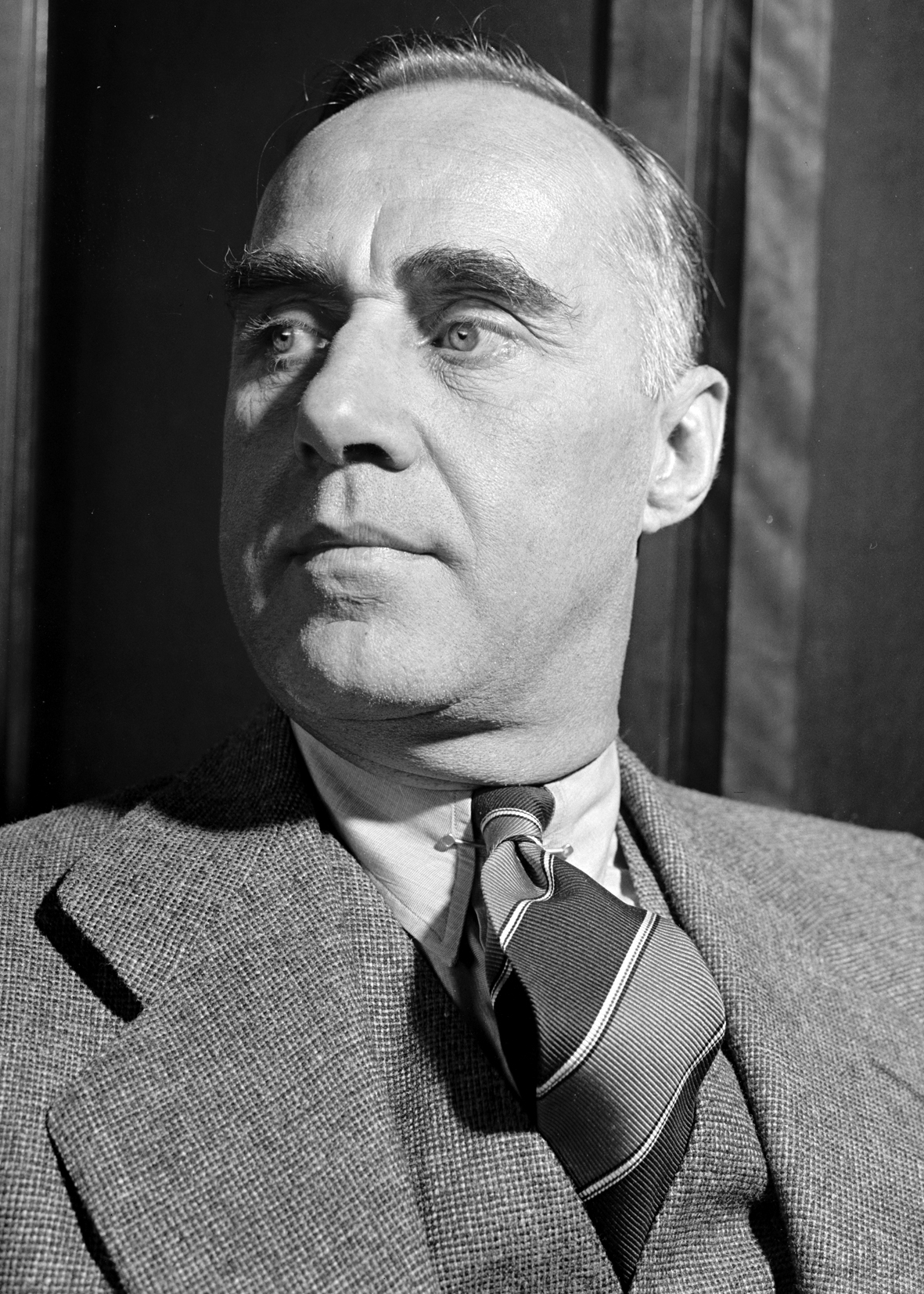
- John Mills Houston in October 1939

Member of the U.S. House of Representatives from Kansas's 5th district
- In office January 3, 1935 – January 3, 1943
- Preceded by: William Augustus Ayres
- Succeeded by: Clifford R. Hope

Mayor of Newton, Kansas
- In office 1927–1931

Personal details
- Born: September 15, 1890 Near Formoso, Kansas, U.S.
- Died: April 29, 1975 (aged 84) Laguna Beach, California, U.S.
- Party: Democratic
- Spouse(s): Charlotte Stellhorn Houston (divorced); Ireta Robinson Houston
- Children: Patricia Mary Jane, Robert Allan
- Education: Fairmount College

Military service
- Allegiance: United States
- Branch/service: United States Marine Corps
- Years of service: 1917-1919

John Mills Houston (September 15, 1890 – April 29, 1975) was a member of the United States House of Representatives from the 5th congressional district of Kansas from 1935 to 1943. He was also a member of the National Labor Relations Board from 1943 to 1953, originally appointed by President Franklin D. Roosevelt.

== Early life and career ==
John Houston was born to Samuel J. and Sarah H. (Nieves) Houston on a farm near the small town of Formoso in Jewell County, Kansas, in September 1890. His father was a wealthy businessman who owned a lumber yard. He attended public school in Wichita, Kansas, from the first to fifth grade. He then entered St. John's Military School in Salina, Kansas, graduating in 1905 after two years. He graduated Fairmount College (now known as Wichita State University) in Wichita, Kansas, in 1906, having focused on business administration.

From 1906 to 1912, he worked a series of odd jobs, but then became an actor on the theatrical stage with the Harry Frazee company. He was with the Frazee troupe from 1912 to 1917. At the outbreak of World War I, he enlisted in the United States Marine Corps, and was one of 19 men selected to act as President Woodrow Wilson's honor guard. He also served as a Marine guard at the State, War and Navy Building in Washington, D.C., and for a few months was the military orderly for United States Secretary of the Navy Josephus Daniels.

After the war, he returned to Kansas. He was manager of the Houston-Doughty Lumber Co. (the firm his father co-owned) from 1917 to 1935. During his tenure as manager of the firm, he also served a term as president of the Kansas Lumbermen's Association and as a member of the board of directors of the Kansas State Chamber of Commerce. He married Charlotte Stellhorn of St. Louis, Missouri, on May 28, 1919 (some sources say 1920). The couple had two children, Patricia (1922) and Robert (1925). Houston was elected mayor of Newton, Kansas, in 1927, serving two two-year terms. He was elected secretary of the Kansas Democratic State Central Committee in 1934, serving for a year. Houston was also active in the American Legion and in Freemasonry.

== Career ==
=== Congress ===
Houston was elected to the United States Congress by the voters of Kansas' 5th Congressional District in 1934. The incumbent, William Augustus Ayres, resigned from Congress on August 21, 1934, to accept an appointment to the Federal Trade Commission. Somewhat surprisingly, Houston easily defeated Republican Ira C. Watson 57 percent to 36.2 percent.

He won re-election two years later with 60 percent of the vote over Republican challenger J.B. Patterson. Houston barely defeated Republican Stanley Taylor in 1938, 43,990 to 43,480. In a rematch in 1940, Houston more handily defeated Taylor by a 5,500-vote margin (58,436 to 52,901).

During his tenure in Congress, Houston was a member of the House Committee on Appropriations.

The 1940 census led to redistricting which pitted Houston against Edward Herbert Rees, the incumbent Republican in Kansas' 4th congressional district. Rees easily defeated Houston, 55,612 to 44,333. Republican Clifford R. Hope, who had once held the 7th congressional district (it had been eliminated due to redistricting) won the new 5th district seat once held by Houston.

=== National Labour Relations Board ===
Houston's strong support for Roosevelt in Congress was rewarded when President Roosevelt appointed him on March 5, 1943, to succeed William M. Leiserson on the National Labor Relations Board (NLRB). His nomination was not well received. NLRB chairman Dr. Harry A. Millis had supported NLRB general counsel Robert B. Watts, and had urged Roosevelt repeatedly to appoint someone with extensive credentials in labor relations (which Houston lacked). Roosevelt also passed over Lloyd K. Garrison, Dean of the University of Wisconsin Law School and former chair of the National Labor Board (NLB) in the early 1930s; Dr. George W. Taylor, vice chairman of the National War Labor Board and a former NLB regional director; and Edward C. Witte, a noted professor of labor relations at the University of Wisconsin.

Houston had no labor relations experience prior to his service on the NRLB. For the first several years of his first five-year term on the board, Houston relied heavily on his legal staff for advice. United States Department of Labor solicitor general Gerard D. Reilly was appointed to the NLRB in September 1942 to replace the departing Edwin S. Smith. Reilly was deeply conservative, and some staff at the NLRB considered him reactionary. Reilly also had a great deal of influence on Houston during Houston's first few years in office. But as Houston gained experience, he forged an alliance with the NLRB's moderate chairman, Harry Millis, who was a firm believer in collective bargaining and labor unions. In his second five-year term on the NLRB, Houston became the most consistently pro-labor member of the board. Reilly came to believe that NLRB Chief Trial Examiner Frank Bloom (a left-wing lawyer) heavily influenced Houston in these later years.

Houston's renomination to the Board proved to be something of a watershed. In 1947, the Taft-Hartley Act expanded the NLRB's size from three to five members. President Harry S. Truman had appointed one relatively liberal and one relatively conservative member to the Board after the Act's passage. Houston was renominated for the NLRB on April 12, 1948. His renomination was seen as something of a restoration of a "New Deal" (e.g., liberal) coalition on the NLRB, one which would interpret federal labor law more expansively and in favor of labor unions.

Houston was involved in several important votes during his tenure on the NLRB. Almost immediately after joining the board, he allied with Chairman Millis in voting to overturn a previous decision of the NLRB and deny plant foremen the right to join unions (as they were supervisors and not employees). But just two years later, he and Millis allied again to overturn their 1943 decision. Houston and new NLRB Chairman Paul M. Herzog again combined in 1946 to uphold the 1945 decision. In 1945, he again allied with Millis to force the resignation of Charles T. Douds, the board's controversial and liberal Northeast regional director. In 1947, he was embroiled along with the Board in a major dispute over the Taft-Hartley Act. The Act had become law over President Truman's veto in the summer of 1947, and among its many provisions was a requirement that all elected union leaders file an affidavit with the NLRB asserting that they were not now and never had been a member of the Communist Party USA and that they disavowed any future attempt to overthrow the United States government by force. The question before the NLRB was whether this applied to union leaders who were elected not to sit on the executive board of their home union but to serve on the board of directors of some other federation, organization, or body. The NLRB's general counsel ruled that members of the boards of directors of the American Federation of Labor and Congress of Industrial Organizations must sign these oaths. This was a concern, since many of these individuals had been communists in their youth (although they were no longer). Since they did not hold elected positions on their home unions, they had escaped the Taft-Hartley Act's anti-communist oath provisions, but the general counsel's ruling put their service in jeopardy. Houston, along with three other members of the NLRB overruled the general counsel in a series of votes in September and October 1947.

== Retirement and death ==
Houston retired from the NLRB on August 27, 1953. Having divorced his first wife Charlotte, Houston married Ireta Robinson on November 16, 1945.

Houston moved to Laguna Beach, California. He died there April 29, 1975, after suffering a heart attack. He is interred in Melrose Abbey Cemetery, Anaheim, California.

== Footnotes ==
U.S. House of Representatives
Preceded by William Augustus Ayres	Member of the U.S. House of Representatives from Kansas's 5th congressional district 1935 – 1943	Succeeded by Clifford R. Hope
