= Blue Eagle =

Blue Eagle(s) may refer to:

- Blue Eagle (National Recovery Administration), a symbol used to show compliance with the U.S. National Industrial Recovery Act of 1933
- The Blue Eagle at Work, a legal treatise which analyzes collective bargaining under the National Labor Relations Act of 1935
- Blue Eagles, British Army Air Corps helicopter aerobatic team
- Blue Eagle (character), a Marvel Comics character
- The Blue Eagle, a 1926 film directed by John Ford
- Ateneo Blue Eagles, sports teams of Ateneo de Manila University
- Adelaide Blue Eagles, soccer club in Australia
- Blue Eagles FC, football club in Malawi
- Acee Blue Eagle (1907-1959), American artist
- MV Blue Eagle, a Singaporean coaster ship
- Chilean blue eagle, alias black-chested buzzard-eagle, Geranoaetus melanoleucus

== See also ==
- Blue Mountain Eagle (disambiguation)
