= Lloyd K. Garrison =

American lawyer (1897–1991)

- Born: Lloyd Kirkham Garrison; November 19, 1897; New York City, U.S.
- Died: October 2, 1991 (aged 93); New York City, U.S.
- Education: Harvard University (AB, LLB)
- Occupations: Attorney; Civil servant
- Spouse: Ellen Jay Garrison
- Children: Clarinda, Ellen, and Lloyd McKim

Lloyd Kirkham Garrison (November 19, 1897 – October 2, 1991) was an American lawyer. He was Dean of the University of Wisconsin Law School, but also served as chairman of the "first" National Labor Relations Board, chairman of the National War Labor Board, and chair of the New York City Board of Education. He was active in a number of social causes, was a highly successful attorney on Wall Street, and for a short time was a special assistant to the United States Attorney General.

== Early life and education ==
Garrison was born on November 19, 1897, in New York City to Lloyd McKim and Alice (Kirkham) Garrison. His great-grandfather was William Lloyd Garrison, the famous American abolitionist, and his grandfather was Wendell Phillips Garrison, who once was literary editor of The Nation (a left-wing magazine of politics and opinion). His father died of typhoid when Garrison was a child. His grandfather, who knew many Civil War-era abolitionists (Frederick Douglass was a frequent guest in the Garrison home in Roxbury, Massachusetts, and Wendell Garrison knew him personally), regaled young Lloyd with many stories about the great struggles for civil rights and liberties of the 19th century. He graduated from St. Paul's School, a college-preparatory boarding school in New Hampshire. He attended Harvard College, but quit school in 1917 to enlist in the United States Navy after the U.S. entered World War I. He returned to Harvard in 1919, and in 1922 he graduated with a Bachelor's degree from Harvard and a law degree from Harvard Law School.

He married Ellen Jay, a Boston socialite and direct descendant of Founding Father and Supreme Court Chief Justice John Jay, on June 22, 1921. The couple had three children: Clarinda, Ellen, and Lloyd.

== Early career and federal service ==
He moved to New York City in 1922, and was recruited by Elihu Root himself to join the prominent firm of Root, Clark, Buckner & Howland. He joined the National Urban League in 1924, after two African American men asked him to be treasurer of the nascent organization. He immediately agreed, and later said that it was this organization which made him aware of the true extent of racial discrimination in the United States. In 1926 he opened his own practice. He investigated "ambulance chasing" and bankruptcy fraud among the city's lawyers on behalf of the New York City Bar Association, and his work became so well known that in 1930 President Herbert Hoover appointed him special assistant to the U.S. Attorney General (where he served on a federal commission investigating bankruptcy fraud nationwide).

Garrison was named Acting Dean of the University of Wisconsin Law School in 1929, and Dean in 1932. As dean, Garrison led efforts to significantly revamp the curriculum, implementing a functionalist approach to the study of law, restructuring the first year to emphasize the origins and development of the American legal system, and creating a number of short courses in current law topics so that students would be prepared for the legal issues they encountered immediately upon graduation. When President Franklin D. Roosevelt abolished the National Labor Board in June 1934 and replaced it with the "first" National Labor Relations Board (NLRB), he appointed Garrison as the Board's first chairman. Although he served on the Board for only four months, Garrison led the Board in deciding Houde Engineering Corp., 1 NLRB 87 (1934), a landmark ruling in American labor law that required employers to bargain exclusively with the representatives elected by a majority of employees. Garrison, however, agreed to serve as the chair only to get the board up and running, and he resigned on October 2, 1934, to resume his position at the University of Wisconsin Law School. He served as president of the Association of American Law Schools for the 1936-1937 term. Roosevelt turned to Garrison again when he established a national mediation board in an (unsuccessful) attempt to quell the Little Steel Strike of 1937. Roosevelt later considered Garrison for the Supreme Court of the United States after Associate Justice Willis Van Devanter resigned on June 2, 1937. Garrison received a Guggenheim Fellowship in 1938.

Garrison took a leave of absence again from Wisconsin to serve on the National War Labor Board (NWLB) during World War II. The NWLB was established on January 12, 1942, by President Roosevelt to oversee war-related labor relations for the duration of the war and ensure that war-related production was not disrupted by labor disputes. Initially, Garrison was the War Labor Board's executive director and chief counsel. He was promoted to alternative public member in January 1944. A month later, he was elevated yet again to full public member. In the NWLB's final year of existence, he was its chairman.

== Later career ==
Garrison did not return to the University of Wisconsin after the war. Instead, he joined the New York City law firm of Weiss & Wharton (now renamed, after the addition of several partners, Paul, Weiss, Rifkind, Wharton and Garrison). Although he primarily practiced corporate law for the rest of his life, Garrison continued to represent high-profile clients in a variety of cases. In 1945, the United States Supreme Court appointed Garrison as a special master in Georgia v. Pennsylvania Railroad Co., 324 U.S. 439 (1945), and his hearings and report formed the basis for the Court's decision two years later in Georgia v. Pennsylvania Railroad Co., 331 US 788 (1947). In the late 1940s, Garrison served as legal counsel to the Field Foundation (created by his friend Marshall Field III from funds he inherited from his father, who founded the Marshall Field's department store) In 1948, Garrison served as a member of the board of directors of a pilot project established by the Foundation to build non-discriminatory low-income housing in the Greenwich Village neighborhood of New York City.

In 1953, as a member of the National Association for the Advancement of Colored People's National Legal Committee, Garrison advised Langston Hughes when Hughes was subpoenaed by Senator Joseph McCarthy to appear before the Senate Permanent Subcommittee on Investigations to testify about communist influences on his writings. That same year, he hired Pauli Murray, one of the first female African American lawyers in the country, as an associate at his firm. With John W. Davis, he represented Dr. J. Robert Oppenheimer before a panel of the Atomic Energy Commission in 1954. Oppenheimer had met Garrison in April 1953 when Garrison had joined the board of directors of the Institute for Advanced Study at Princeton. Garrison brought Davis in as Oppenheimer's co-counsel. Their defense of Oppenheimer was unsuccessful, however, and Oppenheimer's security clearance was revoked. Along with Joseph L. Rauh, Jr., Garrison also represented playwright Arthur Miller before the House Un-American Activities Committee in 1956 and in Miller's fight against his contempt of Congress conviction in 1957. In the 1950s, Garrison was also a supporter of the Highlander Research and Education Center, a liberal leadership training school and cultural center.

Garrison also remained active in areas outside the law after 1945. From 1947 to 1952 he served as President of the National Urban League. He was a close friend of Illinois Governor Adlai Stevenson, and strongly supported Stevenson's campaigns for President of the United States in 1952 and 1956. From 1958 to 1961, Garrison worked closely with Eleanor Roosevelt, Thomas Finletter, and Herbert H. Lehman to break the power of Tammany Hall-backed politician Carmine DeSapio in New York City politics. The efforts of Garrison and the other finally broke Tammany Hall's grip on the city for good: Ed Koch defeated De Sapio by 41 votes in 1963 and by 164 votes in a rematch in 1964, and De Sapio's political career ended. Garrison was a long-time member of the American Civil Liberties Union, and served on its board of directors from the late 1930s until at least 1965. Over the years, he was also a member of the board of trustees for Harvard University, Sarah Lawrence College, and Howard University. While serving on the Howard board, he helped write a report which significantly restructured the school's administrative procedures. He was also a long-time member of the Council on Foreign Relations and the New York City Bar Association.

=== New York City public school service ===
From 1961 to 1967, Garrison served on the New York City Board of Education, and was its president from 1965 to 1967. In 1961, the New York State Legislature enacted legislation dissolving the existing New York City Public Schools school board and establishing a new, nine-member "reform" Board of Education. On September 18, 1961, New York City Mayor Robert F. Wagner, Jr. appointed Garrison to be a member of the new board. The Board of Education elected Garrison its president and chair on July 21, 1965.

The 67-year-old Garrison was president of the Board of Education during a time of significant change for New York City public schools. In 1961, teachers in the city schools had struck and won the right to form a labor union, and subsequently they elected the United Federation of Teachers to be its collective bargaining representative. Major corruption scandals had also rocked the school system, and for the first time the schools revealed that the quality of education in the system had slipped badly at the same time that white flight had taken most high-performing middle-class students out of the system while large numbers of educationally disadvantaged minority and immigrant children entered it.

Due to his age and declining health, Garrison retired from the Board of Education in the summer of 1967. The city's new Mayor, John Lindsay, appointed Garrison to a Mayor's Advisory Panel on the Decentralization of the New York City Schools. The Advisory Panel recommended extensive devolution of control over the city's public schools to locally elected neighborhood school boards. One locally controlled board in the Ocean Hill-Brownsville neighborhood began violating the union's contract in order to bring in a new teaching staff. This led to three strikes which engulfed the entire city school system. The devolution experiment ended after the strikes. The result was not unsurprising. Garrison had chaired a highly structured public hearing on devolution in 1966. After a local African American woman attempted to speak (even though she was not on the witness list), Garrison ruled her out of order—causing the hearing to dissolve into a near-riot which required police (and for Garrison and the other Board members to scurry out a back door for their own safety).

=== Environmental law case ===
Also in the mid-1960s, Garrison was also involved in a landmark court case on environmental law. In May 1963, the Consolidated Edison energy company proposed constructing a hydroelectric power generating station on top of Storm King Mountain, a famous Hudson River valley landmark. The Scenic Hudson Preservation Conference formed to oppose the project. In March 1965, the Federal Power Commission, which had licensing authority over all hydroelectric projects in the United States, granted approval for the project to proceed. The Scenic Hudson Preservation Conference asked the agency to reconsider, based on the significant environmental impact and harm to scenic vistas the project would create, but the agency refused.

The Scenic Hudson Preservation Conference hired Garrison as its attorney, and he quickly filed suit in a federal court of appeals to stop the project. The court of appeals blocked the project on December 29, 1965, but the energy company appealed to the U.S. Supreme Court. The Supreme Court refused to hear the case, allowing the injunction against the power plant to stand. The decision in Scenic Hudson Preservation Conference v. Federal Power Commission, 354 F.2d 608 (1965), cert. den'd., 384 US 941 (1966), is a landmark case in American environmental law, because it established for the first time that citizens do not need to show economic harm from a project but have standing to sue merely if the project creates environmental and aesthetic harms.

== Death ==
Garrison remained active in his law firm until the end of his life. He died at his home in Manhattan in New York City of a heart failure on October 2, 1991. He was survived by his wife and three children.

The New York City Bar Association established the Lloyd K. Garrison Student Leadership Program after his death. The program awards internships to about 15 students from alternative New York City high schools each year.

== In popular culture ==
In the 2023 film Oppenheimer, directed by Christopher Nolan, Garrison was portrayed by actor Macon Blair.

== Bibliography ==
- Adams, Frank and Horton, Myles. Unearthing Seeds of Fire: The Idea of Highlander. Winston-Salem, N.C.: J.F. Blair, 1975.
- Arnold, Martin. "Koch Keeps Leadership of 'Village' by 164 Votes." The New York Times. June 3, 1964.
- Bennett, Walter. The Lawyer's Myth: Reviving Ideals in the Legal Profession. Chicago, Ill.: University of Chicago Press, 2002.
- Bernstein, Jeremy. Oppenheimer: Portrait of an Enigma. Chicago: Dee, 2004.
- Buder, Leonard. "Garrison to Quit As Schools Head." The New York Times. May 4, 1967.
- Butzel, Albert K. "Garrison, Lloyd K." In The Yale Biographical Dictionary of American Law. Roger K. Newman, ed. New Haven, Conn.: Yale University Press, 2009.
- Cannato, Vincent J. The Ungovernable City: John Lindsay and His Struggle to Save New York. Princeton, N.J.: Recording for the Blind & Dyslexic, 2004.
- Coleman, William T. and Bliss, Donald T. Counsel for the Situation: Shaping the Law to Realize America's Promise. Washington, D.C.: Brookings Institution Press, 2010.
- "Con Ed Will Appear Storm King Rebuff." The New York Times. March 23, 1966.
- Crowell, Paul. "Mayor Appoints 9 Civic Leaders As School Board." The New York Times. September 19, 1961.
- Current Biography Yearbook. New York: H.W. Wilson, 1948.
- Currivan, Gene. "Garrison to Head the School Board." The New York Times. July 9, 1965.
- Daniels, Lee A. "Lloyd K. Garrison, Lawyer, Dies." The New York Times. October 3, 1991.
- Devlin, John C. "Power Plan Stirs Battle On Hudson." The New York Times. May 22, 1963.
- Dorsen, David. "Paul, Weiss, Goldberg—What Kind of Ticket Is That?" New York. April 13, 1970.
- "Ellen Garrison, 96." The New York Times. June 6, 1995.
- "F.P.C. Refuses Rehearing On Plant at Storm King." The New York Times. May 7, 1965.
- "Foes of Storm King Plant Take Battle to U.S Court." The New York Times. July 13, 1965.
- "Frank Says Garrison Will Return As Dean." The New York Times. September 16, 1934.
- Frank, John P. Marble Palace: The Supreme Court in American Life. Westport, Conn.: Greenwood Press 1972.
- Gaines, Kevin Kelly. American Africans in Ghana: Black Expatriates and the Civil Rights Era. Chapell Hill, N.C. University of North Carolina Press, 2006.
- "Garrison Elected School Board Head." The New York Times. July 22, 1965.
- "Garrison Is Put on WLB." Associated Press. January 3, 1944.
- "Garrison Resigns Labor Board Post." The New York Times. October 3, 1934.
- Garrison, Lloyd McKim. "Garrison at Two Hundred: The Family, the Legacy, and the Question of Garrison's Relevance in Contemporary America." In William Lloyd Garrison at Two Hundred: History, Legacy, and Memory. James Brewer Stewart, ed. New Haven, Conn.: Yale University Press, 2008.
- Glassman, Bruce. Arthur Miller. Englewood Cliffs, N.J.: Silver Burdett Press, 1990.
- Glen, John M. Highlander: No Ordinary School. 2d ed. Knoxville, Tenn.: University of Tennessee Press, 1996.
- Graham, Fred P. "Supreme Court Paves Way For New Storm King Test." The New York Times. May 17, 1966.
- Gross, James A. The Making of the National Labor Relations Board: A Study in Economics, Politics, and the Law, 1933-1937. Albany, N.Y.: State University of New York Press, 1974.
- Gross, James A. The Reshaping of the National Labor Relations Board: National Labor Policy in Transition, 1937-1947. Albany, N.Y.: State University of New York Press, 1981.
- Houck, Oliver A. Taking Back Eden: Eight Environmental Cases That Changed the World. Washington, D.C.: Island Press, 2010.
- Hove, Arthur and Biebel, Anne. The University of Wisconsin: A Pictorial History. Madison, Wisc.: University of Wisconsin Press, 1991.
- Hughes, Langston; De Santis, Christopher C. (ed.); Hubbard, Dolan (ed.); and Rampersad, Arnold (ed.) Fight for Freedom and Other Writings on Civil Rights. Columbia, Mo.: University of Missouri Press, 2001.
- Hunt, Richard. "Gains in Primary Claimed For Governor and Mayor." The New York Times. September 7, 1963.
- Kahlenberg, Richard D. Tough Liberal: Albert Shanker and the Battles Over Schools, Unions, Race, and Democracy. New York: Columbia University Press, 2007.
- Kutulas, Judy. The American Civil Liberties Union and the Making of Modern Liberalism: 1930-1960. Chapel Hill, N.C.: University of North Carolina Press, 2006.
- "Labor: Majority Tool." Time. September 10, 1934.
- Lewis, Anthony. "House Unit Asks Miller Citation." The New York Times. July 11, 1956.
- Liman, Arthur L. and Israel, Peter. Lawyer: A Life of Counsel and Controversy. New York: PublicAffairs, 1998.
- Markmann, Charles Lam. The Noblest Cry: A History of the American Civil Liberties Union. New York: St. Martin's Press, 1965.
- "Mediation Fails, Steel Board Quits." The New York Times. June 30, 1937.
- "Miller and Nathan Disavow Contempt." The New York Times. March 2, 1957.
- "Miller Declines to Identify Reds." United Press International. July 8, 1956.
- Morris, Charles. The Blue Eagle at Work: Reclaiming Democratic Rights in the American Workplace. Ithaca, N.Y.: Cornell University Press, 2004.
- Morris, Jeffrey Brandon and Martin, George Whitney. Making Sure We Are True to Our Founders: The Association of the Bar of the City of New York, 1970-95. New York: Fordham University Press, 1997.
- Nakaya, Andrea C. The Environment. Detroit: Greenhaven Press, 2006.
- "Names Garrison to WLB." The New York Times. February 10, 1944.
- "New Guggenheim Awards." The New York Times. April 28, 1938.
- "New Labor Board Starts Its Work." The New York Times. July 10, 1934.
- Newfield, Jack and Barrett, Wayne. City for Sale: Ed Koch and the Betrayal of New York. New York: Harper & Row, 1988.
- Newman, Roger K. Hugo Black: A Biography. New York: Fordham University Press, 1997.
- Niehoff, Richard O. Floyd W. Reeves: Innovative Educator and Distinguished Practitioner of the Art of Public Administration. Lanham, Md.: University Press of America, 1991.
- Parrish, Michael E. Citizen Rauh: An American Liberal's Life in Law and Politics. Ann Arbor, Wisc.: University of Michigan Press, 2010.
- Phillips, McCandlish. "Con Ed's Project on Hudson Fought." The New York Times. July 26, 1964.
- Polenberg, Richard. In the Matter of J. Robert Oppenheimer: The Security Clearance Hearing. Ithaca, N.Y.: Cornell University Press, 2002.
- "Powers of Board Defined in Order." The New York Times. June 18, 1937.
- "President Names Labor Alternates." The New York Times. January 27, 1942.
- Rampersad, Arnold. The Life of Langston Hughes: 1941-1967, I Dream a World. New York: Oxford University Press, 2002.
- Ranzal, Edward. "Storm King Plant Blocked By Court." The New York Times. December 30, 1965.
- Ravitch, Diane. The Great School Wars: A History of the New York City Public Schools. Baltimore, Md.: Johns Hopkins University Press, 2000.
- "Rotating Chairman Proposed on Labor." Associated Press. January 7, 1942.
- Rothschild, Carl, C. and Burnap, Robert L. "Con Ed on Hudson Opposed." The New York Times. February 15, 1964.
- Russell, Dick. Striper Wars: An American Fish Story. Washington, D.C.: Island Press/Shearwater Books, 2005.
- Russell Sage Foundation. Lawyers and the Promotion of Justice. Brattleboro, Vt.: E.L. Hildreth & Co., 1938.
- Schwartz, Joel. The New York Approach: Robert Moses, Urban Liberals, and Redevelopment of the Inner City. Columbus, Ohio: Ohio State University Press, 1993.
- Stark, Louis. "Mills Are Assailed." The New York Times. June 25, 1937.
- "Steel Mediators Trained in Labor Troubles." The New York Times. June 18, 1937.
- Stern, Philip M.; Green, Harold P.; and Garrison, Lloyd K. The Oppenheimer Case: Security on Trial. New York: Harper & Row, 1969.
- Taylor, Clarence and Galamison, Milton A. Knocking at Our Own Door: Milton A. Galamison and the Struggle to Integrate New York City Schools. Lanham, Md.: Lexington Books, 2001.
- Tomlins, Christopher. The State and the Unions: Labor Relations, Law, and the Organized Labor Movement in America, 1880-1960. Reprint ed. New York: Cambridge University Press, 1985.
- Trussell, C.P. "Dashiell Hammett Silent At Inquiry." The New York Times. March 27, 1953.
- "T.W. Kheel Named Director of WLB." The New York Times. January 2, 1944.
- Van Alstyne, Jr., W. Scott. "The University of Wisconsin Law School 1868-1968: An Outline History." Wisconsin Law Review. 1968:321 (1968).
- Weaver, Jr., Warren. "F.P.C., 3-1, Grants Con Ed a License for Hudson Plant." The New York Times. March 10, 1965.
- Who's Who in Labor. New York: Dryden Press, 1946.
