= Charles Morris (legal educator) =

American legal scholar

Charles J. Morris is an American legal scholar who is the professor of law emeritus at the Dedman School of Law at Southern Methodist University in Dallas, Texas. He is an internationally renowned labor law scholar and authority on the National Labor Relations Act.

== Education ==
Morris attended Rice University, the University of Chicago, and Washington and Lee University before earning a Bachelor of Arts degree from Temple University through the Army Specialized Training Program. He later earned a Bachelor of Laws from Columbia Law School.

== Career ==
Morris joined the Dedman School of Law in 1966. In 2005, he initiated a major discussion within the American labor movement with the publication of his book The Blue Eagle at Work: Reclaiming Democratic Rights in the American Workplace. Morris argued that in the absence of a union representing a majority of the employees in a workplace, the National Labor Relations Act requires an employer to bargain with a union that represents only a minority number of the employees. Morris argued that such "members-only bargaining" was once common practice in the United States, and he suggests that "members-only bargaining" should be used to jump-start the union organizing. Morris' conclusions have generated considerable controversy.

On August 14, 2007, seven American labor unions asked the National Labor Relations Board to force employers to bargain with their member-only unions, even though the unions represent a minority number of workers. The case is seen as a major test of Morris' "Blue Eagle" legal theory.

Morris is the author of three books and a large number of articles. He is a member of the national advisory board of the Berkeley Journal of Employment and Labor Law.

== Personal life ==
Now retired, Morris lives in San Diego, California.

== Published works ==
- How the Working Class Can Help the Middle Class: Reintroducing Non-Majority Collective Bargaining to the American Workplace. Lake Mary, FL: Vandeplas Publishing, 2019. ISBN 978-1-60042-483-0
- The Blue Eagle At Work: Reclaiming Democratic Rights In The American Workplace. Ithaca, N.Y.: ILR Press, 2004. ISBN 0-8014-4317-2
- American Labor Policy: A Critical Appraisal of the National Labor Relations Act. Washington, D.C.: BNA Books, 1987. ISBN 0-87179-532-9
- Developing Labor Law: The Board, The Courts, and the National Labor Relations Act. Washington, D.C.: BNA Books, 1983. ISBN 0-87179-405-5
