= Blue Mountain Eagle =

Blue Mountain Eagle may refer to:

- Blue Mountain Eagle (band), an American rock band of the late 1960s-early 1970s
- Blue Mountain Eagle (newspaper), a newspaper published in John Day, Oregon, United States
