= Leo Wolman =

American economist (1890–1961)

- Born: February 24, 1890; Baltimore, Maryland, U.S.
- Died: October 2, 1961 (aged 71); New York City, New York, U.S.
- Occupation: Economist
- Known for: Labor economist, public service

Leo Wolman (February 24, 1890 – October 2, 1961) was a noted American economist whose work focused on labor economics. He also served on a number of important boards and commissions for the federal government.

== Early life ==
Wolman was born in Baltimore, Maryland, in 1890 to Morris and Yetta (Wachsman) Wolman, first generation Polish-Jewish immigrants to the United States. He attended Johns Hopkins University, receiving his A.B. degree in 1911 and his Ph.D. in political economy in 1913.

After receiving his doctorate, Wolman worked as a special agent for the Commission on Industrial Relations, a U.S. federal government commission which investigated industrial working conditions in the United States from 1912 to 1915. Returning to academia after the Commission ended its work, he taught at Hobart College, Johns Hopkins University, and the University of Michigan. After the United States entered World War I in 1917, he served on the Council of National Defense (a U.S. federal government agency which advised the President on economic production issues) and later was appointed head of the section on production statistics of the War Industries Board. In 1919, he served six months with the American Peace Mission which negotiated the Treaty of Versailles.

== Academic and public career ==
Returning to the U.S. in late 1919, Wolman joined the faculty at the New School for Social Research, where he remained for 19 years. In 1920, he became director of research for the Amalgamated Clothing Workers Union (ACWU), resigning in 1931. In 1922 he was elected as a Fellow of the American Statistical Association. During this time, he was a director of the Amalgamated Bank of Chicago and the Amalgamated Bank of New York, banks owned by the ACWU, and Amalgamated Investors, Inc., an ACWU-owned investment trust. He became a freelance researcher for the National Bureau of Economic Research (NBER) in the mid-1920s, and formally joined the staff in 1931, directing its labor research programs and in time becoming director-at-large for research. A number of studies he authored for NBER became the subject of national attention and debate, including a 1925, he report on the size and strength of labor unions in the United States, a 1929 study on changes in patterns of consumption and the effect on standards of living, and a 1930 report on the role of public works in helping reduce unemployment. Although he increasingly disassociated himself from the labor movement after the early 1930s, he still supported unions in certain circumstances. For example, he was one of many educators who signed an open letter denouncing violence against labor union members in the "Harlan County War" in 1932.

He was appointed a lecturer at Harvard University in 1930. But in 1931, he was appointed a full professor of economics at Columbia University, remaining there until his retirement in 1958. Wesley Clair Mitchell, a highly influential economist and colleague at NBER, lobbied heavily for Wolman to be added to the faculty.

Wolman was a member of several academic societies, namely the American Academy of Arts and Sciences and the American Philosophical Society.

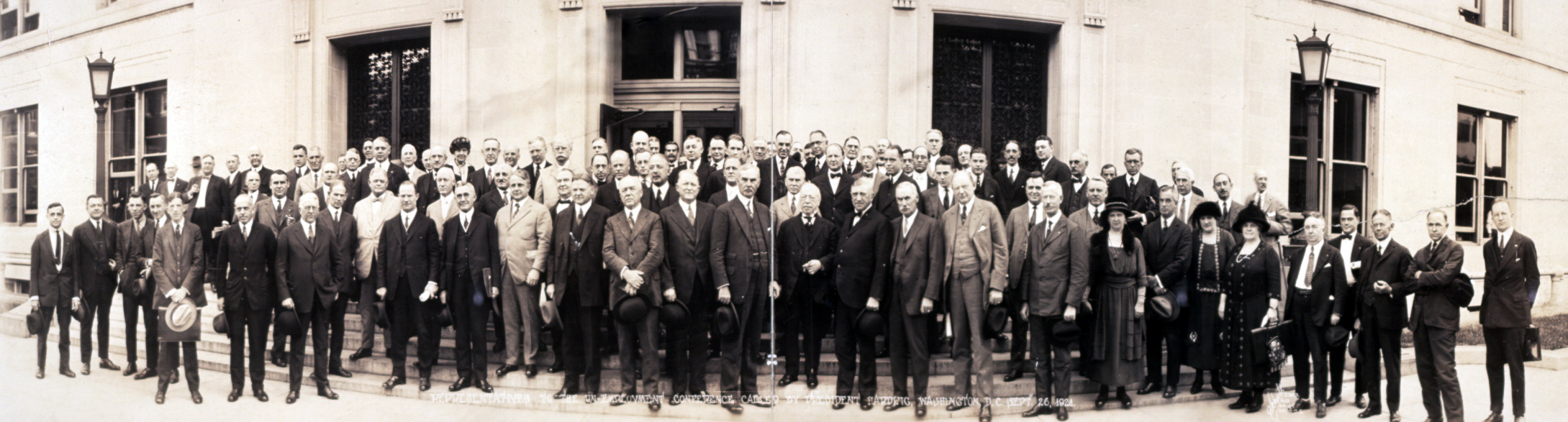
Leo Wolman and other representatives to the 1921 Conference on Unemployment.

His association with the trade union movement led to a lengthy career in government service. In 1921, Secretary of Commerce Herbert Hoover appointed Wolman to the Conference on Unemployment, a federal conference charged with studying unemployment during the Post-World War I recession. His service led to additional work for labor unions. Wolman helped the ACWU negotiate unemployment benefits for its members in the mid-1920s, and with the onset of the Great Depression he was lecturing union audiences on unemployment in 1930. Governor of New York Franklin D. Roosevelt appointed him in October 1930 to a committee to recommend solutions to the unemployment problem facing that state, and he was chair of a seven-state commission on unemployment in 1931. He became a strong advocate for federal unemployment insurance, and co-authored a major study of European economies in 1932 which linked dropping standards of living to lack of unemployment benefits.

=== National Recovery Administration ===
In June 1933, Wolman was appointed to the staff of the National Recovery Administration (NRA), which led to a critical role in the regulation of labor relations. His initial appointment was as an expert on labor to NRA Administrator Hugh S. Johnson in the industrial section. Four days later, Labor Secretary Francis Perkins appointed him chair of the NRA Labor Advisory Board, with authority to meet with the NRA Industry Advisory Board and representatives of labor and industry to set codes for minimum wages and maximum hours of work and to establish fair trade practices. On August 1, 1933, Wolman was appointed (along the Hugh S. Johnson and Deputy NRA Administrator Nelson Slater) to a board to mediate disputes arising under the newly approved cotton textile code. Three days later, Wolman and Walter C. Teagle, chair of the NRA's Industry Advisory Board, established (with President Roosevelt's agreement) the National Labor Board (NLB) to help resolve strikes and other industrial disputes arising under NRA codes. The National Labor Board was led by Senator Robert F. Wagner, and Wolman was one of six members appointed to the Board on August 5.

Less than a week later, Wolman (acting as chair of the NLB while Senator Wagner was overseas) and the other members of the NLB established a key policy of New Deal labor policy. The Full-Fashioned Hosiery Workers Union launched an organizing drive in the summer of 1933 in the silk stocking mills around Reading, Pennsylvania. The employers refused to recognize the union, and 10,000 workers went on strike. On August 10, 1933, the NLB mediated a settlement. Known as the "Reading Formula," the settlement consisted of four parts: (1) That the union call off the strike; (2) That all employees be rehired immediately, without retaliation; (3) That the NLB hold elections in which the workers would vote by secret ballot for their own representatives, and that both parties would negotiate a collective bargaining agreement covering wages, hours and working conditions; and (4) That in the event of any disagreement on any matter, the parties would submit the dispute to the NLB for binding arbitration. The "Reading Formula" proved useful in settling large numbers of labor disputes, including strikes in silk mills in Paterson, New Jersey; silk mills in Allentown, Pennsylvania; tool and die factories in Detroit, Michigan; and coal mines in Illinois. By the end of August, however, the "Reading Formula" was being opposed by employers, whose company unions were losing representational elections to worker-controlled unions. Wolman and Teagle, chairmen of the NRA's Labor Advisory Board and Industry Advisory Board (respectively), worked out an agreement to accommodate industry concerns regarding implementation of Section 7(a) of the National Industrial Recovery Act, but President Roosevelt rejected this agreement on September 15. But the situation deteriorated through December, to the point where major employers were not longer taking their labor disputes to the Board. To strengthen the NLB's powers vis-a-vis employers, President Roosevelt issued Executive Order 6511 on December 16, 1933. The order ratified the Board's prior activities, including its decisions and representational elections. The order also authorized the Board to "settle by mediation, conciliation or arbitration all controversies between employers and employees which tend to impede the purpose of the National Industrial Recovery Act." But E.O. 6511 said nothing about elections, and did not address the Board's enforcement powers. Roosevelt issued a new order, E.O. 6580, on February 1, 1934. The order gave the Board explicit power to authorize, upon a showing by a substantial number of employees, representational elections to determine majority status, and appeared to give the winning organization exclusive representation for employees in the bargaining unit (although this interpretation was widely contested). Upset with the increasingly regulatory approach being taken toward national labor relations policy, Wolman attempted to resign from the NLB on February 24, 1934, but was persuaded by Roosevelt, Johnson and Wagner to withdraw his resignation.

The NLB's interpretation of Section 7(a), however, increasing diverged from that espoused by Johnson. On March 1, 1934, the Board issued its decision in Denver Tramway Corporation. The Board held that, where a union had obtained a majority of the votes cast in a government-sponsored representational election, any collective bargaining agreement would have to cover all employees in the bargaining unit. Until Denver Tramway, unions had bargained only for their own members. A union which represented only half the bus drivers in a company, for example, would bargain a contract only on behalf of its members. Another union could represent the other bus drivers. In many cases, several unions represented the same workers in one company, each union bargaining a different contract for however many members it represented. Denver Tramway was a major turning point in American labor law because it established the rule of exclusive representation. This rule said that a union which won the majority of votes in an election would win the right to represent all workers. Even when several unions competed against one another and no union won a majority of the votes, the union with the most votes still won the right to represent all workers.

=== Auto Labor Board ===
Wolman also played a major role in the initial organizing of the automotive manufacturing industry.

The American Federation of Labor (AFL) had attempted to organize auto workers since the early 1920s with little success. After the passage of the National Industrial Recovery Act in June 1933, the AFL again spearheaded a major drive in automobile manufacturing, this time organizing workers into federal labor unions. By March, more than 32,000 workers (representing about 17 percent of the total automotive manufacturing workforce) had been organized. On March 4, 1934, auto workers at Buick, Fisher Body, and Hudson voted to strike unless the employers recognized their unions, rehired all workers fired for union activity, and raised wages 20 percent. The AFL had accepted severe restrictions on union organizing in the auto industry code (accepted by the government in early fall 1933), did not do much organizing under the code, utilized craft rather than industrial organizers whose main role appeared to be to suppress worker militancy rather than organize unions, and acquiesced when Hugh S. Johnson reinterpreted Section 7(a) in February 1934 to require proportional rather than exclusive representation. Worried that the auto worker unions might actually strike, the AFL negotiated with the government to find a way to avoid a strike.

With Wolman's support, NLB Chairman Wagner intervened in the strike on March 6. AFL President William Green sought a compromise under which auto workers would be able to air their grievances and company unions would be banned but no additional organizing rights would be sought. Wolman, who had long supported company unions, pressed for the retention of these entities as a means of giving workers a voice during the Great Depression without empowering unions (which he felt would overreach themselves and inhibit economic recovery). The strike deadline passed without any action as talks continued. For a time the talks seemed to be making progress, but when the automakers refused to deal with the NLB President Roosevelt intervened personally in the negotiations. The strike was postponed to give the President time to broker a deal. Relying heavily on Wolman's advice, Roosevelt negotiated a deal on March 23, but the deal collapsed and negotiations resumed. At Wolman's suggestion, Roosevelt agreed on March 25 to establish an Automobile Labor Board which endorsed Johnson's reinterpretation of the auto industry code of February 1934 and would hear grievances and cases of discrimination against workers.

Wolman was appointed the chair of the Automobile Labor Board (ALB) the next day. But Wolman refused to bar company unions, and from the ALB's outset unions complained that they did not get a fair hearing from Wolman. Wolman proceeded to implement a plan to hold a series of elections throughout the auto industry beginning in late 1934. But the disenchanted AFL withdrew from the ALB on December 13, 1934. Wolman and the ALB proceeded with the elections all the same, and although only about 19,000 workers had elected to form unions a plan was drawn up in April 1935 to guide the anticipated collective bargaining process.

== Later career ==
On May 27, 1935, the Supreme Court of the United States held in Schechter Poultry Corp. v. United States, 295 U.S. 495 (1935) that Title I of the National Industrial Recovery Act of 1933 was unconstitutional. The passage of the National Labor Relations Act into law on July 5, 1935, abolished the ALB. These two events led to the end of Wolman's career as a public servant, as President Roosevelt did not appoint him to any new positions in government.

Wolman returned to the faculty at Columbia University. He repeatedly voiced strong criticism of the new National Labor Relations Act, and argued that organized labor's goal was totalitarian control over the economy. His criticisms of labor unions led directly to the passage of the Taft-Hartley Act in 1947, and he testified before the Senate Banking and Currency Committee in 1949 on the monopolistic practices of trade unions.

He also became a strong critic of the New Deal. On June 3, 1936, he co-authored a letter with Newton D. Baker and Lewis Williams Douglas which appeared in The New York Times and which attacked the New Deal as dictatorial and communist. The letter was widely condemned as self-contradictory, and largely ignored in the nation's capital. He argued that the federal minimum wage laws, unemployment benefits, eight-hour day rules, and overtime requirements hindered economic recovery.

Wolman died at Mount Sinai Hospital in New York City on October 2, 1961, after a long illness. He was survived by his wife, Cecil (Clark) Wolman, and his son, Eric.

== Support for Jews in Palestine ==
In the 1920s, Wolman became active in supporting Jews in Palestine. He issued a report on ways to improve economic conditions in the area, and joined the newly formed Friends of Palestine in 1929 to support Jewish institutions of culture and higher education in the region. He was listed in the annual "who's who" of influential Jewish leaders in 1931.
