= The Blue Eagle at Work =

2005 legal treatise written by Charles J. Morris

The Blue Eagle at Work: Reclaiming Democratic Rights in the American Workplace
- Author: Charles J. Morris
- Subject: Labor relations in the United States
- Published: 2005 (Cornell University Press)
- ISBN: 0-8014-4317-2

The Blue Eagle at Work: Reclaiming Democratic Rights in the American Workplace is a legal treatise written by Charles J. Morris which analyzes collective bargaining under the National Labor Relations Act (NLRA), the federal statute governing most private sector labor relations in the United States. Published in 2005 by Cornell University Press, the text claims that the NLRA guarantees that employees under that Act have the right to bargain collectively through minority unions—but only on a members-only basis—in workplaces where there is not an established majority union, notwithstanding that the present practice and general understanding of the law is that only majority-union employees are entitled to engage in collective bargaining on an exclusivity basis. Contracts resulting from such minority-union bargaining would apply to union members only, not to other employees.

== Structure of the book ==
The Blue Eagle At Work contains three parts: 1) An overview of collective bargaining law in the U.S.; 2) The legal framework in which members-only collective bargaining could occur; and 3) How unions could implement and strengthen members-only collective bargaining and use it as a strategic organizing tool.

=== Part I ===
Part I of the book addresses collective bargaining law in the United States. It is broken down into four chapters.

Chapter One provides a historical overview of the rise of membership-based collective bargaining in the period prior to federal recognition of the right to bargain collectively, the provisions of the Norris-LaGuardia Act, and the enactment and legal meaning of Section 7(a) of the National Industrial Recovery Act (NIRA). Attention is paid to The Conference Board survey of labor relations conducted in November 1933. Morris points out that the survey results indicate that members-only recognition and bargaining were common when the NLRA was enacted.

Chapter Two provides an in-depth and exceedingly detailed history of legislative attempts to enact improvements in federal labor law. The chapter provides an extensive analysis of the nine legislative drafts of Senator Robert F. Wagner (D-NY) for his 1934 bill. The chapter also discusses the implementation of the NIRA under first the National Recovery Administration (NRA) and then the National Labor Board and the National Labor Relations Board (NLRB). Morris documents how the concepts of representational exclusivity and majoritarianism were developed in cases such as Denver Tramway Corporation, 1 NLB 63 (1934) and Houde Engineering Corp., 1 NLRB (old) 35 (1934) and cites cases showing that employers refusing to bargain with a minority union violated the NIRA.

Chapter Three is an extensive consideration of the legislative history of Wagner Act. The three drafts of the Act, committee hearings, floor debates, and committee reports are closely examined to tease out the meanings of the changes made. Morris uncovered one feature that required no teasing, a "smoking gun" that shows that congress clearly intended that collective bargaining would not be confined to majority unions only, to wit, the deliberate rejection of a version of the duty-to-bargain contained in Section 8(a)(5) that would have so confined the bargaining process. Instead, the present wording, which does not so limit the bargaining obligation, was selected. Morris notes that the Senate committee and debate statements disparaging minority or plurality bargaining all referred to bargaining after a majority representative had been chosen. None referred to bargaining before majority selection, which was not a controversial issue.

Chapter Four contains the history of members-only minority-union organizing and bargaining during the decade following passage of the NLRA and what followed. Morris notes:

For several years following the passage of the Wagner Act in 1935, there was never any legal question raised as to the scope of its bargaining requirements, either as to minority-union members-only bargaining or majority-union exclusivity bargaining. Both types of bargaining had prevailed earlier under the Blue Eagle administration of Section 7(a) of the NIRA and both were now widely accepted under the new NLRA.

Morris points to the organizing history of the Steel Workers Organizing Committee and United Auto Workers as prime examples of members-only organizing and collective bargaining, and cites statistics from Bureau of National Affairs (BNA) and Twentieth Century Fund reports which document the widespread use and acceptance of members-only contracts.

Morris concludes that several factors led unions to become dependent on representational elections. The NLRB itself favored representational elections, "for they provided a relatively simple pattern for bargaining-unit determinations, conduct of elections, and certification of majorities for exclusive union representation." The conflict between the American Federation of Labor and the Congress of Industrial Organizations refocused attention away from organizing. The rapid expansion of unions during World War II and the massive waves of strikes which came after the war continued to divert attention away from organizing. Morris also argues that the Taft-Hartley Act led to "the phenomenon of unions becoming busily engaged in a multitude of legal defensive actions generated by the numerous union restrictions that the new law had created."

"As a consequence," Morris concludes, "only a few years after Taft-Hartley, the NLRB and its union and employer constituents were routinely viewing majority-union bargaining—which was certainly the ultimate goal intended by the Act—as the only bargaining contemplated by the Act. Although unions had originally favored NLRB elections out of sheer convenience, their reliance on the election process had now become routine, with attendant misunderstanding of the true scope of bargaining offered by the statute. ... Thus was born the latter-day conventional wisdom that assumes that majority-union representation is the sine qua non of collective bargaining."

=== Part II ===
Part II of The Blue Eagle At Work examines the legal interpretation of Sections 1, 7, 8(a)(1), 8(a)(3), 8(a)(5), and 9(a) of the NLRA, and concludes that Morris' construction of the law is consistent with the statutory requirements and also with existing legal rulings and treaty obligations. Part II consists of five chapters.

Chapter Five engages in a Plain-Meaning-Rule construction of the language of Section 7(a) and the NLRA. Morris examines Section 7, Section 8(a)(1), Section 9(a), and Section 8(a)(5) of the NLRB for their plain meaning, and concludes they guarantee the right of all employees to bargain collectively, whether before or after majority-union designation. Bargaining before such selection must be for members-only through a union of the employees' choice; bargaining after majority selection must be for all employees in the bargaining unit through the selected union only. This chapter provides the heart of Morris' thesis, for although it is supported by legislative history (and constitutional and international law), its primary basis is contained in the unambiguous text of the statute. The critical language is short, simple, and of clear meaning. Fourteen words in Section 7, borrowed verbatim from Section 7(a) of the NIRA, provide that "Employees shall have the right...to bargain collectively through representatives of their own choosing...." This is guaranteed and enforced by Section 8(a)(1) and reinforced by Section 8(a)(5) (which by its clear wording and its "smoking gun" legislative history requires bargaining both before and after majority selection). The only limitation on this bargaining right is a conditional limitation on the choice of representatives, but not on the duty to bargain. This limitation is contained in Section 9(a) which does not operate unless there is a majority representative, in which event the selected majority union becomes the exclusive representative. Morris points out that both the Supreme Court and the NLRB have approved minority and members only bargaining and resulting members-only contracts where they exist voluntarily, and that the time is now ripe for a decision confirming that such bargaining is enforceable where there is not yet a majority representative. This universal concept of collective bargaining conforms to the "policy of the United States" expressed in Section 1 of the Act, which policy was expressly reconfirmed in the Taft-Hartley Act.

Chapter Six examines several rulings by the Supreme Court which are often cited as supportive of majority-only collective bargaining. Morris reviews the First Amendment guarantee of freedom of association, and how the concepts of indirect state action (as elucidated in NAACP v. Alabama, 357 U.S. 449 (1958), and Bates v. City of Little Rock, 361 U.S. 516 (1960), and the test of indirect state action as outlined in Lugar v. Edmondson Oil Co., 457 U.S. 922 (1982)), direct state action and compelling government interest protect and affirm members-only minority-union collective bargaining. Morris also discusses three key Supreme Court rulings—NLRB v. Catholic Bishop of Chicago, 440 U.S. 490 (1979), Edward J. DeBartolo Corp. v. Florida Gulf Coast Building & Constr. Trades Council, 485 U.S. 568 (1988) and Communications Workers of America v. Beck, 487 U.S. 735 (1988)—and concludes that they conform to the concept of members-only bargaining as well.

In Chapter Seven, Morris discusses how the Supreme Court's doctrine of "administrative deference" (outlined in Chevron U.S.A., Inc. v. Natural Resources Defense Council, Inc., 467 U.S. 837 (1984)) could provide another avenue for judicial articulation of his thesis. Although it is a basic premise of his book that the defined duty to bargain is mandatory under the Act, if the NLRB were to find the applicable language ambiguous it could and should exercise its discretionary authority and require bargaining in accordance with the thesis—which under step two of the Chevron doctrine would be confirmed by a reviewing federal court even if the court were in disagreement, for the determination would not be "arbitrary, capricious, or manifestly contrary to the statute."

In Chapter Eight, Morris outlines U.S. obligations under international law. He points out that the International Covenant on Civil and Political Rights and the International Labour Organization's 1998 Declaration of Fundamental Principles and Rights at Work both compel a construction of the NLRA which protects members-only collective bargaining.

Chapter Nine discusses the current state of NLRB and court rulings which might appear to exclude members-only minority-union collective bargaining. Morris identifies eight "false majority" cases in which the NLRB or a court appears to rule out bargaining with a minority union, but in each of those cases the union was either directly or indirectly seeking to represent the entire bargaining unit as a Section 9(a) majority representative, hence the designation of "false-majority" cases; in none of them did the union actually engage in members-only representation and bargaining. Morris also dismisses four "group-dealing" cases, in which the question was whether an employer has a duty to meet and bargain with groups of nonunion employees under the "mutual aid or protection" language of Section 7. But once more, Morris distinguishes the cases by noting that in none of the cases did the union engage in members-only representation or bargaining as defined by the "collective bargaining" language of Section 7, which is the text that provides minority unions with the right to bargain.

=== Part III ===
The three chapters of Part III discuss how unions might go about reaffirming the right to engage in members-only minority-union collective bargaining.

Chapter Ten discusses using the NLRB and the courts to reaffirm the minority-union concept. Morris outlines how unions might use NLRB representational procedures or direct court rulings to revitalize the concept of members-only unions. Morris also discusses novel approaches, such as direct legal action against the NLRB's General Counsel and picketing for members-only recognition. Other approaches he suggests include amending a Section 8(a)(3) complaint (made to the NLRB when an employee is discharged for engaging in protected union activity, a fairly common occurrence in NLRB representation elections) to establish the fact of members-only unionization and to force the employer to bargain. He also advocates petitioning the NLRB to engage in administrative rulemaking on the subject, which is the process now pending before the Board in two rulemaking petitions.

Chapter Eleven discussed how unions should establish members-only minority unions. Morris discussed the role of the union steward, Weingarten rights, employer notification, and how to force employers to engage in collective bargaining.

Chapter Twelve concludes the work with a vision of industrial democracy. Morris argues that members-only unions represent the best way to revitalize the American labor movement. He outlines how workplace democracy is stunted without collective bargaining, argues that productivity is greatly enhanced when unions exist, and that strong unions strengthen social capital inside and outside the workplace.

=== Appendices ===
The book contains two substantive appendices. The first is an appendix to Chapter Two. It contains all the relevant provisions of the proposed 1934 "Labor Disputes" bill and the proposed 1934 "National Adjustment Bill" substitute for S. 2926. Both proposed bills are crucial to understanding the evolving concept of collective bargaining which led to the Wagner Act.

The second appendix is meant to accompany Chapter Three. This appendix contains all relevant portions of the 1935 drafts of the National Labor Relations Act (S. 1958). The drafts provide the critical textual evidence for Morris' legislative history and plain-meaning interpretive arguments.

== Scholarly history ==
The scholarly pedigree of The Blue Eagle At Work is somewhat lengthy. Although many in the labor movement saw the treatise as novel, the concept, as Morris noted, was recognized in a law review article as early as 1936 and was discussed generally as early as 1975. Morris himself published an early version of his thesis in 1994. But the most prominent and complete statement of the legal theory came from Professor Clyde Summers in 1990 (which Morris acknowledges in his book).

The "Blue Eagle" concept of members-only unions has received additional attention since the early 1990s. Legal scholars addressed the merits of the theory, and discussed its application to a variety of other "pre-union" organizations such as worker centers.

== Reviews ==
The Blue Eagle At Work was highly anticipated by many labor scholars, labor attorneys and activists in the labor movement. After its publication, the work was widely reviewed in the scholarly and labor press, including Labor Studies Journal, the Journal of Industrial Relations, WorkingUSA, Labor History, Berkeley Journal of Employment and Labor Law, Employee Rights and Employment Policy Journal, LRA Online, Labor Research Association, British Journal of Industrial Relations, Relations Industrielles/Industrial Relations, Hawaii Laborer, ILCA Online, Portside, The Progressive Populist, Workday Minnesota, Religious Socialism, All Aboard, NLRB, Labour/Le Travail, Noteworthy Books in Industrial Relations and Labor Economics, Princeton University, Benson's Union Democracy Blog, University of Pennsylvania Journal of Business and Employment Law, and the Annual Review of Law and Social Science. Some of the reviews expressed greater or lesser degrees of skepticism about the likelihood of Morris' thesis being adopted but praised the work highly.

One reviewer wrote:

There is the potential for private-sector US industrial relations to undergo the biggest change since 1947, or even 1935--all without any new laws or overturning any legal precedents. Not only will many workers obtain union representation when a majority of their co-workers are not interested, but the entire industrial relations environment might be altered. Morris shows how Senator Wagner--the father of the NLRA--viewed minority-unionism as a stepping stone to full-fledged majority unionism, especially as the benefits of union representation are vividly demonstrated to skeptical co-workers. The organizing process can thus change as unions can focus their attention on building organizations rather than winning elections.

== Legal analysis ==
The book was widely praised for its scholarship. "[It] is a remarkably compelling, innovative stroke, one which should be taken very seriously by those who wish to see any kind of renaissance for workers' collective power," wrote one reviewer, whose assessment was typical.

Almost all of the labor law professors who have publicly commented on the members-only minority-union bargaining thesis have agreed that the Morris thesis is legally correct. Twenty-five of those professors joined in a letter to the NLRB on August 14, 2007, endorsing the rulemaking petition that was proposing adoption of such a rule. They stated to the Board that

(A) The plain and unambiguous language of the Act guarantees that in workplaces where there is not currently a Section 9(a) majority-exclusive representative in an appropriate bargaining unit, employees have an enforceable right to bargain collectively through minority unions of their own choosing, but for their employee members only.

(B) Such reading of the statute is fully supported by clear and consistent legislative history.

Nevertheless, Morris' theory has been challenged. Although a few of the reviewers disagreed with some of Morris' secondary conclusions, none disagreed with his critical reading of the statutory language on which he relies. One supportive reviewer, Judge John True, wrote: "Nothing in the actual language of the NLRA, in its legislative history, in NLRB or court cases, in the constitution, in international law, or indeed in common sense or sound policy suggests that unions could not still use this 'members-only' bargaining approach." He reads the language of Section 7 as "all inclusive," explaining that

It does not by its terms limit in any way the rights it confers, including "activities for the purpose of collective bargaining," to those who have designated a union as their exclusive representative. The clear language of the statute confers this right on all employees. So as a matter of simple logic, a minority group of employees is entitled to engage in "activities for the purpose of collective bargaining:" including, presumably, the right to make their employer respond to its bargaining demands.

Morris never denied, indeed emphasized, that the ultimate objective of the Act was majority-based collective bargaining. Nevertheless, minority-union bargaining was always protected as a stepping-stone stage of bargaining that could be expected to lead to majority bargaining, which is exactly what happened during the decade following passage of the Act. None of the facts reported by historian Tomlins, on whom one historical criticism was erroneously based indicated the contrary; indeed The Blue Eagle at Work cited Tomlins.

=== Legislative history and statutory text ===
Morris' interpretation of the NLRA's legislative history and statutory text has come under fire from one scholar in a brief review in a Canadian journal. He presented his opposing opinion, but without any explanatory analysis or cited authority, as follows:

Morris's argument involves close reading of the pre-NLRA administrative cases, and then the successive drafts of the NLRA. ... I was not convinced. While I agree that the NLRB should have required employers to meet with organizations representing only a fraction of their workforce, I do not find a clear Congressional command that requires the Board to do so. Morris shows that, at several stages in the drafting process, such clear language was briefly part of the bill, but was later deleted as part of a general process of simplifying language and delegating detail to the new NLRB. Drafters similarly rejected a proposal that would clearly have restricted the duty to bargain to majority representatives. I read this history to mean that Congress delegated this issue, along with many others, to the new NLRB.

One need only read the statute, however, with or without this history, to conclude that because of the lack of ambiguity in the language, step one of the Chevron doctrine mandates that "[i]f the intent of Congress is clear, that is the end of the matter; for the court, as well as the agency, must give effect to the unambiguously expressed intent of Congress." The pending rulemaking petition by the Steelworkers Union, et al., now awaiting the NLRB's decision, also notes the following regarding the clear statutory language on which the Morris thesis is based:

in workplaces where the majority/unit condition in Section 9(a) is not activated, the text of the Act guarantees that employees shall have the right to bargain collectively through a minority-union of their choice on a nonexclusive, i.e., members-only, basis; and an employer who refuses to bargain collectively with that union commits an unfair labor practice in violation of Sections 8(a)(1) and 8(a)(5). This statutory text is not Humpty-Dumpty language that naysayers might say means whatever they "choose it to mean." Rather, it is plain, unambiguous language that means exactly what it says--the same kind of broad and sweeping language that Chief Justice John Roberts referred to when, as a judge on the District of Columbia Circuit Court of Appeals, he accurately observed in two separate decisions that "[t]he Supreme Court has consistently instructed that statutes written in broad, sweeping language should be given broad, sweeping application."

Additional evidence indicates that the Congress did intend the NLRA to protect members-only unions, particularly the historical "smoking gun" of Congress having rejected specific language that would have limited bargaining to Section 9(a) majority unions only.

=== The "false majority" cases ===
Morris' discussion of the "false majority" cases has also been criticized. In a somewhat laudatory piece, Judge John True concluded that Morris read too much into otherwise ambiguous decisions:

A number of the other cases [Morris] characterizes as "false majority" claims feature ambiguities similar to Mooresville Cotton Mills. To be sure, none of them squarely disposes of Morris' interpretation, but neither does any seem like the "myth" and dicta that he says stand in the way of minority bargaining rights.

However, in a response article, Morris pointed out the errors in Judge True's reading of the Moorsville Cotton Mills case.

=== Constitutional and international law commentary ===
Although Morris bases his thesis on the text of the NLRA, which is supported by legislative history, he also contends that constitutional and international law provide additional support. Some have argued that Morris' constitutional arguments based on freedom of association are not valid under current case law. One commentator takes issue with Morris' claim that collective bargaining under the NLRA constitutes direct or indirect state action, and also points out that Morris' reliance on international law is a weak reed. As Morris himself admits, "it is widely known and fully documented that the United States does not comply with ILO standards regarding the right of workers to engage in collective bargaining." Morris also admits that the International Covenant on Civil and Political Rights does not permit private citizens to sue in U.S. courts, but he explains, however, that the language of the Covenant and the features of its ratification permit raising the issue in NLRB cases. Despite his criticism of Morris' constitutional and international law analyses, this reviewer agreed with Morris' primary analysis based on the wording of the NLRA, stating that "Section 7 protects concerted activities in various contexts by employees where there is no exclusive representative, and the language of section 7 itself does seem to provide for MUB [i.e., minority union bargaining]."

=== Pragmatic issues ===
Several reviewers have pointed out that Morris' prescriptions for reaffirming members-only minority-union collective bargaining contain problems of their own. They applaud Morris for crafting some inventive and aggressive strategies and tactics.

One problem some commentators have noted is that members-only collective bargaining creates problems of competition within the workplace. Employers may not respond favorably when a proposed solution will force them to alter work rules and personnel policies across the entire workforce. As one reviewer argued: "Bargaining over wages for members only or a grievance procedure for members only may be possible. Many subjects will have an effect upon non-members and potentially all other non-represented employees. Such issues may adversely impact non-members who do not want representation." On the other hand, the same problems—if they are problems—could also exist where voluntary recognition and bargaining occurs with a members-only minority union, which is unquestionably legal under the Act. That was conceded by the General Counsel in the Dick's case Advice Memorandum.

== Action by the NLRB ==
The NLRB has not yet considered or acted upon Morris' thesis. In 2006, the United Steelworkers organized a members-only minority union at Dick's Sporting Goods, a sporting-goods retailer located near Pittsburgh, Pennsylvania. The Director of the NLRB's Region 6 asked the NLRB General Counsel's Division of Advice for guidance and received an "Advice Memorandum", on the legal merits of the case. In the Advice Memorandum, Associate General Counsel Barry J. Kearney of the Division of Advice rejected the argument that the NLRA contained an affirmative duty to bargain with members-only minority unions. That Memorandum has been challenged by the two rulemaking petitions now pending before the NLRB.

In his quarterly review of the activities of the Office of the General Counsel, Ronald Meisburg reiterated his conclusion that the NLRA does not require employers to bargain with members-only minority unions.

When Congress enacted Section 9(a), which sets forth the majority rule, it explicitly rejected other forms of representation, including plural and proportional representation, which were permitted under Section 7(a) of the NIRA. Statements by the Act's sponsors show that they did not intend to require employee representation by minority-supported unions because it could not lead to a working system of collective bargaining. ... In the early enforcement of the Act, the Board held that an employer may recognize and bargain with a minority, members-only union, as long as the employer does not extend that union exclusive status. Consolidated Edison Co. of New York, 4 NLRB 71, 110 (1937), enfd. 95 F.2d 390 (2d Cir.), modified on other grounds 305 U.S. 197 (1938). However, nothing in the statutory language, legislative history of the Act, or decisions interpreting the Act, establish an employer's duty to do so. ... Rather, the statutory language, the legislative history, and Board and Supreme Court decisions interpreting the Act all mandate the conclusion that an employer is not required to bargain with a union seeking to bargain as a minority representative for its members.

That assertion was challenged by the rulemaking petition of the Steelworkers Union, et al., now pending before the NLRB, which noted that "not one sentence in either the Advice Memorandum or the Regional Director's Dismissal Letter" in the Dick's case presented any discussion of statutory language other than to reiterate the Morris reading without presenting any disagreement with that reading. It noted further that the Memorandum never addressed the relevant legislative history, particularly the "smoking gun" revelation. Regarding the alleged Board and Supreme Court cases, it pointed out that they are non-existent, for there are no cases holding that minority-bargaining for members only where there is not yet a majority representative is either legal or illegal, and the General Counsel was unable to cite any.

Unions appear determined to bring their case to the NLRB. Because the General Counsel's refusal to issue a complaint is not deemed subject to review, in order to bring the issue before the Board the United Steel, Paper and Forestry, Rubber, Manufacturing, Energy, Allied Industrial and Service Workers International Union, AFL-CIO (Steelworkers Union), joined by six other unions, on August 14, 2007, petitioned the NLRB in a substantive rulemaking case for issuance of the following rule:

Pursuant to Sections 7, 8(a)(1), and 8(a)(5) of the Act, in workplaces where employees are not currently represented by a certified or recognized Section 9(a) majority/exclusive collective-bargaining representative in an appropriate bargaining unit, the employer, upon request, has a duty to bargain collectively with a labor organization that represents less than an employee-majority with regard to the employees who are its members, but not for any other employees.

The six unions that joined with the Steelworkers Union were the International Brotherhood of Electrical Workers, Communication Workers of America, United Automobile, Aerospace and Agricultural Implement Workers of America, International Association of Machinists and Aerospace Workers, California Nurses Association, and United Electrical, Radio and Machine Workers of America. Following the filing of that petition, on August 14, 2007, 25 university professors of labor law submitted a letter to the NLRB indicating their agreement with the legal premise of the Steelworkers' petition and urged the Board to issue the rule proposed in that petition. On January 4, 2008, the Change to Win union federation, on behalf of its seven affiliated unions, to wit, International Brotherhood of Teamsters, Laborers' International Union of North America, Service Employees International Union, United Brotherhood of Carpenters and Joiners of America, United Farm Workers, United Food and Commercial Workers International Union, and UNITE HERE, filed another rulemaking petition requesting the NLRB to issue the above proposed rule. The proposed rule is thus now backed by several major AFL-CIO unions, one independent union, and all of the CTW unions with their six million members. These petitioning unions represent the overwhelming majority of all private sector union members in the United States who are subject to the NLRA.

== Title ==
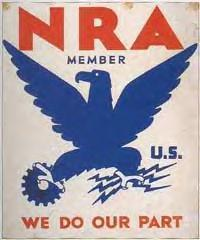
The NRA Blue Eagle

The title of the book refers to the symbol adopted by the National Recovery Administration. The National Industrial Recovery Act was enacted by Congress in 1933 to stimulate the American economy and help the nation recover from the Great Depression. The law created the NRA to administer the act. Section 7(a) of the Act promoted the formation of labor unions, and created a tremendous upsurge of union organizing.

The NRA adopted the "Blue Eagle" icon as its symbol.
