= National Labor Board =

Independent agency of the United States Government

- NLB

Agency overview
- Formed: August 5, 1933
- Dissolved: June 29, 1934
- Superseding agency: "First" National Labor Relations Board
- Headquarters: Washington, D.C.
- Parent agency: Executive Office of the President

The National Labor Board (NLB) was an independent agency of the United States government established on August 5, 1933, to handle labor disputes arising under the National Industrial Recovery Act (NIRA).

== Establishment, structure and procedures ==
The American labor movement, encouraged by the protections guaranteed under Section 7(a) of the National Industrial Recovery Act (NIRA), undertook a wave of organizing not seen in almost two decades. A series of strikes overtook the country in the summer of 1933.

The NIRA established the National Recovery Administration (NRA), and General Hugh S. Johnson was named the agency's administrator.

Gen. Johnson had initially expressed the hope that the NIRA would be self-policing system. But that had clearly not happened, and formal governmental machinery was needed to handle the sudden wave of labor activity.

Subsequently, Johnson—acting on a joint motion from the NRA's Industrial Advisory Board and Labor Advisory Board—created the NLB. President Franklin D. Roosevelt announced the NLB's formation on August 5, 1933. Roosevelt issued no executive order defining the Board's powers, duties or procedures, but he did assert that the board should 'consider, adjust, and settle differences and controversies' arising in labor disputes.

The NLB had seven members. Three members represented labor: American Federation of Labor (AFL) president William Green; United Mine Workers of America president John L. Lewis; and Leo Wolman, formerly director of research for the Amalgamated Clothing Workers of America and chairman of the Labor Advisory Board of the NRA. Three members represented industry: General Electric president Gerard Swope; Louis Kirstein, the vice president of Filene's of Boston (a department store); and Walter C. Teagle, president of Standard Oil of New Jersey. The chairman of the NLB was United States Senator Robert F. Wagner.

Although the NLB's mandate was vague, its procedures undefined and its enforcement powers nonexistent, Sen. Wagner—who had been one of the primary authors of the NIRA—was determined to make the board work along the self-policing lines previously announced by Gen. Johnson.

Initially, the NLB attempted to merely be a mediator in labor disputes. The NIRA protected the right of workers to form unions of their own choosing. And it required employers to engage in good-faith negotiations when a union had issued a demand for recognition and bargaining. More often than not, an employer's refusal to bargain was the issue. Holding representation elections, much less establishing bargaining units or determining majority status, was not even considered by the Board.

Employers, however, quickly established company unions and announced that these were the only proper representatives of the workers. Unions responded by holding strikes, demanding to be recognized as the organization of the workers' choosing and immediate negotiations. Large numbers of workers were summarily fired for striking.

The NLB quickly settled on a strategy of suggesting elections as a way of determining majority status and breaking a collective bargaining deadlock.

== The Reading Formula and representational elections ==
The NLB's opportunity came when the Full-Fashioned Hosiery Workers Union launched an organizing drive in the summer of 1933 in the silk stocking mills around Reading, Pennsylvania. The employers refused to recognize the union, and 10,000 workers went on strike. On August 10, 1933, the NLB mediated a settlement.

Known as the "Reading Formula," the settlement consisted of four parts: (1) That the union call off the strike; (2) That all employees be rehired immediately, without retaliation; (3) That the NLB hold elections in which the workers would vote by secret ballot for their own representatives, and that both parties would negotiate a collective bargaining agreement covering wages, hours and working conditions; and (4) That in the event of any disagreement on any matter, the parties would submit the dispute to the NLB for binding arbitration.

The Reading Formula proved useful in settling large numbers of labor disputes, including strikes in silk mills in Paterson, New Jersey; silk mills in Allentown, Pennsylvania; tool and die factories in Detroit, Michigan; and coal mines in Illinois. In most cases, the union won the election.

But within months, a large number of employers refused to cooperate with the NLB. The NLB relied on enforcement of its orders through the NRA (which only had the power to remove so-called Blue Eagle industrial code approval from a manufacturer) or prosecution by the U.S. Department of Justice. These weak enforcement powers encouraged employer resistance. In July 1933, the Weirton Steel Company held a private election rather than submit to one ran and monitored by the NLB. The Budd Manufacturing Company established a company union, then refused to bargain with the AFL affiliate in the plant.

== E.O. 6580 and representational exclusivity ==
To strengthen the NLB's powers vis-a-vis employers, President Roosevelt issued Executive Order 6511 on December 16, 1933.

The order ratified the Board's prior activities, including its decisions and representational elections. The order also authorized the Board to "settle by mediation, conciliation or arbitration all controversies between employers and employees which tend to impede the purpose of the National Industrial Recovery Act."

But E.O. 6511 said nothing about elections, and did not address the Board's enforcement powers.

Roosevelt issued a new order, E.O. 6580, on February 1, 1934. The order gave the Board explicit power to authorize, upon a showing by a substantial number of employees, representational elections to determine majority status. The order appeared to give the winning organization exclusive representation for employees in the bargaining unit, but this interpretation was widely contested.

Worse, Roosevelt made the off-hand public comment that the government was seeking to check the growth of company unions. This caused a firestorm of discontent among business owners, who began an anti-Wagner campaign.

Johnson was forced to issue a statement denying that the NRA or the administration was seeking to stamp out company unions. His statement also rejected the concept of exclusive representation.

=== Denver Tramway decision ===
The NLB's interpretation of Section 7(a), however, increasing diverged from that espoused by the NRA. On March 1, 1934, the Board issued its decision in Denver Tramway Corporation. The Board held that, where a union had obtained a majority of the votes cast in a government-sponsored representational election, any collective bargaining agreement would have to cover all employees in the bargaining unit.

Until Denver Tramway, unions had bargained only for their own members. A union which represented only half the bus drivers in a company, for example, would bargain a contract only on behalf of its members. Another union could represent the other bus drivers. In many cases, several unions represented the same workers in one company, each union bargaining a different contract for however many members it represented.

Denver Tramway was a major turning point in American labor law because it established the rule of exclusive representation. This rule said that a union which won the majority of votes in an election would win the right to represent all workers. Even when several unions competed against one another and no union won a majority of the votes, the union with the most votes still won the right to represent all workers.

=== Temporary abandonment of exclusive representation ===
President Roosevelt quickly disavowed the Board's exclusive representation rule. The United Auto Workers had organized more than 50,000 workers in the automobile industry in 1933. But the auto companies rejected the union's demand for recognition, set up company unions and refused to allow the NLB to mediate. Roosevelt intervened personally in the dispute. On March 25, 1934, Roosevelt announced a settlement that provided for proportional, rather than exclusive, representation—thus giving the company unions equal footing with the Auto Workers. The agreement also stripped the NLB of its jurisdiction over the auto industry. Worse, the agreement provided no authority for holding elections, and thus no means of determining which organizations truly represented workers.

== Demise of the NLB ==
Senator Wagner, convinced by the fall of 1933 that the NLB needed replacement, began work on legislation which would establish a new statutory regime for labor relations in the United States.

Consulting with a key aide, Leon Keyserling, Wagner conceived of a "labor court" to hear cases involving labor disputes and fashion enforceable resolutions. Roosevelt evinced no interest in such a bill, so Wagner proceeded without him. Labor leaders were consulted in January 1934, and a bill was drafted in February.

The "Labor Disputes Act" was introduced in the Senate on March 1, 1934. The bill provided statutory authority for the existence of the NLB, and gave it exclusive enforcement authority over Section 7(a) of the NIRA. The NLB was given the authority to hold elections, but it was also authorized to prohibit acts of coercion by the employer against employees and required employers to bargain in good faith with the duly elected representatives of workers.

The bill explicitly incorporated the concept of exclusive representation. However, it did not require it, and left it up to the NLB to determine whether to apply the rule, given the facts of each case.

Wagner's bill received a hostile reception in Congress. The business community fought the bill ferociously, arguing that it contravened Roosevelt's own policies in the automobile case. The press, too, was adamantly opposed to the legislation. Administration spokespersons were ambivalent about the bill, when they mentioned it at all.

Nevertheless, Roosevelt and the Democratic leadership in Congress understood the need for action. A wave of large strikes swept the country in April and May, and a significant number of them were over the recognition issue. Senator David I. Walsh, Democrat from Massachusetts and chair of the Senate Committee on Education and Labor, quickly wrote a substitute bill, the "National Industrial Adjustment Bill".

The Walsh bill significantly altered many of the provisions of Wagner's bill. It permitted company unions, removed prohibitions on a refusal to bargain, and turned the Board's affirmative duty to determine the outlines of the bargaining unit into a voluntary one.

The Walsh bill won almost unanimous support from the president, the cabinet, the Senate and even from Wagner himself. Wagner was unhappy with the number of provisions which had been watered down, but believed that passage of some legislation was preferable to inaction. He also resolved to draft much stronger legislation after the fall elections. Nevertheless, the Walsh bill faced an uncertain future in the Senate. Congress needed to adjourn and return home to campaign for the fall elections, and the bill promised a lengthy fight.

Roosevelt once more directly intervened in order to win labor peace. Steelworker unions were threatening a nationwide strike. At a White House conference on June 12, 1934, Roosevelt called together Wagner, Walsh, U.S. Department of Labor secretary Frances Perkins, Senate majority leader Joseph T. Robinson, Representative Joseph W. Byrns and several aides. After discussion, Roosevelt himself dictated Public Resolution No. 44. The resolution authorized the president to create one or more new labor boards to enforce Section 7(a) by conducting investigations, subpoenaing evidence and witnesses, holding elections and issuing orders.

Public Resolution No. 44 was introduced in the Senate the next day. Amended to expressly protect the right to strike, it passed both houses of Congress on unanimous voice-votes. Roosevelt signed the resolution on June 19, 1934.

Roosevelt issued Executive Order 6763 on June 29, 1934. The new order abolished the NLB. In its place, it established the National Labor Relations Board. The new NLRB had only three members: Lloyd K. Garrison, dean of the University of Wisconsin Law School, was its chairman; Harry A. Millis, professor of economics at the University of Chicago, and Edwin S. Smith, Commissioner of Labor and Industry for the state of Massachusetts, were its members.

The new law encouraged the proliferation of labor boards to cover various segments of industry. Roosevelt duly complied with business demands for these boards. Each board interpreted the law as it wished, and American labor law fragmented.

Wagner, however, proceeded to draft and in 1935 introduced a new bill, the National Labor Relations Act (NLRA). The NLRA was enacted and is the basis for private-sector labor relations in the United States to this day.

== Impact of the NLB ==
Many of the legal doctrines established by the National Labor Board deeply influenced American labor relations. The Board's exclusive representation doctrine was "a major landmark in American labor history". The doctrine was later enacted into law as part of the NLRA, and the NLRB continues to apply it today.

The Board's decision in Denver Tramway laid the basis as well for the NLRB's concept of mature collective bargaining relations. Under this doctrine, the NLRB has emphasized and de-emphasized various aspects of the NLRA over time, weighing different parts of the law more heavily depending on the longevity of the collective bargaining relationship between the employer and union.

Other Board decisions, such as Bee Bus Line Company (decided May 10, 1934) and Eagle Rubber Company (decided May 17, 1934), laid down the stipulation that a properly conducted, government-monitored representational election required good-faith bargaining, and that collective bargaining must precede the decision to strike. Both decisions have had stabilizing influences on collective bargaining relationships.

The doctrines laid down by the NLB continue to reverberate in 2006, as the NLRB wrestles with the implications of card check and voluntary recognition.
