= Berkeley Journal of Employment & Labor Law =

- Discipline: United States labor law
- Language: English

Publication details
- Former name: Industrial Relations Law Journal
- History: 1975–present
- Publisher: University of California, Berkeley School of Law (United States)
- Frequency: Semiannual

Standard abbreviations
- Bluebook: Berkeley J. Emp. & Lab. L.
- ISO 4: Berkeley J. Employ. Labor Law

Indexing
- ISSN: 1067-7666

Links
- Journal homepage

The Berkeley Journal of Employment & Labor Law (BJELL) is a law journal that publishes articles focusing on current developments in labor and employment law. It was founded in 1975 as the Industrial Relations Law Journal. It changed its name to the current title in 1993. Articles in the journal cover legal issues dealing with employment discrimination, "traditional" labor law, public sector employment, international and comparative labor law, employee benefits, and the evolution of the doctrine of wrongful termination. In addition to scholarly articles, the journal includes student-authored comments, book reviews and essays. It is published twice a year by Berkeley Law.

BJELL is the most cited employment law journal in the world.

In order "to bring attention to the study and practice of American labor law and to spur the academic exchange of ideas about its contemporary significance," BJELL holds the annual David E. Feller Memorial Labor Law Lecture.
