= Bradford (surname) =

Bradford is a surname of Old English origin. It particularly refers to those from the City of Bradford, West Yorkshire formerly in the West Riding of Yorkshire.

- Anthony Bradford (born 2001), American football player
- Arthur Bradford (born 1969), American writer and director
- Barbara Taylor Bradford (1933–2024), British novelist
- Bill Bradford (footballer) (1903–1984), English footballer
- Bill Bradford (pitcher) (1921–2000), American baseball player
- Brad Bradford (born 1986), Canadian politician
- Buddy Bradford (born 1944), American baseball player
- Carl Bradford (born 1992), American football player
- Carmen Bradford (born 1960), American jazz singer
- Chad Bradford (born 1974), baseball player, pitcher
- Charlotte Bradford (1813 – 1893) nurse in the American Civil War
- Chris Bradford (born 1974), writer, best known for Young Samurai series
- Cody Bradford (born 1998), American baseball player
- Cornelia Bradford (disambiguation), multiple people
- Crystal Bradford (born 1993), American basketball player
- David Bradford (disambiguation), multiple people
- Dorothy Bradford (artist) (1918–2008), British painter
- Dorothy Elizabeth Bradford (1897–1986), British painter
- Edward Bradford (disambiguation), multiple people
- Edwin Emmanuel Bradford (1860–1944), priest, theologian, poet, and novelist
- Emantic Fitzgerald Bradford Jr. (1997–2018), victim of a police shooting in Hoover, Alabama
- Ernle Bradford (1922–1986), English historian and writer
- Francis Scott Bradford (1898–1961), American muralist
- Frank Bradford (1941–2022), American lawyer and politician
- Gamaliel Bradford (disambiguation), multiple people
- Geoff Bradford (1927–1994), English footballer
- Geoff Bradford (musician) (1934–2014) English blues musician
- George W. Bradford (1796–1883), New York politician
- Glenn Bradford (born 1947), Illinois politician and lawyer
- James Bradford (disambiguation), multiple people
- Jesse Bradford (born 1979), American actor
- Joe Bradford (1901–1980), English footballer
- Joshua Taylor Bradford (1818–1871), American surgeon
- Leslie Bradford (1878–1943), Australian chemist, metallurgist and entrepreneur
- Lillie Mae Bradford (1928–2017), American civil rights activist
- Lynn Bradford, American football player
- Marion M. Bradford (1946–2021), American biochemist
- Mark Bradford (born 1961), American visual artist
- Mel Bradford (1934–1993), American literature professor
- Michael Bradford (1965–), American playwright and artistic director
- Peter A. Bradford, American professor
- Richard Bradford (1934–2016), American actor
- Robert Bradford (1941–1981), Northern Irish footballer, Methodist minister and politician
- Roland Boys Bradford (1892–1917), British general
- Sam Bradford (born 1987), American football quarterback
- Samuel C. Bradford (1878–1948) British librarian and documentalist
- Sidney Bradford (1906–1960), recipient of a successful cornea transplant
- Steven Bradford (1963-), Australian Clinical Psychologist
- Vic Bradford (1915–1994), American baseball player and coach
- William Bradford (disambiguation), multiple people
- Wilmot Henry Bradford (1815–1914), British Army officer

== See also ==
- Bradford (disambiguation)
- Bradford (name)
