= Dorothy Bradford =

Dorothy Bradford may refer to

- Dorothy Bradford (artist) (1918–2008), British painter
- Dorothy Elizabeth Bradford (1897–1986), British painter
- Dorothy Bradford (c.1597–1620), wife of William Bradford (Plymouth Colony governor)

== See also ==
- Bradford
- Bradford (name)
