= Bradford (disambiguation) =

Bradford is a city in West Yorkshire, England.

Bradford may also refer to:

== Places ==
=== In Canada ===
- Bradford, Ontario

=== In New Zealand ===
- Bradford, New Zealand, a suburb of Dunedin

=== In Sierra Leone ===
- Bradford, Sierra Leone

=== In the United Kingdom ===
- City of Bradford, a metropolitan district of West Yorkshire, England
- Bradford (constituency), a former constituency in West Yorkshire, England
- Bradford, Cornwall, England
- Bradford, Derbyshire, a location in England
- Bradford, Devon, England
- Bradford, Manchester, a district and electoral ward in the city of Manchester, England, two miles north east of the city centre
  - Bradford (Manchester ward)
- Bradford, Adderstone with Lucker, Northumberland, England, near Wooler
- Bradford, Belsay, in Belsay, Northumberland, England, near Morpeth
- Bradford, West Yorkshire, the namesake city, 1 of 7 post towns, and the largest of the many towns and villages which make up the City of Bradford
- Bradford Abbas, a village in Dorset
- Bradford-on-Avon, a town in Wiltshire
- Bradford-on-Tone, Somerset
- Bradford Peverell, a village in Dorset
- West Bradford, Lancashire

=== In the United States ===
- Bradford, Alabama, an unincorporated community
- Bradford, Arkansas
- Bradford, Illinois
- Bradford, Indiana
- Bradford, Iowa (disambiguation), multiple places
- Bradford, Kansas
- Bradford, Kentucky
- Bradford, Maine
- Bradford, Massachusetts (now part of Haverhill)
- Bradford, New Hampshire, a New England town
  - Bradford (CDP), New Hampshire, the main village in the town
- Bradford, New York
- Bradford, Ohio
- Bradford, Pennsylvania
- Bradford, Rhode Island
- Bradford, Tennessee
- Bradford, Texas
- Bradford, Vermont
- Bradford, Wisconsin
- Bradford County, Florida
- Bradford County, Pennsylvania
- Bradford Township, Minnesota (disambiguation)
- Bradford Township, Pennsylvania (disambiguation)
- Bradford Plaza, a shopping center in West Chester, Pennsylvania
- Bradford Island, California

== People and fictional characters ==
- Bradford (name), a list of people and fictional characters with the given name or surname
- Earl of Bradford, two titles, one in the Peerage of England and one in the Peerage of the United Kingdom

== Education ==
- University of Bradford, a university in Bradford, West Yorkshire, England
- Bradford College, a college in Bradford, West Yorkshire, England
- Bradford College (United States), a now-defunct college in Haverhill, Massachusetts, USA

== Sports teams ==
- Bradford Bulls, formerly Bradford Northern, rugby league team from Bradford, West Yorkshire, England
- Bradford City A.F.C., Football League team from Bradford, West Yorkshire, England
- Bradford (Park Avenue) A.F.C., former Football League and non-league team from Bradford, West Yorkshire, England
- Bradford Town F.C., non-league football team from Bradford-on-Avon, Wiltshire, England

== Transportation ==
- Bradford Forster Square railway station, railway station in Bradford, West Yorkshire, England
- Bradford GO Station, in Bradford, Ontario, Canada
- Bradford Interchange, bus and railway station in Bradford, West Yorkshire, England
- Bradford station, MBTA station in Bradford, Massachusetts, United States

== Other uses ==
- Bradford (band), a late eighties indie band from Blackburn, Lancashire, England
- Bradford (computer program), that helped to launch the shareware movement
- Bradford Books, a publishing imprint of MIT Press
- Another name for a martini, that has been shaken rather than stirred
- Bradford pear, a cultivar of Callery pear popular as an urban ornamental tree
- English ship Bradford

== See also ==
- Bradford Airport (disambiguation)
- Bradford & Bingley plc, a British bank
- Bradford White, an American manufacturer of water heaters
- Bradford system, method of assessing quality of wool
- Bradford's law (bibliometrics), a pattern that estimates the exponentially diminishing returns of extending a search for references in science journals
- Bradford protein assay, a spectroscopic procedure to measure the concentration of protein in solution
- Bredevoort, a Dutch town with the same meaning as Bradford
