= Gamaliel Bradford =

Gamaliel Bradford may refer to:

- Gamaliel Bradford (privateersman) (1768–1824), American privateersman
- Gamaliel Bradford (abolitionist) (1795–1839), American physician and early abolitionist from Boston
- Gamaliel Bradford (banker) (1831–1911), American banker from Boston who helped organize the American Anti-Imperialist League
- Gamaliel Bradford (biographer) (1863–1932), American biographer, critic, poet, and dramatist
