= Sarah Bradford Ripley =

American educator and scholar (1793–1867)

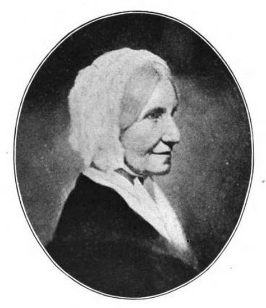
- Born: Sarah Alden Bradford; July 31, 1793; Boston, Massachusetts
- Died: July 26, 1867 (aged 73); Concord, Massachusetts
- Resting place: Sleepy Hollow Cemetery (Concord, Massachusetts)
- Spouse: Samuel Ripley
- Children: 7
- Relatives: Gamaliel Bradford, father Gamaliel Bradford, brother Gamaliel Bradford, grand-nephew

Sarah Alden Bradford Ripley (July 31, 1793 – July 26, 1867) was an American educator and scholar at a time when women were rarely admitted to universities. She acquired most of her knowledge of the classics, philosophy, modern languages, botany, astronomy, and chemistry through independent study. She was reputedly "one of the most learned women of the nineteenth century."

== Early life and education ==
Sarah Alden Bradford was born in Boston on July 31, 1793, the oldest of nine children of Gamaliel Bradford III and Elizabeth Hickling Bradford. Her mother had tuberculosis and her father was a sea captain who was often away on voyages, leaving Sarah to care for her younger siblings.

The family lived in Boston but often spent time in Duxbury, Massachusetts, where her paternal grandfather lived. There she met Abba B. Allyn, who became a lifelong friend. Allyn's father, Dr. John Allyn, tutored both girls in Latin and Greek. Bradford also attended classes taught by Jacob Abbot Cummings in Boston, and read the books her father brought home from his travels. While in her teens she taught herself to read French and Italian, and studied chemistry, physics, and botany on her own initiative.

According to one biographer, it took Bradford two weeks to work up the courage to ask her father for permission to study Latin. When she finally did, her father laughed and said, "A girl study Latin! Yes, study Latin if you want to. You may study anything you please."

In 1813 the family moved to Charlestown, Massachusetts, where Bradford's father became the warden of the Charlestown State Prison. There she tutored her younger siblings in a makeshift schoolroom above the kitchen. She acquired a college education by proxy when her brothers attended Harvard College and she read their books. She also read German biblical criticism and had many discussions of theology with her aunt and mentor, Mary Moody Emerson.

One of her younger brothers, Gamaliel Bradford (1795-1839), went on to become a physician and a noted abolitionist.

== The Ripley School ==
Her mother died in 1817, and soon afterwards she received a proposal of marriage from Samuel Ripley (1783–1847), a Harvard-educated Unitarian minister. Although she did not relish the thought of living in the country as a parson's wife, she accepted on the advice of her father. The couple were married on October 13, 1818, and moved into the parsonage in Waltham, Massachusetts, where Samuel Ripley was minister of the First Church. There they ran a small boarding school that accommodated about 14 boys, as well as four of Sarah's younger siblings. Sarah (now Sarah Ripley) was the "sole matron" of the school.

Sarah and Samuel Ripley had nine children, two of whom died in infancy. In addition to raising the children, Sarah Ripley taught at the school with the occasional help of tutors, including the young Ralph Waldo Emerson. The school gained an excellent reputation largely due to Sarah Ripley's scholarship and skill as a teacher. Harvard President Edward Everett said that she could have filled in for any professor at Harvard. Harvard would sometimes send students to her who had been "rusticated" (suspended); according to one of her former students, George Frisbie Hoar, they would come away "better instructed than they would have been if they had stayed in Cambridge."

In her thirties, she struggled to reconcile her faith with her knowledge of science. She often discussed spiritual matters with Frederic Henry Hedge, Margaret Fuller, Elizabeth Peabody, George Ripley, Convers Francis, and Theodore Parker, as well as her friend and relative Ralph Waldo Emerson.

== Later years ==
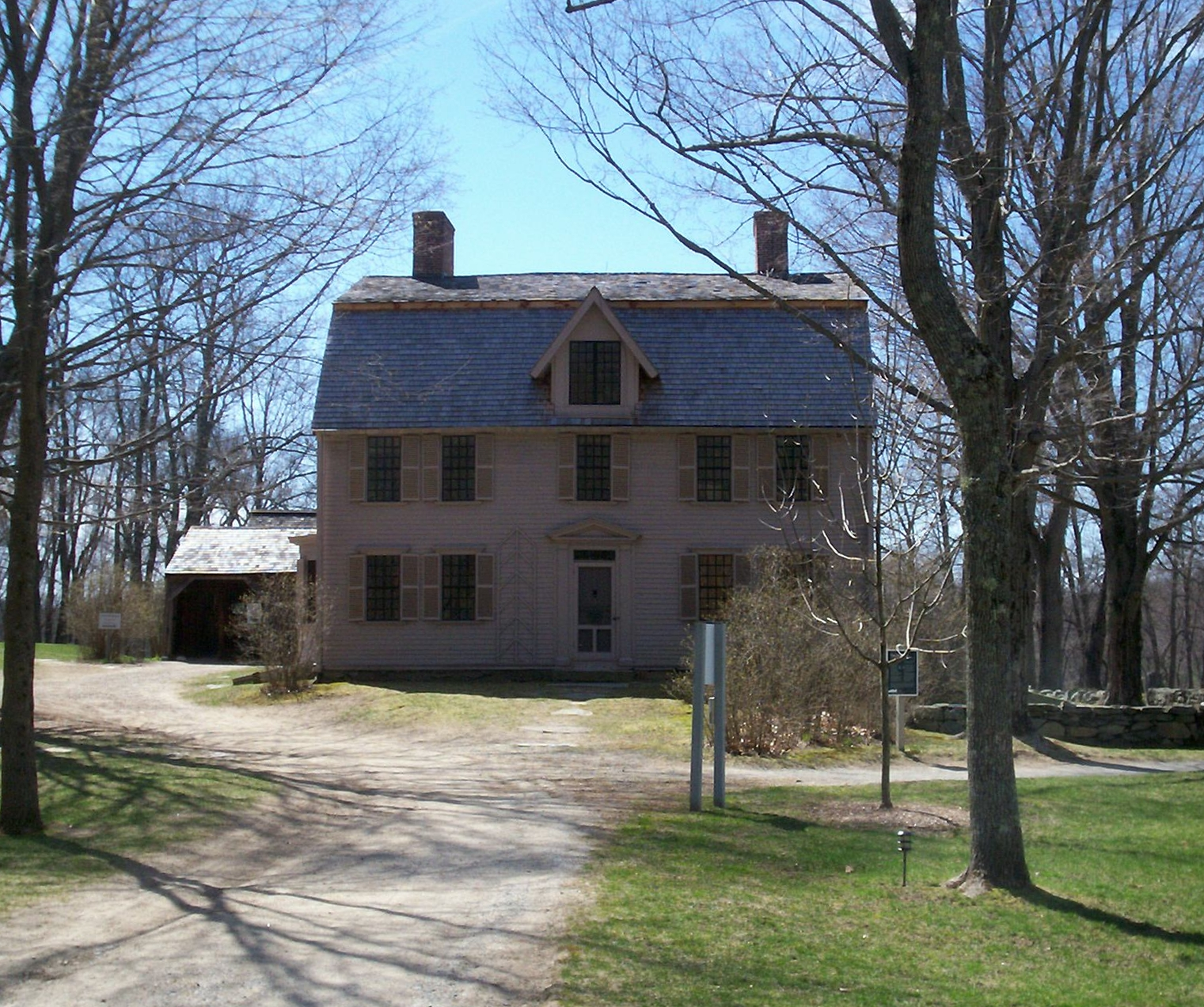
The Old Manse, Concord

In the spring of 1846, the Ripleys retired to Concord, Massachusetts, where Samuel Ripley had inherited a house from his father, Ezra Ripley. Its prior occupant, Nathaniel Hawthorne, published Mosses from an Old Manse that same year, and the house became known as "The Old Manse". Sarah Ripley continued tutoring students occasionally, including her grandchildren, and her husband continued preaching. Family friends in Concord included Franklin Benjamin Sanborn, Ellery Channing, and Asa Gray.

Samuel Ripley died of a heart attack in 1847, leaving Sarah Ripley to care for seven children, a grandchild, and a son-in-law. During the Civil War, one of her sons joined the Union army and was killed near Vicksburg in 1863. She died on July 26, 1867, at the home of her daughter, Mary Ripley Simmons. She was buried with her husband at the Emerson family plot in the Sleepy Hollow Cemetery in Concord.

== Tributes ==
Ripley's contemporaries typically followed their praise for her intellect with some praise for her housekeeping and parenting skills. In 1876, her biography was included in a book published by the directors of the Centennial Exposition, along with those of five others who were considered "the best examples of American womanhood." In it, she is introduced as "one who combined rare and living knowledge of literature and science with the household skill and habits of personal labor needful to New England women of limited means."

Ralph Waldo Emerson called her "one of the best Greek scholars in the country," then hastened to add that "her mind was purely receptive. She had no ambition to propound a theory, or to write her own name on any book, or plant, or opinion. Her delight in books was not tainted by any wish to shine..." Emerson took care to reassure readers that her housework never suffered as a result of her studies:

But this wide and successful study was, during all the hours of middle life, only the work of hours stolen from sleep, or was combined with some household task which occupied the hands and left the eyes free. She was faithful to all the duties of wife and mother in a well-ordered and eminently hospitable household.

George Frisbie Hoar called her "one of the most wonderful scholars of her time, or indeed of any time," and in the same paragraph described her as "simple as a child, an admirable wife and mother, performing perfectly all the commonest duties of the household."

Her friend Frederic Henry Hedge, observing in his eulogy that Ripley had never published a single piece of writing, praised her modesty and called her "a perfect woman."
