= John Bradford (disambiguation) =

John Bradford (1510–1555) was an English reformer and martyr.

John Bradford may also refer to:

== Politicians ==
- John Bradford (Australian politician) (born 1946), Australian former politician
- John Bradford (MP) (fl. 1377–1391), MP for Leominster
- John C. Bradford (born 1940), American politician in the Massachusetts House of Representatives
- John Bradford (Kansas politician) (born 1951), member of the Kansas House of Representatives
- John R. Bradford (born 1974), member of the North Carolina General Assembly

== Sportsmen ==
- Jack Bradford (footballer) (1895–1969), English footballer
- Jock Bradford (1887–1973), Scottish footballer (Morton, St Mirren)
- John Bradford (footballer) (born 1979), Scottish footballer (Ayr United)
- John Bradford (soccer) (born 1980), American soccer coach

== Others ==
- John Bradford (dissenting minister) (1750–1805), English non-conformist minister
- John Bradford (poet) (1706–1785), Welsh poet
- John Bradford (printer) (1749–1840), early American settler
- Sir John Bradford, 1st Baronet (1863–1935), British physician
- Jack Bradford (born 1959), Australian actor and director
- John Spencer Purvis Bradford (1918–1975), British archaeologist

== See also ==
- John Bradford Fisher (born 1953), American plastic surgeon, pioneer in fat removal
