= Cécile Staub Genhart =

Swiss American pianist and teacher

Cécile Staub Genhart

Cécile Staub Genhart (1898–1983) was a Swiss American pianist, pedagogue and teacher. Born in Basel, she played with the Berlin Philharmonic Orchestra in 1922. She moved to the United States and joined the faculty of Eastman School of Music in 1926. She spent over 40 years teaching at Eastman.

== Early life in Europe ==
Cécile Staub was born in December 1898 in Basel, Switzerland. She was the youngest of three daughters of Fannie (née Häusler) and Gottfried Staub, a piano professor at Basel Conservatory. Her family moved to Zürich when she was 15 years old. At the Zürich Conservatory, she studied with Volkmar Andreae. She was later educated at the Munich Royal Academy.

She studied independently with the Swiss composer Emil Frey in Zürich, and also studied with Eugen d'Albert, Edwin Fischer, and Tobias Matthay. While some sources state that she studied with Italian composer Ferruccio Busoni, she only visited him occasionally to discuss composition and music.

Genhart's solo debut was with the Berlin Philharmonic Orchestra in 1922. She also made concert debuts in Munich and in Zürich with the Tonhalle-Orchester Zürich. She met Hermann Genhart, one of her father's students in Zürich. The two married and moved to the United States.

== Career in the United States ==
Genhart's husband joined the Eastman School of Music faculty in 1924. She received a full-time appointment as a member of the school's piano faculty in 1926. She gave a recital on February 5, 1927, at Steinway Hall that was written up in the New York Times, which called it "a program of uncommon taste and a performance of unexpected vigor". She was also responsible for the introduction of Johannes Brahms' Piano Concerto No. 2 to Rochester, New York. A Journal of the American Liszt Society review named her as one of the finest pianists in the United States.

Genhart taught for over 40 years at Eastman. She headed the faculty for piano at the school from 1954 until her retirement in 1971. Among her students were Robert Silverman, Ernesto Lejano, Anne Koscielny, Aiko Onishi, Barry Snyder, Josef Verba, Bradford Gowen, Joseph Fennimore, John Perry, Janice Weber, and Stewart L. Gordon. Gordon wrote his doctoral dissertation, "Cecile Staub Genhart; her biography and her concepts of piano playing" in 1965. In 1974, she donated approximately $50,000 to establish a piano scholarship fund at the Eastman School of Music.

Genhart died in 1983. A portrait of her hangs in the Cominsky Promenade of the Eastman School of Music.
