= Richard Goodchild =

British archaeologist

Richard George Goodchild (born 18 July 1918 in Exeter, died 18 February 1968 in London) was a British provincial Roman archaeologist. He was one of the pioneers of archaeology in Libya.

== Education and career ==
Goodchild's interest in archaeology began as a schoolboy at Cranleigh School, a private boarding school in Surrey. From 1936, he attended the University of Oxford to study history. There he joined the University of Oxford Archaeological Society which undertook excavations in the area around Oxford. During one of these excavations, Goodchild met, among others, the archaeologist Olwen Brogan and the later pioneer of aerial archaeology, John Spencer Purvis Bradford. While still a student, Goodchild and Bradford excavated the Gallo-Roman temple of Frilford in Oxfordshire.

In 1939 Goodchild and A.W.G. Lowther excavated the Romano-Celtic Temple on Farley Heath in Surrey.

The Second World War broke out immediately after he graduated from Oxford. Goodchild received an officer scholarship to join the Royal Artillery. He served as a captain in the Middle East and Italy. He took every opportunity to visit the ancient places of the countries in which he served.

From 1946 to 1948 Goodchild worked for the British military administration as head of the antique collection in the Italian province of Tripolitania. There he met Olwen Brogan again and began his longstanding collaboration with the archaeologist John Bryan Ward-Perkins (1912-1981), who had been the director of the British School in Rome since 1945. In 1947 Goodchild was elected as a Fellow of the Society of Antiquaries of London. From 1948 to 1953 he worked as a librarian at the British School at Rome. He spent his holidays in Tripolitania to help preserve the ancient cultural heritage on a tight budget. He carried out surveying work on the ancient sites and conducted excavations in the hinterland. He led several expeditions to southern Tripolitania, working with Joyce Reynolds. In order to create a map of Roman Libya, he expanded his research area to Cyrenaica and Syrtica. The resulting two sheets for the research project Tabula Imperii Romani were published by the Society of Antiquaries of London after their completion.

In 1953 he was appointed head of the antique service for the province of Cyrenaica by the royal Libyan government. He held this position until 1966. In 1967 he was appointed professor of archaeology for the Roman provinces at the University of London.

== Publications ==
- Libyan Studies. Select Papers of the Late RG Goodchild. Elek, London 1976, ISBN 0-236-17680-3
- Cyrene and Apollonia (= ruined cities of North Africa. Volume 4). Raggi, Zurich 1971.
- Fortificazioni e palazzi bizantini in Tripolitania e Cirenaica. In: Corso di Cultura sull'Arte Ravennate e Bizantina. Volume 13, 1966, pp. 225–250.
- Tabula Imperii Romani: Map of the Roman Empire based on the International 1: 1,000,000 Map of the World, Sheet HI 33. Lepcis Magna. Society of Antiquaries of London, Oxford 1954.
- Tabula Imperii Romani. Map of the Roman Empire based on the International 1: 1,000,000 Map of the World, sheet HI34: Cyrene. Society of Antiquaries of London, Oxford 1954.
- with John Bryan Ward Perkins: The Christian Antiquities of Tripolitania. In: Archaeologia or Miscellaneous Tracts Relating to Antiquity. Volume 95, 1953, pp. 1–84.
- with John Bryan Ward Perkins: The Roman and Byzantine Defenses of Lepcis Magna. In: Papers of the British School at Rome. Volume 21, 1953, pp. 42–73.
- The Roman Roads and Milestones of Tripolitania. Discoveries and Researches in 1947. Department of Antiquities, British Military Administration, Tripolitania 1948.
