= Camino Real (play) =

1953 play by Tennessee Williams

- First edition (New Directions)
- Original language: English
- Written by: Tennessee Williams
- Characters: Kilroy; Gutman; Casanova; Marguerite Gautier; The Gypsy; Esmeralda (the Gypsy's daughter); Don Quixote; Lord Byron; Baron de Charlus; Lady Mulligan; Lord Mulligan
- Genre: Drama
- Setting: The end of Camíno Re-ál and the beginning of Camino Real

Premiere
- Date: March 17, 1953
- Place: National Theatre; New York City, USA

Camino Real is a 1953 play by Tennessee Williams.

== Pronunciation of the title ==
The title is Spanish, referring to a highway. In Spanish the penultimate syllable of "camino" is stressed, but in the introduction to the Penguin edition of the play, Williams directs the reader to use the Anglicized pronunciation "Cá-mino Réal". Despite the implication that the setting is connected by a road to the wider world, it turns out to be a dead-end place, a town surrounded by desert and with only sporadic transportation . It is described by Williams as "nothing more nor less than my conception of the time and the world I live in."

== Synopsis ==
=== Characters ===
Kilroy, a young American visitor, fulfills some of the functions of the play's narrator, as does Gutman, (named after Sydney Greenstreet's character from The Maltese Falcon, but bearing more resemblance to Signor Ferrari, Greenstreet's character in Casablanca) manager of the hotel Siete Mares, whose terrace occupies part of the stage. Williams also employs a large cast of characters including many famous literary characters who appear in dream sequences. They include Don Quixote and his partner Sancho, Marguerite "Camille" Gautier (see The Lady of the Camellias), Casanova, Lord Byron, and Esmeralda (see The Hunchback of Notre-Dame), and others.

=== Setting and theme ===
The play has one location — the plaza at the end of the road — Camino Real. On one side of the plaza is the dining area of the Siete Mares hotel, on the other side is Skid Row. The town is near the sea, and is tropical, mythic, and sometimes dream-like. It isn’t named, though it suggests Mexico or Louisiana. According to the author, the play exists "outside of time in a place of no specific locality". It is a place of refuge for the quirky misfits that turn up there, and find their illusions crumble. Characters include Lord Byron, Gypsy and her sex-driven daughter, Esmerelda, La Madrecita, a blind singer, and Casanova at an advanced age.

Taking place in the main plaza, the play goes through a series of confusing and almost logic-defying events, including the revival of the Gypsy's daughter (Esmeralda)'s virginity and then the loss of it again. A main theme that the play deals with is coming to terms with the thought of growing older and possibly becoming irrelevant.

=== Plot ===
The division of the play includes a prologue followed by 16 scenes or “blocks” and monologues.

Sancho Panza has left Don Quixote, who then falls asleep, and Quixote's dream, which ensues, becomes the play. Quixote needs someone to replace Panza, so he selects Kilroy, a dispirited American soldier, who had appeared on the plaza. Kilroy has been courageous in his boxing career, but now he feels lost, and needs to sell his golden gloves.

The cruel Gutman, builds The Seven Seas Hotel above the town's water source. Other characters appear in dreams, including Camille, Lord Byron, Esmeralda, La Madrecita (a blind singer), and Baron de Charlus, the sexual seeker who is murdered. Some characters find partners and some do not.

Resurrections occur: Esmeralda regains her virginity, the singer’s eyesight is restored, Kilroy and Lord Byron are transformed.

Marguerite tells Casanova that she has outlived the tenderness of her heart, and that "tenderness, the violets in the mountains—can't break the rocks!" Casanova falls in love and has the last line of the play: "The violets in the mountains have broken the rocks."

== Production history ==
=== Inspiration ===
In 1946 Williams wrote an account of the origins of the play, in which he describes how he was visiting Mexico in 1945 and in a romantic, dreamy mood, when:

I catch a glimpse of a childishly drawn inscription, one that I have seen in a thousand different public places in the States but never before in Mexico. KILROY WAS HERE, it announces...He comes into the Sonata like hot licks on a trumpet, he and the world that he lives in, a world of pawnshops on Rampart Street, jitney dancehalls, dollar-a-night hotel rooms, bars on Skid Row, all the vivid, one-dimensional clowneries and heroisms of the nickel comic and adventure strips, celebrated in the raw colors of childhood’s spectrum. This is Kilroy, the most famous citizen of America, about whom nothing is known except that he goes everywhere that it doesn’t cost much to go, the poor man’s Don Quixote or Paul Bunyan.

=== Premiere ===
Camino Real originated with Williams's one-act play, Ten Blocks on the Camino Real, written in 1946 and published by Dramatists Play Service in 1948. This series of 10 scenes, or "blocks", was first staged in a workshop by Elia Kazan at the Actors Studio in 1949. By 1952 Williams had expanded the play into a 16-scene version, and he finalized the text the following year for its publication by New Directions Publishing. For the 1953 Broadway production, directed by Kazan with assistance by Anna Sokolow, the cast included Eli Wallach (as Kilroy), Frank Silvera (as Gutman), Joseph Anthony (as Casanova), Jo Van Fleet (as Marguerite "Camille" Gautier), Jennie Goldstein (as the Gypsy), Barbara Baxley (as Esmeralda), and David J. Stewart (as the Baron).

With only 60 performances on Broadway, the play was not a mainstream success. Brooks Atkinson of The New York Times called it "a strange and disturbing drama," which seemed to be "a dark mirror" of "Mr. Williams's concept of life — full of black and appalling images." Director Elia Kazan later wrote in his memoirs that he had misinterpreted the play by infusing it with excessive naturalism.

=== London premiere ===
The first London production opened on April 8, 1957, at the Phoenix Theatre. It starred Denholm Elliott as Kilroy, Diana Wynyard as Marguerite, was directed by Peter Hall and played for two months.

=== Revivals ===
Camino Real was presented on television in 1966 by NET, a PBS predecessor, as Ten Blocks on the Camino Real. A black-and-white production, it was directed by Jack Landau and starred Martin Sheen, Lotte Lenya, Tom Aldredge, Michael Baseleon, Albert Dekker, and Hurd Hatfield.

In 1968, the Los Angeles Mark Taper Forum revived the play with Earl Holliman as Kilroy.

In January 1970, the play enjoyed its first Broadway revival at the Vivian Beaumont Theater at Lincoln Center, directed by Jules Irving and starring Al Pacino (Kilroy), Victor Buono (Gutman), Patrick McVey (Don Quixote), Jean-Pierre Aumont (Casanova), Jessica Tandy (Camille), Sylvia Syms (the Gypsy), David J. Stewart (the Baron), Susan Tyrrell (Esmeralda), and Clifford David (Lord Byron). In his review for The New York Times, critic Clive Barnes wrote "there are people who think that Camino Real was Tennessee Williams's best play, and I believe that they are right. It is a play that seems to have been torn out of a human soul, a tale told by an idiot signifying a great deal of suffering and a great deal of gallantry."

The UK's Royal Shakespeare Company revived the play at the Swan Theatre in 1996. The production was directed by Steven Pimlott, and starred Leslie Phillips as Gutman, Peter Egan as Casanova and Susannah York as Camille.

In June 1999, Nicholas Martin staged a production at the Williamstown Theater Festival, featuring Ethan Hawke (Kilroy), Jeffrey Jones (Gutman), Richard Easton (Casanova), Blair Brown (Marguerite Gautier), Christian Camargo (Baron de Charlus and Lord Byron), Hope Davis (Esmeralda), Kristine Nielsen (The Gypsy), and John Seidman (Lord Mulligan and Don Quixote). Reviewing the production in the New York Times, Ben Brantley wrote that "... in his art as in his life, Williams could be grotesquely excessive and sloppy. But whatever he wrote, he tore it straight from his soul, and in this age of irony there is something especially nourishing in such sustained depths of emotion."

In October 1999, Michael Wilson mounted another revival at the Hartford Stage, with a cast including James Colby (Kilroy), Helmar Augustus Cooper (Gutman), Rip Torn (Casanova), Betty Buckley (Marguerite Gautier), Novella Nelson (Gypsy), Lisa Leguillou (Esmeralda), John Feltch (Baron de Charlus, Lord Byron and Don Quixote), Natalie Brown (Lady Mulligan) and Nafe Katter (Lord Mulligan).

In January 2009, director David Herskovits staged a new production at the Ohio Theater in Manhattan. This short version, which focused on Kilroy as the American boxer (played by Satya Bhabha), was a re-imagination of the original one-act play Ten Blocks on the Camino Real.

From March 3 to April 8, 2012, the Goodman Theatre in Chicago presented a new version by director Calixto Bieito and playwright Marc Rosich.

During the summer of 2025, the Williamstown Theatre Festival debuted a new production directed by Dustin Wills, starring Pamela Anderson (Marguerite), Nicholas Alexander Chavez (Kilroy), and Whitney Peak (Esmerelda).
