= Philip Kennicott =

American journalist, author, and Pulitzer Prize winner

- Education: Deep Springs College (attended); Yale University (BA, Philosophy, 1988)
- Occupations: Journalist; author; art critic; architecture critic
- Employer: The Washington Post
- Awards: Pulitzer Prize for Criticism (2013); Emmy Award nomination (2006)
- Website: philipkennicott.com

Philip Kennicott is the Pulitzer Prize winning Senior Art and Architecture Critic of The Washington Post.

== Education ==
Kennicott was raised in Schenectady, New York, where he studied piano with composer and pianist Joseph Fennimore. In 1983, he attended Deep Springs College, before transferring to Yale University in 1986. Kennicott graduated summa cum laude with a degree in philosophy in 1988.

== Career ==
Kennicott is the author of Counterpoint: A Memoir of Bach and Mourning (Norton 2020). Kennicott won the 2013 Pulitzer Prize for Criticism. He had twice been a Pulitzer Prize finalist before: in 2012, he was a runner-up for the criticism prize, and in 2000, he was also a finalist for the Pulitzer Prize for Editorial Writing for a series on gun control in the St. Louis Post-Dispatch. In 2015, he was a National Magazine Award finalist in the Essays and Criticism category for an essay he contributed to Virginia Quarterly Review; that piece, "Smuggler," was also selected for the 2015 volume Best American Essays. In 2006, he was an Emmy Award nominee for a Web-based video journal about democracy and oil money in Azerbaijan.

Kennicott served as an editor of several classical music publications in New York City from 1988 to 1995, including Senior Editor of Musical America and Editor of Chamber Music Magazine. He became classical music critic of the Detroit News in 1995, and later Chief Classical Music Critic of the St. Louis Post-Dispatch. In 1999, he joined the Washington Post as Chief Classical Music Critic, before becoming Culture Critic in 2001, and Art and Architecture Critic in 2011. Kennicott is also a former contributing editor at The New Republic, where he wrote articles on classical music, and has served as a reviewer and columnist for Gramophone.

Kennicott's critically acclaimed first book, Counterpoint: A Memoir of Bach and Mourning, was praised by the Wall Street Journal as "a book full of arresting insights about the way music permeates our lives, as well as heartbreaking reflections on the wounds a parent can inflict on a child." He has also contributed introductions to Travis Fox's Remains to be Seen, Richard Giannone's Music in Willa Cather's Fiction and Renato Mirraco's Oscar Wilde's Italian Dream 1875-1900.

Kennicott is a frequent participant in national and international symposia, including the Aspen Ideas Festival, the CATO Institute, and the World Justice Forum IV in the Hague.
