= Janice Weber =

American pianist

- Born: 1950 (age 74–75); New Jersey, U.S.
- Musical career
- Occupation(s): Pianist, author
- Instrument: Piano

Janice Weber (born 1950) is an American pianist and author.

== Music ==
Born in New Jersey, Weber was a precocious musical talent, making her debut at age 12 with the orchestra at New York's Town Hall. She studied with a number of teachers and musicians, such as Cécile Staub Genhart, Walter Hendel, José Echániz, and Eugene List. Weber graduated summa cum laude from the Eastman School of Music, where she studied with Cécile Genhart and Eugene List. Following graduation, she continued her studies in New York City with Nadia Reisenberg and was a fellowship student at Tanglewood for two summers.

Weber has appeared with the American Composers Orchestra, Boston Civic Symphony, Boston Pops, Chautauqua Symphony, New Hampshire Symphony, Sarajevo Philharmonic, Sarasota Pops, and Syracuse Symphony. Her solo performances have been at the White House, Carnegie Hall, Wigmore Hall, Weill Hall, National Gallery of Art, Boston’s Symphony Hall, the 92nd Street Y, Merkin Hall, and the Newport Festival. Internationally, she has appeared in Yugoslavia, Turkey, and the Baltic States under the auspices of the US Information Service. At the invitation of the American Liszt Society, she presented recitals and master classes in China.

Her interest in the uncommon avenues of the piano literature led to a world premiere recording of Liszt’s 1838 Transcendental Etudes. Time Magazine wrote, “Liszt later simplified these pieces into the still ferociously difficult Transcendental Etudes (1852 version) for fear that no one else could play them. There may now be several fire-eating piano virtuosos who can execute the original notes, but few can liberate the prophetic music they contain as masterfully as Janice Weber does here.”

Her eclectic recordings include Rachmaninoff’s complete transcriptions (IMP); with the Lydian Quartet, Leo Ornstein’s vast Piano Quintet (New World Records); flute and piano works of Sigfrid Karg-Elert; and waltz transcriptions of Godowsky, Rosenthal, and Friedman (IMP). For VAI, Weber recorded Liszt’s last Hungarian Rhapsody, one of only two living pianists to be included in a compendium of historic performances by nineteen artists. This recording subsequently won the International Liszt Prize. Her recording of a number of Leo Ornstein’s piano works was released by Naxos in June 2002 to significant acclaim in both the American and European press.

Weber is a member of the piano faculty at the Boston Conservatory and the Boston Conservatory Chamber Players. She is a contributor to the Musical Times (London), Clavier, and other music publications. She has been an adjudicator for the National Endowment for the Arts and has served on juries for the Gilmore Foundation, the American Piano Association, the Boston Amateur Pianists Competition, and the Hilton Head International Competition.

== Author ==
Weber has a second career as a writer of fiction. Her first book, "The Secret Life of Eva Hathaway" was released in 1985. Weber's books are noted for their bawdy, dark humor and their female protagonists. The books have spanned different genres, from romantic comedy ("The Secret Life of Eva Hathaway") to a culinary murder mystery ("Devil's Food").

As a writer, Weber has perhaps received the most attention for her books about the Bond-esque female spy Leslie Frost, "Frost the Fiddler" and its sequel "Hot Ticket". Nearly all of her books contain, at some point, a reference to the world of classic music; in the Frost books, the music world is central to the plot. Frost the Fiddler (St. Martin’s Press) was chosen a Notable Book of the Year by the New York Times. She has written two screenplays and is currently at work on her sixth novel.

== Personal facts ==
Weber lives with her husband, John Newton, a recording engineer, in Boston, Massachusetts.

== Discography ==
- 1989 Liszt Transcendental Studies (1838 Version), IMP Masters
- 1989 Wien, Weber and Strauss, IMP Masters
- 1993 Rachmaninov transcriptions, IMP Classics
- 1994 Liszt: The 19 Hungarian Rhapsodies: Played by 19 Great Pianists, VAI Audio
- 1997 Exotic Impressions: Flute Works by Karg-Elert with flutist Douglas Worthen, Leonarda Productions
- 1997 Leo Ornstein: Piano Quintet & String Quartet No. 3, New World
- 2002 Leo Ornstein: Piano Sonatas Nos. 4 & 7, Naxos American Classics
- 2010 Cascade of Roses: A Piano Bouquet, Dorian Sono Luminus
- 2015 Seascapes, Sono Luminus

== Bibliography ==
- (1985) The Secret Life of Eva Hathaway
- (1991) Customs Violations
- (1994) Frost the Fiddler
- (1996) Devil's Food (book)
- (1998) Hot Ticket (book)
- (2007) School of Fortune
- (2012) Swing Set
