= Bradford Township, Minnesota =

Bradford Township is the name of some places in the U.S. state of Minnesota:

- Bradford Township, Isanti County, Minnesota
- Bradford Township, Wilkin County, Minnesota

== See also ==
- Bradford Township (disambiguation)
