= Robert Silverman (pianist) =

Canadian pianist

Robert Silverman CM
- Born: May 25, 1938 (age 88); Montreal
- Occupations: Pianist and piano pedagogue

Robert Herschel Silverman, CM, born May 25, 1938, in Montreal is a noted Canadian pianist and piano pedagogue. He was made a Member of the Order of Canada in 2013. In 1998 he became the inaugural recipient of the Paul de Hueck and Norman Walford Career Achievement Award of the Ontario Arts Foundation. His widely acclaimed 10-CD recording of all thirty-two Beethoven sonatas was short-listed for a Juno Award for Best Classical Album: Solo or Chamber Ensemble. His Liszt recording was awarded the 1977 Grand Prix du disque by the Budapest Liszt Society. He lives in Vancouver with his wife and occasional duet partner, pianist Ellen (Nivert) Silverman.

== Education ==
Although Silverman showed precocious outstanding musical ability (e.g. giving his first recital at age 6 and soloing with the Montreal Symphony Orchestra at 14), he initially chose to study engineering, deciding only in his early 20s to switch to a professional career in music as a pianist. He has commented on this very belated beginning, almost unheard of for a pianist of his high standing and accomplishments, in an interview with Marsha Lederman of the Globe and Mail in 2008. He received a BA (Sir George Williams, now Concordia) in 1960, B MUS performance (McGill) (1964); M MUS performance & literature (1965), Artist Diploma (1968), DMA performance (1970) at the Eastman School of Music. He studied 1961-3 on a Canada Council grant at the Vienna Academy of Music, studying with Richard Hauser. Returning to North America, he studied with Dorothy Morton at McGill University and with Cécile Staub Genhart at the Eastman School of Music. In 1967 he won first prize (piano) at the Jeunesses musicales of Canada National Competition and performed twice at Expo 67. In 1970 he won the Allied Arts Piano Competition in Chicago, earning him a recital debut in Orchestra Hall.

== Performing career ==
Silverman has enjoyed a lifetime of admiring critical notices. After a 1984 London recital, the critic Bryce Morrison described him as 'a player of formidable strength and mastery... his tonal resources are wonderfully rich and full... Silverman's magisterial command of both technique and idiom could hardly have been more convincing... here is a powerful, highly skilled orator of the keyboard, attributes not to be taken lightly in an age of so much impersonal expertise'). After a New York City recital in 1984 New York Times critic Bernard Holland wrote 'Robert Silverman, the Canadian pianist, evidently likes to do things in a big way.' his program...offered continuous opportunities for pianism on a grand scale, and he was careful to take advantage of them all. A selection of later reviews can be found at Silverman's website. 'Many aspects of Silverman's playing are frequently noted: a polished technique, an extraordinary range of tonal palette, an uncanny ability to sing his way into the heart of a phrase, and probing interpretations of the most complex works in the repertoire.'

Silverman has a wide-ranging repertoire which includes 40 concertos. He has favoured the keyboard works of Beethoven, Brahms, Liszt and Mozart. He has performed complete cycles of the piano sonatas of Beethoven (beginning in 1996), and the Piano sonatas of Mozart (2006). He has performed and recorded Beethoven's Diabelli Variations. He has performed with every major Canadian orchestra and also with the BBC Symphony, Chicago Symphony Orchestra, and Sydney Symphony Orchestra, the Boston Pops, and the Leningrad Philharmonic, among others. He has toured throughout Europe, North America, Australia, the Far East and the Soviet Union. He has played under the batons of Seiji Ozawa, John Eliot Gardiner, Zdenek Macal, Gerard Schwarz, Neeme Järvi, the late Kiril Kondrashin and Sergiu Comissiona. Summer festivals at which he has appeared include in Canada: Music at the Sharon, Courtenay, Elora and Vancouver Chamber Music festivals; and in the United States the Chautauqua, Peninsula and Ravinia festivals. He has played with the St. Lawrence, Curtis, Fine Arts, Lafayette, Orford, and Purcell string quartets.

He has made a strong commitment to Canadian composers throughout his career. He premiered Jacques Hétu's Concerto in 1970 with the Quebec Symphony Orchestra and both performed and recorded it with the BBC Symphony Orchestra during Musicanada in 1977. With the Toronto Symphony he gave the first concert performances of Somers's Second Piano Concerto (5, 6 Dec 1978). He premiered Michael Conway Baker 's Concerto for Piano and Orchestra (1976) with the CBC Vancouver Orchestra, a performance which earned the composer a Juno Award, Jean Coulthard’s Piano Concerto ((1963, rev. 1967)), Alexina Louie’s Piano Concerto (1985) with the Manitoba Chamber Orchestra, Hétu's Sonata (1986) and Keith Hamel's Thrust.

Silverman's discography includes over 30 CDs and a dozen LPs. His recording of Liszt's piano music received a Grand Prix du Disque from the Liszt Society of Budapest in 1977. His 7-CD album of all the Mozart Sonatas was released in 2010. Silverman recently began performing and recording works by Chopin His recording Chopin's Last Waltzwas Stereophile Magazine's *Best of the Month* album for February, 2018. As Music Editor Robert Baird wrote in his review: "Silverman's Chopin is an unqualified success...[his] conceptions...delve deeply into the composer's inherent passions for his music and his love of melody. The overall architecture of Silverman's playing is solid and sure... The well-known Fantasie in f, Op.49, particularly its placid Adagio, benefits from Silverman's deft, lingering touch." He has recorded for EMI, Stereophile, Marquis Classics, Orpheum Masters, Isomike, and CBC Records. Silverman is a Steinway Artist.

== Academic and teaching career ==
Silverman was Professor of Music, Piano at the University of British Columbia from 1973 to 2003 and was Director of its School of Music from 1991 to 1995. He was awarded an honorary doctorate (hon D LITT) (UBC) in 2004. His pupils there have included two first prize-winners of the CBC Talent Competition - Sharon Krause and David Swan (Swan was also the first winner of the S.C. Eckhardt-Gramatté prize). Silverman became artist-in-residence at Toronto's Koffler Centre of the Arts in 2002. In 2008 he initiated the Dorothy Morton Visiting Artist series at McGill University's Schulich School of Music and again appeared on the series on its tenth anniversary in 2018.

Earlier, he taught at the University of Wisconsin-Milwaukee 1970 to 1973, the University of California, Santa Barbara 1969 to 1970, and was pianist-in-residence 1967 to 1969 at Nazareth College, Rochester, N. Y.

In 2018, Silverman and his wife endowed The Robert and Ellen Silverman Piano Concerto Competition, to be held every second year.

== Selected discography ==
- Beethoven 32 Sonatas (10 CDs)
- Brahms Piano Music vol I-III
- The Early Recordings
- Aaron Copland: Piano Sonata, Passecaglia, 4 Piano Blues, Cat and the Mouse
- Rachmaninoff: The Two Sonatas
- César Franck: Prelude, Chorale & Fugue; Prelude, Aria & Final
- Liszt B Minor Sonata
- Beethoven: Diabelli Variations, 32 Variations in c
- Mozart: The Complete Sonatas (7 CDs)
- Chopin: The Last Waltz
- Chopin: The Four Scherzi and Polonaise Fantaisie.
