= Berlitz: Introduction to French =

Berlitz: Introduction to French, a cycle of eight short songs for voice and piano composed by Joseph Fennimore, received its first performance on 19 May 1971 at Carnegie Recital Hall in New York City. Sung at its premiere "with high comic flair and delectable histrionics" by mezzo-soprano Joyce Castle, with the composer at the keyboard, the song cycle "proved to be a delicate artistic triumph: a total success with the audience and a resourceful idea realized with airy invention" and was also termed "an instant hit." Juxtaposing simple and serious phrases typical of those found in teach-yourself language guides for travelers—one song, for instance, is called "When You Go Shopping"; another, "In an Emergency"—the lighthearted work was written in the winter and spring of 1970-71 and dedicated to the composer's patron at the time, Hildegarde Lasell Watson. Permission to use the Berlitz name was given by A. Edward Miller, president of Berlitz Publishing and an enthusiastic music-lover. G. Schirmer Inc. published the score in 1974, and it has since had numerous performances worldwide.

Castle and the composer recorded a CD version released in 1989 by Albany Records. Citing the "energetic élan" of Castle's performance on the disk, the November–December 1990 issue of the NATS Journal, the official publication of the National Association of Teachers of Singing, commended the Fennimore piece as "fun, particularly appealing" and "cleverly crafted."
