= Stewart L. Gordon =

Stewart Gordon
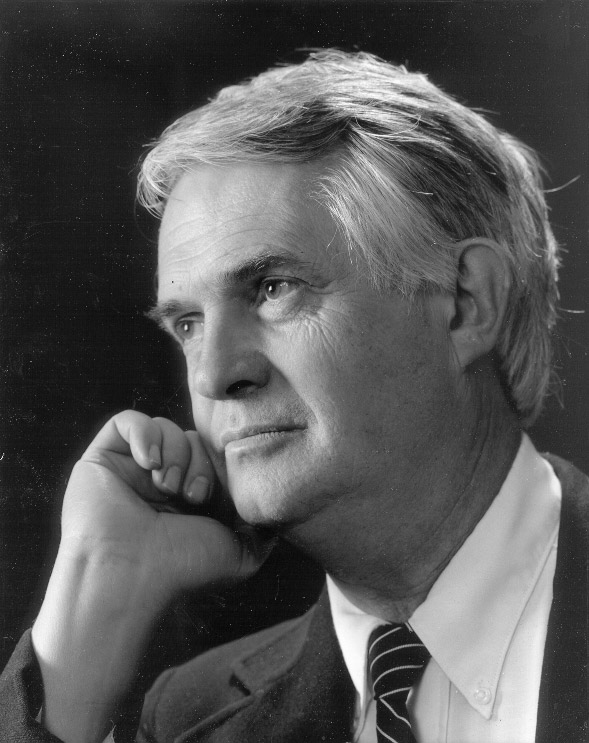
- Stewart Gordon (1989)

Background information
- Born: Stewart Lynell Gordon; August 28, 1930 (age 96)
- Origin: Kansas, US
- Genre: Classical
- Occupations: Pianist, composer, author, editor
- Instrument: Piano
- Years active: 1960–present
- Website: www.stewartgordon.com

Stewart Lynell Gordon is an American musician, teacher, writer, editor, composer, and impresario. Gordon is Emeritus Professor of Keyboard Studies at the USC Thornton School of Music of the University of Southern California.

As a student, Stewart Gordon studied with a number of prominent pedagogues and concert artists including Olga Samaroff, Walter Gieseking, Cécile Staub Genhart, and Adele Marcus. As a performing pianist, Gordon toured extensively throughout Europe, Asia and the Americas. Gordon's commercially issued recordings include works by Beethoven, Schubert, Schumann, Chopin, Scriabin, Ellis Kohs, Luis de Frietas-Branco, and the complete Rachmaninoff Preludes, although almost all of these are long out of print and only obtainable secondhand. He is officially a Steinway Artist.

His academic career has included posts at Wilmington College in Ohio, the University of Maryland, where he served as Dean of the Music School, and Queens College, City University of New York, where he served as a Provost and a Vice-President in the Academic Affairs department.

== Recordings ==
- Schubert Sonata Op. 143 and Schumann Sonata Op. 11. Washington Records, WR 425, 1965
- The Complete Preludes of Rachmaninoff, Vol. I, Op. 23 and Op. 3. Washington Records, WR 426, 1967
- The Complete Preludes of Rachmaninoff, Vol. II Op. 32 and 2 early preludes. Washington Records 427, 1966
- Schubert German Dances, Washington Records, WR 441, 1968
- Stewart Gordon Plays Piano Favorites Beethoven, Scriabin, Debussy, DeFalla. Reformation Records, RR1011, 1968
- The Preludes of Freitas-Branco. Gulbenkian Foundation, 1971

== Composer ==
As a composer Gordon has primarily channeled his efforts into musical theater, and his shows have been successfully produced in New York City, Washington, D.C., Savannah, Hollywood, and Hawaii. His musical Libby generated renewed national interest in the historic cabaret performer Libby Holman. Earlier in his career he also wrote the music for the historic pageant "Spirit of the Navy", a project initiated by the Chief of Naval Operations to celebrate the US Navy's 200th birthday. He is involved with book writer Robert Weller in creating a new musical based on the history of Palm Springs, California.

== Competitions ==
He founded the William Kapell International Piano Competition and acted as its director for 15 years. In New York City he founded the Cultural Heritage Competition and the Great Gospel Competition. He is a past President of the Virginia Waring International Piano Competition, and holds the title of Director of International Outreach. In Savannah, Georgia, he founded the Savannah Onstage Music Festivals, as well as its American Traditions Competition, and acted as their artistic director for 14 years. He has served as an adjudicator for many international competitions, including the Gina Bachauer, William Kapell, Rosa Ponselle, Virginia Waring and the finals of the Canadian Music Competitions, and Music Teachers National Competitions at the regional and national levels.

== Entrepreneurial projects ==
- 1967– 1985 Founder and Director of University of Maryland International Piano Festival and William Kapell International Piano Competition
- 1986–1988 Established the Cultural Heritage Competitions in New York City, a competitive festival event for pre-college students featuring special categories of literature: European, Black, Latin, Jewish, East European (piano, strings, winds, voice).
- 1988–2002 Founder and Director of the Savannah Onstage music festival and the American Traditions Competition

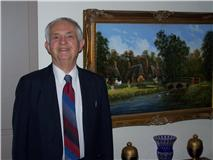
Stewart Gordon, 2010

=== Music ===
- Music through midi Dennis Alexander and Dennis Thurmond, 36 teaching pieces in three volumes for digital keyboard programmed to general midi, Alfred Music Publications, Van Nuys, California, 1994
- Beethoven Piano Sonatas, Vols. 1, 2, 3, 4 Edited by Stewart Gordon, Alfred Music Publications, Van Nuys, California, 2003, 2005, 2008, 2009
- Debussy, Etudes, Alfred Music Publications, Van Nuys, California, 2015
- Mozart Piano Sonatas, Vol. I, Alfred Music Publications, Van Nuys, California, 2019

== Publications ==
- The Well Tempered Keyboard Teacher, Schirmer Books, New York: First edition, 1991, co-authors Marienne Uszler and Elyse Mach; Second Edition, 2000, co-authors Marienne Uszler and Scott McBride Smith.
- Etudes for Piano Teachers, Reflections on the Teacher's Art, Oxford University Press, New York; Hardcover edition, 1995 paperback edition, 2001.
- A History of Keyboard Literature for the Piano and its Forerunners], Schirmer Books, New York; Hardcover edition 1996; paperback edition, 2002.
- Mastering the Art of Performance, Oxford University Press, New York, 2005
- Planning Your Piano Success, Oxford University Press, New York 2007
- Beethoven's 32 Piano Sonatas. A Handbook for Performers, Oxford University Press, New York, 2017
