= Edward Bradford =

Edward Bradford may refer to:

- Edward Bradford (1798–1871), founder of Pine Hill Plantation in Leon County, Florida
- Edward Green Bradford (1819–1884), Delaware politician and United States federal judge
- Sir Edward Bradford, 1st Baronet (1836–1911), Commissioner of Police of the Metropolis, 1890–1903
- Edward Green Bradford II (1848–1928), United States federal judge
- Edward A. Bradford (1813–1872), lawyer and unsuccessful nominee to the United States Supreme Court
- Sir Edward Eden Bradford (1858–1935), British Royal Navy admiral
- Edward S. Bradford (1842–1914), American wool manufacture and politician in Massachusetts
- Edward Bradford (botanist) (1802–1888), British army surgeon and botanist who discovered certain endemic flora of Trinidad and Tobago
- Sir Edward Montagu Andrew Bradford, 3rd Baronet (1910–1952) of the Bradford baronets
- (Sir) Edward Alexander Slade Bradford, 5th Baronet (born 1952) of the Bradford baronets

== See also ==
- Bradford (name)
