= 14th Massachusetts Regiment =

- Active: 1775-1781
- Allegiance: Continental Congress of the United States
- Type: Infantry
- Part of: Massachusetts Line
- Engagements: Saratoga and Monmouth

Commanders
- Notable commanders: Colonel Gamaliel Bradford

The 14th Massachusetts Regiment was raised on September 16, 1776, under Colonel Gamaliel Bradford at Boston, Massachusetts. The regiment would see action at the Battle of Saratoga and the Battle of Monmouth. The regiment was disbanded on January 1, 1781, at West Point, New York. The Colonel's young son, Gamaliel Bradford III was a private in this regiment.
