= Joseph Fennimore =

American composer, pianist and teacher (born 1940)

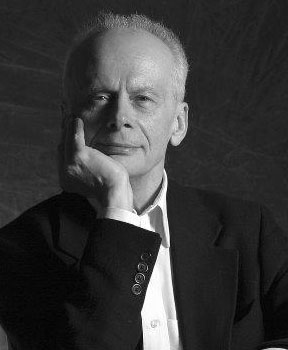

Background information
- Born: April 16, 1940 (age 86); Manhattan, New York, United States
- Genre: Classical
- Occupations: Composer, pianist
- Instrument: Piano
- Years active: 1952–present

Joseph Fennimore (born 16 April 1940) is an American composer, pianist and teacher best known for his works for piano and chamber ensembles, ranked by Pulitzer Prize-winning critic Philip Kennicott as "one of this country's finest composers." His music has been performed and broadcast worldwide and included in the Metropolitan Opera Studio and New York City Ballet repertories.

== Early life and education ==
Joseph Fennimore was born in Manhattan's Bellevue Hospital. He began formal music studies in upstate New York at the Schenectady Conservatory of Music, his principal teacher being its founder and director, Joseph G. Derrick, graduate of the New England Conservatory in the piano class of Ethel Newcomb, Theodor Leschetizky's first American assistant. In his twelfth year Fennimore was chosen to perform a piano concerto with the Schenectady Symphony Orchestra at that city's historic Proctor's Theater. The first Fennimore compositions to be performed publicly were choral works presented in 1957 by the Scotia-Glenville Choralaires, under Carl M. Steubing, which annually toured the northeast.

Fennimore was one of eight high school juniors to participate in the Eastman School of Music's experimental accelerated program in Rochester, New York, during which the first year of his baccalaureate was completed over the summer months before and after his senior year in high school. The first summer he studied piano with guest teacher Eugene List; the second summer he studied with Eastman piano chair Cécile Staub Genhart, who would become one of his chief musical influences. It was in the fall of 1958 that Fennimore met fellow Eastman freshman, the pianist Gordon Hibberd, who has been his life partner ever since.

Genhart arranged summer piano studies for Fennimore with retired Eastman faculty member Sandor Vas; Vas enlisted Hildegarde Lasell Watson (to whom the song cycle Berlitz: Introduction to French would be dedicated) to become Fennimore's patron; in 1962 she arranged Fennimore's visit to and audition for composer and critic Virgil Thomson (Watson's mother, Jessie Maud Keeler Lasell, had been Thomson's own patron), who urged him to move to New York City. Upon graduating from Eastman that year with a B.M. degree with distinction and a performer's certificate, Fennimore entered the Juilliard School of Music in Manhattan that autumn as a student of Rosina Lhévinne, receiving an M.S. degree from Juilliard in 1965 with the Loeb and Van Cliburn Alumni Awards.

== Career ==
Fennimore, an ASCAP composer, at first interspersed composing with other musical activities ranging from performing as concert and recital soloist (encouraged by Bedford Pace III, director of public relations in North America for the British Tourist Authority) in America, Japan and Europe, to assistant conducting on Broadway for No, No, Nanette music director and arranger Buster Davis, writing music criticism pseudonymously and co-founding, with Gordon Hibberd, and directing (1972–76) the Hear America First concert series that was broadcast nationally on National Public Radio. He also taught piano at Princeton University as well as piano, piano literature and music literature at the College of St. Rose in Albany, New York. Since the early 1970s he has devoted his energies more exclusively to his compositional efforts, new works introduced and often performed by mezzo-soprano Joyce Castle, cellist Ted Hoyle, harpsichordist Elaine Comparone and pianists Larry Graham, Dennis Helmrich, Jeffrey Middleton, Dan Teitler, Marthanne Verbit and Juana Zayas. Fennimore currently teaches private piano lessons at The Music Studio in Albany, New York.

== Honors and awards ==
Among Fennimore's citations are the Loeb Memorial Award and Van Cliburn Award (both from Juilliard for post-graduate study); the Hour of Music Award from the Colony Club of New York, which he won in 1964; and first prize in piano in the National Federation of Music Club's Young Artist Competition in 1965. This last award brought Fennimore four years of management from the federation, which included a United States Information Agency-sponsored tour of Japan and dozens of concerts throughout the United States, especially in the south, where he received the Kentucky Colonel and Arkansas Traveler awards from the governors of those states. He also received a Rockefeller grant (with renewal); a Fulbright grant (with renewal) in 1967-69, which enabled him to study with Harold Craxton, O.B.E., in the United Kingdom; and first prize in Barcelona's Concurso Internacional Maria Canals in 1969. In addition, since 1976 he has been recipient of annual ASCAP awards. In 2013 Fennimore received a citation from the New York State Music Teachers Association recognizing his "outstanding contributions as a performer, master teacher, coach and world-renowned composer."

== Personal life ==
Long maintaining one home in Manhattan and another in upstate New York, Fennimore and Gordon Hibberd were among the first tenants at the landmark Westbeth Artists Community Housing in Greenwich Village. They currently reside in Albany.

== Compositional overview ==
Fennimore's music, especially that featuring the keyboard, is often of a technical sophistication and chromatic complexity that stretch the Western tonal tradition it rises from; such exotica as Cathay and Sea of Sand, evoking Chinese and Middle Eastern idioms respectively, similarly expand on it in a "continual metamorphosis" of his style. At the same time, his reworkings of Schumann's A-minor sonata for violin and piano and Tchaikovsky's second piano concerto (premiered in 1986 by the Chicago Symphony Orchestra under James Levine) remain loyally romantic. Beyond a nostalgic or "bittersweet" lyricism often commented on, an additional distinguishing component of Fennimore's style is an elevated wittiness and "seriously playful sport" exemplified by his satiric take on language instruction, the aforementioned Berlitz: Introduction to French, and Foxtrot, a fanciful tribute to bygone popular musical genres.

== Catalog of works ==
=== Opera and theater ===
- Don't Call Me by My Right Name: One-Act Opera, after the short story by James Purdy; libretto by the composer (1974)
- Eventide: An Opera in One Act, after the short story by James Purdy; libretto by the composer (1974)
- Isadora: An Opera [unfinished]; libretto by the composer (1974)
- Keeping Time: A Performance Work for One Person and a Piano; text by the composer (1990?)

=== Orchestral works ===
- Concerto Piccolo for Piano and Small Orchestra (1962; rev. 1976)
- Concerto for piano and orchestra (1964)
- Concerto for cello and orchestra (1974)
- Echoes: Duet for Mezzo-soprano and Tenor (or Soprano) and Orchestra (1974)
- Sunset for orchestra (1980)
- Crystal Stairs [second concerto] for piano and orchestra (1987)
- Confetti for piano four-hands and orchestra (1990)
- Tenor Concerto for trombone and orchestra (2003); for cello and orchestra (2004)
- Adieu for orchestra (2012)

=== Chamber works ===
- Sonata for Clarinet and Piano (1968)
- Rhapsody for Unaccompanied Violin (1974)
- Sonata for Cello and Piano (1974)
- Trio for Oboe, Cello and Keyboard (Piano or Harpsichord) (1975)
- Quartet for Clarinet, Viola, Violoncello and Piano (after Vinteuil) (1976; rev. 1978)
- Sonata for Flute and Piano (1977)
- Swann in Love: Sonata in One Movement for cello, violin or viola and piano (1978; rev. 1981)
- Telephone Numbers for xylophone ensemble (1979)
- Three Romances for Clarinet and Piano (1982–85)
- Three Romances for Flute and Piano (1982–85)
- Three Romances for Flute, Clarinet and Piano (1982–85)
- Sextet for Woodwind Quintet and Piano (1985)
- Siyum HaSefer (The Torah's Completion) for oboe, clarinet, violin, viola, cello, percussion and piano (1985?)
- Second Sextet for Woodwind Quintet and Piano (1986)
- Computer Music for harpsichord (1988)
- Second Sonata for Flute and Piano (1988)
- Pavane for String Quartet (1992)
- Second Sonata for Cello and Piano (1992)
- Passacalle for Organ (1994)
- Hotel Trio for violin, cello and piano (1995)
- On the Green for organ (1996)
- Sea Lullaby for horn and piano (1997)
- Ten Romances for cello and piano (1999)
- Duo for Oboe and Keyboard (Piano or Harpsichord) (2002)
- Molinos de Viento ("Windmills"): Second Trio for violin, cello and keyboard (2003)
- Second Sonata for Violin and Piano (2007)
- Spring Sonata for flute or violin and piano (2007)
- Romance for cello and piano (2014)

=== Piano solo ===
- Fantasy (1963)
- Waltzes (1963?-69)
- Bits and Pieces: Three Piano Pieces for Children (1964)
- First Sonata (1964)
- Fourth Sonata (1964)
- First Sonatina (1965)
- Second Sonata for Pianoforte (1965)
- Variations on a Theme of Beethoven (1966; rev. 1972)
- Third Sonata (1967)
- Shards and Snippets (1968-2003)
- Songs and Dances (1969)
- Channel One (Second Sonatina) (1973)
- Armistice: Three Pieces for Piano Solo (Марш [March], Sans Souci, Ebenholz und Elfenbein) (1975–77)
- Foxtrot: Piano Sonata in Two Movements (Blues, An Old Soft-Shoe) (1977)
- Titles Waltz (after Max Steiner) (1977)
- Two Rags: The Woolworth Man, The Hen's Snuffbox (1979)
- Bitter-Sweet: Four Little Pieces (for Very Old Children) (1980)
- Crystal Stairs (1983)
- Romances for Piano, Book 1 (1983-2004)
- Variations (1983)
- Etude (1984)
- Jessica's Rag (1984)
- Tango (1984)
- Waltz (1984)
- Tango II (1985)
- Etude (1988)
- Doldrums and Daydreams: Nine Bagatelles (1993–94)
- Passacalle (1994)
- Twenty-four Quirks for Piano Solo (1994)
- Practical Prelude (1999)
- The Studio (2000)
- Waltz: The Lady Is Not a Tramp (A Phantom Transcription) (2000)
- Ballroom Waltz (after Wollenhaupt) (2002)
- In the Style of a Mexican Popular Song c. 1934 (2002)
- Doll Waltz (after Poldini) (2003)
- Escorial (2004)
- Cathay: Pieces for Piano (2005)
- Third Sonatina (2005)
- Tourmaline: On the Loss of a Jewel (Theme, Variations and Coda on an Ostinato) (2005)
- Sonatinella (2006)
- Five Rivers (2007)
- Three Pieces for Piano (2009)
- Romances for Piano, Book 2 (2010?-13)
- Clusters (2011)
- Fifth Sonata (2012)
- Monuments: Dover A.F.B., Mesa Verde, Arlington (2013)
- Sixth Sonata (2013)
- From My Window: Variations on a Schubert Theme (2014)
- Shadowboxing or Been There, Done That (Third Rag) (2014)
- Two Bagatelles (2016)
- An Old Refrain for Marthanne's Birthday (2017)
- Meditation on the Last Word (2019)

=== Piano four-hands ===
- Eight Waltzes, Book 1 (1958–74)
- Eight Waltzes, Book 2 (1958–75)
- Crystal Stairs (1980)
- Tarantella (1988)
- Sonatina for 1 Piano, 4 Hands (1998; rev. 1999)

=== Two pianos ===
- Crystal Stairs: Two Pianos (2000)
- Crystal Stairs (Piano Concerto No. 2) (two-piano arrangement) (1984)
- Not Another Waltz (undated) [withdrawn]

=== Choral works ===
- Untitled communion-service music: Kyrie, Gloria, Alleluia, Sanctus and Benedictus, Eucharistic Acclamations, Agnus Dei 1, Agnus Dei 2, Amen for SATB chorus, congregation and organ (1971)
- The Cynic's Song for SATB chorus and piano (1972?)
- Untitled sacred choral-piece set: Ave Maria 1, Ave Maria 2, Love Is the Water of Life, Timor et Tremor, Vere Languores 1, Vere Languores 2 for tenor or soprano solo, SATB chorus and piano (1972)
- Three Psalms: How They Are Increased that Trouble Me! (Psalm 3), Rebuke Me Not (Psalm 6), The Lord Is My Shepherd (Psalm 23) for SATB chorus a cappella and with piano (1999)

=== Vocal works ===
(Songs, song cycles, song sets; accompanied by piano except as indicated)

- My Heart Leaps Up When I Behold, text by William Wordsworth (1961)
- Birthday Song, text by the composer (1970)
- Berlitz: Introduction to French, text from Berlitz French for Travelers (1971)
- I'm a Singer, text by the composer (1971)
- God Is Dead, text by the composer (1973)
- Seven Songs from Shakespeare, text by William Shakespeare (1973)
- Echoes: Duet for Soprano and Tenor, text by Gerard Manley Hopkins (1974)
- Death, Be Not Proud, text by John Donne (1976)
- I Once Was a Maid, text by Robert Burns (1976)
- Mary Weeps for Her Child, text anon. (1976)
- Party Songs, text by the composer (1976)
- Untitled four-song set [Party Songs prototype], text by the composer (1976)
- Deine Liebe, text by Robert Schumann (1977)
- Infant Joy, text by William Blake (1977)
- Inscape: Poems by Gerard Manley Hopkins, text by Gerard Manley Hopkins (1977)
- Shadow and Substance, text by William Wordsworth (1977)
- Days and Dreams, text by Algernon Charles Swinburne (1978)
- I Don't Know How to Say It, text anon. (1979)
- A Musical Offering, text by Donald Richie (1979)
- Prayer, text by the composer (1980)
- So Much Depends Upon, text by William Carlos Williams (1981)
- A Star Looks Down on Me, text by Thomas Hardy (1981)
- Julia, text by Lytton Strachey (1982)
- My Heart, text by Sappho (1984)
- Silence, text by William Carlos Williams (1984)
- Good Bye, Good Night, text by the composer (1985)
- A Great Time, text by W.H. Davies (1991)
- Ruthless Rhymes for P.C. Times, text by the composer (1994; rev. 2005)
- I Must Not Tell, text by Vita Sackville-West (1995)
- Moose, text by Johanna Keller (1996)
- Songs [Poems by Herbert Woodward Martin], text by Herbert Woodward Martin (1998)
- Sea of Sand for countertenor or mezzo-soprano and chamber ensemble; text by the composer (2002)

=== Transcriptions, arrangements and interpolations ===
- Franz Liszt: Coda for Sixth Rhapsodie for piano (1965)
- J.S. Bach: Cadenza for Third Movement, Klavier Concerto in F Minor for piano (1983)
- Carl Maria von Weber: Rondo from Piano Sonata No. 1, Op. 24, amended, for piano (1970; rev. 2008)
- Franz Joseph Haydn: Cadenzas for First and Second Movements, D Major Concerto for piano (1982)
- Pyotr Ilyich Tchaikovsky: Piano Concerto No. 2, amended, for piano and orchestra (1986; rev. 2012)
- J.S. Bach: Preludio IV, Well-Tempered Clavier, Book 2, ornamentation, for piano (1993)
- Sergei Rachmaninoff: Tears (Suite No. 1, Op. 3, No. 3), transcribed for piano (1994)
- Louis Moreau Gottschalk: O Loving Heart (orig. song text by Henry C. Watson), arranged for SATB chorus and piano (1999)
- Robert Schumann: Six Études in Canonic Form for Pedal Piano, Op. 56, transcribed for violin, cello and piano (1999)
- J.S. Bach: Cadenza for Sinfonia No. 6, BWV 792 ("Lucie's Cadenza") for piano (2003)
- Orlando Gibbons: Three Pieces from Parthenia, transcribed for piano (2004)
- Robert Schumann: Sonata for Violin and Piano in A Minor, Op. 105, No. 1, transcribed for cello and piano (2008)
- W.A. Mozart: Three Cadenzas for First Movement, C Minor Concerto, K. 491 for piano (2009)
- Maurice Ravel: Sonata in Four Parts for Violin and Cello, amended and transcribed for violin, cello and piano (2010)
- Hugo Frey: Viennese Refrain, arranged for cello solo (2014)
- Jean Sibelius: Valse Triste, Op. 44, No. 1, transcribed for piano (2014)
- Aleksandr Scriabin: Prelude for Piano, Op. 9, No. 1, for the Left Hand, amended for one or both hands (2019)
