= Connecticut Repertory Theatre =

Coordinates: 41°48′15″N 72°14′40″W

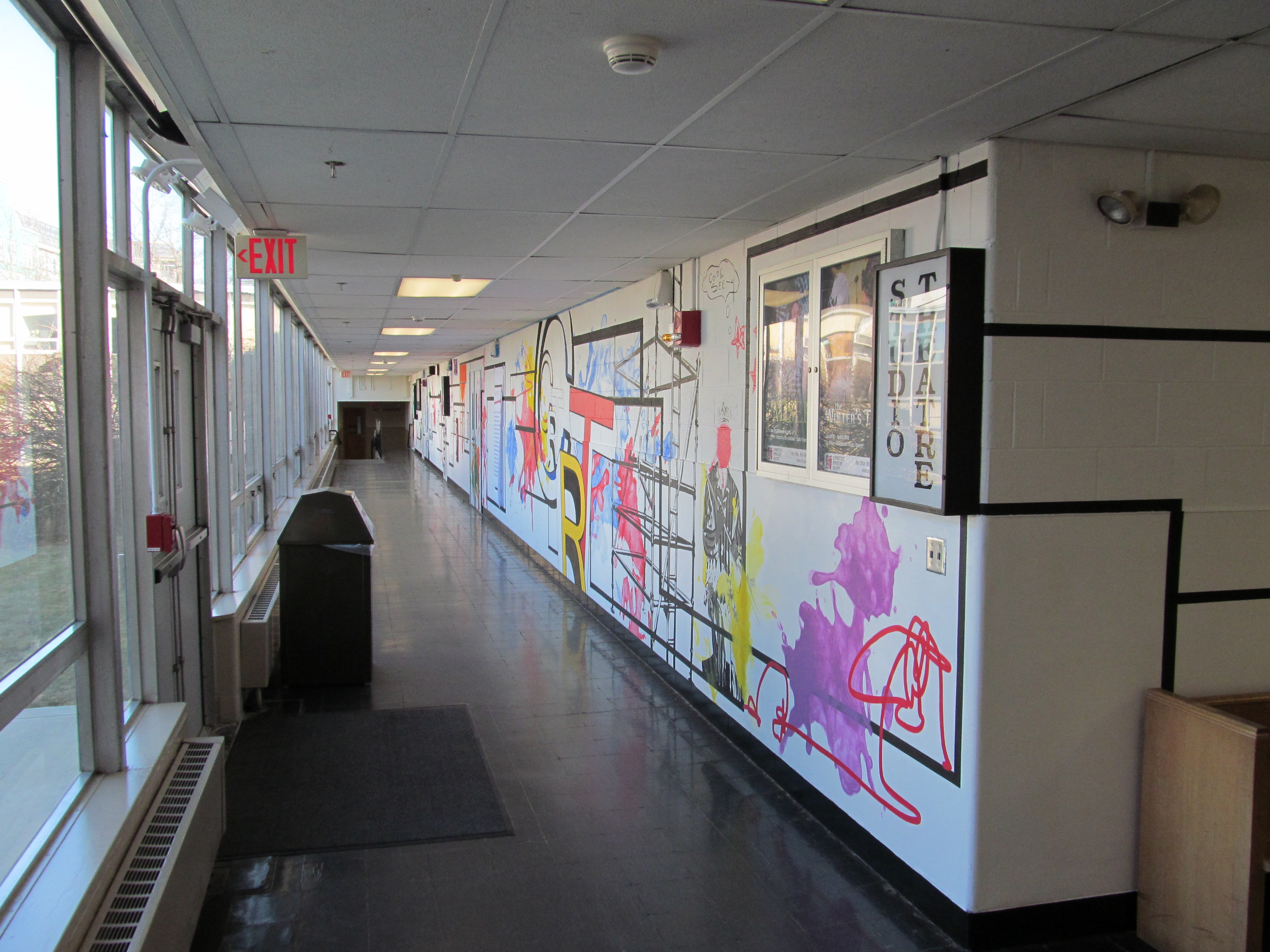
- Lobby of the Studio Theatre
- Type: Theatre Company
- Location: 820 Bolton Road, Storrs, Connecticut
- Region served: Northeastern Connecticut
- Artistic Director: Megan Monaghan Rivas
- Managing Director: Michelle Polgar
- Website: crt.uconn.edu

Connecticut Repertory Theatre (CRT) at the University of Connecticut is a professional theatre run by the Department of Dramatic Arts, a part of the School of Fine Arts. The complex is located on the main UConn campus in Storrs, Connecticut.

Its current artistic director is Megan Monaghan Rivas; past artistic directors included Michael Bradford and Vincent J. Cardinal. Its current managing director is Michelle Polgar; past managing directors include Frank Mack, Matthew J. Pugliese and Robert Wildman.

Although a part of a university, the CRT is a major presence in the theatre world and sells more than twelve thousand tickets each year. CRT offers a subscription series of six plays and musicals each year—two in the 116-seat Studio Theatre, two in the 240-seat Nafe Katter Theatre, and two in the 485-seat Harriet S. Jorgensen Theatre. Productions range from dramas such as The Children's Hour by Lillian Hellman to more light-hearted fare such as The Odd Couple by Neil Simon. Prominent theatre personalities who have appeared in CRT productions include actors Kim Hunter, Judy Kaye, and Aleta Mitchell, directors James Warwick and Larry Carpenter, choreographer Tony Stevens, and designer Dennis Parichy.

CRT and the Department of Dramatic Arts also run the puppet arts program founded by Frank Ballard.
