= William Bradford =

William or Bill Bradford may refer to:

== Arts and entertainment ==
- William Bradford (painter) (1823–1892), American artist and Arctic explorer
- William Bradford (architect) (1845–1919), British architect of breweries
- William Bradford (cinematographer) (1905–1959), American cinematographer

== Military ==
- William Bradford (Plymouth soldier) (1624–1703), military commander of Plymouth during King Philip's War; son of Governor Bradford
- William Bradford (soldier, born 1771) (1771–1826), U.S. Army officer
- William Bradford (general) (1896–1965), U.S. Army general and Olympic equestrian
- Bill Bradford (British Army officer) (1912–1996), British Army officer in World War II

== Politics and law ==
- William Bradford (governor) (1590–1657), English Governor of Plymouth Colony
- William Bradford (Rhode Island politician) (1729–1808), U.S. Senator
- William Bradford (Attorney General) (1755–1795), American lawyer and judge; second U.S. Attorney General
- William G. Bradford (1925–2008), American diplomat
- R. W. Bradford (Raymond William Bradford, 1947–2005), American political writer
- William C. Bradford (born c. 1964), American lawyer and legal scholar

== Sports ==
- Bill Bradford (footballer) (1903–1984), English footballer
- Bill Bradford (outfielder) (1913–?), American Negro leagues baseball player
- Bill Bradford (pitcher) (1921–2000), American baseball player

== Others ==
- William Bradford (printer, born 1663) (1663–1752), English-born printer in Pennsylvania and New York
- William Bradford (printer, born 1719) (1719–1791), American printer, grandson of the above
- William R. Bradford (1933–2019), American general authority of The Church of Jesus Christ of Latter-day Saints
- William Bradford (murderer) (1946–2008), American convicted murderer and possible serial killer

== Other uses ==
- William Bradford Academy, the former name of a secondary school in Leicestershire, England

== See also ==
- William Bradford Reed (1806–1876), American lawyer, diplomat, journalist, academic
