= David Bradford =

David Bradford may refer to:

- David Bradford (lawyer) (1760–1808), lawyer and deputy attorney-general for Washington County, Pennsylvania
- David Bradford (economist) (1939–2005), American economist and professor of economics and public affairs
- David Bradford (footballer) (born 1953), English retired football midfielder
- David Bradford (photographer) (born 1951), American photographer, video maker, and taxi driver
- D. M. Bradford, Canadian writer
- David Cordley Bradford (1922–2002), British general practitioner
- David Bradford, a character played by Grant Goodeve in the TV series Eight Is Enough

== See also ==
- David Bradford House, historic house in Pennsylvania, USA, home of David Bradford, a leader of the Whiskey Rebellion
