= USS Bradford =

Fletcher-class destroyer

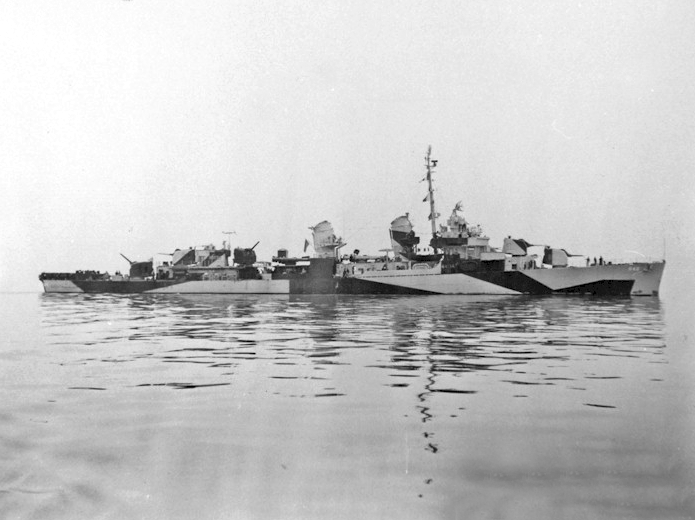
- Broadside view of USS Bradford (DD-545) off Mare Island on 19 October 1944.

History

United States
- Name: USS Bradford (DD-545)
- Namesake: Gamaliel Bradford
- Builder: Bethlehem Shipbuilding, San Pedro, California
- Laid down: 28 April 1942
- Launched: 12 December 1942
- Sponsored by: Mrs. Sarah Bradford Rose
- Commissioned: 12 June 1943
- Decommissioned: 28 September 1961
- Stricken: 1 September 1975
- Fate: Transferred to Hellenic Navy, 27 September 1962

History

Greece
- Name: Thyella (D28)
- Acquired: 27 September 1962
- Stricken: 1981
- Fate: Scrapped

General characteristics
- Class & type: Fletcher-class destroyer
- Displacement: 2,050 tons
- Length: 376 ft 6 in (114.7 m)
- Beam: 39 ft 8 in (12.1 m)
- Draft: 17 ft 9 in (5.4 m)
- Propulsion: 60,000 shp (45 MW); 2 propellers
- Speed: 35 knots (65 km/h; 40 mph)
- Range: 6500 nmi. (12,000 km) @ 15 kt
- Complement: 329
- Armament: 5 × single Mk 12 5 in (127 mm)/38 guns; 5 × twin 40 mm (1.6 in) Bofors AA guns; 7 × single 20 mm (0.8 in) Oerlikon AA guns; 2 × quintuple 21 in (533 mm) torpedo tubes; 6 × single depth charge throwers; 2 × depth charge racks

USS Bradford (DD-545) was a Fletcher-class destroyer of the United States Navy. She was named for Captain Gamaliel Bradford (1768–1824), a privateer during the Quasi-War with France.

Bradford was launched 12 December 1942 by Bethlehem Shipbuilding, Terminal Island, Calif., sponsored by Mrs. Sarah Bradford Rose, great-great-granddaughter of Captain Bradford, and commissioned 12 June 1943.

== Service history ==
=== World War II ===
Bradford sailed for Pearl Harbor 18 August 1943. On 25 August, less than 24 hours after arrival in Pearl Harbor, she was underway for Baker Island to take part in its capture and occupation (1 September). Afterwards, Bradford joined the carrier striking forces to participate in the Tarawa raid (18 September) and the Wake Island raid (5–6 October).

She operated as a screening unit in Task Group 52.3 (TG 52.3), covering the occupation of the Gilbert Islands (13 November – 8 December). Following this operation she went to Espiritu Santo, New Hebrides, and was assigned to TG 37.2. With this group Bradford participated in three strikes (25 December 1943, 1 and 4 January 1944) against the shipping and harbor installations at Kavieng, New Ireland, during the Bismarck Archipelago operations. Between 29 January and 8 February she took part in the occupation of Kwajalein and Majuro Atolls, during the Marshall Islands campaign.

In the ensuing months Bradford participated in the Truk attack (17–18 February), during which she scored several torpedo and 5-inch gunfire hits on an enemy cruiser and destroyer, and the Marianas raids (21–22 February). She then supported

- the occupation of New Guinea as part of the Fast Carrier Task Force (then TF 58) (21 April – 1 June);
- the invasion of Saipan (11–24 June);
- 1st Bonins raid (15–16 June),
- Battle of the Philippine Sea (19–20 June),
- 2nd Bonins raid (24 June);
- 3rd Bonins raid (3–4 July);
- assault on Guam (12 July – 15 August);
- Palau-Yap-Ulithi raid (25–27 July);
- and 4th Bonins raid (4–5 August).

In September she returned to the United States for a complete overhaul.

Bradford steamed to Pearl Harbor in December 1944 and, after undergoing training as a fire support ship, took part in the assault on Iwo Jima (19–27 February 1945). In the Okinawa operation (24 March – 25 July) she supported the landing and occupation operations as a screening unit of TG 52.1 and as a radar picket ship. From 25 July to 10 August she participated In 3rd Fleet operations against Japan. She acted as a fire support and fighter director ship for the minesweeping operations in the East China Sea-Ryukyus area (10–25 August). After a number of transport missions in the Far East Bradford left for San Diego 31 October 1945 where she was placed out of commission in reserve 11 July 1946.

=== 1950–1961 ===
Bradford was recommissioned 27 October 1950 and reported to the Pacific fleet.

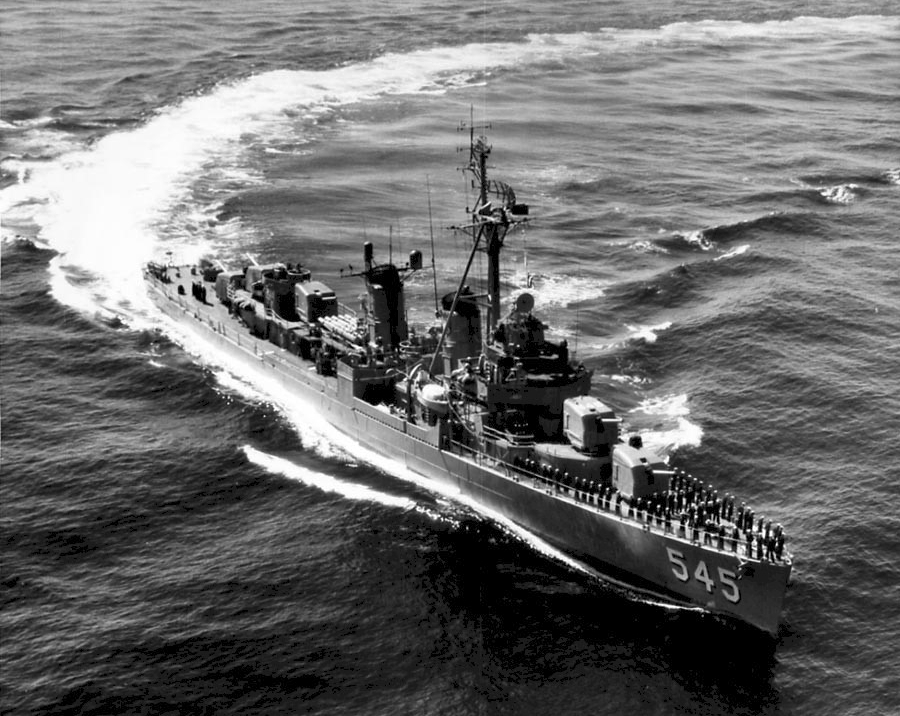
Bradford in 1961.

Between 29 January 1951 and 2 November 1953 she completed three Far Eastern tours (29 January–August 1951, 22 March–November 1952, and May–November 1953) during which she acted as a unit of TF 77 and TF 95 on duty off Korea. While on this duty she engaged in shore bombardment and patrolling in support of the United Nations ground forces.

She made three additional cruises to the Far East. Between these cruises she operated out of San Diego conducting extensive individual and type training exercises.

Bradford was decommissioned 28 September 1961.

=== Greek service ===
The ship was transferred to Greece 27 September 1962. She served in the Greek Navy as Thyella (D28) ("Storm"). She was stricken in 1981 and scrapped.

== Awards ==
Bradford received the Navy Unit Commendation for her services as a radar picket ship during the Okinawa operation. In addition, she received 12 battle stars for her World War II service and six battle stars for her participation in the Korean War.
