= Bradford Township, Pennsylvania =

Bradford Township is the name of some places in the U.S. state of Pennsylvania:

- Bradford Township, Clearfield County, Pennsylvania
- Bradford Township, McKean County, Pennsylvania

== See also ==
- East Bradford Township, Chester County, Pennsylvania
- West Bradford Township, Pennsylvania
