= James Bradford =

James Bradford may refer to:

- James Bradford (weightlifter) (1928–2013), American weightlifter and Olympic medalist
- James C. Bradford (1945–2024), American professor of history at Texas A&M University
- Jim Bradford (politician) (1933–2020), politician in South Dakota
- Jim Bradford (footballer) (1926–2005), Australian rules football player
- James W. Bradford (c. 1948–2023), American businessman and academic
- James Cowdon Bradford Sr. (1892–1981), American businessman

== See also ==
- Bradford (name)
