= David Bradford (photographer) =

Photographer

David Bradford is a New York street photographer and maker of videos. He became known in the 1990s when he combined his graphic skills with a job as a taxi driver. Since then he has published two books of his photographs.

== Life and career ==
Bradford was born in Flint, Michigan in 1951. As a teenager he enjoyed dance and playing the trombone. After graduating in illustration from the Rhode Island School of Design in 1978, Bradford moved to New York and worked for ten years for Saks Fifth Avenue. He then left Saks to work freelance, and from 1990 started to drive a taxi to supplement his income.

Bradford particularly enjoyed photographing in the rain and snow: "There is more drama when the umbrellas are out and people's faces are scrunched up."

At first, Bradford took photographs from the taxi as material for his illustrations; but from 1993 he was taking photographs for their own sake. His first book, Drive-By Shootings, sold 50,000 copies within months.

A review in The New York Times compared Bradford's photographs with those by the then mayor Rudy Giuliani, saying of Bradford's:

[H]e often includes a steering wheel, side mirror or windshield wipers, constant reminders of his relationship to the city. . . . [T]he windshield and side mirror frame what Mr. Bradford calls New York's "separate realities". . . . In Mr. Bradford's world, it's usually a dark and stormy night and you follow your nose or your hood ornament.

For The New York Taxi Back Seat Book (2006), Bradford pointed the camera backwards rather than outside.

Bradford later turned to making 15-second videos from the front seat of his taxi.

In 2014, Bradford was described as having retired from driving a taxi "a few years ago".

== Exhibitions ==
- New York City blasts, Jack Shainman Gallery, New York City, 17–22 December 2005.

== Books ==
- Drive-By Shootings. Photographs by David Bradford, text by Gerhard Waldherr. Cologne: Könemann, 2000. ISBN 3-8290-2891-1.
- The New York Taxi Back Seat Book. Photographs by David Bradford. New York: Daab, 2006. ISBN 978-3-937718-85-9.
