= Bradford (computer program) =

Bradford was a computer program written and sold in the 1980s by Aaron Contorer and his firm, Contorer Computing. It was one of the first programs sold using the shareware marketing model.

Available for both CP/M and MS-DOS operating systems, it greatly increased the quality of printing on a dot matrix printer and included a range of fonts.

Though popular for several years, Bradford, along with similar products, became obsolete as Windows 3.1 included much more powerful support for attractive printing.
