= John Bradford Fisher =

American plastic surgeon

- Born: 1953 (age 72–73)
- Known for: Liposuction
- Medical career
- Profession: Surgeon
- Institutions: National Naval Medical Center; National Institutes of Health; St. Luke's-Roosevelt Hospital Center
- Sub-specialties: Plastic surgery
- Research: Psychological effects of plastic surgery

John Bradford Fisher (born 1953) is an American plastic surgeon who pioneered suction fat removal, better known as liposuction.

== Liposuction ==
In 1981, Fisher and Dr. Bahman Teimouran described fat removal by suction through a cannula, a method that preserved skin attachments and differed from traditional skin resection.

== Career ==
In 1982, Fisher enlisted in for the United States Navy; in 1983, he became one of the youngest Chiefs of Department of Plastic Surgery at the National Naval Medical Center, and was appointed Assistant Professor of Surgery at the Uniformed Services University of the Health Sciences. Fisher also served as consultant in plastic and reconstructive surgery at the National Institutes of Health, and was head of the Cleft Lip and Palate Clinic and Melanoma Skin Cancer Clinic.

As a Clinical Fellow in Surgery at the Columbia University College of Physicians and Surgeons and St. Luke's-Roosevelt Hospital Center in New York City, Fisher co-authored one of the first textbook presentations on body image.
