= Gamaliel Bradford (biographer) =

American writer

Gamaliel Bradford VI
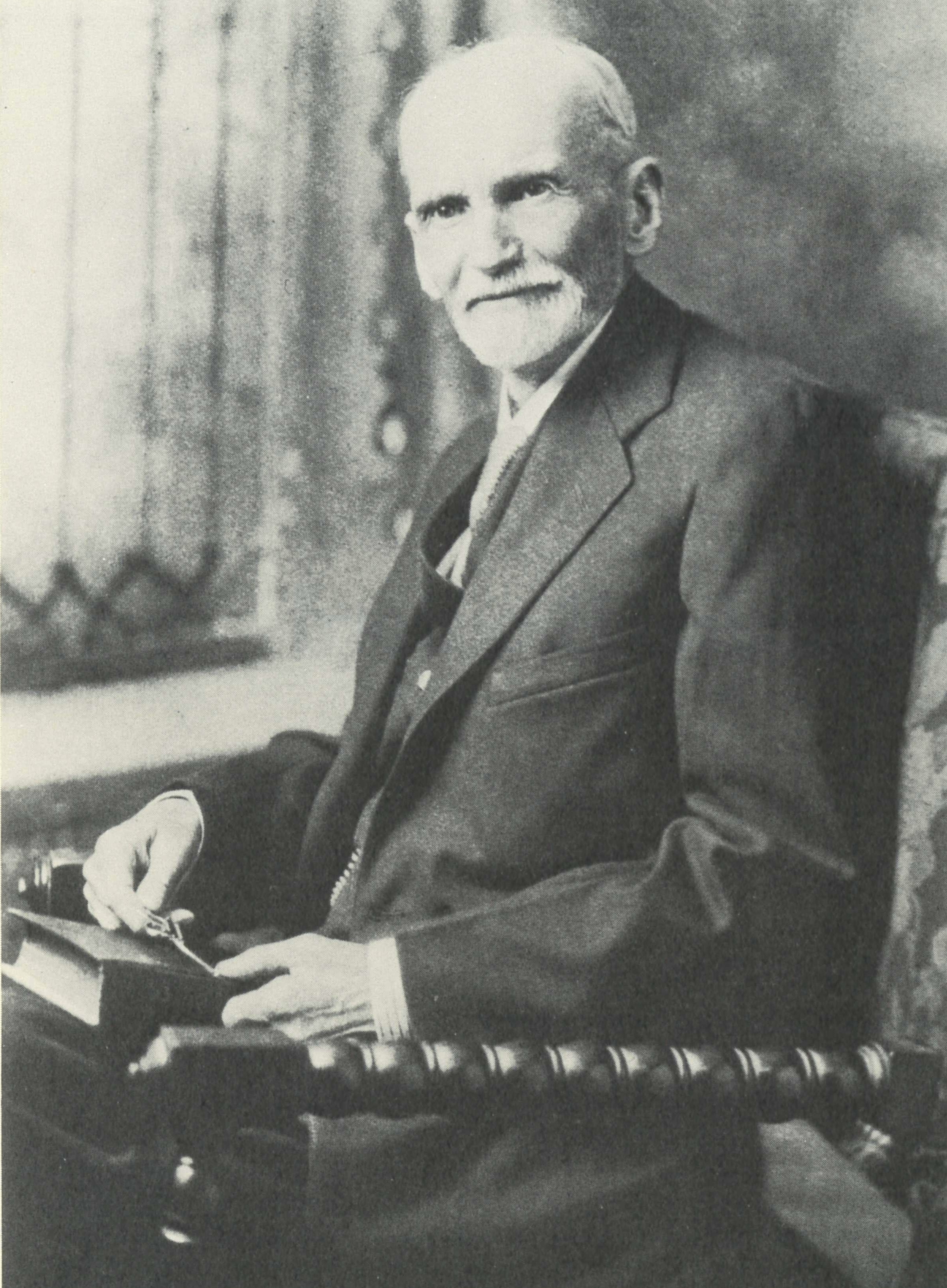
- Born: October 9, 1863; Boston, Massachusetts, US
- Died: April 11, 1932 (aged 68); Wellesley, Massachusetts, US
- Occupation: biographer
- Spouse: Helen Hubbard Ford
- Children: 2

Signature
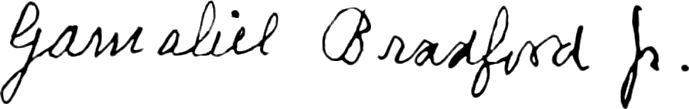

Gamaliel Bradford VI (October 9, 1863 – April 11, 1932) was an American biographer, critic, poet, and dramatist. He was born in Boston, Massachusetts, the sixth of seven men named Gamaliel Bradford in unbroken succession, of whom the first, Gamaliel Bradford, was a great-grandson of Governor William Bradford of Plymouth Colony. His grandfather, Dr. Gamaliel Bradford of Boston, was an early abolitionist.

Gamaliel Bradford VI was the son of Gamaliel Bradford V, a banker, writer, and reformer, and Clara Crowninshield Kinsman. His mother died of tuberculosis when he was three, and he was in part reared by his aunt, Sarah Hickling Bradford.

== Early life ==
Bradford enrolled at Harvard in 1882 but withdrew because of ill health. He continued his education privately but is said to have been educated "mainly by ill-health and a vagrant imagination." In 1886, he married Helen Hubbard Ford. It was an exceptionally happy marriage. Helen Bradford "not only took the best care of him in every domestic aspect; she also understood his work and had almost as great an interest in it as he did." The couple had two children. As an adult, Bradford lived in Wellesley, Massachusetts.

== Career ==
"Widely read in several languages and consumed by an almost Elizabethan passion for fame, Bradford attempted virtually every type of creative writing known in his time." Though he wrote poetry and novels, Bradford is best known for what he called "psychography", a style of life-writing developed by Lytton Strachey and typified by the earlier French critic Charles Augustin Sainte-Beuve. It featured biographies organized topically rather than chronologically with "emphasis not on the events of the subject's life but upon a description and analysis of the subject's character and personality."

Although Bradford wrote book-length studies of Robert E. Lee, Samuel Pepys, Charles Darwin, and D. L. Moody, his characteristic form was a shorter study of magazine-article length, collected and published as books, seven or eight to a volume. Confiding to his journal about his work on Moody, Bradford wrote, "I must try above all to enter into Moody's own state of mind and inner life, to see the world as he sees it and interpret it as he interprets it. But all that time, as always, there is and must be the play of my own spirit above and beyond all this."

== Personal life ==
When in 1930 a high-school girl wrote Bradford for information about himself for an assignment, he replied:

"I am fearfully old. I have blue eyes. I am an invalid most of the time and ill tempered all of the time. I like cats and dislike children. My house is full of books, but they are all old books, and I read the same over and over, and know nothing of all the nonsense that goes on in the world. I belong to the Victorian age, which you have heard your grandmother tell about, when people wore long hair and long skirts and retired instead of going to bed and mostly pretended to be better than they really were. Now they pretend to be worse, but I don't see that it makes very much difference, because it is all pretty much pretending anyway."

Though this reply is playful, Bradford was indeed both a political and cultural conservative who could be shy and self-absorbed even while being flattered and lionized. Bradford struggled with ill health throughout his life, and he was rarely able to write more than two hours a day. Noted for his kindliness, he "had an immense correspondence and a multitude of friends, including established writers like Robert Frost."

Temperamentally religious, Bradford believed Darwin—a good man "with largeness and sweetness of soul"—to be "The Destroyer" of faith, one who left God "no more than an amiable possibility" with the result that the popular acceptance of his doctrine was "devastating." Bradford was shrewd enough to realize that acceptance of Darwinism sounded the death knell of traditional Christianity, and he was unable to find any modernist version of religion that satisfied him.

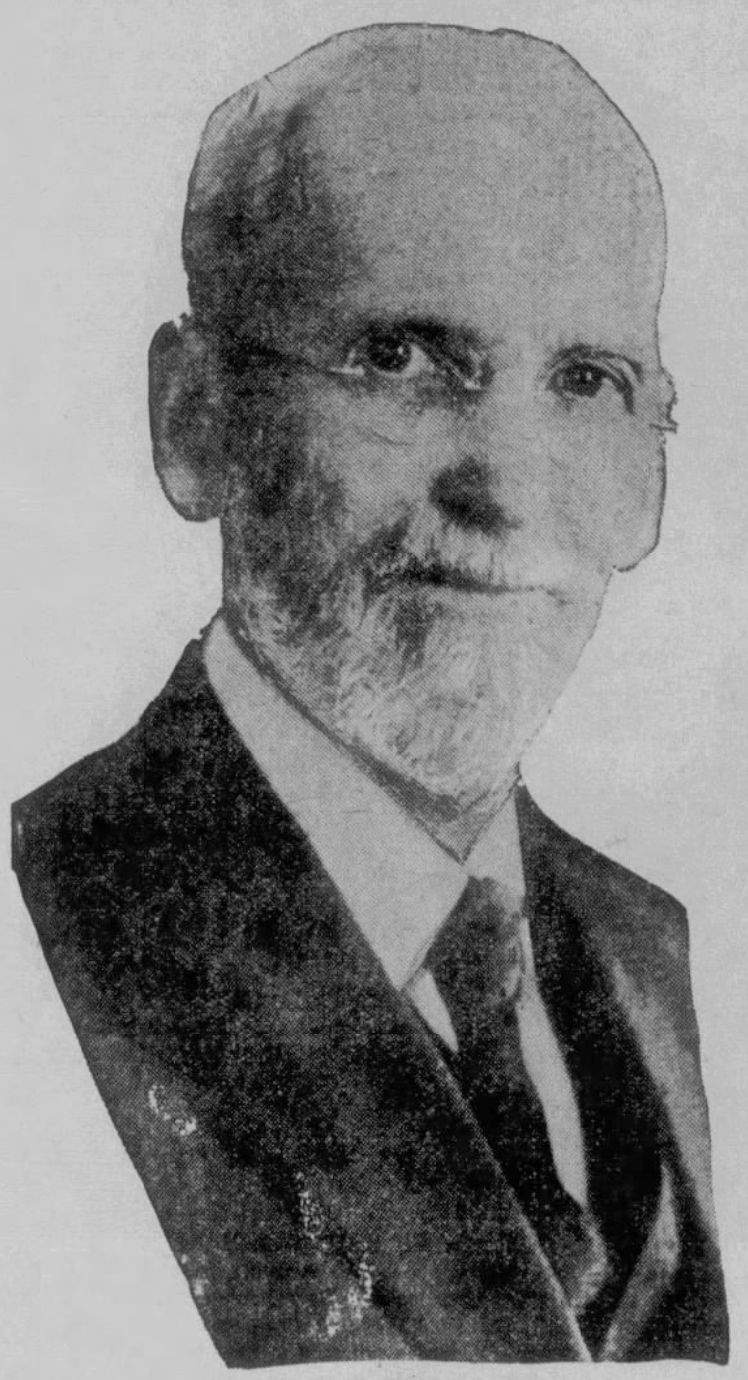
c. 1925

Bradford died on April 11, 1932, in Wellesley Hills, Massachusetts. His manuscripts, including his unpublished works, are in the Houghton Library, Harvard. Though he wrote an autobiography, it is no longer extant.

== Bibliography ==
- A Pageant of Life (poetry)
- A Prophet of Joy (poetry)
- Shadow Verses (poetry)
- Unmade in Heaven (drama), 1917.
- Lee, the American, 1912.
- American Portraits, 1875-1900
- Union Portraits, 1916.
- Confederate Portraits, 1914.
- Portraits of Women
- Portraits of American Women, 1919.
- Samuel Pepys 1924
- Wives, 1925.
- Darwin, 1926.
- The Quick and the Dead, 1931.
- Saints and Sinners, 1932.
- A Naturalist of Souls: Studies in Psychography (reprinted in part from various periodicals), 1917.
- Life and I (autobiography)
- Elizabethan Women, 1936.

=== Articles ===
- "Government in the United States," The Contemporary Review, Vol. XLVIII, July/December 1885.
- "Municipal Government," Scribners, October 1887.
- "A Hero's Conscience: A Study of Robert E. Lee," The Atlantic Monthly, Vol. CVI, December 1910, pp. 730–39.
- "Journalism and Permanence," The North American Review, August 1915.
- "A Confederate Pepys," The American Mercury, December 1925.
