= Charlotte Bradford =

Nurse during the American Civil War

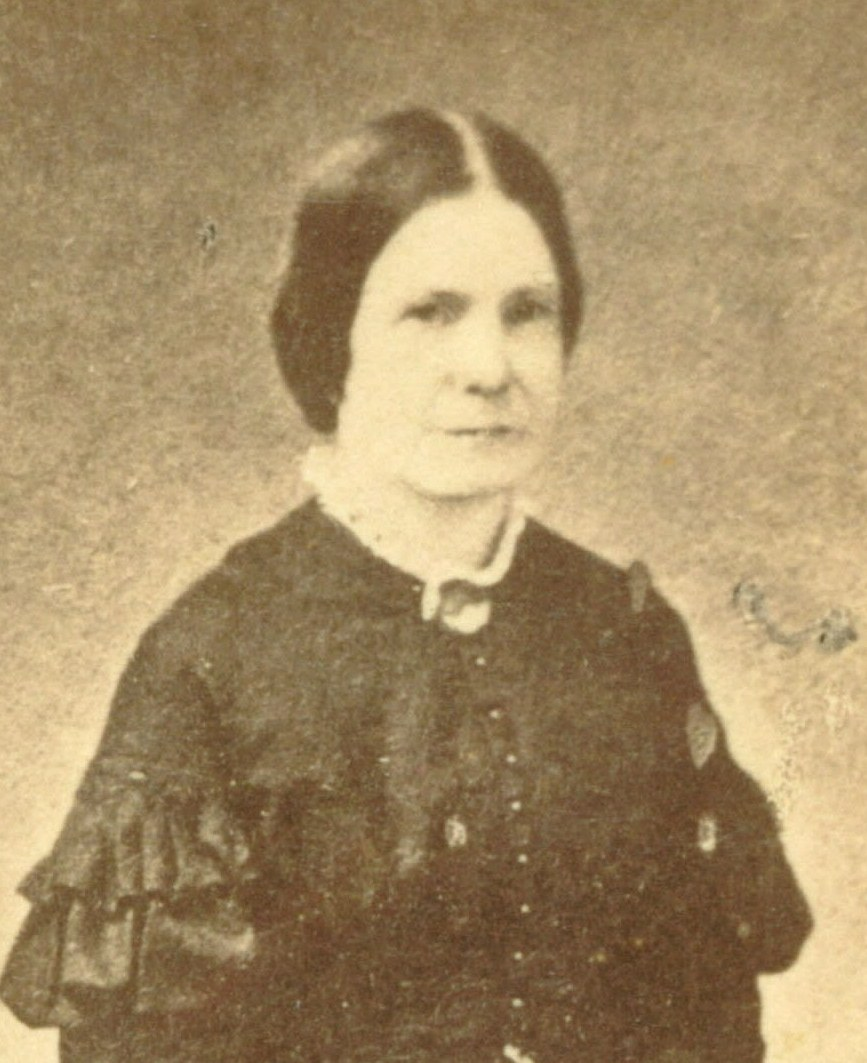
- Charlotte Bradford, 1862
- Born: June 20, 1813; Duxbury, Massachusetts, US
- Died: 1893; Duxbury, Massachusetts, U.S.
- Occupation(s): United States Sanitary Commission Nurse; U.S. Army Medical Department Nurse
- Parent(s): Gershom Bradford; Sarah Hickling

Charlotte Bradford (June 20, 1813 – 1893) was a nurse during the American Civil War and served as the matron of the U.S. Sanitary Commission's Soldier's Home and Home for Wives and Mothers in Washington, DC.

== Family ==
Charlotte Bradford was born in Duxbury, Massachusetts to Capt. Gershom Bradford and Sarah (Sally) Hickling Bradford. The home in which she was raised, The Bradford House, is today a house museum operated by the Duxbury Rural and Historical Society. It is located at 931 Tremont Street, Duxbury, MA.

== The Civil War ==
Bradford departed Boston, Massachusetts in May 1862 to become a nurse on board one of the hospital ships operated by the U.S. Sanitary Commission (USSC). The USSC's Hospital Transport Service was organized in April 1862 and maintained until the end of the Peninsula Campaign in August 1862.
