= Bradford, Iowa =

Bradford, Iowa may refer to the following places in Iowa:

- Bradford, Chickasaw County, Iowa, an unincorporated community
- Bradford, Franklin County, Iowa, a census-designated place
