= Gamaliel Bradford (abolitionist) =

American physician and abolitionist

- Born: November 17, 1795; Boston, Massachusetts
- Died: October 22, 1839; Boston, Massachusetts
- Education: Harvard University; University of Edinburgh
- Spouse: Sophia Rice
- Relatives: Gamaliel Bradford, father Sarah Bradford Ripley, sister Gamaliel Bradford, grandson

Gamaliel Bradford (1795–1839) was an American medical doctor, the superintendent of Massachusetts General Hospital, and an abolitionist.

== Early life and education ==
He was born in Boston on November 17, 1795, one of nine children of Captain Gamaliel Bradford and Elizabeth Hickling Bradford. At the age of 12 he spent nine months as a student in a Catholic seminary in Messina. He entered Harvard University in 1810 and was graduated in 1814. He was a member of Phi Beta Kappa society.

While studying medicine, he worked as a private tutor and as an assistant teacher at the Boston Latin School. His studies were interrupted in 1818 by a life-threatening bout of typhus. In 1819 he went to the University of Edinburgh to complete his education, returning in the spring of 1820.

== Career ==
From 1821 to 1827, Bradford practiced medicine in Boston and Cambridge, Massachusetts. In the mid-1820s he taught physiology. In 1827, he gave up practicing medicine and became the manager of a large South Boston brewery. He left the brewery in 1833, and a few months later was appointed Superintendent of Massachusetts General Hospital.

== Abolitionism ==
Bradford attended the founding meeting of the New England Anti-Slavery Society in 1832, but did not become a member. He was put off by William Lloyd Garrison's manner and thought his insistence on immediate emancipation was unrealistic. In 1835, however, when Boston's political leaders tried to pass legislation silencing Garrison and other local abolitionists, Bradford published an open letter in the Courier in which he defended the abolitionists' Constitutional rights to free speech and assembly. The letter was later reprinted as a pamphlet. He argued that the abolitionists had as much right to try to influence public opinion as supporters of the Temperance movement, and noted that Benjamin Franklin had signed an anti-slavery resolution in 1790.

Early in 1836, leaders of the Society met with state legislators to try to persuade them not to suppress their activities "by political fiat." Bradford joined Samuel Joseph May, Samuel Edmund Sewall, and Charles Follen, and made a speech in defense of abolitionism that was described in the Liberator as "eloquent, thrilling, and impassioned." Bradford argued that the abolitionists' activities were in keeping with international, constitutional, and moral law. In support of his third point, he cited Biblical law:

I come last to the moral law. The abolitionists, as we all do, Sir, look for the moral law in the Bible — they hold that the law and prophets hang from the precept "Thou shalt love thy neighbor as thyself." "But who," says their opposer, "is my neighbor?"

In answer to that question, Bradford then cited the Parable of the Good Samaritan.

The abolitionists won this particular battle, and in January 1837, the Massachusetts House of Representatives voted to allow the Anti-Slavery Society to use their hall.

== Personal life ==
Bradford was an advocate of temperance, pacifism, and strict Sabbatarianism. He was a mentor to Ralph Waldo Emerson. In his spare time he enjoyed writing essays and reviews, which were published widely in journals such as the Boston Spectator, the New England Journal, the New-England Magazine, the North American Review, and the Christian Examiner.

In March 1821, Bradford married Sophia Rice, daughter of Colonel Nathan Rice. He had a son, also named Gamaliel Bradford (1831-1911). He began having epileptic seizures in 1832. The attacks grew more frequent every year. In 1838 he embarked on a four-month Mediterranean cruise, hoping it would improve his health, but it had little effect. On October 22, 1839, at the age of 44, he had an unusually severe seizure and died.

From 1833 to 1839, Bradford kept a diary which contains many accounts of conversations with people such as John Quincy Adams, William Ellery Channing, Edward Everett, John Gorham Palfrey, Charles Russell Lowell, Sr., and Judge Lemuel Shaw. The four unpublished volumes are kept at the Houghton Library, Harvard University.
