= Nafe Katter =

American educator, actor, and director

- Born: October 25, 1927; Saginaw, Michigan, US
- Died: August 20, 2014 (aged 86); Summerfield, Florida, US
- Education: University of Michigan (BA, MA, PhD)
- Occupations: Educator, actor, director
- Employer: University of Connecticut

Nafe Edmund Katter (October 25, 1927 – August 20, 2014) was a stage actor and director who taught theatre at the University of Connecticut from 1957 to 1997. In 2000, Katter donated $1 million to build the 241-seat Nafe Katter Theatre, which opened in 2004 on UConn's campus in Storrs.

== Life and career ==
Born in Saginaw, Michigan, Katter was the son of a Lebanese baker, Nafe W. Katter, and Meta Blohm Katter. Katter planned to become a lawyer but discovered his true calling when he took a theatre class. He went on to earn his BA, MA, and PhD degrees from the University of Michigan. After a stint as an actor in New York City, Katter joined the University of Connecticut's faculty in 1957. He oversaw the university's acting program and directed one hundred productions, including Shakespearean plays and musicals. Katter retired in 1997 as professor emeritus of theater.

Katter acted for decades at the Hartford Stage, TheaterWorks, and other venues nationwide and continued acting after retirement. He was known for supporting roles in Shakespeare revivals and for regular performances as the Solicitor in the Hartford Stage's annual adaptation of A Christmas Carol. He co-founded a Shakespeare festival in Stratford, Connecticut, and spent ten years directing and acting in the Connecticut Repertory Theatre's Nutmeg Summer Series. He often collaborated with directors Michael Wilson and Mark Lamos.

== Legacy ==
In 2000, Katter donated $1 million to build the 12,000-square-foot, 241-seat Nafe Katter Theatre at UConn. The new theatre featured a thrust stage long needed by the university's performing arts programs. To raise money for the gift, Katter sold real estate, including a Florida condo and a London flat he had bought in the 1970s. The gift prompted UConn to invest $3.5 million to fund the rest of the construction. The Nafe Katter Theatre officially opened on October 7, 2004, with the Connecticut Repertory Theatre production of Shakespeare's Julius Caesar.

Katter made another gift of $400,000 in 2014 to the School of Fine Arts at UConn to fund the construction of a production facility behind the Katter Theatre.

In 1978, UConn had established the Nafe E. Katter/Ron Palillo Scholarship in Acting, honoring Katter and one of his students, actor Ron Palillo (BA 1972).

== Later life and death ==
Katter was a long-time resident of Manchester, Connecticut, before moving to Summerfield, Florida, in 2008. He suffered a stroke on August 7, 2014, and died at a Summerfield hospice facility on August 20 at the age of 86. Katter had never married and had no children. He was survived by his sister Elnora Katter Hamady, a niece, and two nephews.
