= Killing of Emantic Fitzgerald Bradford Jr. =

Black man fatally shot by law enforcement

Shooting of Emantic Bradford
- Date: November 22, 2018
- Time: 9:52 p.m. (CST)
- Location: Riverchase Galleria, Hoover, Alabama; 33.3805351°N 86.8098851°W
- Type: Homicide by shooting, police killing
- Cause: Gunshot wounds to the head, neck, and back
- Filmed by: Police body camera, mall surveillance, private videos
- Participants: David Alexander (shooter)
- Deaths: Emantic Fitzgerald Bradford Jr., aged 21
- Inquiries: Hoover Police Department (initial); Jefferson County Sheriff's Department; Alabama Law Enforcement Agency
- Coroner: Gregory Davis; Results of the initial autopsy have not been revealed.; Roger Mitchell; Independent autopsy found Bradford was hit three times from behind, with a fatal shot to the head.
- Charges: None

On November 22, 2018, Emantic Fitzgerald Bradford Jr., an African-American man, was shot three times from behind and killed by Hoover police officer David Alexander on the night of Thanksgiving, at the Riverchase Galleria shopping mall in Hoover, Alabama. Police responded to a shooting at the mall where two people were shot. Another African-American man suspected in the first shooting was arrested in Georgia a week later and charged in the shooting of one of those injured. Bradford was holding a legally owned weapon when shot and was not involved in the prior shooting incident, although near the crime scene. The shooting of Bradford was immediately controversial, and was condemned by the Alabama National Association for the Advancement of Colored People (NAACP) as an example of racially biased policing.

== Background ==
Emantic "EJ" Fitzgerald Bradford Jr., of Hueytown, Alabama, was 21 years old. He was born on June 18, 1997. He attended Holy Family Cristo Rey High School in Birmingham and earned his diploma through the General Educational Development (GED) program. Bradford had enlisted in the U.S. Army in 2017 and completed basic training, and was on leave in August 2018 before completing advanced individual training. Bradford worked full-time and was a caretaker for his father, a former correctional officer, with cancer.

== Incident ==
On November 22, 2018, at approximately 9:52 PM local time, an altercation involving four people occurred near the Footaction and JCPenney stores on the second level of the mall. One of the men – initially claimed to be Bradford and currently believed to be Erron Brown, who was later arrested by U.S. Marshals – reportedly drew a weapon and shot 18-year-old Brian Wilson twice, before fleeing the area. Stray gunfire also hit a 12-year-old female bystander. Within five seconds after Wilson was shot, two officers from the Hoover Police Department approached Bradford, who was armed. One of the officers immediately fired from behind at Bradford, who was running with gun in hand, and killed him.

It subsequently transpired that Bradford's movements in the critical seconds were more complicated than originally thought.

E.J. Bradford initially runs in the opposite direction (away from JC Penney),

creating a gap between himself and the gunshots. As he creates this gap, Bradford draws his

weapon and chambers a round. Bradford then charges back toward JC Penney, gun drawn.

— Report of Alabama Attorney General.

Brian Wilson and the injured 12-year-old were taken to different hospitals; Wilson in serious condition with two gunshots to the torso and the 12-year-old in stable condition with a lodged bullet near her spine. The mall was closed for the night. The 12-year-old was found to have had a rib fractured in the initial shooting, but her spine was undamaged. A 70-year-old woman had been injured by a fall while attempting to flee. She sustained multiple pelvic fractures, as well as internal bleeding and bleeding of the brain, and she was airlifted to Mobile.

== Investigation ==
The Hoover Police Department turned all video and other collected evidence to the Jefferson County Sheriff's Department, which subsequently turned the investigation over to the Alabama Law Enforcement Agency. All three agencies initially refused to release videos of the event.

During the investigation into the shooting, an additional gun was found in the "Santa's Village" portion of the Galleria. Doubt grew that Bradford was the initial shooter. In a press conference, Captain Rector of the Hoover Police Department stated that the initial shooter would need to be determined by the investigation into that shooting. Captain Rector also stated that they believe the initial altercation may have more people involved than originally suspected, and clarified that a separate investigation by the Hoover Police Department would occur for the police shooting. Late in the evening, the Hoover Police Department issued a correction saying that Bradford was not the shooter. They said the shooter was not in custody. Furthermore, the Alabama Law Enforcement Agency took over as lead investigator of the shootings.

A suspect in the initial shooting, Erron Martez Dequan Brown, was arrested by U.S. Marshals at a relative's home in Fairburn, Georgia, on November 29. He was charged with the attempted murder of Wilson.

On February 5, 2019, the Office of the Attorney General of Alabama released a report of its review of the evidence regarding the police shooting. They determined that David Alexander; "Officer 1", as he was referred to in the report, "identified E.J. Bradford as an immediate deadly threat to innocent civilians and thus shot Bradford to eliminate the threat," and therefore, that he, "did not commit a crime under Alabama law when he shot and killed E.J. Bradford and thus the Alabama Rules of Professional Conduct preclude presentation of this case to a grand jury." The report was strongly criticised by Bradford's family.

== Aftermath ==
The mall reopened the day after the shooting at 6 AM, and the two officers who were involved in the shooting were placed on administrative leave pending the investigation. When it was reported that the 21-year-old deceased victim was not the perpetrator, the family of the victim raised demands that the Hoover, Alabama Mayor and Police Chief step down.

Protests were organized by a Birmingham activist group called Justice League on the following Saturday. Protesters also called for a boycott of the Galleria.

On November 26, 2018, a protest gathered outside Hoover City Hall, calling for the Hoover Police Department to release video from the police body cameras and mall surveillance cameras for public review. The protestors then shut down U.S. Highway 31, carrying signs reading "Black Lives Matter", "Justice for EJ", and "Justice starts with the truth", as they marched to the Riverchase Galleria, the site of the shooting. Additional protests throughout the city of Hoover were organized in the following weeks in multiple shopping areas, public interstates, and private residences of Hoover City Officials, some resulting in the arrest of participants.

=== Family of Bradford ===
The family of Bradford hired civil rights attorney Benjamin Crump. Additionally, the Alabama chapter of the NAACP issued a press release condemning the "extreme and excessive police force." At a press conference in Birmingham, Benjamin Crump claimed that witnesses to both shootings described the responding officers as not revealing that they were undercover officers nor that they gave any orders to people nearby before shooting Bradford. He also stated that Bradford was trying to clear the area when the officers reached the scene of the initial shooting and that they prevented Bradford from receiving aid for a gunshot wound to the face. It was claimed that the gun on Bradford was not in his hands, but attached to his pants.

According to various members of Bradford's family, no one from the Hoover Police Department informed them of his death. In addition, they were not provided with any details of the police shooting until the November 28 meeting. One of Bradford's relatives called for the resignation of both Chief Derzis and Hoover Mayor Frank Brocato for their actions shortly after Bradford's death.

A meeting between the family of Bradford and Mayor Brocato, Chief Derzis, and Councilman Derrick Murphy occurred on November 28. The city leaders apologized to the Bradford family for the shooting and answered what questions they could regarding the events.

A vigil for Bradford was held on November 29 at the Kelly Ingram Park in Birmingham. A funeral for Bradford was set for December 1 at the Boutwell Memorial Auditorium with Reverend Jesse Jackson to speak.

A "preliminary anatomical review" was planned on November 29 for the following day to determine the number of shots that hit Bradford and whether Bradford was hit from the front or from behind. At a press conference on December 3, Crump was joined by attorneys Rodney Barganier and Frankie Lee in revealing the results of the independent autopsy. The review concluded that Bradford was shot three times from behind while he was running. The locations of the shots were to the right side of the head, the base of the neck, and the right portion of the hip. The bullets all entered from an upward angle and the shot to the head was the fatal shot, entering from the back right of the head and exiting above the left eye.

=== Hoover city ===
The Hoover City Council gave the ALEA until noon on December 3 to make a decision regarding the release of information pertaining to Bradford's shooting. Had the deadline passed without comment, Chief Derzis would have decided for the council if the information would have been released without the ALEA. Derzis revealed on the 3rd that the ALEA had asked city leaders to not reveal critical information while the investigation was in progress.

On December 6 it was revealed that the ALEA had had a meeting with Bradford's family, attorneys for the family, and district attorneys Danny Carr and Lyniece Washington. Part of the meeting allowed those present to view a portion of the footage of Bradford being shot. The meeting was allowed provided that specific evidence not be publicly shared or detailed. A Justice for E.J. Community Forum was held with members from the Nation of Islam and Black Lives Matter, among others, at the Muhammad Mosque in Birmingham.

The city additionally postponed a Christmas tree lighting ceremony that was to take place on November 29 due to threats that the lighting would be protested. A fourth protest occurred at the AMC Patton Creek movie theater on December 2.

=== Federal lawsuit ===
In 2019, Bradford's family filed a federal lawsuit against the officer who shot him (as a John Doe), the city of Hoover, the Galleria, and Brookfield Property Partners, the owners of the Galleria. In November 2020, the officer who shot Bradford was identified as David Alexander.

In April 2025 it was ruled that the city of Hoover and the owners of the Riverchase Galleria were not responsible for Bradford's death.
