= Dorothy Bradford (artist) =

British painter and printmaker (1918-2008)

- Born: Dorothy Bassano; 2 April 1918; Cockermouth, England
- Died: 17 June 2008 (aged 90)
- Education: Liverpool School of Art
- Known for: Painting

For the artist with a similar name see Dorothy Elizabeth Bradford.

Dorothy Bradford, née Bassano, (2 April 1918 – 17 June 2008) was a British painter and printmaker.

== Biography ==
Bradford was born in Cockermouth where her father was an art teacher. While still at school she took evening classes at the Liverpool School of Art. She continued to take evening classes when she left school and took a job in a department store to support her relatives when her father died. In 1940 she married Don Bradford, who worked for the Mersey Docks and Harbour Board and served overseas during World War II. In 1942 Dorothy Bradford took a job in London with the Council for the Encouragement of Music and the Arts, CEMA. Working in the art department of CEMA, Bradford helped organise art and design exhibitions. In wartime London she took evening classes at the Central School of Art including the life-classes taught by Raymond Coxon. She also took courses at Saint Martin's School of Art and later at Leeds College of Art. Working for CEMA gave Bradford the opportunity to attend many music and ballet performances and rehearsals, which were to become the main subject of her art.

After the war Bradford left CEMA and moved to Liverpool where she and her husband raised a family. Bradford continued to paint and built a reputation for depicting musicians in performance. She was the official artist attached to the 1971 tour of America by the New Philarmonia Orchestra and also for the Leeds International Piano Competition. She also spent periods recording the work of the Northern School of Music and at Sadler's Wells theatre. Bradford also lectured in art in the north of England and served as an art advisor to Ilkley Council. Bradford's work was shown at the Bluecoat Gallery in Liverpool, at the Woodstock Gallery, at the American Embassy in London and at the Royal Festival Hall, also in London. An exhibition of her work, Rhythms of Life, was held at the School of Music in Leeds during 2003.
