= Bradford Township =

Bradford Township may refer to:

- Bradford Township, Chickasaw County, Iowa
- Bradford Township, Clearfield County, Pennsylvania
- Bradford Township, Isanti County, Minnesota
- Bradford Township, Lee County, Illinois
- Bradford Township, McKean County, Pennsylvania
- Bradford Township, Wilkin County, Minnesota
