= Michael Bradford (academic) =

African American playwright

- Born: January 23, 1965 (age 61); Arkansas City, Kansas, US
- Education: University of Connecticut (BGS); Brooklyn College (MFA)
- Occupations: Playwright, professor
- Writing career
- Language: English
- Genre: Drama

Michael Bradford (born January 23, 1965) is an American playwright who is a professor at the University of Connecticut and former artistic director of the Connecticut Repertory Theatre. In 2021, the Connecticut chapter of the NAACP named Bradford one of the "100 Most Influential Blacks in the State of Connecticut."

== Biography ==
Born and raised in Arkansas City, Kansas, Bradford attended high school in Colorado and moved to San Jose, California, soon after graduation. He worked as a door-to-door encyclopedia salesman, a gas station attendant, a fast food worker, and other odd jobs while reading African American women poets and writing what he called "bad poetry." He served 10 years in the US Navy as a systems operator and became active in the community theater scene on naval bases. While stationed at the submarine base in Groton, Connecticut, Bradford took an early release buyout to reenter civilian life.

After exiting the navy, Bradford worked for Electric Boat and attended the University of Connecticut's Avery Point campus in Groton. He earned a Bachelor of General Studies from UConn in 1998 and an MFA from Brooklyn College in 2000, continuing to work odd jobs and teaching writing at Avery Point.

In 2001, Bradford became a professor at UConn. He served as head of the UConn Department of Dramatic Arts and as artistic director of the Connecticut Repertory Theatre from 2016 to 2020, when he transitioned to the role of UConn's vice provost for faculty, staff, and student development.

Bradford lives in New London, Connecticut. He is married with a family.

== Literary career ==
Bradford's plays, focusing predominantly on African American themes, have been performed nationally and internationally. His best known works include Living in the Wind (2000), which received ten AUDELCO nominations, and Olives and Blood (2012), a treatment of the murder of Federico García Lorca.

Bradford's works have been produced at The American Place Theatre, The Lark, Ensemble Studio Theatre, HERE Art Center, ETA Creative Arts Foundation, Playhouse on Park in West Hartford, Connecticut Repertory Theatre, ACT Theatre, Teatro Rita Montaner in Havana, and Brixton East Theatre in London. His workshops and readings include the Eugene O'Neill Theater Center, the Negro Ensemble Company, and Liminal Space Productions of London.

Bradford has received the Manhattan Theatre Club Fellowship, the Connecticut Office of the Arts Fellowship, The Lark Writers Residency, and the New York Stage and Film residency. To research and write his play Olives and Blood, he received a Research Scholar Fulbright fellowship to Granada in 2010–11.

== Publications ==
- Bradford, Michael (2005). Willy's Cut and Shine. New York: Broadway Play Publishing. ISBN 978-0-88145-269-3. OCLC 150646791.
- Bradford, Michael (2016). Olives and Blood, & Other Plays. New York: Dr. Cicero Plays. ISBN 9781945766039. OCLC 1015959368.
- Bradford, Michael (2017). Fathers and Sons. New York: Broadway Play Publishing. ISBN 978-0-88145-420-8. OCLC 1015959466.
