= Cornelia Bradford =

Cornelia Bradford may refer to:

- Cornelia Foster Bradford (1847–1935), American philanthropist and social reformer
- Cornelia Smith Bradford (died 1755), American printer and newspaper editor
