= Bradford (name) =

Bradford is a name of Old English origin. It particularly refers to those from the City of Bradford, West Yorkshire. Notable people and characters with the name include:

== Given name ==
- Bradford Anderson (born 1979), American actor
- Bradford Angier (1910–1997), American wilderness survivalist and author
- William Bradford Bishop (born 1936), known as Bradford Bishop, American former U.S. Foreign Service officer accused of killing his family
- Bradford P. Campbell, American government official
- Bradford Cox, American musician
- Bradford Delson, known as Brad Delson, guitarist with the rock band Linkin Park
- Bradford Dillman (1930–2018), American actor
- Bradford Gowen, American pianist
- Brad Lander (born Bradford Lander, 1969), American politician
- Bradford Shellhammer, American entrepreneur and designer
- Bradford A. Smith, American astronomer
- George Bradford Caird (1917–1984), British theologian and biblical scholar

== Surname ==
- Alexander Blackburn Bradford (1799–1873), Tennessee State Senator
- Chasen Bradford, American baseball player
- George W. Bradford (1796–1883), New York Senator
- James Bradford (disambiguation) or Jim Bradford, several people
- Jay Bradford (born 1940), insurance businessman and politician in Arkansas
- John Bradford (disambiguation), several people
- Mary Lythgoe Bradford (1930–2022), American writer
- Siôn Bradford (1706–1785), Welsh poet
- Stacey Bradford, American financial journalist, author, and commentator
- Stella Stevens Bradford (1871–1959), American medical doctor, pioneer in physical therapy
- Steven Bradford (born 1960), California State Senator
- Sue Bradford (born 1952), New Zealand activist, academic, and former politician
- William Bradford (disambiguation), several people

== Fictional characters ==
- the title character of Brick Bradford, a science fiction comic strip
- Bradford Meade, in the television series Ugly Betty
- Bradford Buzzard, the main antagonist of the television series DuckTales

== See also ==
- Bradford baronets
