= Joshua Taylor Bradford =

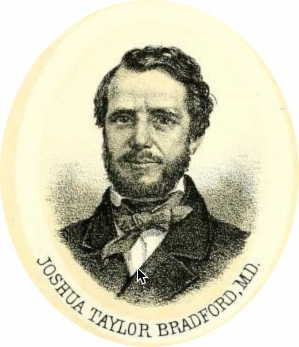

Joshua Taylor Bradford (December 9, 1818 – October 31, 1871) was an American surgeon and a pioneer of ovariotomy. At a time when ovariotomies were associated with great risk, he improved the success rates through asepsis and careful ligation of the pedicles, the ovarian branches of the uterine artery.

== Biography ==
Bradford was born in Bracken County, Kentucky to William and Elizabeth Johnson. After the death of his father in 1830 he worked as an apprentice to his older brother Jonathan Johnston Bradford, who had studied medicine from Transylvania University, Lexington. He then studied medicine at Augusta College and privately trained in anatomy under Professor Benjamin Winslow Dudley. He learned of the use of boiled water and cleanliness in surgery and became skilled in the removal of kidney stones. His thesis for the degree of medicine was titled "An inaugural dissertation on Asiatic Cholera" (1839).

Bradford then went to practice in Augusta. Bradford assisted Alexander Dunlap in Ripley, Ohio in a couple of cases of ovariotomy and fibroids in the uterus. The operation was performed by Philip J. Buckner who continued ovariotomies with mixed success. In 1852 he reported that 11 out of 16 had been successful with the remainder resulting in death from peritonitis or bleeding. Bradford continued to work with Dunlap and was able to perform seven ovariotomies, all successful, by 1856. In 1857 he reported that success would increase if the pedicle was carefully secured and ligated. By 1860 he had made twelve ovariotomies with only one failure.

He served in the American Civil War as a volunteer in the US Medical Corps in 1861 and was discharged in 1863. On September 27, 1862, Bradford led the efforts of the Augusta Home Guard to defend Augusta from Confederate raiders under by Col. Basil W. Duke.

Joshua Taylor Bradford died in 1871 in Augusta, Kentucky from an abscess of the liver.
