= John Spencer Purvis Bradford =

Archaeologist

John Spencer Purvis Bradford FSA, RAI (28 August 1918 - 12 August 1975) was an archaeologist and a pioneer in landscape archaeology and the use of aerial photography.

He was born in Ealing and studied at Christ Church, Oxford University. During the Second World War he was stationed at San Severo, Italy as part of the Mediterranean Allied Photographic Reconnaissance Wing, starting in January 1943 where he analysed photographs taken by the RAF. In 1947, he was appointed University Demonstrator and Lecturer in Ethnology at the Pitt Rivers Museum. He worked in various projects in Italy, Greece and Cyprus that revolved around aerial photography and land surveys.

== Publications ==
- Fieldwork on aerial discoveries in Attica and Rhodes. Part I. The town plan of Classical Rhodes. (1956)
- Fieldwork on aerial discoveries in Attica and Rhodes. Part II. Ancient field systems on Mt. Hymettos, near Athens (1956)
- Ancient landscapes: studies in field archaeology. London: G. Bell and Sons (1957)

== See also ==
- Aerial archaeology
