= Bill Bradford (footballer) =

English footballer (1903–1984)

Personal information
- Full name: John William Bradford
- Date of birth: 6 November 1903
- Place of birth: Peggs Green, England
- Date of death: 1984 (aged 80–81)
- Height: 5 ft 8 in (1.73 m)
- Position: Wing-half

Senior career*
Years	Team	Apps	(Gls)
1922–1923	Peggs Green Victoria		
1923–1924	Birmingham	0	(0)
1924–1925	Brighton & Hove Albion	3	(0)
1925–1926	Preston North End	1	(0)
1926–1938	Walsall	318	(21)
Total		322	(21)
- * Club domestic league appearances and goals

John William Bradford (6 November 1903 – 1984) was an English footballer who played in the Football League for Brighton & Hove Albion, Preston North End and Walsall.
