= Bill Bradford (pitcher) =

American baseball player (1921-2000)

- Pitcher
- Born: August 28, 1921; Choctaw, Arkansas, U.S.
- Died: August 22, 2000 (aged 78); Fairfield Bay, Arkansas, U.S.
- Batted: Right Threw: Right

MLB debut
- April 24, 1956, for the Kansas City Athletics

Last MLB appearance
- April 24, 1956, for the Kansas City Athletics

MLB statistics
- Win–loss record: 0–0
- Earned run average: 9.00
- Strikeouts: 0
- Stats at Baseball Reference

Teams
- Kansas City Athletics (1956)

William D. Bradford (August 28, 1921 – August 22, 2000) was an American relief pitcher in Major League Baseball who played in one game for the Kansas City Athletics during the 1956 season. Listed at 6 ft 2 in (1.88 m), 180 lb., Bradford batted and threw right-handed.

On April 24, 1956, Bradford debuted with the Athletics in the eight inning of a game against the Detroit Tigers. In two innings of work, he allowed two earned runs on two hits with a walk and no strikeouts, and never appeared in a major league game again.

== See also ==
- Cup of coffee
