= Bradford Gowen =

American musician

Bradford Gowen is an American musician who is an associate professor of piano at the University of Maryland. He was educated at the Eastman School of Music and won the 1978 John F. Kennedy Center-Rockefeller Foundation International Competition in the Performance of American Music. Gowen released his first recording, Exultation, in 1979. He taught at the University of Alabama before accepting a position at the University of Maryland in 1981, where he has taught since.
