= Gamaliel Bradford (privateersman) =

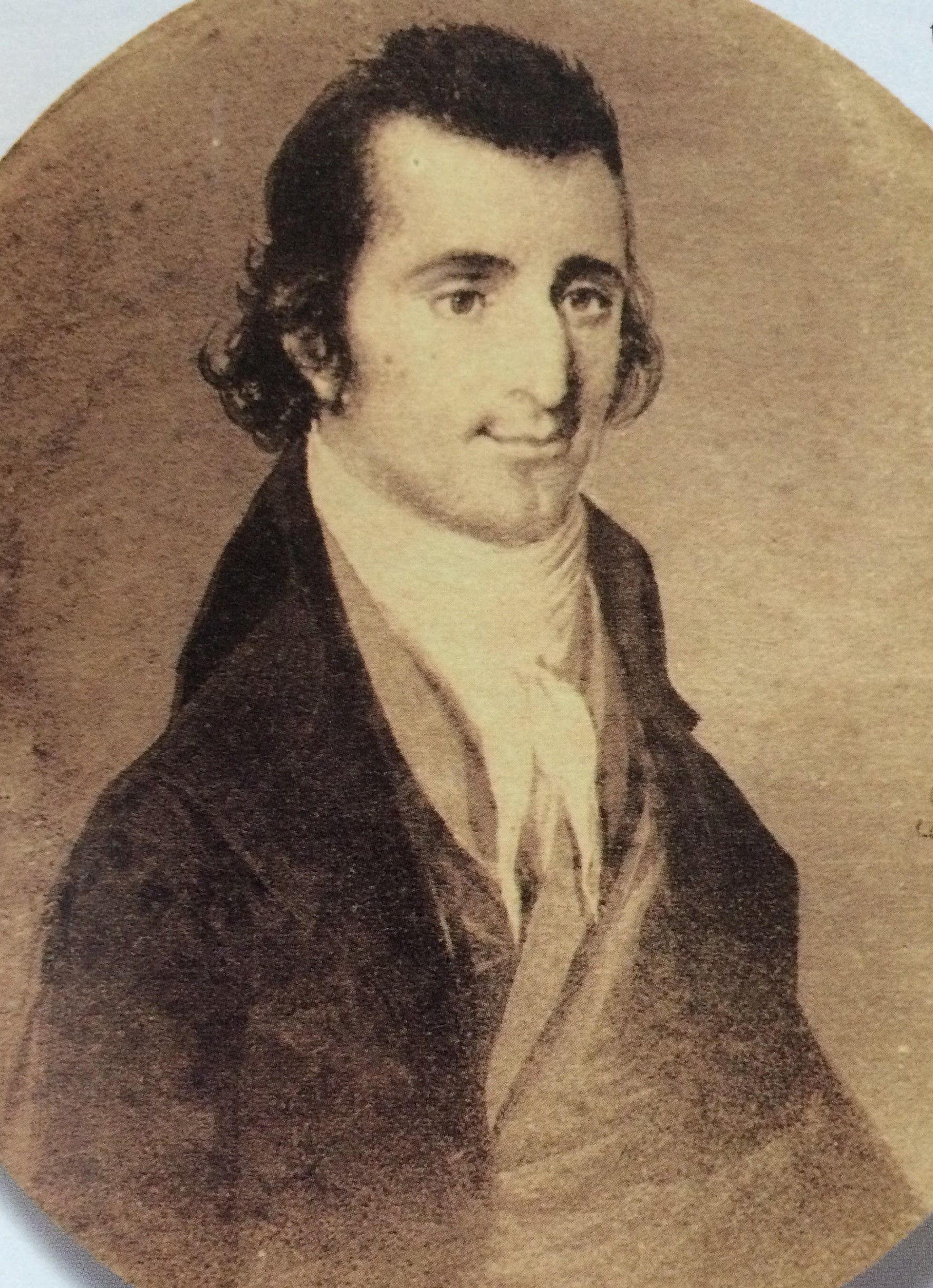
- Capt. Gamaliel Bradford
- Born: November 4, 1763; Duxbury, Massachusetts
- Died: March 7, 1824 (aged 60) Cambridge, Massachusetts
- Allegiance: United States of America
- Branch: Privateersman
- Rank: Captain
- Conflicts: Quasi-War
- Other work: Warden Charlestown State Prison

Captain Gamaliel Bradford (1763-1824) was a sea captain, privateersman, and later a prison warden who earned notoriety during the Quasi-War with France commanding two privately owned and armed merchant vessels known as letters of marque. Born November 4, 1763, in Duxbury, Massachusetts, he served in the 14th Massachusetts Regiment at a young age during the American Revolution, initially as a private and eventually was commissioned a lieutenant in the Continental Army. At the end of the war he went to sea as a mariner and by the 1790s commanded merchant vessels as a master mariner.

In 1799, he commanded the American ship Mary and successfully repulsed an attack by four French privateers off the coast of Gibraltar. In July 1800, in command of the Industry, he again routed four French privateers off the coast of Cadiz, Spain. During the latter engagement, Bradford was struck by grapeshot and the injury required the amputation of his leg. For his performance during these engagements, Bradford earned renown among the American merchant and naval fleets.

The injury prompted his retirement from seafaring. In 1813, he was appointed warden of the Massachusetts State Prison at Charlestown. He continued in that position until his death at his home in Cambridge, Massachusetts, on March 7, 1824. Bradford and his wife had nine children, many of whom accomplished notoriety in their fields. In 1942, the United States Navy named the USS Bradford (DD-545) after Capt. Gamaliel Bradford for his performance during the Quasi-War.

== Early life and family ==
Gamaliel Bradford, was born in Duxbury, Massachusetts, on November 4, 1763, to Gamaliel Bradford and Sarah (Alden) Bradford. His father was a captain of local militia prior to the Revolutionary War and served eight years as Duxbury's representative to the Massachusetts General Court.

He married Elizabeth Parker Hickling on August 5, 1792.

== Revolutionary War service ==
In 1776, his father was given the rank of colonel and command of the 14th Massachusetts Regiment. The younger Gamaliel Bradford at first enlisted as a private with the 10th Massachusetts Regiment but soon joined his father's 14th regiment. He fought at the battles of Saratoga and Monmouth before encamping with the army for its final cantonment at New Windsor, New York. After Monmouth, he was promoted to Sergeant on June 28, 1778, followed by promotions to Ensign (8/8/1779) and Lieutenant (9/3/1780). When the number of Massachusetts regiments was reduced in 1781, Gamaliel and the other men of the 14th were folded into the 7th Massachusetts Regiment. He stayed on another year in the army before finally returning home in 1784.

== Quasi-War ==
After the war, he commanded the American private armed ship Mary in 1799, during the Quasi-War with France. In July 1800, in command of Industry, he routed four French privateers at Gibraltar, though he sustained an injury that would cost him his leg. Captain Bradford died at Cambridge, Massachusetts, 7 March 1824.

== Legacy ==
His son and namesake, Gamaliel Bradford, became a physician and early abolitionist.

In 1943, the destroyer USS Bradford (DD-545) was named in his honor.
