= Dorothy Elizabeth Bradford =

British painter and etcher (1897-1986)

- Born: 1897; Cambridge, England
- Died: 1986 (aged 88–89)
- Known for: Painting, etching

Dorothy Elizabeth Bradford (1897–1986) was a British painter and etcher.

== Biography ==
Bradford was born in Cambridge. She was educated at The Perse School in Cambridge and at the Saint Felix School in Southwold. Bradford attended the Slade School of Fine Art in London where she won prizes for portrait painting and figure composition. She worked in oils, pencil and watercolours to depict a variety of subjects. Bradford exhibited on a regular basis at the Royal Academy in London from 1921 to 1950. She also exhibited with the New English Art Club and at the Royal Glasgow Institute in the early 1950s. Works by Bradford were exhibited abroad in Canada, New Zealand and in New York and Vienna. She was elected a member of the Society of Graphic Art.
