= Bob Crowell =

American attorney and politician (1945-2020)

Robert L. Crowell
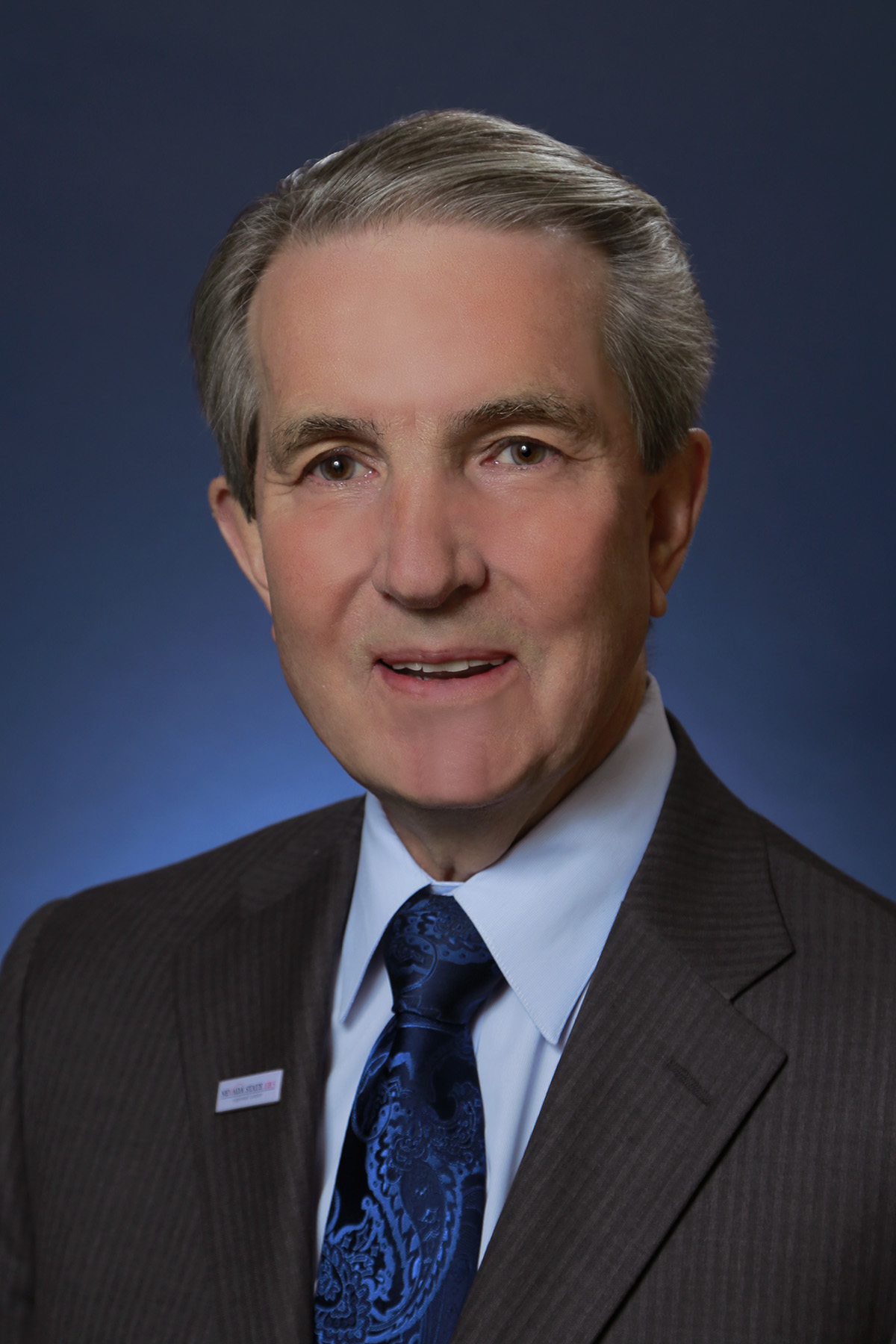
- Crowell in 2008

Mayor of Carson City
- In office January 5, 2009 – September 12, 2020
- Preceded by: Marv Teixeira
- Succeeded by: Lori Bagwell

Personal details
- Born: Robert Lamson Crowell; November 28, 1945; Tonopah, Nevada, U.S.
- Died: September 12, 2020 (aged 74); Reno, Nevada, U.S.
- Political party: Democratic
- Spouse: Susan Crowell (m. 1971)
- Children: 4, including Bradley Crowell
- Education: Stanford University (BA); University of California, Hastings (JD)

Military service
- Branch/service: United States Navy
- Battles/wars: Vietnam War

Robert Lamson Crowell (November 28, 1945 – September 12, 2020) was an American attorney and politician who served as the mayor of Carson City, Nevada, from 2009 to 2020. He was a member of the Democratic Party.

== Early life and education ==
Crowell was born in Tonopah, Nevada. He earned a Bachelor of Arts degree from Stanford University in 1967 and a Juris Doctor from the Hastings College of the Law in 1973.

== Career ==
Crowell served in the Vietnam War before retiring from the United States Navy as a captain.

He was elected as mayor of Carson City in 2008 and assumed office in January 2009. he ran unopposed in the 2012 election, guaranteeing his second, four-year term. Under Nevada state law, uncontested elections are not included on the ballot. Crowell also served as a member of the Colorado River Commission of Nevada.

== Personal life ==
Crowell had four children and two grandchildren. Crowell's son Bradley Crowell, is a political advisor and government official. Bob Crowell died at a VA hospital in Reno, Nevada, on September 12, 2020, at age 74.

== See also ==
- List of mayors of Carson City, Nevada
