= Jeff Baran =

American attorney and NRC member

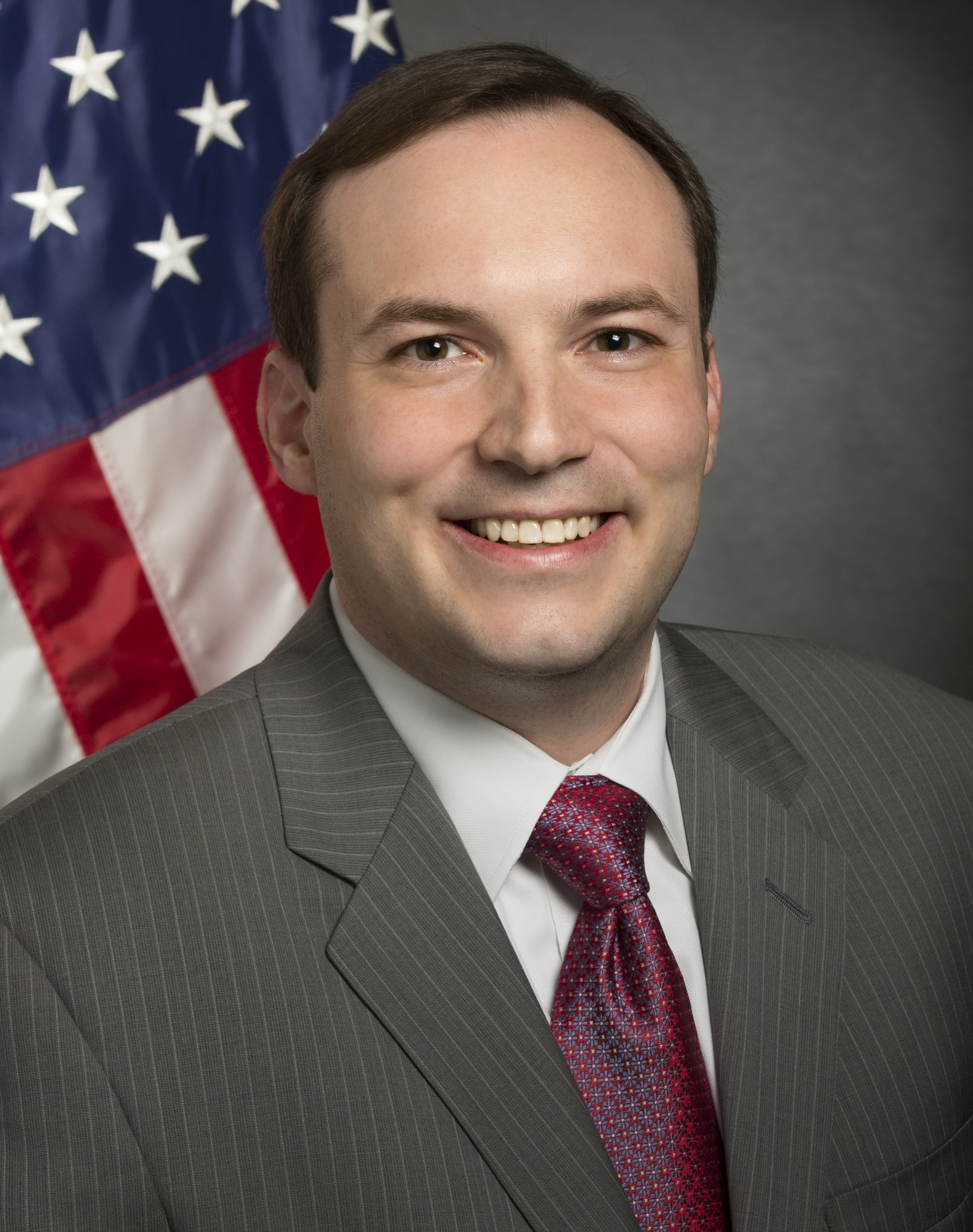

Member of the Nuclear Regulatory Commission
- In office October 14, 2014 – June 30, 2023
- President: Barack Obama; Donald Trump; Joe Biden
- Preceded by: William Magwood (seat 1); Allison Macfarlane (seat 2)
- Succeeded by: David A. Wright (seat 1); Matthew Marzano (seat 2)

Personal details
- Political party: Democratic
- Education: Ohio University; Harvard Law School

Jeff Baran is an American attorney who served as a member of the Nuclear Regulatory Commission (NRC) starting on October 14, 2014. He was counsel to the House Oversight and Government Reform Committee from 2003 until 2008. In September 2017, he was renominated by President Donald Trump to another five-year term on the NRC. Prior to joining the NRC, Baran served on the staff of the United States House Committee on Oversight and Government Reform and was senior counsel to the United States House Committee on Energy and Commerce, advising ranking member Henry Waxman.

Baran was renominated for a new five-year term by President Joe Biden in April 2023. While his renomination was pending in the Senate, his pre-existing term ended on June 30, 2023. In January 2024 it was reported that his nomination would not be resubmitted due to bipartisan opposition in the Senate.
