= David A. Wright =

American politician

David Austin Wright
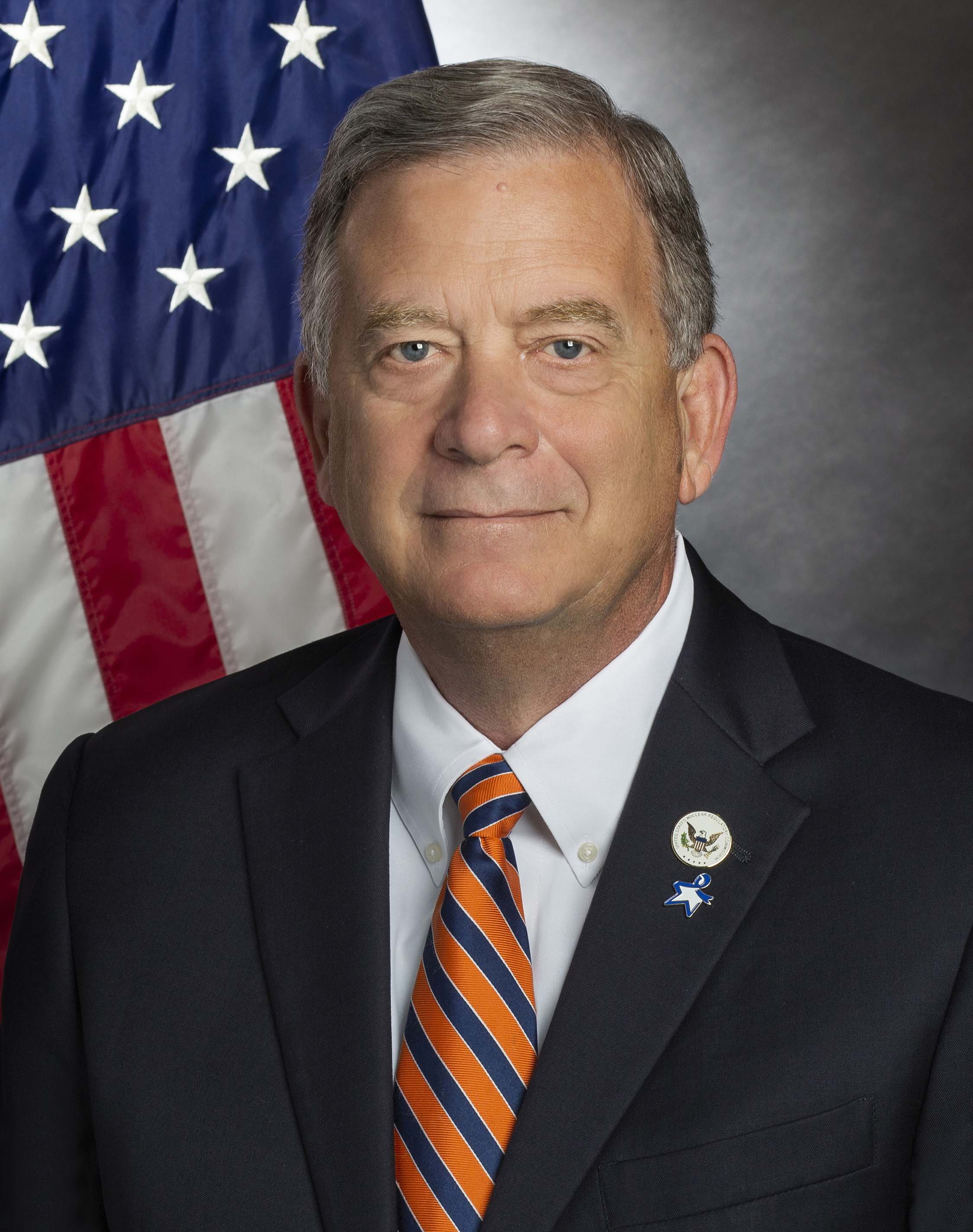
- Official portrait, 2023

19th Chair of the Nuclear Regulatory Commission
- In office August 1, 2025 – January 8, 2026
- President: Donald Trump
- Preceded by: himself
- Succeeded by: Ho Nieh
- In office January 20, 2025 – June 30, 2025
- President: Donald Trump
- Preceded by: Christopher T. Hanson
- Succeeded by: himself

Member of the Nuclear Regulatory Commission
- Incumbent
- Assumed office August 1, 2025
- President: Donald Trump
- Preceded by: himself
- In office May 30, 2018 – June 30, 2025
- President: Donald Trump; Joe Biden; Donald Trump
- Preceded by: Jeff Baran
- Succeeded by: himself

Personal details
- Born: Irmo, South Carolina
- Party: Republican
- Education: Clemson University (BA)
- Awards: Order of the Palmetto

David Austin Wright is an American businessman, politician, and energy policy advisor, and member of the Nuclear Regulatory Commission for the remainder of a five-year term expiring on June 30, 2025 after being nominated by President Donald Trump in May 2017 and again in January 2020 and confirmed by the United States Senate. President Trump designated him as Chairman of the NRC on January 20, 2025 until June 30, 2025. He was designated again from July 31, 2025 to January 8, 2026.

== Education ==
Wright was born in Charlotte, North Carolina. He graduated from Irmo High School in 1973. In 1977, he graduated from Clemson University, where he received a B.A. in political science and communications and was a member of the cross country team.

== Career ==
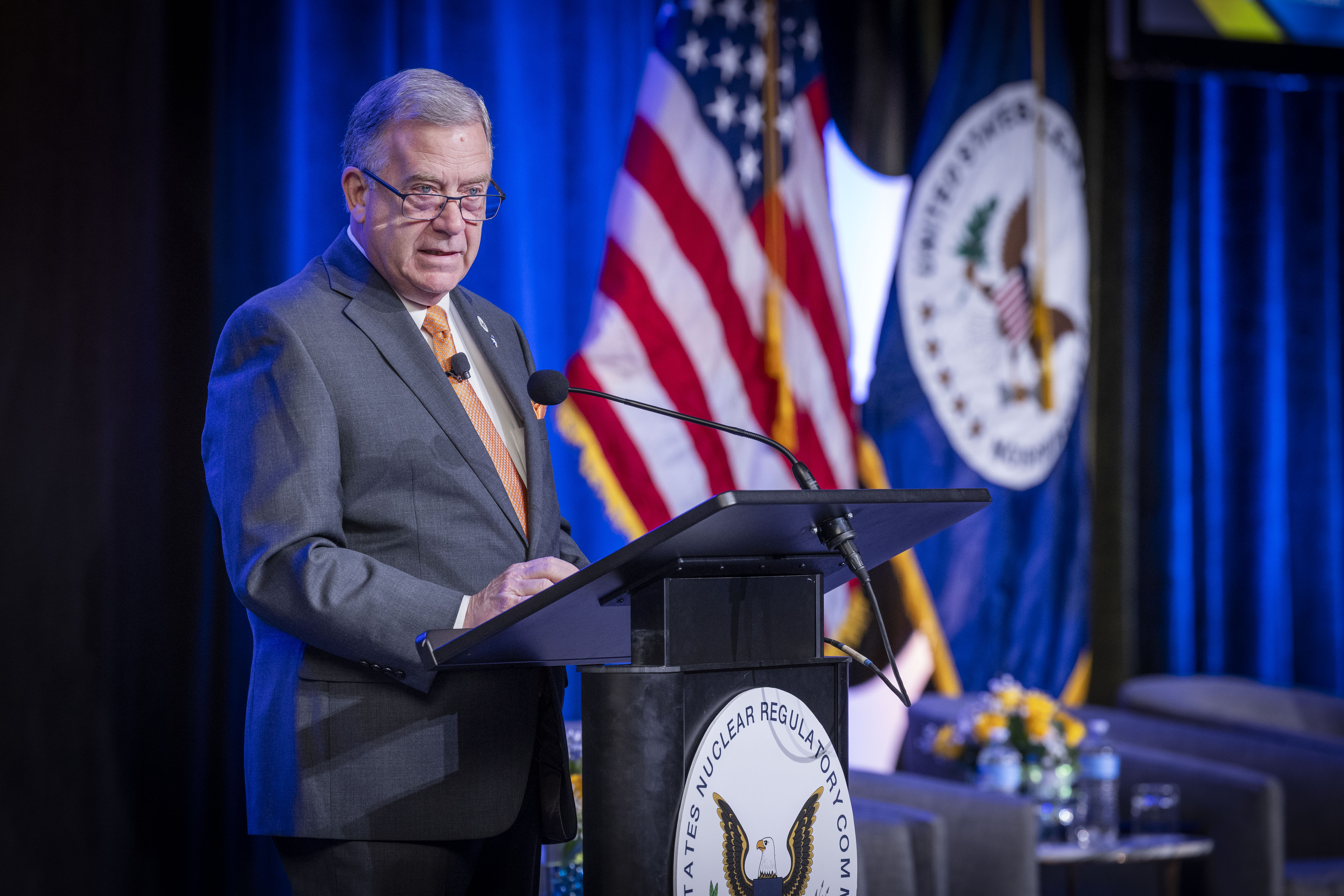
Wright delivering remarks at the 2025 Nuclear Regulatory Commission Regulatory Information Conference

Wright served on the Irmo Town Council from 1983 to 1985 and was mayor of Irmo from 1985 to 1988. From 1988 to 1996, he served in the South Carolina House of Representatives, representing District 85. Wright was elected to the South Carolina Public Service Commission in March 2004, serving until June 2013. He chaired the commission beginning in July 2012. In 2011, he was elected president of the National Association of Regulatory Utility Commissioners. Wright is also the former president of the Southeastern Association of Regulatory Utility Commissioners, the former chairman of the Nuclear Waste Strategy Coalition, and a former member of the advisory board of the Electric Power Research Institute.

Wright is the owner of Wright Directions LLC, a strategic consulting and communications business. He has owned and operated a number of retail, commercial, and professional services businesses. Wright also has a real estate license and is a licensed auctioneer in South Carolina.

== Personal life ==
Wright is a colon cancer survivor. He has four children. In 1996, he received South Carolina's highest citizen honor, the Order of the Palmetto. In 2017, the Charlotte Business Journal named Wright its Lifetime Achievement winner in its annual Energy Leadership awards.
