= Nuclear Regulatory Commission =

US Government agency for nuclear regulation & radiation safety

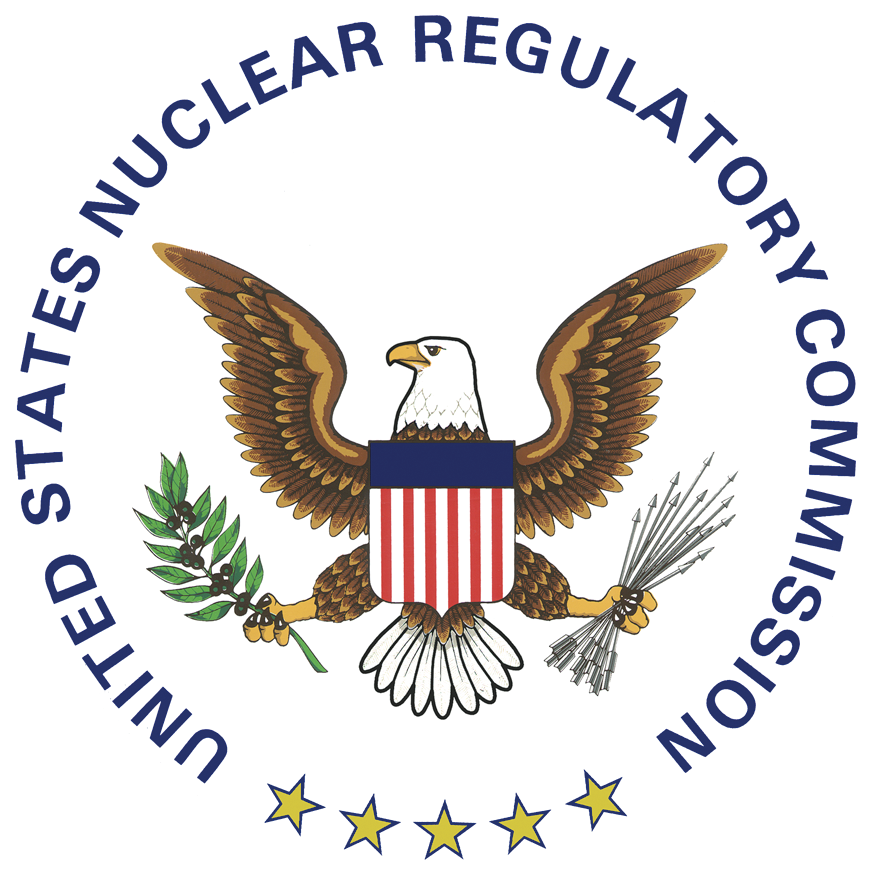

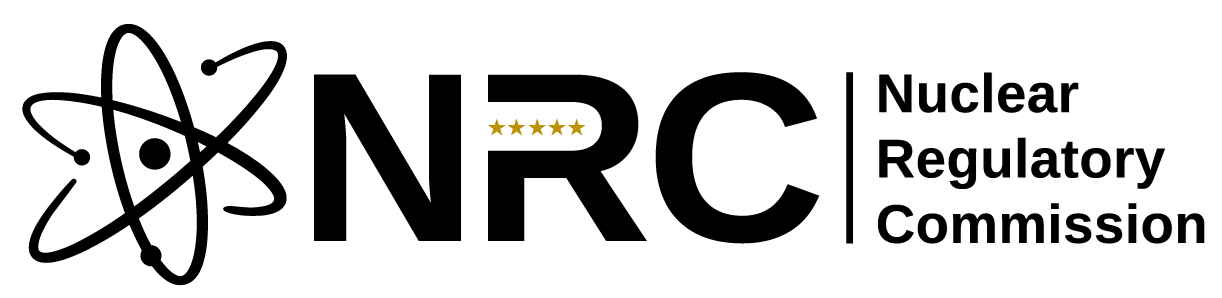

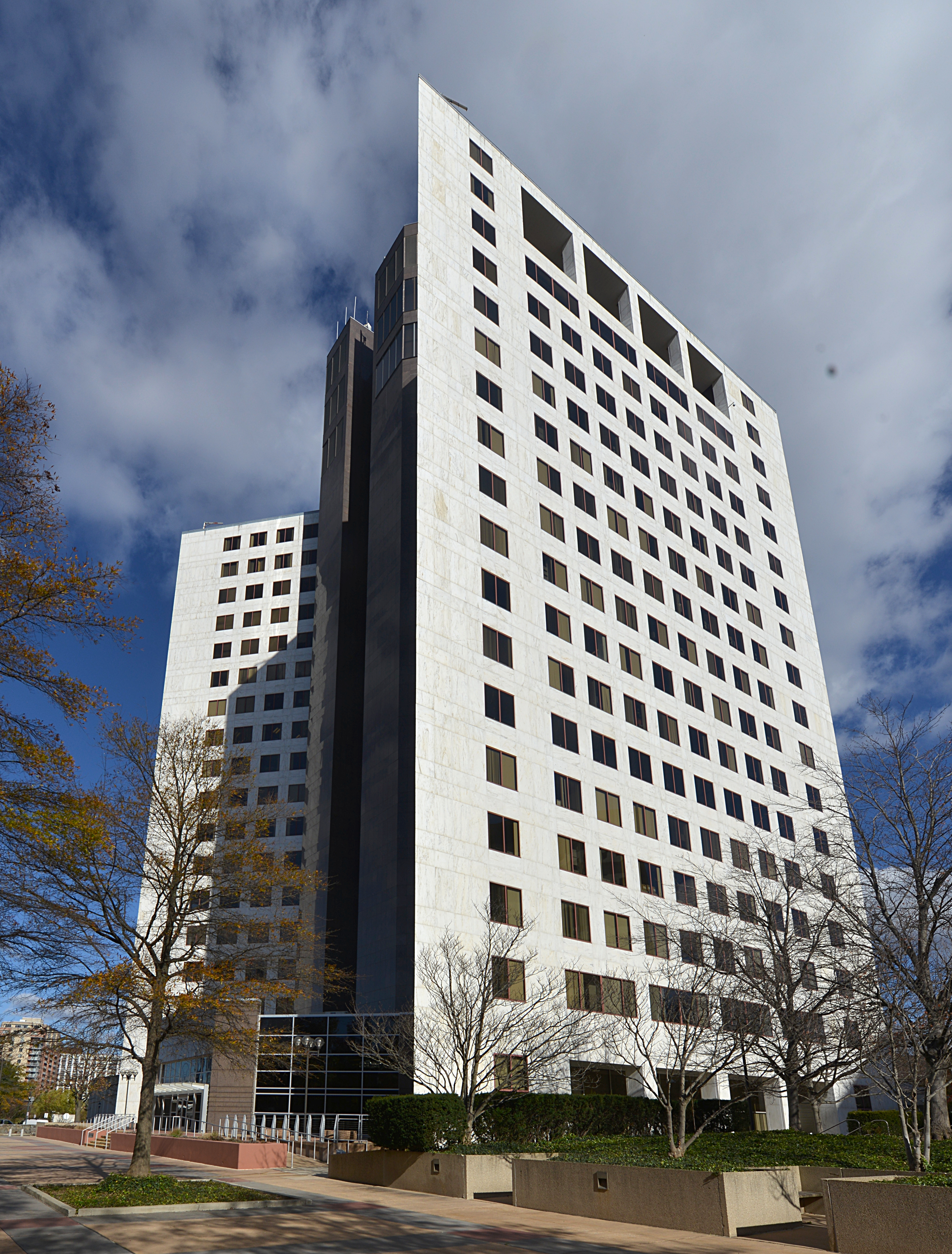

Agency overview
- Formed: January 19, 1975; 51 years ago
- Preceding agency: Atomic Energy Commission
- Headquarters: North Bethesda, Maryland
- Employees: 2,868 (2021)
- Annual budget: $879 million (2021)
- Agency executive: Ho Nieh, Chairman
- Key document: Energy Reorganization Act of 1974
- Website: nrc.gov

The United States Nuclear Regulatory Commission (NRC) is an agency of the United States government tasked with protecting public health and safety related to nuclear energy. Established by the Energy Reorganization Act of 1974, the NRC began operations on January 19, 1975, as one of two successor agencies to the United States Atomic Energy Commission. Its functions include overseeing reactor safety and security, administering reactor licensing and renewal, licensing and oversight for fuel cycle facilities, licensing radioactive materials, radionuclide safety, and managing the storage, security, recycling, and disposal of spent fuel.

== History ==
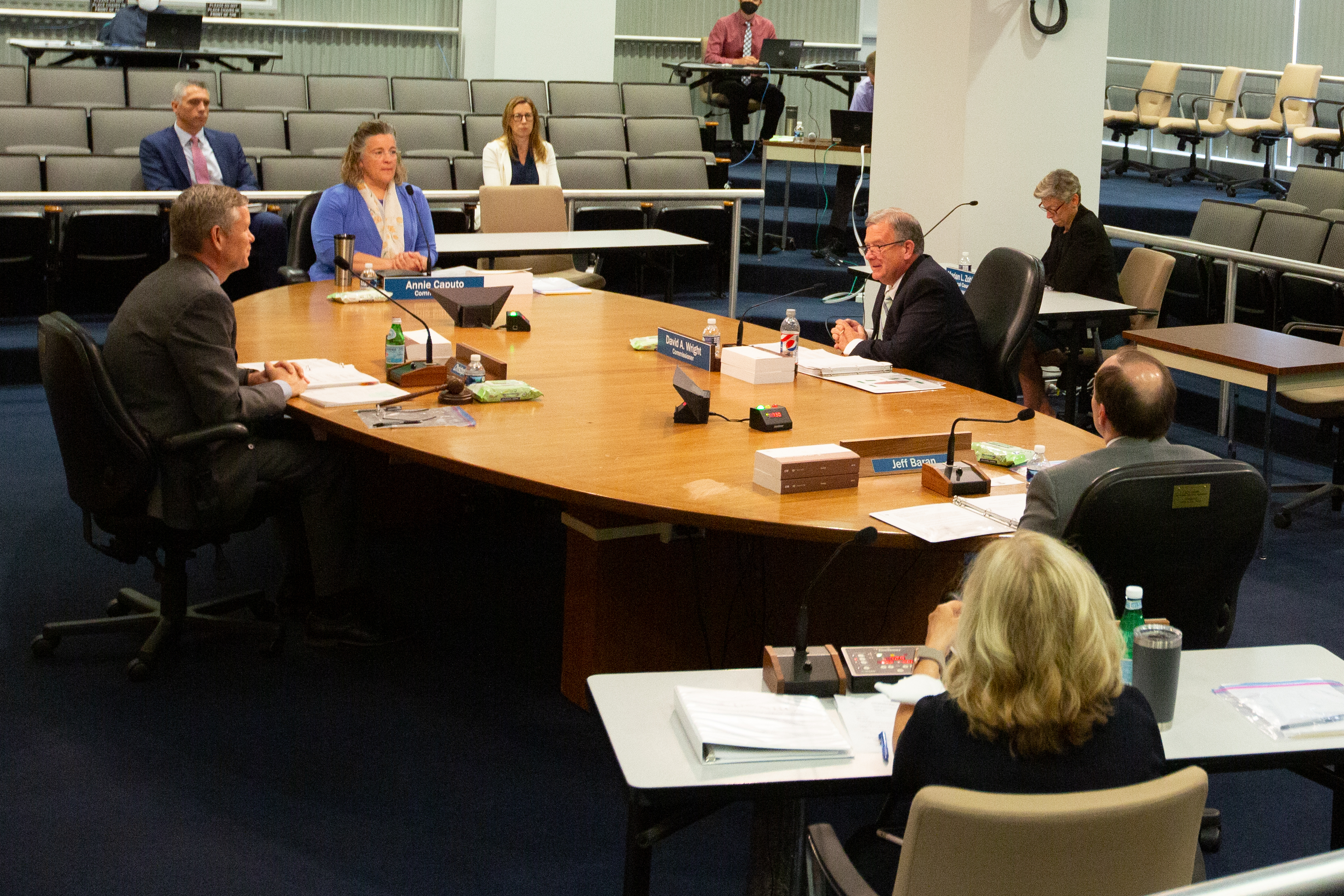
The commission meets in 2021

Prior to 1975 the Atomic Energy Commission was in charge of matters regarding radionuclides. The AEC was dissolved, because it was perceived as unduly favoring the industry it was charged with regulating. The NRC was formed as an independent commission to oversee nuclear energy matters, oversight of nuclear medicine, and nuclear safety and security.

The U.S. AEC became the Energy Research and Development Administration (ERDA) in 1975, responsible for development and oversight of nuclear weapons. Research and promotion of civil uses of radioactive materials, such as for nuclear non-destructive testing, nuclear medicine, and nuclear power, was split into the Office of Nuclear Energy, Science & Technology within ERDA by the same act. In 1977, ERDA became the United States Department of Energy (DOE). In 2000, the National Nuclear Security Administration was created as a subcomponent of DOE, responsible for nuclear weapons.

Following the Fukushima nuclear disaster in 2011, the NRC developed a guidance strategy known as "Diverse and Flexible Coping Strategies (FLEX)" which requires licensee nuclear power plants to account for beyond-design-basis external events (seismic, flooding, high-winds, etc.) that are most impactful to reactor safety through loss of power and loss of ultimate heat sink. FLEX Strategies have been implemented at all operating nuclear power plants in the United States.

The origins and development of NRC regulatory processes and policies are explained in five volumes of history published by the University of California Press. These are:

- Controlling the Atom: The Beginnings of Nuclear Regulation 1946–1962 (1984).
- Containing the Atom: Nuclear Regulation in a Changing Environment, 1963–1971 (1992).
- Permissible Dose: A History of Radiation Protection in the Twentieth Century (2000)
- Three Mile Island: A Nuclear Crisis in Historical Perspective (2004)
- The Road to Yucca Mountain: The Development of Radioactive Waste Policy in the United States (2009).

The NRC has produced a booklet, A Short History of Nuclear Regulation 1946–2009, which outlines key issues in NRC history. Thomas Wellock, a former academic, is the NRC historian. Before joining the NRC, Wellock wrote Critical Masses: Opposition to Nuclear Power in California, 1958–1978.

=== Executive Order 14300 ===
Executive Order 14300, titled Ordering the Reform of the Nuclear Regulatory Commission, is an executive order signed by President Donald Trump on May 23, 2025 that directs the Nuclear Regulatory Commission to reduce regulatory requirements and issue decisions on new reactor licences within 18 months. The order directed the NRC to reorganise its structure and establish updated regulatory frameworks. It required the introduction of fixed timelines for licensing decisions, including deadlines for new reactor applications and continued operation of existing reactors. The order called for a "wholesale revision" of the agency’s safety regulations and included reconsidering some radiation safety standards. The executive orders directed the commission to establish a process for high-volume licensing of microreactors and modular reactors, including allowing for standardised applications.

Following its signing, the NRC launched in February 2026 a reorganisation to streamline decision making, and to provide more efficient licensing and deployment of nuclear technology. The NRC had already issued internal guidance to staff for faster approval of reactor designs that have been tested under Department of Energy or Department of Defense programmes.

== Mission and commissioners ==
The NRC protects public health and safety and advances the nation's common defense and security by enabling the safe and secure use and deployment of civilian nuclear energy technologies and radioactive materials through efficient and reliable licensing, oversight, and regulation for the benefit of society and the environment. The NRC's regulatory mission covers three main areas:

- Reactors – Commercial reactors for generating electric power and research and test reactors used for research, testing, and training
- Materials – Uses of nuclear materials in medical, industrial, and academic settings and facilities that produce nuclear fuel
- Waste – Transportation, storage, and disposal of nuclear materials and waste, and decommissioning of nuclear facilities from service.

The NRC is headed by five commissioners appointed by the president of the United States and confirmed by the United States Senate for five-year terms. One of them is designated by the president to be the chairman and official spokesperson of the commission. The chairman is the principal executive officer of the NRC, who exercise all of the executive and administrative functions of the commission.

The current chairman is Ho Nieh. President Trump designated Nieh as chairman of the NRC effective January 8, 2026.

=== Current commissioners ===
The current commissioners as of January 8, 2026:

Position	Name	Party	Took office	Term expires
Chair	Ho Nieh	Republican	December 4, 2025	June 30, 2029
Member	Bradley Crowell	Democratic	August 26, 2022	June 30, 2027
Member	Matthew Marzano	Democratic	January 8, 2025	June 30, 2028
Member	David A. Wright	Republican	August 1, 2025	June 30, 2030
Member	Doug W. Weaver	Republican	December 22, 2025	June 30, 2031

=== List of chairpersons ===
No.	Name (chair)	Photo	Term of office		Notes	Appointed by
1	Bill Anders		January 19, 1975	April 20, 1976		Gerald Ford
2	Marcus A. Rowden		January 19, 1975	January 15, 1977		Gerald Ford
3	Joseph M. Hendrie		March 3, 1977	December 7, 1979		Jimmy Carter
4	John F. Ahearne		December 7, 1979	March 2, 1981		Jimmy Carter
5	Nunzio J. Palladino		July 1, 1981	June 30, 1986		Ronald Reagan
6	Lando W. Zech Jr.		July 1, 1986	June 3, 1989		Ronald Reagan
7	Kenneth Monroe Carr		July 1, 1989	June 30, 1991		George H.W Bush
8	Ivan Selin		July 1, 1991	June 30, 1995		George H.W Bush
9	Shirley Ann Jackson		July 1, 1995	June 30, 1999		Bill Clinton
10	Greta Joy Dicus		July 1, 1999	October 29, 1999		Bill Clinton
11	Richard Meserve		October 29, 1999	March 31, 2003		Bill Clinton
12	Nils J. Diaz		April 1, 2003	June 30, 2006		George W. Bush
13	Dale E. Klein		July 1, 2006	May 13, 2009		George W. Bush
14	Gregory Jaczko		May 13, 2009	July 9, 2012		Barack Obama
15	Allison Macfarlane		July 9, 2012	December 31, 2014		Barack Obama
16	Stephen G. Burns		January 1, 2015	January 23, 2017		Barack Obama
17	Kristine Svinicki		January 23, 2017	January 20, 2021		Donald Trump
18	Christopher T. Hanson		January 20, 2021	January 20, 2025		Joe Biden
19	David A. Wright		January 20, 2025	June 30, 2025		Donald Trump
19	David A. Wright		August 1, 2025	January 8, 2026		Donald Trump
20	Ho Nieh		January 8, 2026	Present		Donald Trump

=== List of commissioners ===
Portrait	Commissioner	Took office	Left office
	Marcus A. Rowden	January 19, 1975	April 20, 1977
	Edward A. Mason	January 19, 1975	January 15, 1977
	Victor Gilinsky	January 19, 1975	June 30, 1984
	Richard T. Kennedy	January 19, 1975	June 30, 1980
	Joseph Hendrie	August 9, 1977	June 30, 1981
	Peter A. Bradford	August 15, 1977	March 12, 1982
	John F. Ahearne	July 31, 1978	June 30, 1983
	Nunzio J. Palladiono	July 1, 1981	June 30, 1986
	Thomas M. Roberts	August 3, 1981	June 30, 1990
	James K. Asselstine	May 17, 1982	June 30, 1987
	Frederick M. Bernthal	August 4, 1983	June 30, 1988
	Lando W. Zech Jr.	July 3, 1984	June 30, 1989
	Kenneth Monroe Carr	August 14, 1986	June 30, 1991
	Kenneth C. Rogers	August 7, 1987	June 30, 1997
	James R. Curtiss	October 20, 1988	June 30, 1993
	Forrest J. Remick	December 1, 1989	June 30, 1994
	Ivan Selin	July 1, 1991	June 30, 1995
	E. Gail de Planque	December 16, 1991	June 30, 1995
	Shirley Ann Jackson	May 2, 1995	June 30, 1999
	Greta J. Dicus	February 15, 1996	June 30, 2003
	Nils J. Diaz	August 23, 1996	June 30, 2006
	Edward McGaffigan Jr.	August 28, 1996	September 2, 2007
	Jeffrey S. Merrifield	October 23, 1998	June 30, 2007
	Richard Meserve	October 29, 1999	March 31, 2003
	Gregory Jaczko	January 21, 2005	July 9, 2012
	Peter B. Lyons	January 25, 2005	June 30, 2009
	Dale E. Klein	July 1, 2006	March 29, 2010
	Kristine Svinicki	March 28, 2008	January 20, 2021
	George Apostolakis	March 29, 2010	June 30, 2014
	William D. Magwood IV	March 29, 2010	August 31, 2014
	William C. Ostendorff	March 29, 2010	June 30, 2016
	Allison Macfarlane	July 9, 2012	December 31, 2014
	Jeff Baran	October 14, 2014	June 30, 2023
	Stephen G. Burns	November 4, 2014	April 30, 2019
	Annie Caputo	May 29, 2018	June 30, 2021
	David A. Wright	May 30, 2018	June 30, 2025
	Christopher T. Hanson	June 8, 2020	June 13, 2025
	Annie Caputo	August 9, 2022	August 1, 2025
	Bradley Crowell	August 26, 2022	Present
	Matthew Marzano	January 8, 2025	Present
	David A. Wright	August 1, 2025	Present
	Ho Nieh	December 4, 2025	Present
	Doug W. Weaver	December 22, 2025	Present

== Organization ==
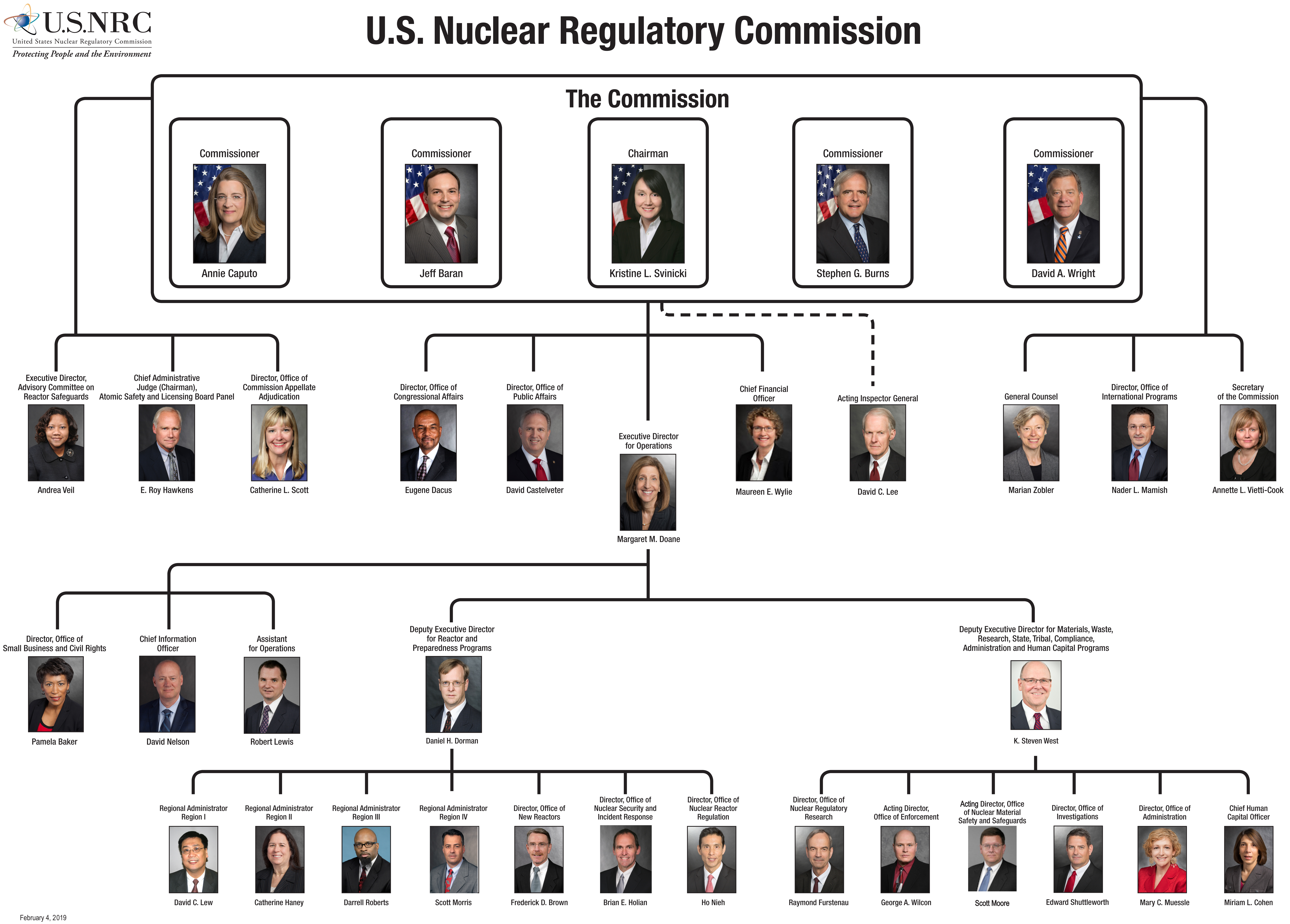
NRC Organizational Chart in February 2019

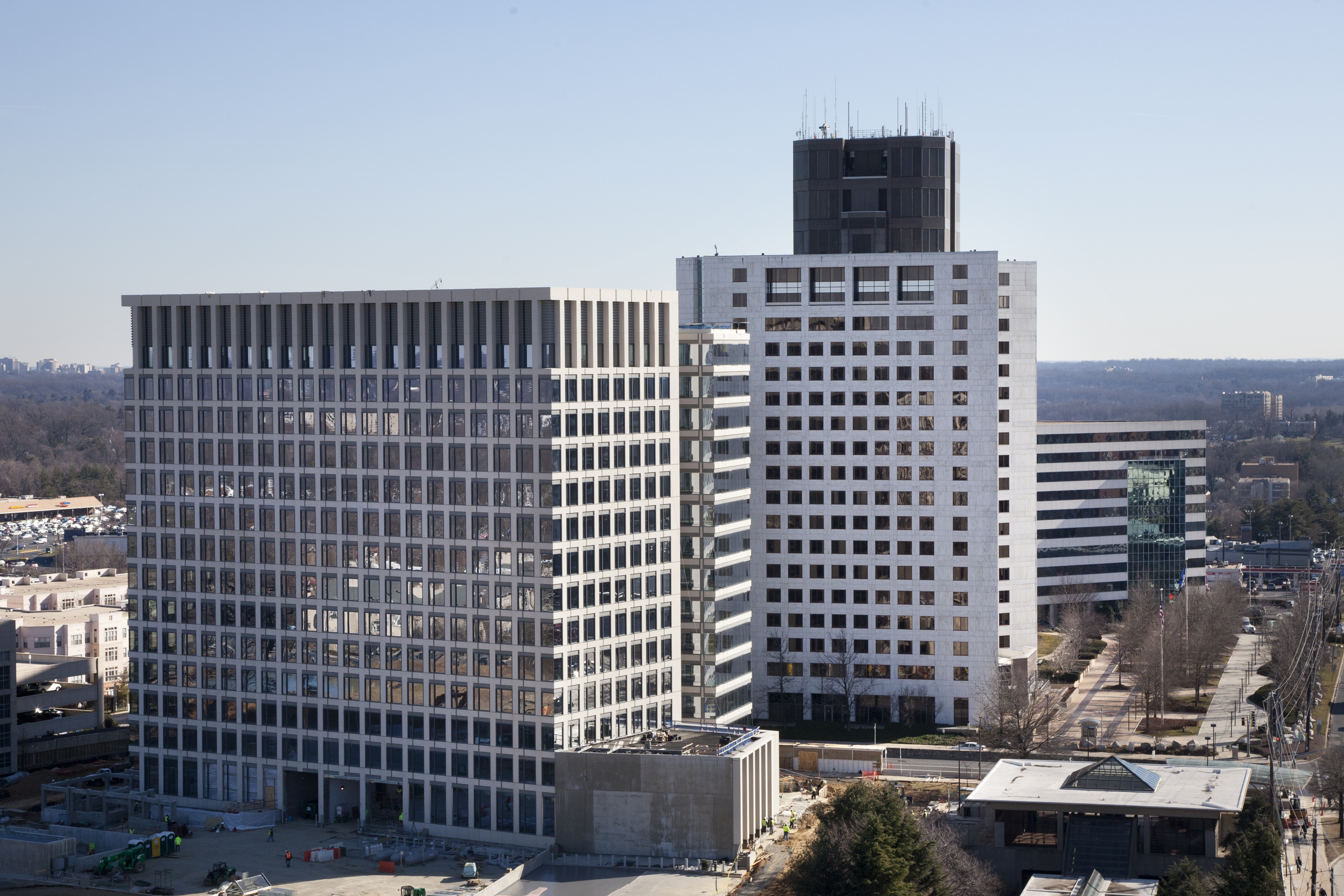
The three building that comprise NRC's North Bethesda campus, with North Bethesda station in the right bottom corner

The NRC consists of the commission on the one hand and offices of the executive director for Operations on the other. The commission is divided into two committees (Advisory Committee on Reactor Safeguards and Advisory Committee on the Medical Uses of Isotopes) and one Board, the Atomic Safety and Licensing Board Panel, as well as eight commission staff offices (Office of Commission Appellate Adjudication, Office of Congressional Affairs, Office of the General Counsel, Office of International Programs, Office of Public Affairs, Office of the Secretary, Office of the Chief Financial Officer, Office of the Executive Director for Operations).

Christopher T. Hanson is the chairman of the NRC. There are 14 Executive Director for Operations offices: Office of Nuclear Material Safety and Safeguards, Office of Nuclear Reactor Regulation, Office of Nuclear Regulatory Research, Office of Enforcement, which investigates reports by nuclear power whistleblowers, specifically the Allegations Program, Office of Investigations, Office of Nuclear Security and Incident Response, Region I, Region II, Region III, Region IV, Office of the Chief Information Officer, Office of Administration, Office of the Chief Human Capital Officer, and Office of Small Business and Civil Rights.

Of these operations offices, NRC's major program components are the first two offices mentioned above.

NRC's proposed FY 2024 budget is $9.949 million, with 2897.9 full-time equivalents (FTE), 90 percent of which is recovered by fees. This is an increase of $5.1million, compared to FY 2023.

NRC headquarters offices are located in unincorporated North Bethesda, Maryland (although the mailing address for two of the three main buildings in the complex list the city as Rockville, MD), and there are four regional offices.

=== Regions ===
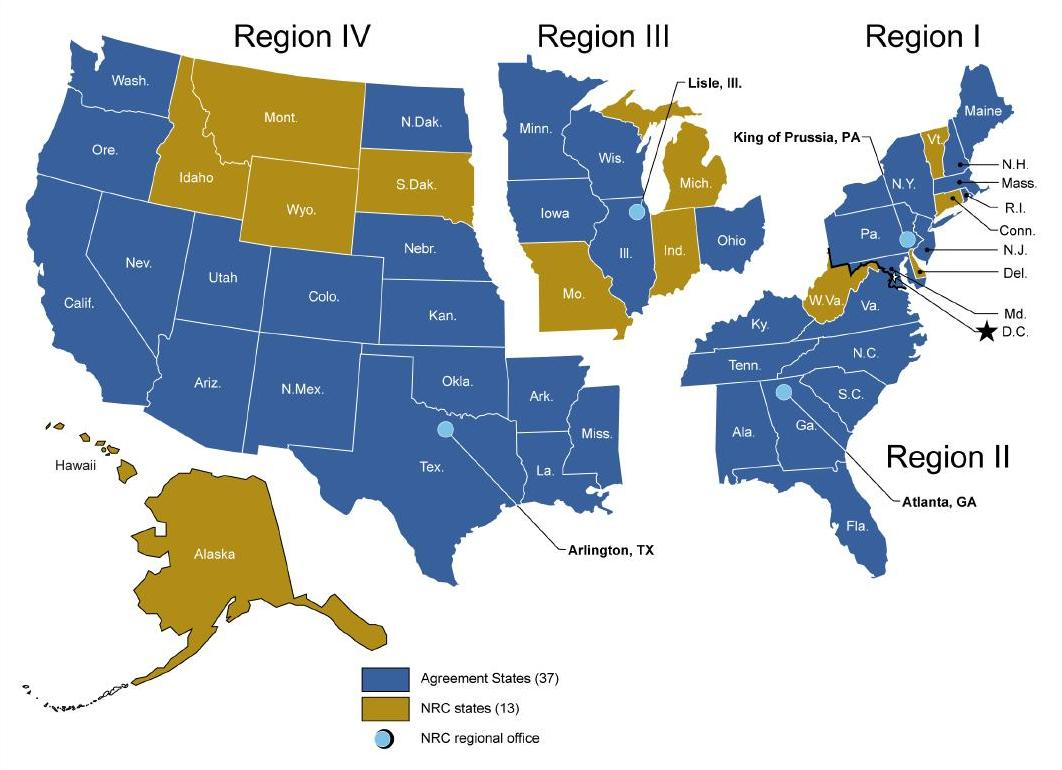
Map of the NRC regions

The NRC territory is broken down into four geographical regions; until the late 1990s, there was a Region V office in Walnut Creek, California which was absorbed into Region IV, and Region V was dissolved.

- Region I, located in King of Prussia, Pennsylvania, oversees the northeastern states.
- Region II, located in Atlanta, Georgia, oversees most of the southeastern states.
- Region III, located in Naperville, Illinois, oversees the Midwest.
- Region IV, located in Arlington, Texas, oversees the western and south central states.

In these four regions NRC oversees the operation of US nuclear reactors, namely 94 power-producing reactors, and 31 non-power-producing, or research and test reactors. Oversight is done on several levels. For example:

- Each power-producing reactor site has resident inspectors, who monitor day-to-day operations.
- Numerous special inspection teams, with many different specialties, routinely conduct inspections at each site.

=== Agreement States ===
Agreement States have entered into agreements with the NRC that give them the authority to license and inspect byproduct, source, or special nuclear materials used or possessed within their borders. Any applicant, other than a Federal agency or Federally recognized Indian tribe, who wishes to possess or use licensed material in one of these Agreement States should contact the responsible officials in that State for guidance on preparing an application. These applications should be filed with State officials, not with the NRC.

== Recordkeeping system ==
NRC has a library, which also contains online document collections. In 1984 it started an electronic repository called ADAMS, the Agencywide Documents Access and Management System, for its public inspection reports, correspondence, and other technical documents written by NRC staff, contractors, and licensees. It was upgraded in October 2010 to a web-based system. In 2025, a new interface (ADAMS Public Search) was introduced with upgraded user interface, search, and reporting features. Of documents from 1980 to 1999 only some have abstracts and/or full text; most are citations. Documents from before 1980 are available in paper or microfiche formats. Copies of these older documents or classified documents can be applied for with a FOIA request.

== Training and accreditation ==
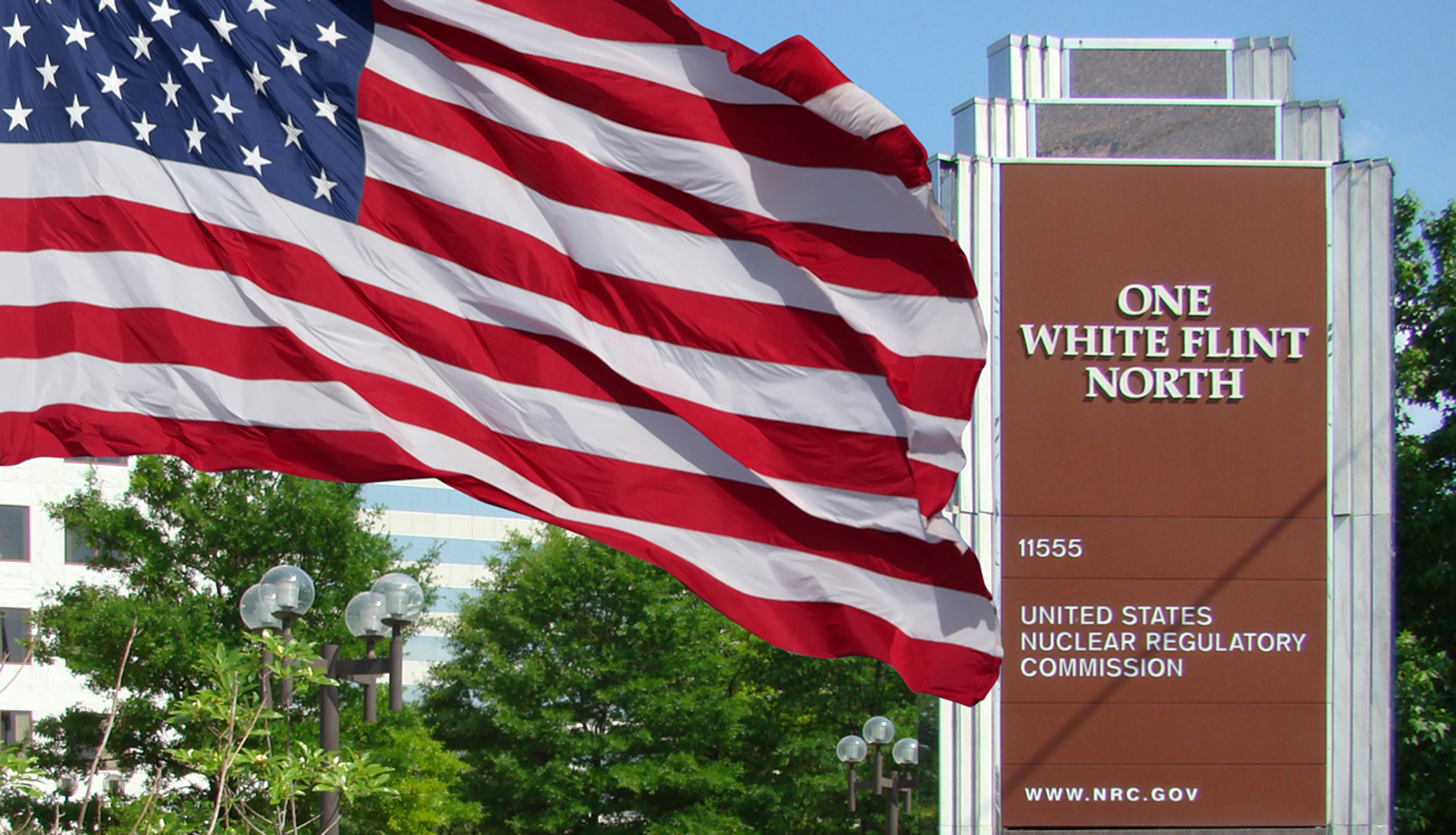
Commission headquarters

NRC conducts audits and training inspections, observes the National Nuclear Accrediting Board meetings, and nominates some members.

The 1980 Kemeny Commission's report after the Three Mile Island accident recommended that the nuclear energy industry "set and police its own standards of excellence". The nuclear industry founded the Institute of Nuclear Power Operations (INPO) within 9 months to establish personnel training and qualification. The industry through INPO created the 'National Academy for Nuclear Training Program' either as early as 1980 or in September 1985 per the International Atomic Energy Agency. INPO refers to NANT as "our National Academy for Nuclear Training" on its website. NANT integrates and standardizes the training programs of INPO and US nuclear energy companies, offers training scholarships and interacts with the 'National Nuclear Accrediting Board'. This Board is closely related to the National Academy for Nuclear Training, not a government body, and referred to as independent by INPO, the Nuclear Energy Institute, and nuclear utilities. but not by the NRC, all of whom are represented on the board.

The 1982 Nuclear Waste Policy Act directed NRC in Section 306 to issue regulations or "other appropriate regulatory guidance" on training of nuclear plant personnel. Since the nuclear industry already had developed training and accreditation, NRC issued a policy statement in 1985, endorsing the INPO program. NRC has a memorandum of agreement with INPO and "monitors INPO activities by observing accreditation team visits and the monthly NNAB meetings".

In 1993, NRC endorsed the industry's approach to training that had been used for nearly a decade through its 'Training Rule'. In February 1994, NRC passed the 'Operator Requalification Rule' 59 FR 5938, Feb. 9, 1994, allowing each nuclear power plant company to conduct the operator licensing renewal examination every six years, eliminating the requirement of NRC-administered written requalification examination.

In 1999, NRC issued a final rule on operator initial licensing examination, that allows companies to prepare, proctor, and grade their own operator initial licensing examinations. Facilities can "upon written request" continue to have the examinations prepared and administered by NRC staff, but if a company volunteers to prepare the examination, NRC continues to approve and administer it.

Since 2000 meetings between NRC and applicants or licensees have been open to the public.

== Prospective nuclear units ==
Between 2007 and 2009, 13 companies applied to the Nuclear Regulatory Commission for construction and operating licenses to build 25 new nuclear power reactors in the United States. However, the case for widespread nuclear plant construction was eroded due to abundant natural gas supplies. Many license applications for proposed new reactors were suspended or cancelled. These will not be the cheapest energy options available, therefore not an attractive investment. In 2013, four reactors were permanently closed: San Onofre 2 and 3 in California, Crystal River 3 in Florida, and Kewaunee in Wisconsin. Vermont Yankee, in Vernon, was shut down on December 29, 2014. New York state eventually closed Indian Point Energy Center, in Buchanan, 30 miles from New York City, on April 30, 2021.

In 2019 the NRC approved a second 20-year license extension for Turkey Point units 3 and 4, the first time NRC had extended licenses to 80 years total lifetime. Similar extensions for about 20 reactors are planned or intended, with more expected in the future. This will reduce demand for replacement new builds.

== Controversy, concerns, and criticisms ==
Byrne and Hoffman wrote in 1996, that since the 1980s the NRC has generally favored the interests of nuclear industry, and been unduly responsive to industry concerns, while failing to pursue tough regulation. The NRC has often sought to hamper or deny public access to the regulatory process, and created new barriers to public participation.

Barack Obama, when running for president in 2007, said that the five-member NRC had become "captive of the industries that it regulates".

Numerous different observers have criticized the NRC as an example of regulatory capture The NRC has been accused of having conflicting roles as regulator and "salesman" in a 2011 Reuters article, doing an inadequate job by the Union of Concerned Scientists, and the agency approval process has been called a "rubber stamp".

Frank N. von Hippel wrote in March 2011, that despite the 1979 Three Mile Island accident in Pennsylvania, the NRC has often been too timid in ensuring that America's commercial reactors are operated safely:

Nuclear power regulation is a textbook example of the problem of "regulatory capture" — in which an industry gains control of an agency meant to regulate it. Regulatory capture can be countered only by vigorous public scrutiny and Congressional oversight, but in the 32 years since Three Mile Island, interest in nuclear regulation has declined precipitously.

An article in the Bulletin of the Atomic Scientists stated that many forms of NRC regulatory failure exist, including regulations ignored by the common consent of NRC and industry:

A worker (named George Galatis) at the Millstone Nuclear Power Plant in Connecticut kept warning management, that the spent fuel rods were being put too quickly into the spent storage pool and that the number of rods in the pool exceeded specifications. Management ignored him, so he went directly to the NRC, which eventually admitted that it knew of both of the forbidden practices, which happened at many plants, but chose to ignore them. The whistleblower was fired and blacklisted.

=== Terrorism concerns and threats ===
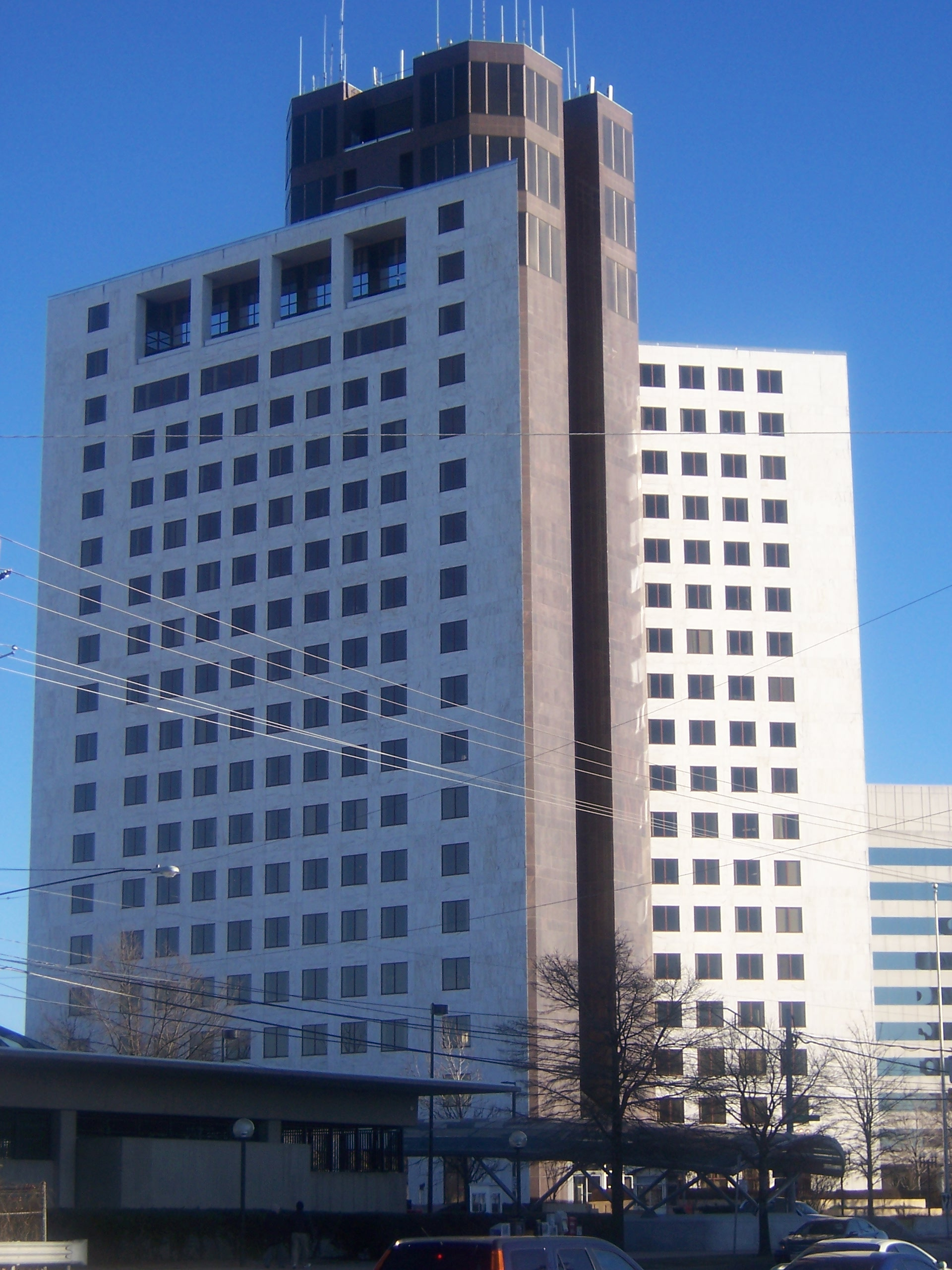
NRC headquarters outside Rockville, Maryland

Terrorist attacks such as those executed by al-Qaeda on New York City and Washington, D.C., on September 11, 2001, and in London on July 7, 2005, have prompted fears that extremist groups might use radioactive dirty bombs in further attacks in the United States and elsewhere. In March 2007, undercover investigators from the Government Accountability Office set up a false company and obtained a license from the Nuclear Regulatory Commission that would have allowed them to buy the radioactive materials needed for a dirty bomb. According to the GAO report, NRC officials did not visit the company or attempt to personally interview its executives. Instead, within 28 days, the NRC mailed the license to the West Virginia postal box. Upon receipt of the license, GAO officials were able to easily modify its stipulations and remove a limit on the amount of radioactive material they could buy. A spokesman for the NRC said that the agency considered the radioactive devices a "lower-level threat"; a bomb built with the materials could have contaminated an area about the length of a city block but would not have presented an immediate health hazard.

=== 1987 congressional report ===
Twelve years into NRC operations, a 1987 congressional report entitled "NRC Coziness with Industry" concluded, that the NRC "has not maintained an arms length regulatory posture with the commercial nuclear power industry ... [and] has, in some critical areas, abdicated its role as a regulator altogether". To cite three examples:

A 1986 Congressional report found that NRC staff had provided valuable technical assistance to the utility seeking an operating license for the controversial Seabrook plant. In the late 1980s, the NRC 'created a policy' of non-enforcement by asserting its discretion not to enforce license conditions; between September 1989 and 1994, the 'NRC has either waived or chosen not to enforce regulations at nuclear power reactors over 340 times'. Finally, critics charge that the NRC has ceded important aspects of regulatory authority to the industry's own Institute for Nuclear Power Operations (INPO), an organization formed by utilities in response to the Three Mile Island Accident.

=== Nuclear Reactor License Renewal Program ===
One example involves the license renewal program that NRC initiated to extend the operating licenses for the nation's fleet of commercial nuclear reactors. Environmental impact statements (EIS) were prepared for each reactor to extend the operational period from 40 to 60 years. One study examined the EISs and found significant flaws, included failure to consider significant issues of concern. It also found that the NRC management had significantly underestimated the risk and consequences posed by a severe reactor accident such as a full-scale nuclear meltdown. NRC management asserted, without scientific evidence, that the risk of such accidents were so "Small" that the impacts could be dismissed and therefore no analysis of human and environmental was even performed. Such a conclusion is scientifically indefensible given the experience of the Three Mile Island, Chernobyl, and Fukushima accidents. Another finding was that NRC had concealed the risk posed to the public at large by disregarding one of the most important EIS requirements, mandating that cumulative impacts be assessed (40 Code of Federal Regulations §1508.7). By disregarding this basic requirement, NRC effectively misrepresented the risk posed to the nation by approximately two orders of magnitude (i.e., the true risk is about 100 greater than NRC represented). These findings were corroborated in a final report prepared by a special Washington State Legislature Nuclear Power Task Force, titled, "Doesn't NRC Address Consequences of Severe Accidents in EISs for re-licensing?"

=== Post-Fukushima ===
In Vermont, the day before the 2011 Tōhoku earthquake and tsunami that damaged Japan's Fukushima Daiichi Nuclear Power Plant, the NRC approved a 20-year extension for the license of Vermont Yankee Nuclear Power Plant, although the Vermont state legislature voted overwhelmingly to deny an extension. The plant had been found to be leaking radioactive materials through a network of underground pipes, which Entergy had denied under oath even existed. At a hearing in 2009 Tony Klein, chairman of the Vermont House Natural Resources and Energy Committee had asked the NRC about the pipes and the NRC also did not know they existed.

In March 2011, the Union of Concerned Scientists released a study critical of the NRC's 2010 performance as a regulator. The UCS said that over the years, it had found the NRC's enforcement of safety rules has not been "timely, consistent, or effective" and it cited 14 "near-misses" at U.S. plants in 2010 alone.

In April 2011, Reuters reported that diplomatic cables showed NRC sometimes being used as a sales tool to help push American technology to foreign governments, when "lobbying for the purchase of equipment made by Westinghouse Electric Company and other domestic manufacturers". This gives the appearance of a regulator which is acting in a commercial capacity, "raising concerns about a potential conflict of interest".

San Clemente Green, an environmental group opposed to the continued operation of the San Onofre Nuclear Plant, claimed in 2011 that instead of being a watchdog, the NRC too often rules in favor of nuclear plant operators.

In 2011, the Tōhoku earthquake and tsunami led to unprecedented damage and flooding of the Fukushima Daiichi Nuclear Power Plant. The subsequent loss of offsite power and flooding of onsite emergency diesel generators led to loss of coolant and subsequent Nuclear meltdown of three reactor cores. The Fukushima Daiichi nuclear disaster led to an uncontrolled release of radioactive contamination, and forced the Japanese Government to evacuate approximately 100,000 citizens.

Gregory Jaczko was chairman of the NRC when the 2011 Fukushima disaster occurred in Japan. Jaczko looked for lessons for the US, and strengthened security regulations for nuclear power plants. For example, he supported the requirement that new plants be able to withstand an aircraft crash. On February 9, 2012, Jaczko cast the lone dissenting vote on plans to build the first new nuclear power plant in more than 30 years when the NRC voted 4–1 to allow Atlanta-based Southern Co to build and operate two new nuclear power reactors at its existing Vogtle Electric Generating Plant in Georgia. He cited safety concerns stemming from Japan's 2011 Fukushima nuclear disaster, saying "I cannot support issuing this license as if Fukushima never happened". In July 2011, Mark Cooper said that the Nuclear Regulatory Commission is "on the defensive to prove it is doing its job of ensuring safety". In October 2011, Jaczko described "a tension between wanting to move in a timely manner on regulatory questions, and not wanting to go too fast".

In 2011 Edward J. Markey, Democrat of Massachusetts, criticized the NRC's response to the Fukushima Daiichi nuclear disaster and the decision-making on the proposed Westinghouse AP1000 reactor design.

In 2011, a total of 45 groups and individuals from across the nation formally asked the NRC to suspend all licensing and other activities at 21 proposed nuclear reactor projects in 15 states until the NRC completed a thorough post-Fukushima nuclear disaster examination:

The petition seeks suspension of six existing reactor license renewal decisions (Columbia Generating Station, WA Davis–Besse Nuclear Power Station, OH, Diablo Canyon Power Plant, CA, Indian Point Energy Center, NY, Pilgrim Nuclear Generating Station, MA, and Seabrook Station Nuclear Power Plant, NH); 13 new reactor combined construction permit and operating license decisions (Bellefonte Nuclear Generating Station Units 3 and 4, AL, Bell Bend, Callaway Nuclear Generating Station, MO, Calvert Cliffs Nuclear Generating Station, MD, Comanche Peak Nuclear Power Plant, TX, Enrico Fermi Nuclear Generating Station, MI, Levy County Nuclear Power Plant, FL North Anna Nuclear Generating Station, VA, Shearon Harris Nuclear Power Plant, NC, South Texas Nuclear Generating Station, TX, Turkey Point Nuclear Generating Station, FL, Alvin W. Vogtle Electric Generating Plant, GA, and William States Lee III Nuclear Generating Station, SC);a construction permit decision (Bellefonte Units 1 and 2); and an operating license decision (Watts Bar Nuclear Generating Station, TN). In addition, the petition asks the NRC to halt proceedings to approve the standardized AP1000 and Economic Simplified Boiling Water Reactor designs.

The petitioners asked the NRC to supplement its own investigation by establishing an independent commission comparable to that set up in the wake of the less severe 1979 Three Mile Island accident. The petitioners included Public Citizen, Southern Alliance for Clean Energy, and San Luis Obispo Mothers for Peace.

=== Intentionally concealing reports concerning the risks of flooding ===
Following the Fukushima disaster, the NRC prepared a report in 2011 to examine the risk that dam failures posed on the nation's fleet of nuclear reactors. A redacted version of NRC's report on dam failures was posted on the NRC website on March 6. The original, un-redacted version was leaked to the public.

The un-redacted version which was leaked to the public highlights the threat that flooding poses to nuclear power plants located near large dams and substantiates claims that NRC management has intentionally misled the public for years about the severity of the flooding.

The leaked version of the report concluded that one-third of the U.S. nuclear fleet (34 plants) may face flooding hazards greater than they were designed to withstand. It also shows that NRC management was aware of some aspects of this risk for 15 years and yet it had done nothing to effectively address the problem. Some flooding events are so serious that they could result in a "severe" nuclear accident, up to, and including, a nuclear meltdown.

This criticism is corroborated by two NRC whistleblowers who accused their management of deliberately covering up information concerning the vulnerability of flooding, and of failing to take corrective actions despite being aware of these risks for years. Richard Perkins, a second risk engineer with the NRC and the lead author of the leaked report, filed a complaint with the agency's Inspector General, asserting that NRC staff had improperly redacted information from the public version of his report "to prevent the disclosure of this safety information to the public because it will embarrass the agency." Perkins wrote. "Concurrently, the NRC concealed the information from the public."

Larry Criscione, a second NRC risk engineer also raised concerns about the NRC withholding information concerning the risk of flooding. He stated that assertions by NRC's management that plants are "currently able to mitigate flooding events," was false.

David Lochbaum, a nuclear engineer and safety advocate with the Union of Concerned Scientists: "The redacted information shows that the NRC is lying to the American public about the safety of U.S. reactors,"

The Oconee Nuclear Station has been shown to be at particular risk from flooding. An NRC letter dated 2009 states that "a Jocassee Dam failure is a credible event". It goes on to state that "NRC staff expressed concerns that Duke has not demonstrated that the [null Oconee Nuclear Station] units will be adequately protected."

NRC's 2011 leaked report notes that "dam failure incidents are common". NRC estimated the odds that dams constructed like Jocassee will fail is about 1 in 3,600 failures per year. Oconee is licensed to operate for another 20 years. The odds of the Jocassee Dam failing over that period are 1 in 180. NRC requires risks to be investigated if they have a frequency of more than 1 in 10,000 years. For a reactor operating over a period of 40 years, these risks must be evaluated if they have a chance greater than a 1 in 250 of occurring.

NRC identified 34 reactors that lie downstream from a total of more than 50 dams. More than half of these dams are roughly the size of the Jocassee dam. Assuming the NRC's failure rate applies to all of these dams, the chance that one will fail over the next 40 years is about one in four or 25 percent chance. This dam failure rate does not include risks posed by earthquakes or terrorism. Thus, the true probability may be much higher.

This raised a second and potentially larger issue. NRC recently completed its license renewal program which extended the operating licenses of the nation's fleet of nuclear reactors for an additional 20 years. NRC stated that the probability of a severe accident is so incredible that the consequences can be dismissed from the analysis of impacts in its relicensing environmental impact statements (EIS). Yet this conflicts with NRC's internal analyses which concluded that flooding presented a serious human and environmental risk. Critics charge that if these relicensing EISs failed to evaluate the risks of flooding, then how can the public be confident that NRC did not mislead stakeholders concerning other risks such as the potential for a nuclear meltdown.

NRC officials stated in June 2011 that US nuclear safety rules do not adequately weigh the risk of a single event that would knock out electricity from the grid and from emergency generators, as a quake and tsunami did in Japan. In October 2011, and NRC instructed agency staff to move forward with seven of the 12 safety recommendations put forward by a federal task force in July 2011. The recommendations include "new standards aimed at strengthening operators' ability to deal with a complete loss of power, ensuring plants can withstand floods and earthquakes and improving emergency response capabilities". The new safety standards will take up to five years to fully implement.

In November 2011, Jaczko warned power companies against complacency and said the agency must "push ahead with new rules prompted by the nuclear crisis in Japan, while also resolving long-running issues involving fire protection and a new analysis of earthquake risks".

The U.S. Nuclear Regulatory Commission has also been criticized for its reluctance to allow for innovation and experimentation, even controlled for and purportedly safe methods of deploying nuclear power that countries such as Poland are approving before the United States. As reported by Reason magazine in May 2022:

Oregon's NuScale Power signed an agreement with the Polish mining and processing firm KGHM to deploy NuScale's innovative small modular nuclear reactors (SMRs) in Poland by 2029. At the U.N.'s Glasgow Climate Change Conference in November, NuScale contracted with a Romanian energy company to deploy its SMR technology in that country by 2028. NuScale has signed similar memoranda of understanding with electric power companies in Bulgaria, the Czech Republic, and Ukraine.

This kind of advanced energy technology will likely be powering homes and businesses in Europe before the first reactor is completed in the United States. That's because the U.S. Nuclear Regulatory Commission (NRC) is in no hurry to help.

=== Exceeding powers licensing off-site interim storage facility ===
In September 2021 the NRC issued a license for a privately operated temporary consolidated interim storage facility (CISF) for spent nuclear fuel in Andrews County, Texas. However a group including the State of Texas, which had passed a law in 2022 prohibiting the storage of high-level waste in the state, petitioned for a court review of the license. In August 2023 the United States Court of Appeals for the Fifth Circuit ruled that the NRC does not have the authority from Congress under the Atomic Energy Act or the Nuclear Waste Policy Act to license such a temporary storage facility that is not at a nuclear power station or federal site, nullifying the purported license. Another CISF in New Mexico is similarly being challenged in the United States Court of Appeals for the Tenth Circuit.

== See also ==
- International Atomic Energy Agency
- International Nuclear Regulators' Association
- List of canceled nuclear plants in the United States
- Nuclear power in the United States
- Nuclear renaissance in the United States
- Nuclear safety in the United States
- Title 10 of the Code of Federal Regulations
- Atomic Safety and Licensing Board
- ADVANCE Act
