= List of mayors of Carson City, Nevada =

Mayors of Carson City, Nevada, USA

The following is a list of mayors of Carson City, Nevada, USA.

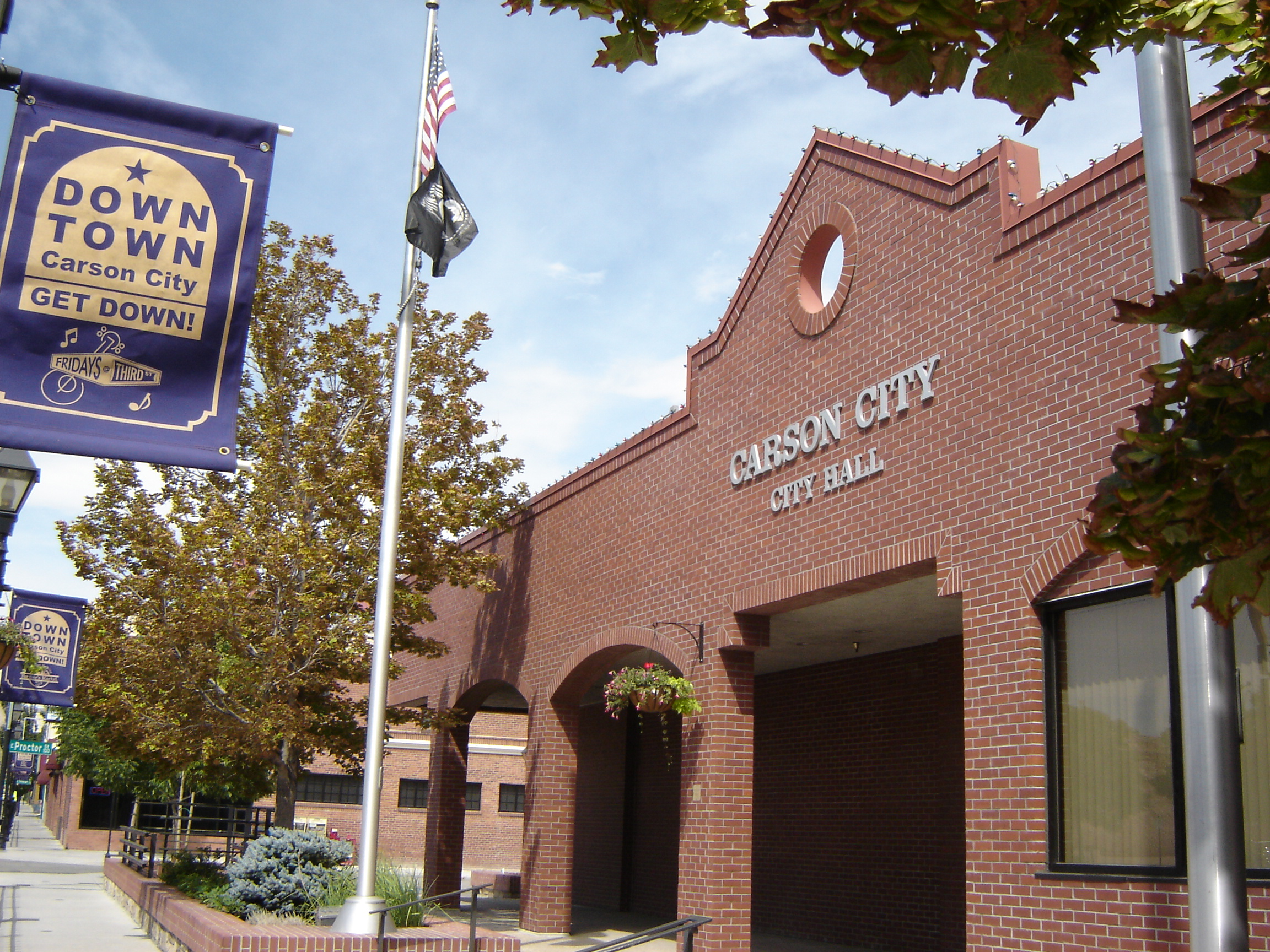
City Hall building, Carson City, Nevada, US, in 2009

== Presidents of the Board of Trustees ==
- Henry F. Rice, 1875–1877
- David A. Bender, 1877–1878, 1880–1882
- Edwin F. Gibson, 1878
- Jacob Muller, 1882–1884, 1886–1887
- R. W. Bollen, 1884–1885
- James A. Kennedy, 1885–1886
- Geo. C. Bryson Jr., 1887–1888
- Theodore R. Hofer, 1888–1894
- Dwight Edwards, 1894
- John Kersey, 1895
- Marvin Hume Yerington, 1895–1896
- George H. Meyers, ca.1898–1899
- Will U. Mackey, ca.1901–1905
- J.T. Davis, ca.1905
- Harton B. Van Etten, ca.1908
- Joseph Poujade, ca.1911–1913
- Alexander MacDonald, ca.1913–1916
- William O. Woodbury, ca.1916
- Theodore L. Hawkins, ca.1920
- Adelbert B. Gray, 1921–1923
- William E. Wallace, ca.1923, 1929
- Denis Hurley, ca.1925
- George B. Spradling, ca.1929
- Arnold Millard, 1931–1935
- Michael Edgar Norton, ca.1939
- George Lind, ca.1945
- Roy M. Elston, ca.1947
- Caro M. Pendergraft, ca.1949
- Wilbur Stodieck, ca.1951
- Turner Houston, ca.1955
- Harley Carter, ca.1959
- Albert A. Autrand, ca.1961
- James Y. Robertson, ca.1963–1967

== Mayors ==
- Eugene M. Scrivner, 1969–1976
- Harold Jacobsen, 1977–1984
- Dan Flammer, 1985–1988
- Marv Teixeira, 1989–1996, ca.2004–2008
- Ray Masayko, 1997–2004
- Bob Crowell, 2009–2020
- Lori Bagwell, 2021–present

== See also ==
- Carson City history
