= Stephen G. Burns =

American lawyer

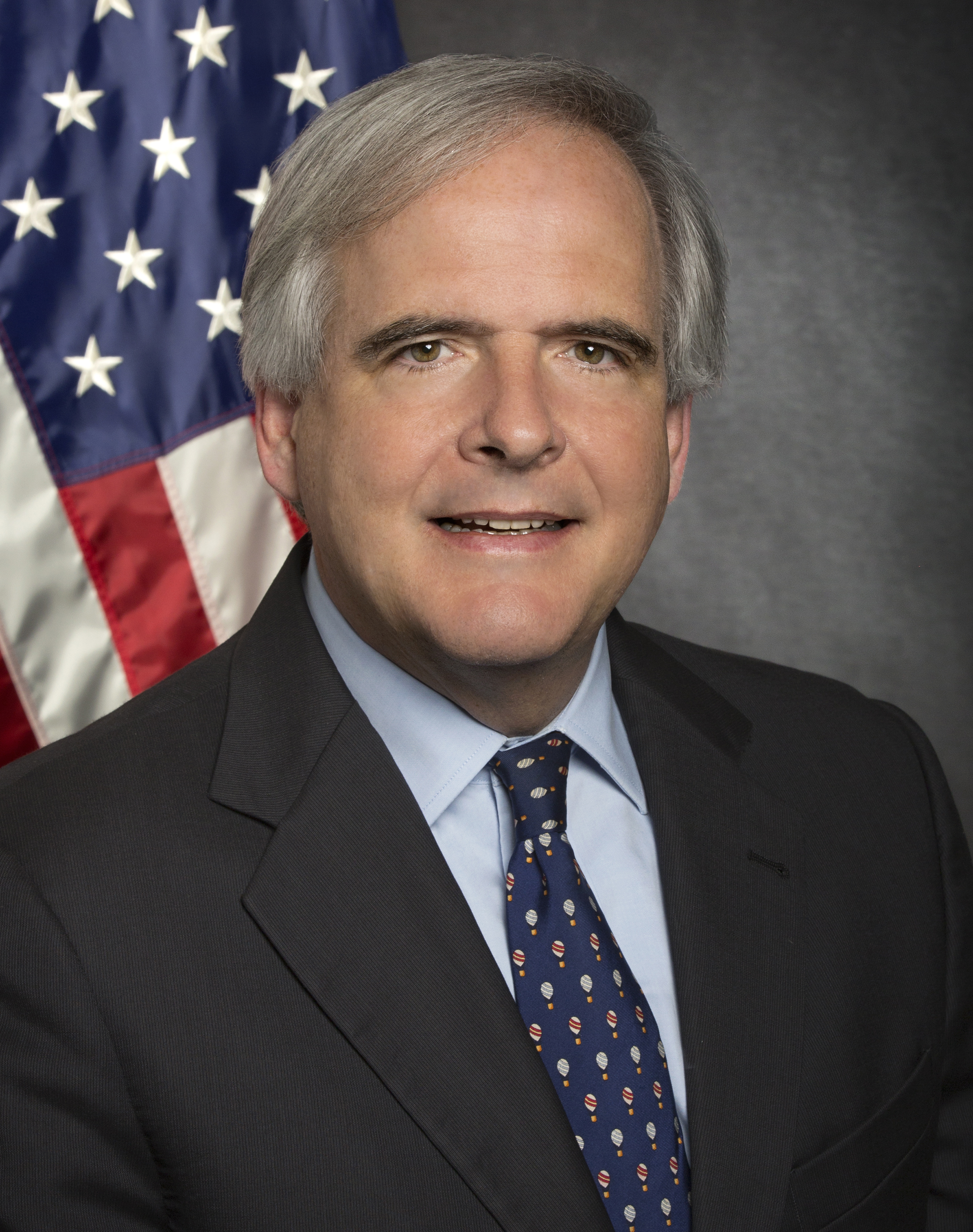
- Burns in 2014

15th Chairman of the Nuclear Regulatory Commission
- In office January 1, 2015 – January 23, 2017
- President: Barack Obama
- Preceded by: Allison Macfarlane
- Succeeded by: Kristine Svinicki

Commissioner of the Nuclear Regulatory Commission
- In office November 4, 2014 – April 30, 2019
- President: Barack Obama; Donald Trump
- Preceded by: George Apostolakis
- Succeeded by: Christopher T. Hanson

Personal details
- Party: Independent
- Education: Colgate University; George Washington University

Stephen G. Burns is an American lawyer and the 15th and former chairman of the Nuclear Regulatory Commission.

== Education and career ==
Burns received a bachelor's degree in 1975 from Colgate University in Hamilton, New York. He received his J.D. degree with honors in 1978 from George Washington University in Washington, D.C., where he was an editor on the George Washington Law Review.

Burns joined the NRC as an attorney in 1978. He served as Deputy General Counsel starting in 1998 then served as General Counsel from May 2009 until April 2012. He left the NRC to serve as Head of Legal Affairs of the Nuclear Energy Agency (NEA) of the Organisation for Economic Co-operation and Development in Paris from April 2012, until he rejoined the NRC in November 2014 with a term which ended on April 30, 2019. He served as the 16th chairman of NRC from January 2014 to January 2017. He was appointed as the chair of the IAEA’s International Nuclear Safety Advisory Group in May 2022.
