= Kristine Svinicki =

American nuclear engineer

Kristine L. Svinicki
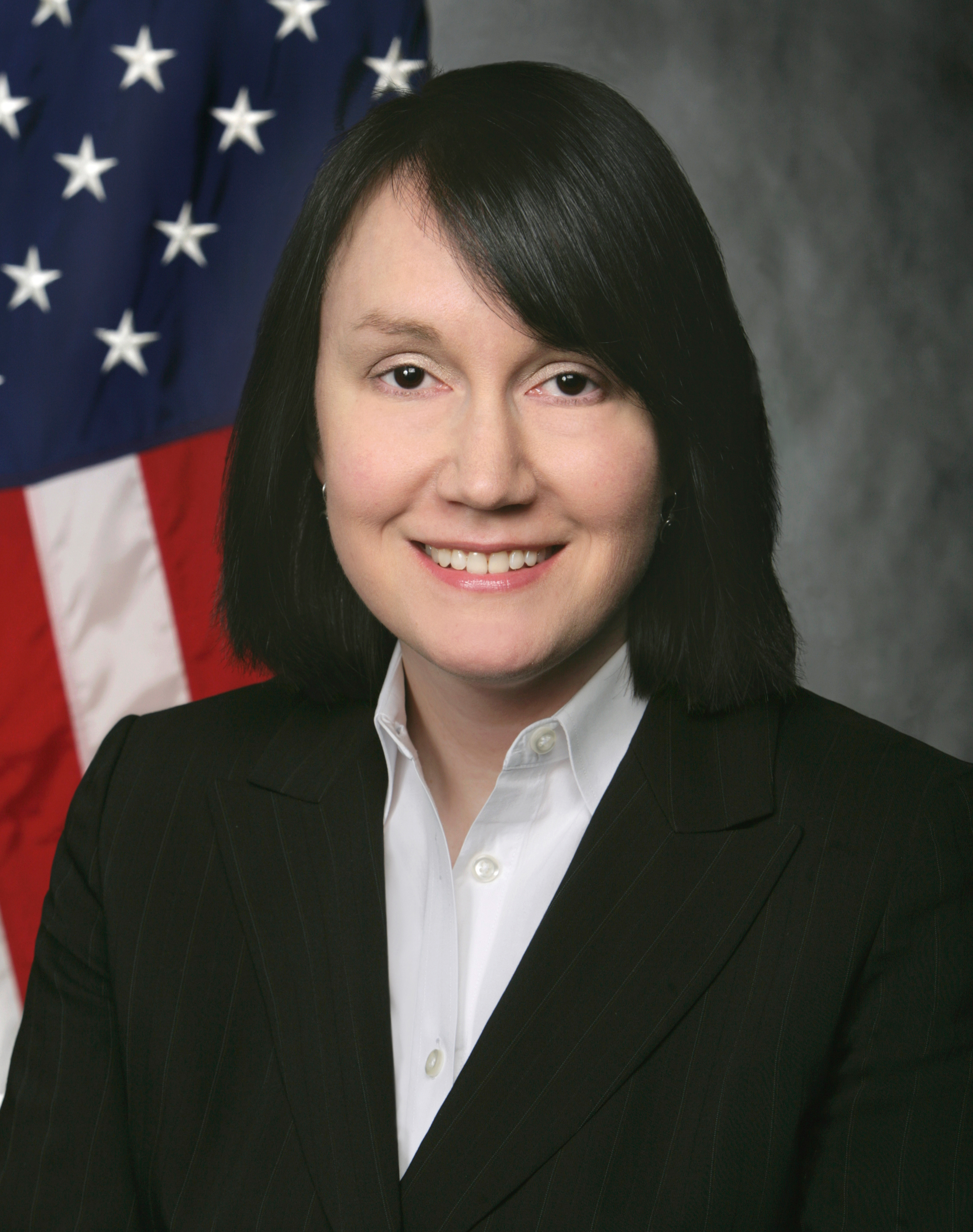
- Svinicki in 2008

16th Chair of the Nuclear Regulatory Commission
- In office January 23, 2017 – January 20, 2021
- President: Donald Trump
- Preceded by: Stephen G. Burns
- Succeeded by: Christopher T. Hanson

Commissioner of the Nuclear Regulatory Commission
- In office March 28, 2008 – January 20, 2021
- President: George W. Bush; Barack Obama; Donald Trump
- Preceded by: Jeffrey S. Merrifield
- Succeeded by: Bradley Crowell

Personal details
- Born: September 6, 1966 (age 60) Jackson, Michigan
- Party: Republican
- Education: University of Michigan

Kristine Lou Svinicki (born September 6, 1966) is an American nuclear engineer and the 16th and former chair of the Nuclear Regulatory Commission.

== Early life and education ==
Svinicki, who is one of seven siblings, was born in Jackson, Michigan. Both of her parents died when she was a teenager. She earned a bachelor's degree in nuclear engineering from the University of Michigan in 1988.

== Career ==
Svinicki began her career as an energy engineer for the state of Wisconsin at the Wisconsin Public Service Commission. She worked as a nuclear engineer in the U.S. Department of Energy's Washington, D.C. Offices of Nuclear Energy, Science and Technology, and of Civilian Radioactive Waste Management, as well as its Idaho Operations Office. She served as a staff member on the Senate Armed Services Committee for Sen. John Warner and Sen. John McCain.

Svinicki has a history of making political donations to Republican candidates.

She was sworn in as a commissioner of the NRC on March 28, 2008, and for a second term ending June 30, 2017. She was designated chairwoman by President Donald Trump on January 23, 2017. On June 26, 2017, she was confirmed by the U.S. Senate to a five-year term as the NRC's chairperson. She resigned as Commissioner and chairwoman on January 20, 2021.

At the time of her departure from the NRC, she thanked President Trump: “I was humbled when President Trump designated me NRC Chairman on Inauguration Day four years ago. After nine years of service as a Commissioner, I hope I put my prior experience to good effect and that my work as Chairman has fulfilled, in some small measure, the confidence the President expressed in my capabilities in offering me this opportunity to lead.”
