= Joseph Hendrie =

American physicist (1925–2023)

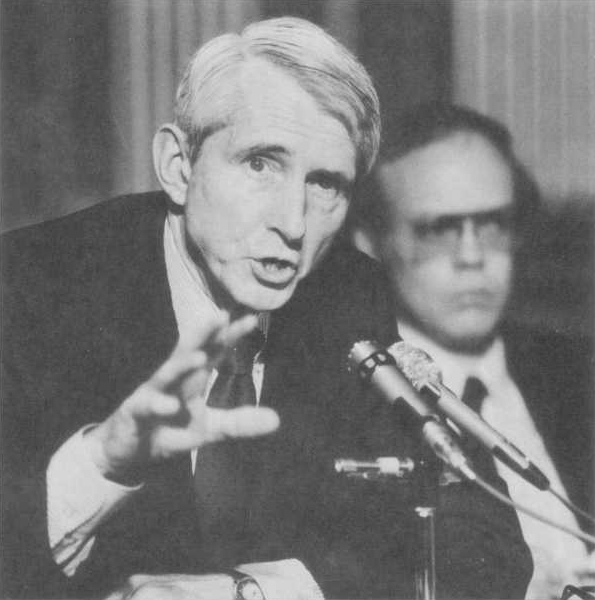
- Hendrie testifying at a hearing in 1979
- Born: Joseph Mallam Hendrie; March 18, 1925; Janesville, Wisconsin, U.S.
- Died: December 26, 2023 (aged 98); Bellport, New York, U.S.
- Education: Case Institute of Technology; Columbia University
- Occupation: Physicist
- Known for: Former Chairman of the United States Nuclear Regulatory Commission
- Spouse: Elaine Kostell
- Children: 2

Joseph Mallam Hendrie (March 18, 1925 – December 26, 2023) was an American physicist who was chairman of the U.S. Nuclear Regulatory Commission (NRC). On August 9, 1977 he was named to a four-year term on the Commission and designated as its chairman by President Jimmy Carter. From 1975 to 1977, Hendrie had served as chairman of the Department of Applied Science at Brookhaven National Laboratory.

Hendrie was elected a member of the National Academy of Engineering in 1976 for contributions to both physics and engineering of research reactors and to the safety of large power reactors.

== Education and early career ==
Hendrie received a B.S. degree in Physics from Case Institute of Technology in 1950. He received a Ph.D. degree in physics from Columbia University in 1957.

Hendrie worked at Brookhaven from 1955 to 1977.

== Three Mile Island accident ==
On March 28, 1979, the Three Mile Island nuclear plant, along the Susquehanna River located south of Harrisburg, Pennsylvania, suffered a partial meltdown. Although the meltdown was contained and radiation leakages were minimal, there were still worries that an evacuation would be necessary. Immediately following the accident, Hendrie advised Pennsylvania Governor Dick Thornburgh to order the evacuation "of pregnant women and pre-school age children ... within a five-mile radius of the Three Mile Island facility." Within days, 140,000 people had left the area.

== Fukushima reactors and accident ==
In the period when the GE Mark 1 commercial nuclear reactor designs were being installed and started up by Tokyo Electric Power Company at Fukushima, Japan, Hendrie addressed the design. "In 1972, Atomic Energy Commission safety official Stephen Hanauer recommended that the Mark I design be discontinued, arguing that the small containment design left it vulnerable to explosions from hydrogen buildup. At the time, soon-to-be-chairman of the [NRC ...] Hendrie said acceptance of the Mark I technology was so widespread that 'reversal of this hallowed policy, particularly at this time, could well be the end of nuclear power'." In the Fukushima Daiichi nuclear disaster following the Tōhoku earthquake and tsunami in March 2011, Fukushima reactors saw several hydrogen explosions, amongst other breakdowns.

== Later life and death ==
Hendrie served as president of the American Nuclear Society from 1984 to 1985. He died in Bellport, New York on December 26, 2023 at the age of 98.

== Publication ==
- Hendrie, Joseph M., The future course of nuclear-power regulation, 1982. Pdf from Department of Energy.
