= Christopher T. Hanson =

American nuclear engineer

Christopher Hanson
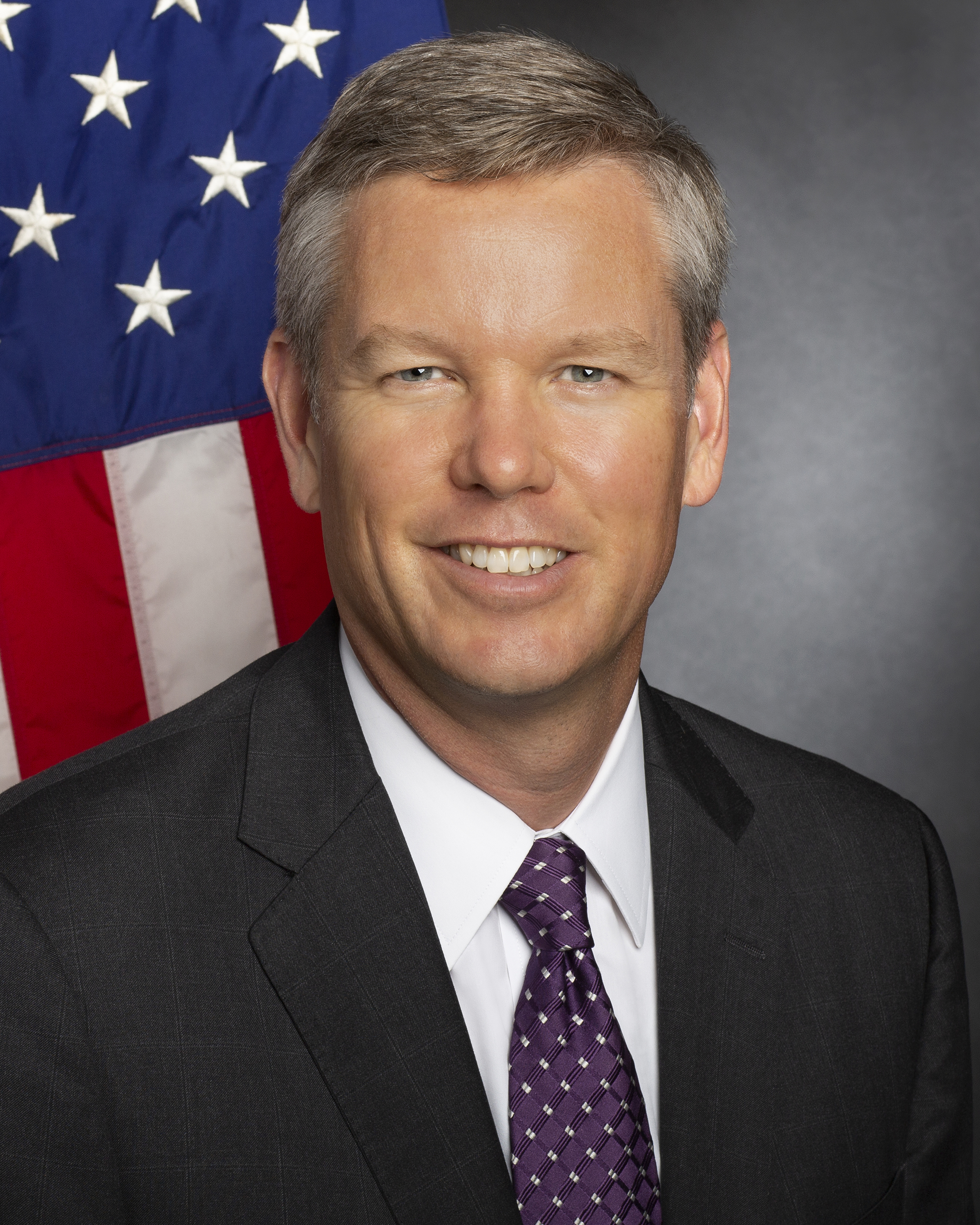
- Hanson in 2020

18th Chair of the Nuclear Regulatory Commission
- In office January 20, 2021 – January 20, 2025
- President: Joe Biden
- Preceded by: Kristine Svinicki
- Succeeded by: David A. Wright

Member of the Nuclear Regulatory Commission
- In office June 8, 2020 – June 13, 2025
- President: Donald Trump; Joe Biden; Donald Trump
- Preceded by: Stephen G. Burns
- Succeeded by: Ho Nieh

Personal details
- Education: Valparaiso University (BA); Yale University (MS, MDiv)

Christopher T. Hanson is an American political staffer and energy consultant who served as the 17th chair of the United States Nuclear Regulatory Commission (NRC) from 2021 to 2025. Hanson served as a member of the commission from 2020 to 2025.

He was sworn as a NRC Commissioner on June 8, 2020. He was previously a staff member on the Senate Appropriations Committee, as well as a Department of Energy official.

Previously he was a consultant at Booz Allen Hamilton, where he led energy projects for government and industry.

President Biden designated Hanson as chairman of the NRC effective January 20, 2021.

He has a master's from Yale Divinity School and Yale School of Forestry and Environmental Studies, and a Bachelor of Arts degree in Religious Studies from Valparaiso University.
