= Annie Caputo =

American government official

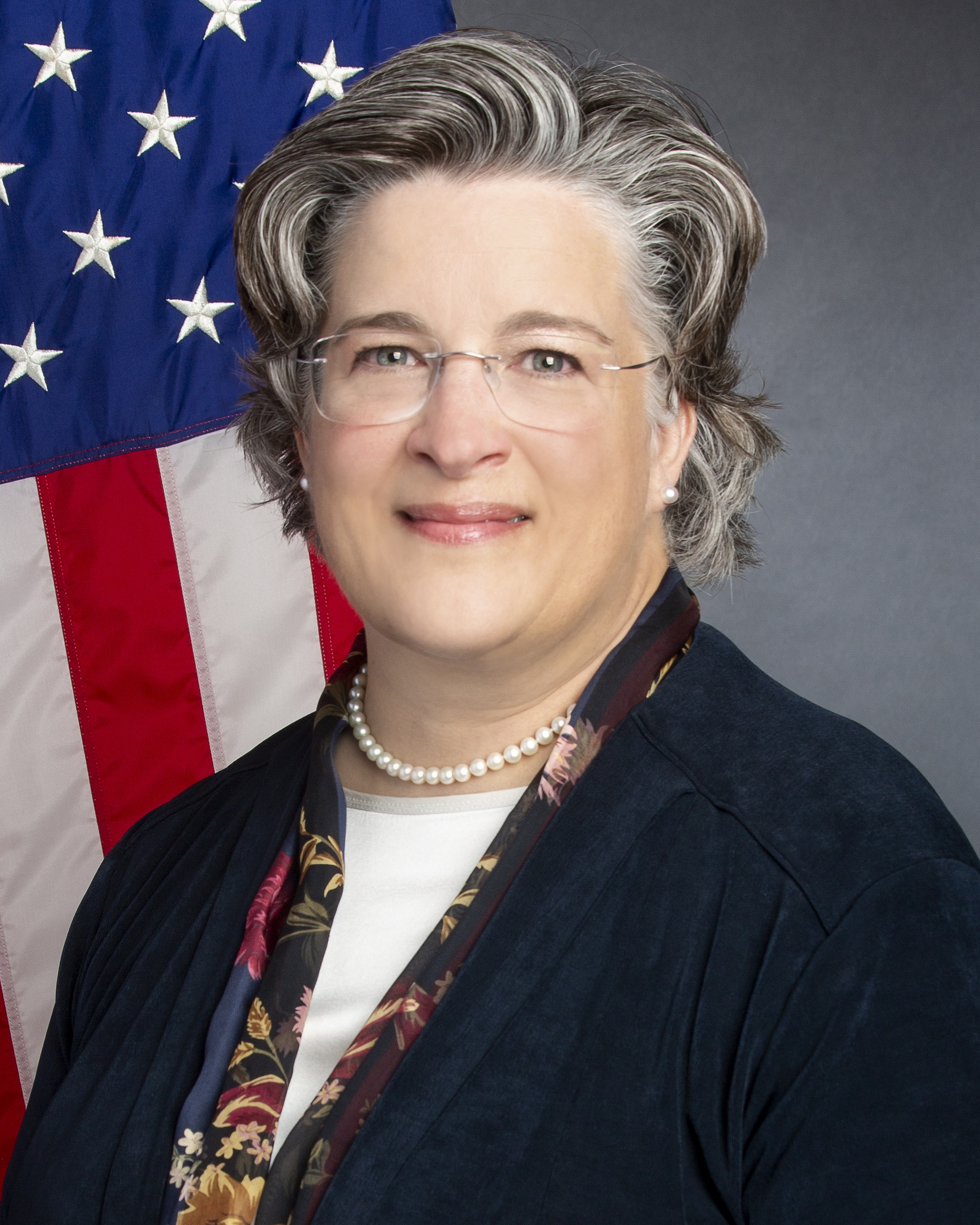

Member of the Nuclear Regulatory Commission
- In office August 9, 2022 – August 1, 2025
- President: Joe Biden; Donald Trump
- Preceded by: Herself
- Succeeded by: Doug W. Weaver
- In office May 29, 2018 – June 30, 2021
- President: Donald Trump; Joe Biden
- Preceded by: William C. Ostendorff
- Succeeded by: Herself

Personal details
- Party: Republican
- Education: University of Wisconsin–Madison (BS)

Annie Caputo is an American political advisor and government official who served as a member of the Nuclear Regulatory Commission. She was initially nominated for the commission by President Donald Trump in May 2017 and was renominated by President Joe Biden in May 2022 after her original term expired on June 30, 2021. She ended her tenure as Commissioner at the end of July 2025, almost a year earlier than it was set to end on June 30 2026. She was formerly a senior policy advisor for Chairman John Barrasso (R-WY) on the United States Senate Committee on Environment and Public Works.

== Career ==
Caputo began her career as an executive assistant and congressional affairs manager for nuclear power plant operator Exelon. From 2005 to 2006 and again from 2012 to 2015, Caputo worked for the United States House Committee on Energy and Commerce, where she handled nuclear energy issues. She has advised the United States House of Representatives, United States Senate, and industry on nuclear energy regulation, policy development, legislation, and communications. She was a senior policy advisor for Jim Inhofe (R-OK) from 2007 to 2012, when he chaired the United States Senate Committee on Environment and Public Works.
