= Bradley Crowell =

American policy advisor

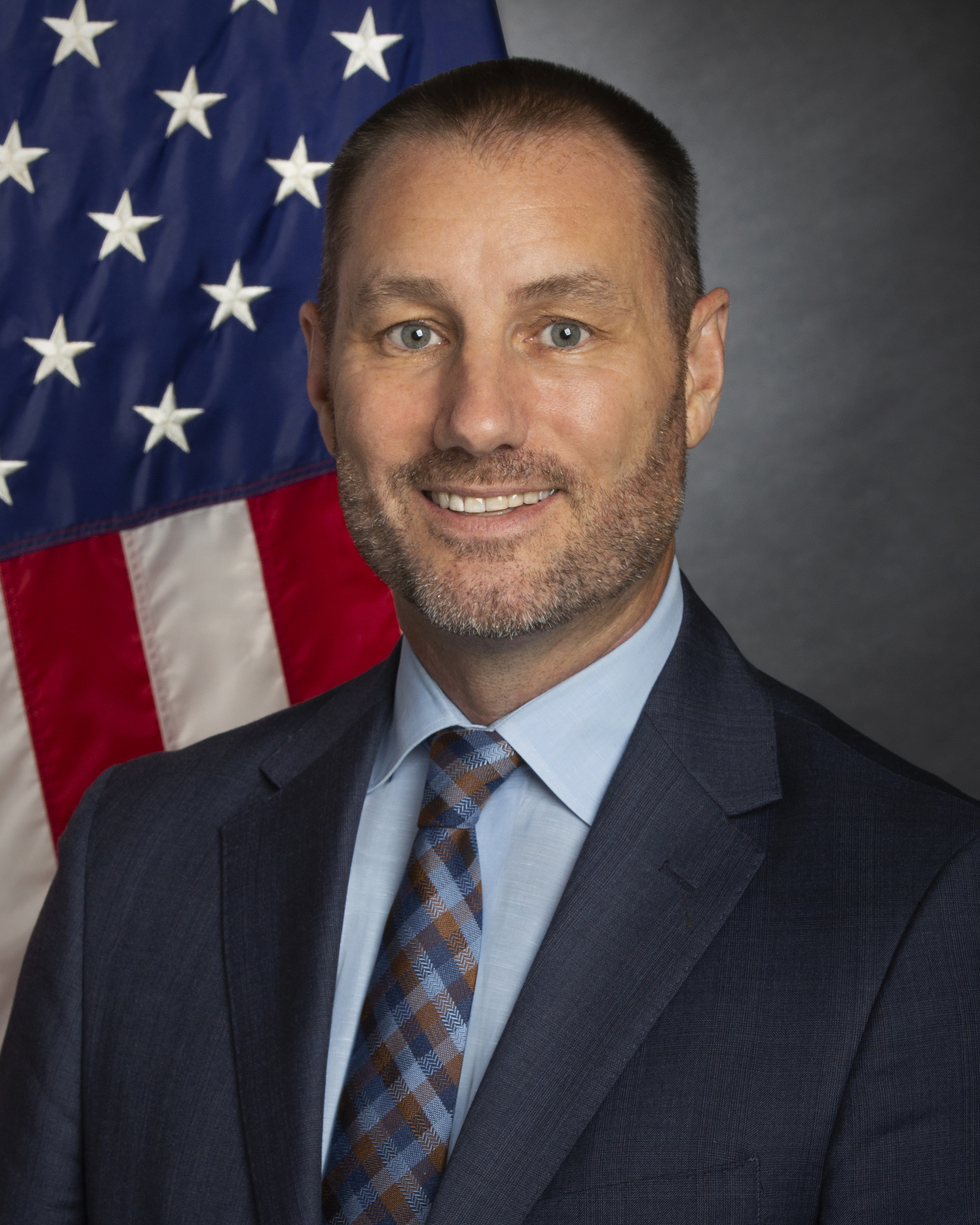

Member of the Nuclear Regulatory Commission
- Incumbent
- Assumed office August 26, 2022
- President: Joe Biden; Donald Trump
- Preceded by: Kristine Svinicki

Director of the Nevada Department of Conservation and Natural Resources
- In office December 2016 – July 2022
- Appointed by: Brian Sandoval
- Preceded by: Leo Drozdoff
- Succeeded by: Jim Lawrence (acting)

Personal details
- Spouse: Rebecca Claypool
- Relations: Bob Crowell (father)
- Children: 1
- Education: Santa Clara University (BS)

Bradley R. Crowell is an American policy advisor and government official who served as director of the Nevada Department of Conservation and Natural Resources. He was confirmed as a member of the Nuclear Regulatory Commission on August 2, 2022, and was sworn in on August 26, 2022.

== Early life and education ==
Crowell is a native of Carson City, Nevada. His father, Bob Crowell, served as mayor of Carson City. He earned a Bachelor of Science degree in political science and government from Santa Clara University.

== Career ==
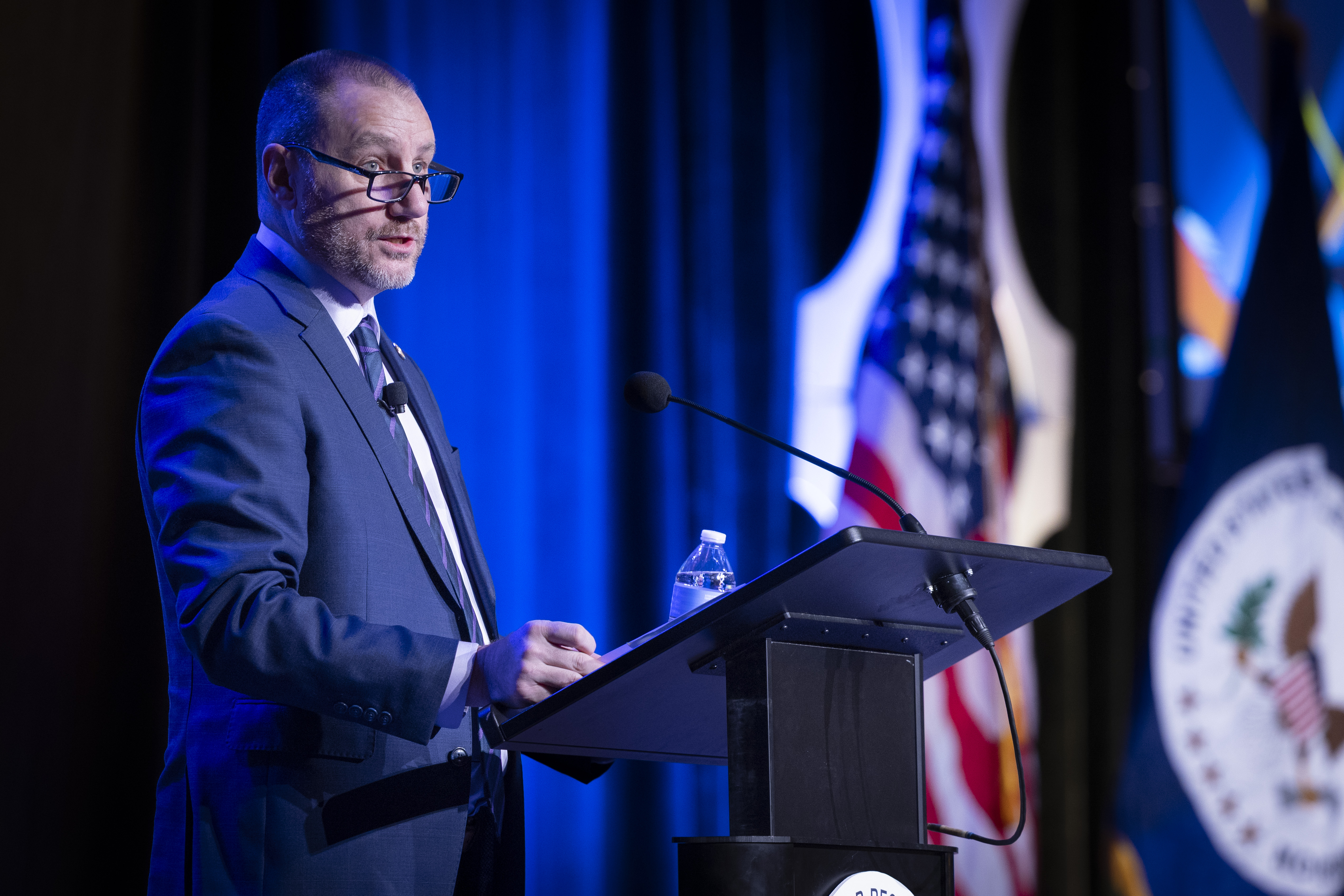
Crowell delivering remarks at the 2025 Nuclear Regulatory Commission Regulatory Information Conference

From 1999 to 2001, Crowell served as a legislative assistant for Senator Richard Bryan. From 2004 to 2007, he was a legislative advocate for the Natural Resources Defense Council. From 2007 to 2010, he served as a senior advisor for Senator Sheldon Whitehouse. Crowell then joined the United States Department of Energy, serving as assistant secretary for the Office of Congressional and Intergovernmental Affairs from 2010 to 2016. In December 2016, Crowell was appointed to serve as director of the Nevada Department of Conservation and Natural Resources by Governor Brian Sandoval. Crowell was reappointed to the post in 2019 by Gov. Steve Sisolak, a Democrat.
