= Ho Nieh =

American nuclear engineer

Ho K. Nieh
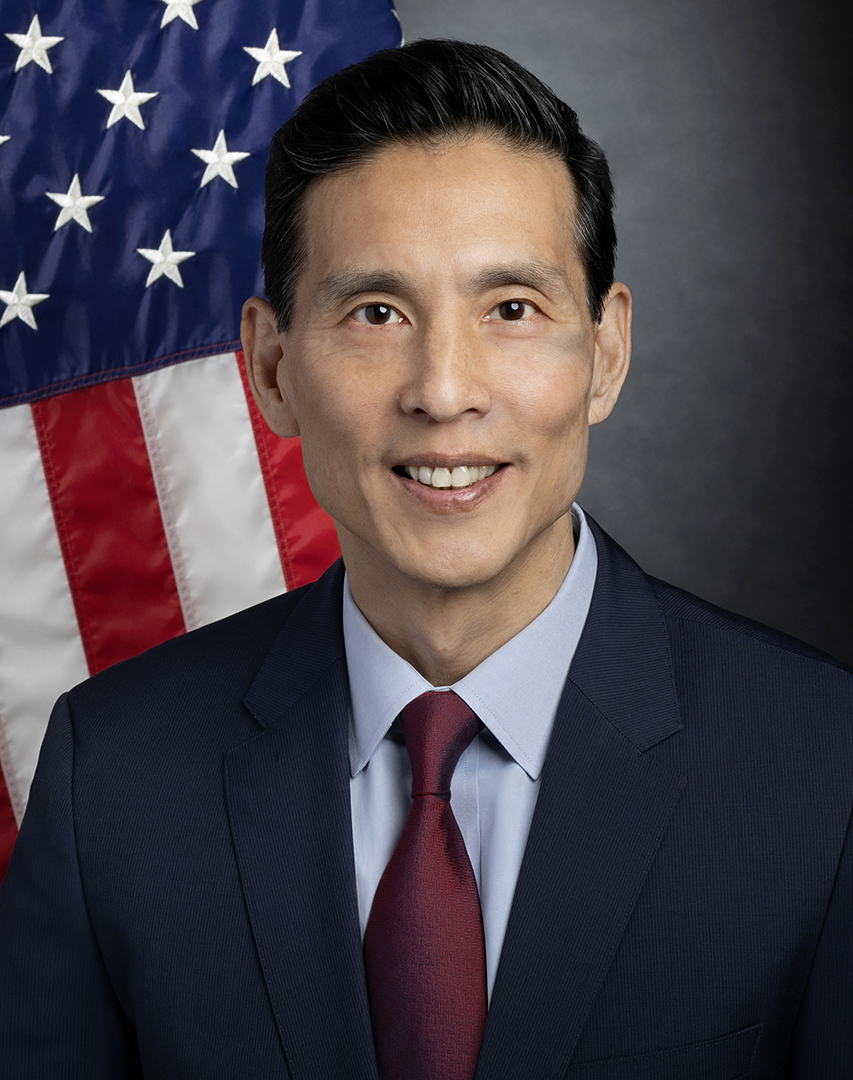
- Nieh in 2025

20th Chair of the Nuclear Regulatory Commission
- Incumbent
- Assumed office January 8, 2026
- President: Donald Trump
- Preceded by: David Wright

Member of the Nuclear Regulatory Commission
- Incumbent
- Assumed office December 4, 2025
- President: Donald Trump
- Preceded by: Christopher Hanson

Personal details
- Party: Republican
- Spouse: Kerry
- Children: 2
- Education: State University of New York Maritime College (BE); Johns Hopkins University (MBA); Rensselaer Polytechnic Institute

Ho K. Nieh is an American nuclear engineer who has served as the 20th chair of the United States Nuclear Regulatory Commission (NRC) since 2026. He has served as a member of the commission since December 2025.

== Early life and education ==
Nieh received a bachelor’s of engineering from the State University of New York Maritime College. He is also a graduate of the Nuclear Power School and attended Rensselaer Polytechnic Institute, as well as earning his masters degree in business administration from Johns Hopkins University.

== Career ==
Nieh began working as an inspector for the Nuclear Regulatory Commission in 1997, before being appointed NEA Head of the Division of Nuclear Safety Regulation and Technology in 2015. He also served as Communications Advisor to the International Atomic Energy Agency and worked at Knolls Atomic Power Laboratory as a civilian instructor for the Navy’s Nuclear Power Program. He joined Southern Nuclear in March 2021 as Vice President of Regulatory Affairs.

In July 2025, President Donald Trump appointed Nieh to serve on the Nuclear Regulatory Commission. This appointment created a Republican majority on the commission. He was confirmed by the United States Senate on November 19, 2025, in a 66–32 vote and was sworn in on December 4. He was appointed as chair on January 8, 2026. Immediately prior to this appointment, Chairman Nieh served as an officer of Southern Nuclear on loan to the Institute of Nuclear Power Operations.

== Personal life ==
Nieh and his wife Kerry have two daughters together. He is a Republican.
