= Regions of the Nuclear Regulatory Commission =

List of nuclear plants in the United States

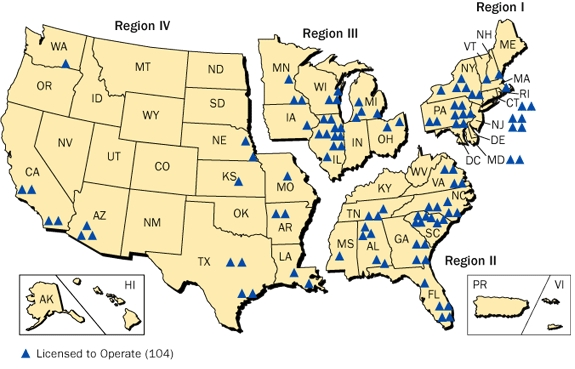
NRC regions and locations of nuclear reactors, 2008

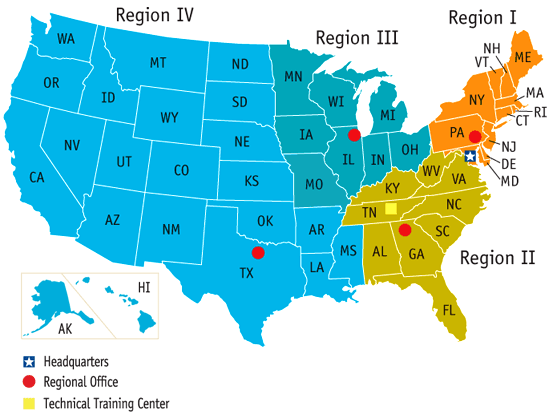
Map of the NRC Regions

The Nuclear Regulatory Commission has divided the US territory into four regions:

| Region | Regional Office | Location | Reactors | NPP sites |
|---|---|---|---|---|
| Region I | King of Prussia, Pennsylvania | North-east | 25 | 16 |
| Region II | Atlanta, Georgia | South-east | 33 | 17 |
| Region III | Naperville, Illinois | Northern mid-west | 23 | 15 |
| Region IV | Arlington, Texas | Southern midwest and west | 19 | 13 |
| Total | | | 100 | 61 |

== Tasks ==
These four regions oversee the operation of 104 power-producing reactors, and 36 non-power-producing reactors. This oversight is done on several levels, for example:

- Each power-producing reactor site has Resident Inspectors, who monitor day-to-day operations
- Numerous special inspection teams, with many different specialties, routinely conduct inspections at each site
- Whistleblower reports are investigated by the Office of Enforcement, specifically the Allegations branch

== Region I ==
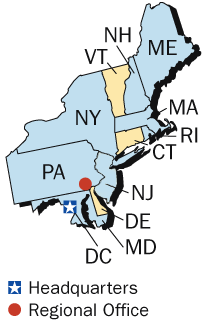
Map of Region I

Headquartered in King of Prussia, Pennsylvania, Region I oversees 15 plants in the north-eastern United States.

=== Connecticut ===
- Millstone Nuclear Power Plant in Waterford

=== Maryland ===
- Calvert Cliffs Nuclear Power Plant in Lusby

=== Massachusetts ===
- Pilgrim Nuclear Generating Station in Manomet

=== New Hampshire ===
- Seabrook Station Nuclear Power Plant in Seabrook

=== New Jersey ===
- Hope Creek Nuclear Generating Station in Lower Alloways Creek Township
- Oyster Creek Nuclear Generating Station in Forked River
- Salem Nuclear Power Plant in Lower Alloways Creek Township

=== New York ===
- Ginna Nuclear Generating Station in Ontario
- Nine Mile Point Nuclear Generating Station in Scriba
- James A. FitzPatrick Nuclear Power Plant in Scriba

=== Pennsylvania ===
- Beaver Valley Nuclear Generating Station near Shippingport
- Limerick Nuclear Power Plant in Limerick Township, Montgomery County
- Peach Bottom Nuclear Generating Station in Peach Bottom Township, York County
- Susquehanna Steam Electric Station in Salem Township
- Three Mile Island Nuclear Generating Station near Harrisburg

== Region II ==
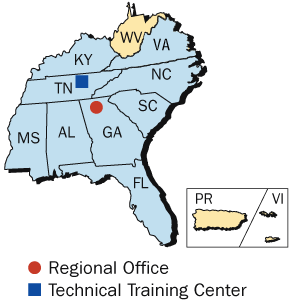
Map of Region II

Headquartered in Atlanta, Georgia, Region II oversees 18 plants in the south-eastern United States.

=== Alabama ===
- Bellefonte Nuclear Generating Station in Hollywood
- Browns Ferry Nuclear Power Plant near Decatur and Athens
- Joseph M. Farley Nuclear Generating Station near Dothan

=== Florida ===
- St. Lucie Nuclear Power Plant near Ft. Pierce
- Turkey Point Nuclear Generating Station near Homestead

=== Georgia ===
- Edwin I. Hatch Nuclear Power Plant near Baxley
- Vogtle Electric Generating Plant near Augusta and Waynesboro

=== North Carolina ===
- Brunswick Nuclear Generating Station near Southport
- McGuire Nuclear Station near Charlotte
- Shearon Harris Nuclear Power Plant in New Hill

=== South Carolina ===
- Catawba Nuclear Station near York
- Oconee Nuclear Station in Seneca
- H. B. Robinson Nuclear Generating Station near Hartsville
- Virgil C. Summer Nuclear Generating Station near Winnsboro

=== Tennessee ===
- Sequoyah Nuclear Generating Station near Soddy-Daisy
- Watts Bar Nuclear Generating Station near Spring City

=== Virginia ===
- North Anna Nuclear Generating Station near Louisa
- Surry Nuclear Power Plant near Surry

== Region III ==
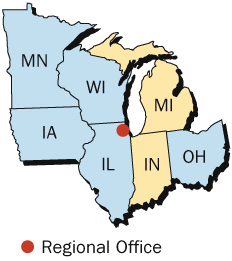
Map of Region III

Headquartered in Naperville, Illinois, Region III oversees 15 plants in the northern mid-western United States.

=== Illinois ===
- Braidwood Nuclear Generating Station in Will County
- Byron Nuclear Generating Station near Byron
- Clinton Nuclear Generating Station near Clinton
- Dresden Nuclear Power Plant in Morris
- LaSalle County Nuclear Generating Station near Ottawa
- Quad Cities Nuclear Generating Station near Cordova

=== Iowa ===
- Duane Arnold Energy Center near Palo

=== Michigan ===
- Donald C. Cook Nuclear Generating Station in Bridgman
- Enrico Fermi Nuclear Generating Station near Monroe
- Palisades Nuclear Generating Station near South Haven

=== Minnesota ===
- Monticello Nuclear Generating Plant near Monticello
- Prairie Island Nuclear Power Plant in Red Wing

=== Ohio ===
- Davis-Besse Nuclear Power Station near Oak Harbor
- Perry Nuclear Generating Station in North Perry

=== Wisconsin ===
- Point Beach Nuclear Generating Station near Two Rivers

== Region IV ==
Headquartered in Arlington, Texas, Region IV oversees 12 plants in the southern midwestern and the western United States.

=== Arizona ===
- Palo Verde Nuclear Generating Station in Tonopah

=== Arkansas ===
- Arkansas Nuclear One in Russellville

=== California ===
- Diablo Canyon Power Plant in Avila Beach
- San Onofre Nuclear Generating Station in San Diego County (in process of becoming decommissioned)

=== Kansas ===
- Wolf Creek Nuclear Generating Station in Burlington

=== Louisiana ===
- River Bend Nuclear Generating Station in St. Francisville
- Waterford Nuclear Generating Station near Hahnville

=== Mississippi ===
- Grand Gulf Nuclear Generating Station near Port Gibson

=== Missouri ===
- Callaway Nuclear Generating Station near Fulton

=== Nebraska ===
- Cooper Nuclear Station near Brownville

=== Texas ===
- Comanche Peak Nuclear Generating Station near Glen Rose
- South Texas Nuclear Generating Station near Bay City

=== Washington ===
- Columbia Generating Station near Richland

== Former regions ==
The NRC previously had five regions. Region V was headquartered in Walnut Creek, California and was responsible for activities in the seven far-west states: Alaska, Arizona, California, Hawaii, Nevada, Oregon and Washington. The NRC decided in September 1993 to consolidate Regions IV and V into a single Region headquartered in Arlington, Texas. On April 4, 1994, NRC Region V was abolished, and the NRC Region IV office in Arlington, Texas was given expanded responsibilities to include the seven states formerly governed by Region V. The former NRC Region V office in Walnut Creek remained open as the redesignated Walnut Creek Field Office, supporting resident inspection activities at power plants in the Pacific states of Washington, Oregon and California until October 1, 1998, when the Walnut Creek Field Office was abolished to further reduce costs.
