= Allison Macfarlane =

American geologist (born c. 1964)

Allison M. Macfarlane
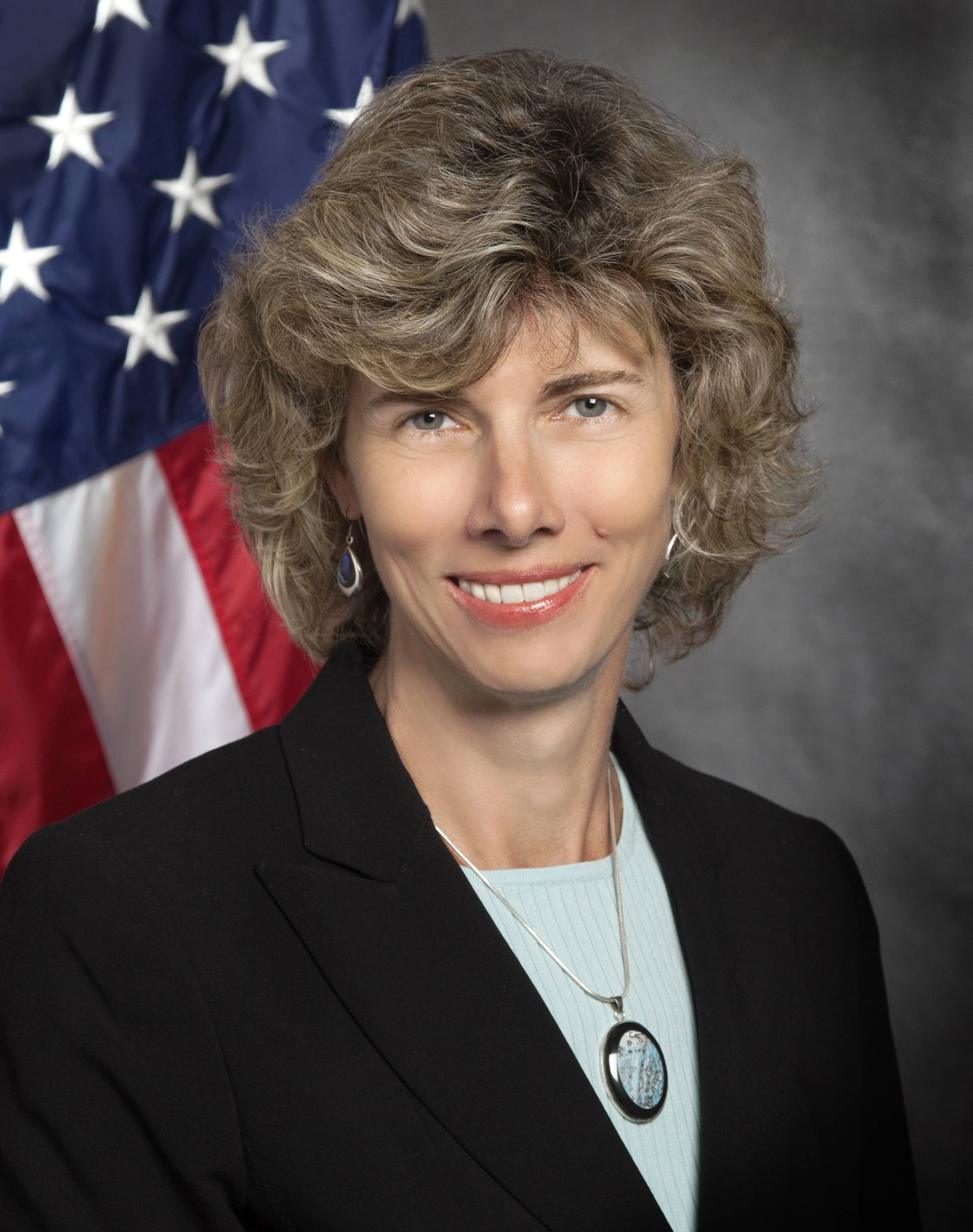
- Macfarlane in 2012

14th Chair of the Nuclear Regulatory Commission
- In office July 9, 2012 – December 31, 2014
- President: Barack Obama
- Preceded by: Gregory Jaczko
- Succeeded by: Stephen G. Burns

Personal details
- Born: circa 1964
- Education: University of Rochester; Massachusetts Institute of Technology

Allison M. Macfarlane directs the School of Public Policy and Global Affairs at the University of British Columbia. She is the former director of the Institute for International Science and Technology Policy at George Washington University, where she was Professor of Science Policy and International Affairs. She is the 14th and former chairman of the United States Nuclear Regulatory Commission (NRC) from July 9, 2012, to December 31, 2014.

== Early life ==
Macfarlane was educated at the University of Rochester, where she earned B.Sc. in Geological Sciences in 1987. At Massachusetts Institute of Technology she earned a Ph.D. in Geology in 1992. She held fellowships at Radcliffe College, Harvard University, Stanford University, and MIT.

== Career ==
She was assistant professor of earth science and international affairs at Georgia Tech from 2003-4. Macfarlane was also an associate professor of environmental science and policy at George Mason University.

While at GMU, Macfarlane was a member of the Blue Ribbon Commission on America's Nuclear Future from 2010 to 2012. The panel was charged by the Secretary of Energy to examine the issues associated with nuclear waste disposal in the United States.

When NRC commission chair Gregory Jaczko was forced to step down in May 2012, Macfarlane was appointed to complete the term. She was confirmed for a full five-year term by the United States Senate on July 1, 2013.

As Chairman of the NRC, Macfarlane prioritized the lessons learned from the North Anna and Fukushima incidents, as well as improving the NRC's communication with public stakeholders and paying more attention to the back end of the fuel cycle in an era when more U.S. nuclear power plants were decommissioned than built.

She also pushed to make the NRC a more family-friendly workplace. She had raised questions a decade earlier about the suitability of the Yucca Mountain site for long-term geologic disposal of high-level nuclear waste. Supporters of Yucca Mountain expected her to stall licensing of Yucca Mountain, but she complied with a court order that ruled her predecessor's actions illegal and directed the NRC to continue its licensing review.

Instead of completing her term at NRC, Macfarlane became the Director of the Institute for International Science and Technology Policy and a Professor of science policy and international affairs at Elliott School of International Affairs at George Washington University in December 2014. She has written 10+ articles for the Bulletin of the Atomic Scientists.

== Views ==
In her 2006 book, Uncertainty Underground, Macfarlane criticized plans to store spent nuclear fuel in Yucca Mountain. Macfarlane supported storing nuclear waste at reactor sites as a temporary measure while finding a permanent underground repository that was more geologically stable and had local public support. She argued that starting the waste in dry casks is a proven method on this shorter time scale, reduces radioactivity before transport, and provides time for analyzing and comparing alternative sites. She also described how seismic and volcanic activity as well as oxidation of casks would make the nuclear waste unstable over a longer time frame.

== Works ==
- "Déjà vu for U.S. nuclear waste". Science. 30 June 2017
- Uncertainty Underground: Yucca Mountain and the Nation's High Level Nuclear Waste, MIT Press, 2006. ISBN 978-0-2626-3332-1

== Personal life ==
Macfarlane is married to Hugh Gusterson, a professor of anthropology and author of works on nuclear culture, with whom she has two children.
