= Colorado River Commission of Nevada =

State agency in Nevada, United States

The Colorado River Commission of Nevada is a Nevada executive-level state agency that regulates and manages the usage of the Colorado River on behalf of Nevada. The agency is headed by an appointed commissioner, and the position is currently occupied by Puoy K. Premsirut. It is headquartered in Las Vegas, Nevada.

== History ==
The Colorado River Commission has been in existence since 1935. The board originally had five members. In 1967, the Director of the Department of Conservation and Natural Resources ceased to have a position on the board, though the number of the board members stayed the same. There was a restriction on political affiliations in 1977, with no more than three members allowed to be associated with the same political party.

== Structure ==
The commission consists of both the board of commissioners and the staff. The board of commission consists of seven members, with four appointed by the Governor of Nevada and three chosen by the Southern Nevada Water Authority. The chair of the commissioner is chosen by the Governor of Nevada.

As for the staff, the highest authority position is an executive director, who is selected by the board of commissioners. Several divisions exist within the structure, such as the Natural Resources Division, the Hydropower Division, and the Energy Operations Division.

== See also ==
- Colorado River Board of California
- Colorado River Compact
