= Simon F. Rothschild =

American merchant (1861–1936)

Simon Frank Rothschild
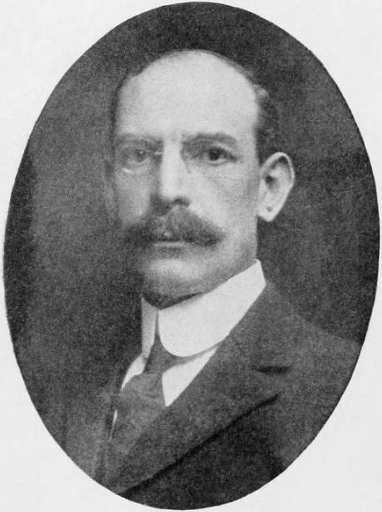
- Born: June 14, 1861; Eufaula, Alabama, U.S.
- Died: January 5, 1936 (aged 74); Manhattan, New York, U.S.
- Education: B.A. College of the City of New York
- Occupation: Merchant
- Known for: President and chairman of the board at Abraham & Straus
- Spouse: Lillian Abraham
- Children: 2
- Family: Louis F. Rothschild (brother); Abraham Abraham (father-in-law); Ida Blun Straus (aunt); Isidor Straus (uncle)

Simon Frank Rothschild (June 14, 1861 – January 5, 1936) was an American merchant and philanthropist who served as president and chairman of the board at Abraham & Straus.

== Biography ==
Rothschild was born on June 14, 1861, in Eufaula, Alabama, the son of Amanda (née Blun / Blün) and Frank Rothschild. He spent most of his childhood in Columbus, Georgia. His grandfather, Nathan Blun, was a prosperous merchant in New York City and Rothschild's family moved to Manhattan in the 1870s. Rothschild attended P.S. 35, the Packard School of Business, and then graduated with a degree in business from the College of the City of New York. In 1878, he went to work at his grandfather's manufacturing business and in 1887, he founded S.F. & A. Rothschild with his brother.

On April 1, 1893, Rothschild in partnership with Nathan Straus and Isidor Straus (who was married to Rothschild's aunt, Ida Blun Straus), bought out Joseph Wechsler's interest in Wechsler & Abraham, co-founded by Rothschild's father-in-law Abraham Abraham, and changed the store's name to Abraham & Straus. The Straus' family provided most of the financing for the transaction as they were flush with cash after their acquisition of a general partnership with Macy's department stores in 1888. Abraham's son, Lawrence Abraham, and son-in-law, Edward Charles Blum, also joined the partnership. Rothschild become vice president in 1920, president in 1925, and chairman of the board in 1930. In 1928, while president, Rothschild began a $7.8 million expansion of the Fulton Street store which opened on October 10, just days before the Wall Street Crash of 1929. Also in 1929, Rothschild presided over the merger of Abraham & Straus with Filene's, Lazarus, and Bloomingdale's to form Federated Department Stores. In order to preserve jobs during the Depression, all Abraham & Straus employees took a 10% pay cut; as a result, no employees were laid off. Abraham served as chairman until his death in 1936.

== Philanthropy and board memberships ==
Rothschild served as president of the Hebrew Educational Society from 1903 to 1908, head of the Hebrew Orphan Asylum of New York from 1908 to 1912, vice-president of the Brooklyn Federation of Jewish Charities and the Brooklyn Council of the Boy Scouts of America; and served as director of the Brooklyn Bureau of Charities, the Society for the Prevention of Cruelty to Children, the Jewish Hospital, and the Brooklyn Academy of Music. He was a member of the Brooklyn Chamber of Commerce and the New York State Chamber of Commerce. He served as director of the Associated Merchandising Corporation and the Retail Research Association, and chairman of the New York Retail Drygoods Association. He was a member of the Harmonie Club.

== Personal life ==
In 1890, he married Lillian Abraham, daughter of Abraham Abraham. They had two children, Walter Nathan Rothschild (1892–1960) and Howard Frank Rothschild (1899–1919). His son Howard died of pneumonia in 1919. Rothschild died of a heart attack on January 5, 1936, at his home in Manhattan. Services were held at Temple Emanu-El in Manhattan. He was interred at the Salem Fields Cemetery. His son Walter married Carola Warburg (1896–1987), daughter of Felix Warburg and granddaughter of Jacob Schiff. His great-grandson (through his son Walter) is Peter A. Bradford, the husband of Katherine Bradford and father of Arthur Bradford.
