= 6 Days to Air =

2011 documentary television film directed by Arthur Bradford

- Also known as: 6 Days to Air: The Making of South Park
- Directed by: Arthur Bradford
- Starring: Trey Parker; Matt Stone; Anne Garefino; Vernon Chatman; Bill Hader; Frank C. Agnone II
- Theme music composer: Joe Wong; Didier Leplae
- Country of origin: United States
- Original language: English

Production
- Producers: Arthur Bradford; Jennifer Ollman
- Editors: Chad Beck; Bret Granato
- Running time: 42 minutes
- Production company: Comedy Partners

Original release
- Network: Comedy Central
- Release: October 9, 2011

6 Days to Air: The Making of South Park (simply known as 6 Days to Air) is a 2011 American documentary television film directed by Arthur Bradford that details the production process of the American adult animated sitcom South Park. The film follows the show's hectic, rushed six-day production schedule, in which a 22-minute episode is completed just hours before its original air date.

The film premiered on October 9, 2011, on Comedy Central, and received positive reviews from critics. The documentary was nominated for an Emmy Award in the Outstanding Nonfiction Special category.

== Synopsis ==
The film opens as South Park creators Trey Parker and Matt Stone leave New York City and the 2011 opening night of their Broadway production The Book of Mormon to return to Los Angeles to begin the fifteenth season of South Park. The documentary chronicles the production of the season premiere, "HumancentiPad", beginning the Thursday prior to airing. Parker and Stone, alongside producers Anne Garefino, Vernon Chatman, Bill Hader, and Susan Arneson, discuss ideas for the episode. Parker mentions his annoyance with downloading the latest version of iTunes, and being forced to comply with the software's long list of terms and conditions. The rant leads to ideas, with Parker instructing the storyboard team on how to stage a shot. The film covers various aspects of production, including voice acting, animation, lip sync, communication with standards and practices, character design, and editing.

By the next Tuesday, one day before airing, the staff are preparing for their ritual all-nighter, with Parker and Stone still involved in crafting the episode's plot, and the former still crafting its unfinished script. The episode is completed the following morning just after 7am, with audio and picture lock lasting until the afternoon, after which supervising producer Frank C. Agnone II takes the master tape to a nearby uplink facility, where it is sent to Comedy Central in New York hours before it airs nationwide.

== Production ==
Bradford was friends with the duo for nearly 17 years prior, and they had worked together on the program How's Your News?. Stone initially declined Bradford's suggestion of documenting the South Park production process, as they disliked having cameras in the studio, among other reasons. Bradford became involved when they later requested he film a documentary based on The Book of Mormon. That documentary "ended up not working out," and, combined with the fifteenth anniversary of South Park, "things kind of aligned at that point." Bradford was a fan of the show prior, and felt a license to ask harder questions behind the camera than he would with the duo personally.

== Reception ==
6 Days to Air received positive reviews. Ramsey Isler of IGN wrote that "the greatest success of this documentary is that it gives a personal look inside the bizarre professional lives of two of the entertainment industry's most successful creatives." Neil Genzlinger of The New York Times opined that "There are almost as many laughs in [the documentary] as there are in an actual episode of South Park." "You have to admire the intense work ethic driving the show's breakneck production cycle," said Harry Sawyers of Gizmodo. "The story of this single episode's genesis will resonate with anyone who has worked on a team accustomed to long hours and a relentless pace." Phil Dyess-Nugent of The A.V. Club was positive in his assessment of the special, noting, "As they stress out and cocoon in their offices and forget what combs are for, you realize how much they must love what they're doing, because nobody would do this just for the money, so long as they already had carfare back home."

The film was nominated for an Emmy Award in the Outstanding Nonfiction Special category.
