= Planthouse =

Art gallery in Manhattan, New York

Coordinates: 40.746045°N 73.990098°W

Planthouse is a contemporary gallery and project space located in New York City, in the United States committed to publishing emerging and established artists. Planthouse publications are in the collections of The Metropolitan Museum of Art, and the Beinecke Rare Book & Manuscript Library.

== History ==
Planthouse was founded in 2013 in a former flower shop by Katie Michel. The gallery took its namesake from its location in New York City's flower district. In 2015, Planthouse moved to West 28th street between Broadway and 6th Avenue, known formally as Tin Pan Alley, which historically housed the city’s music publishers in the early twentieth century. In 2025, Planthouse moved to its current location at 526 W 26th Street, Suite 416, in the heart of Chelsea's gallery district.

== Artist collaborations ==
The Floral Ghost (2016), Susan Orlean, Philip Taaffe

Giraffe (2016), Katherine Bradford

43 Monsters (2014), Arthur Bradford, Chuck Webster

The Floral Ghost Print Portfolio (2014), Simryn Gill, Florian Meisenberg, Katia Santibañez, Philip Taaffe, Fred Tomaselli, Anton Würth
