= Donald B. Straus =

Donald Blun Straus
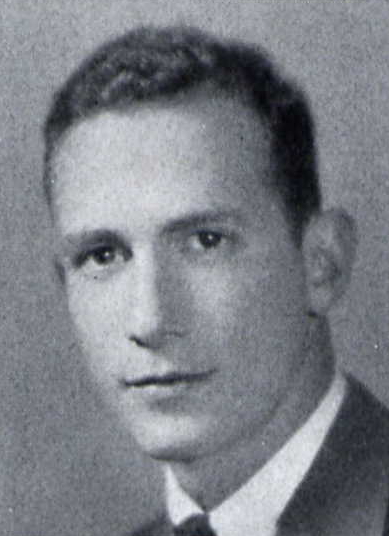
- Straus in the Harvard University yearbook, 1938
- Born: June 28, 1916; Middletown, New Jersey
- Died: September 3, 2007 (aged 91); Mount Desert, Maine
- Education: A.B. and M.B.A. Harvard University
- Spouse: Elizabeth Allen
- Children: 3
- Parent(s): Edith Abraham Straus; Percy Selden Straus
- Family: Straus family Isidor Straus (grandfather); Ida Straus (grandmother); Abraham Abraham (grandfather)

Donald Blun Straus (June 28, 1916 – September 3, 2007) was an American educator and an executive in public service. Straus, who held A.B. and M.B.A. degrees from Harvard University, served as president of the American Arbitration Association, executive vice president of the Health Insurance Plan of Greater New York, chair of the Planned Parenthood Federation of America, and a trustee of the Carnegie Endowment for International Peace and the Institute for Advanced Study. An early advocate of online education and public referendums via computers and the Web, he taught an online course in "Democracy in the 21st Century" for Connected Education in the late-1980s and early-1990s. He served as faculty associate and was a life trustee at the College of the Atlantic in Maine.

== Biography ==
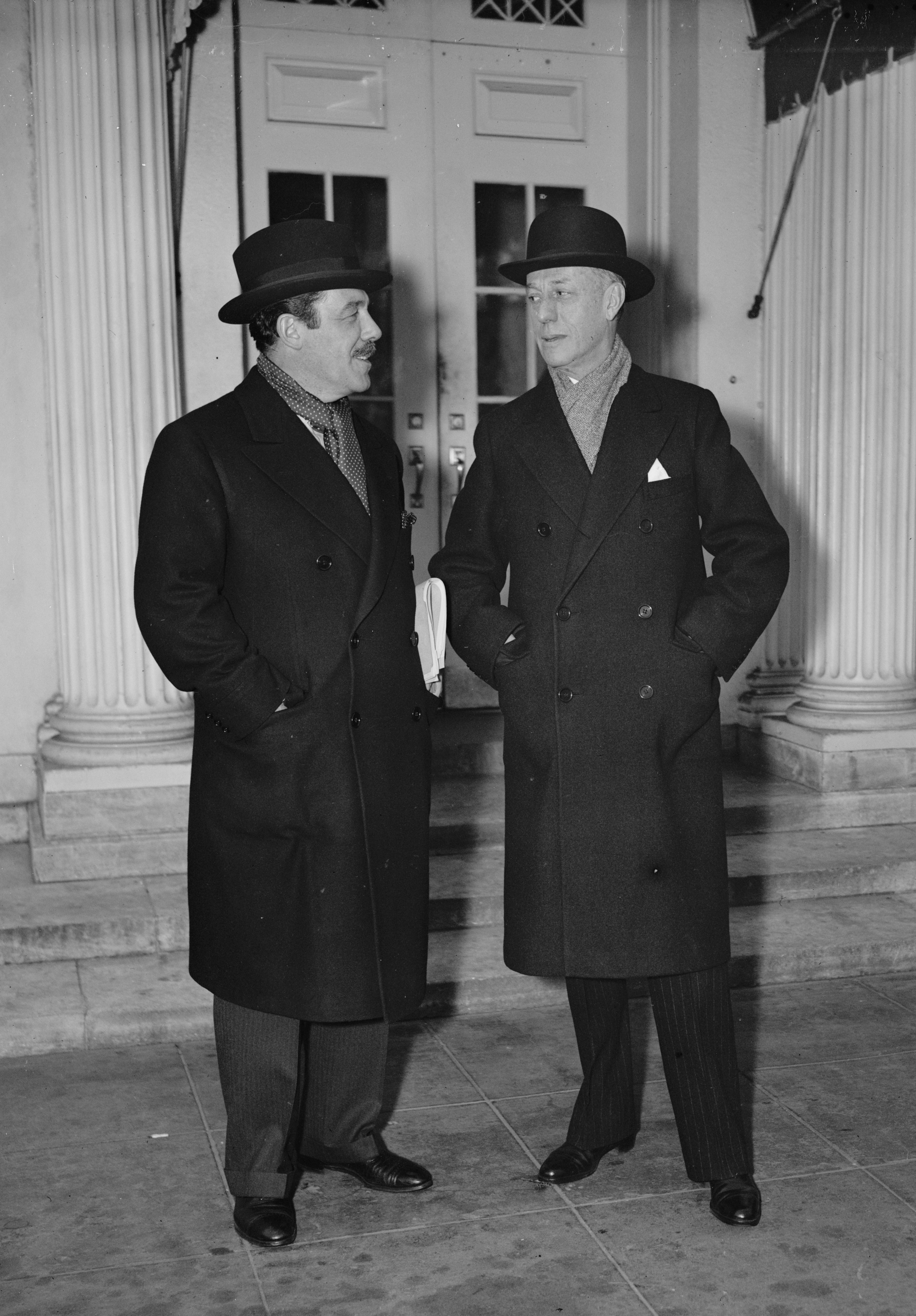
Straus's father Percy (right) in Washington, D.C., 1937

Straus was born in Middletown, New Jersey, the son of Edith (née Abraham) and Percy Selden Straus. His paternal grandparents — Ida and Isidor Straus — died on the Titanic, allowing others to take their place on the lifeboats. Isidor was a co-founder of Macy's department store in New York City, and Percy — Donald's father — was President of the landmark New York store. His maternal grandfather was retailing magnate Abraham Abraham, founder of Abraham & Straus department store.

Straus married Elizabeth Allen in 1940; they had three children: David Allen Straus, Robert Beckwith Straus, and Sara Straus Byruck. Straus died in Mount Desert, Maine.
