= Criminal Justice: A Brief Introduction =

2002 book by Frank Schmalleger

- Second edition (1997)
- Author: Frank Schmalleger
- Language: English
- Genre: Non-fiction
- Publisher: Jeff Johnston
- Publication date: 2002

Criminal Justice: A Brief Introduction is a book written by Frank Schmalleger. It is intended to serve as an introductory text in the study of the American criminal justice system. The text is printed by Prentice Hall and Pearson Education. The publisher is Jeff Johnston.

Schmalleger states, "Criminal justice is a dynamic and fluid field of study. As accelerated change engulfs American society, it is appropriate that a streamlined and up-to-date book be in the hands of students. The information age and all that it has wrought is here..."

Schmalleger adds, "It is my hope that the technological and publishing revolutions will combine with growing social awareness to facilitate needed changes in our system; and will supplant self-serving system-perpetuated injustices with new standards of equity, compassion, understanding, fairness, and justice for all."
