= Connected Education =

Former online education organization

Connected Education - also known as Connect Ed - was a pioneering online education organization founded and administered by Paul Levinson and Tina Vozick. Operating from 1985 to 1997, Connect Ed offered the M.A. degrees in Media Studies (through The New School in New York City) and Creative Writing (through the Bath College of Higher Education in England). Connect Ed also worked with Polytechnic University in Brooklyn and Pacific Oaks College in Pasadena, California.

Technical services were provided by the New Jersey Institute of Technology on their "Electronic Information Exchange System" (known as "EIES") administered by Murray Turoff and Starr Roxanne Hiltz, and by the Unison Participate system. In an age before easy dissemination of images and sounds on the Web, Connect Ed classes were conducted entirely in text. Features of the electronic campus included the "Connect Ed Cafe," for casual conversation; an online book ordering service; the "Connect Ed Library"; and an e-text publishing arm, "Connected Editions". Courses included "Computer Conferencing for Business and Education," "Artificial Intelligence and Real Life," "Ethics in the Technological Age," "Science Fiction and Space-Age Mythology," "Popular Culture and the Media", "Book Publishing for the 21st Century," "Technological Forecasting," "Philosophy and Technology," and "Technology and the Disabled".

Students were enrolled in online classes from 40 states in the United States and 20 countries around the world. Faculty and special lecturers included Michael A. Banks, Gregory Benford, William Benzon, Harlan Cleveland, Ari Davidow, Sylvia Engdahl, Keith Ferrell, David Gaines (who taught the first online graduate music course), David Gerrold, Tom Hargadon, David G. Hays, Michael R. Heim, Nicholas Johnson, Lionel Kearns, Paul Levinson, Brock N. Meeks, Frank Schmalleger, J. Neil Schulman, Rusty Schweickart, Donald B. Straus, Gail S. Thomas, and Harvey Wheeler among others.
