= Michael R. Heim =

American philosopher (born 1944)

Michael Heim
- Born: 1944 (age 81–82); California
- Occupations: Author, teacher

Michael R. Heim is an American author and educator. Known as "the philosopher of cyberspace", Heim's three scholarly books - Electric Language: A Philosophical Study of Word Processing (Yale University Press, 1986), The Metaphysics of Virtual Reality (Oxford University Press, 1993), and Virtual Realism (Oxford University Press, 1998) - have been translated into Chinese, Japanese, and Korean. His shorter works include:

Heim, M. (1995). The design of virtual reality. Body & Society, 1(3-4), 65-77, Virtual Reality Wave 3, Chapter 13, Pages 261-277, in the book Boundaries of Self and Reality Online, Editor(s): Jayne Gackenbach, Johnathan Bown, Academic Press, 2017

Heim, Michael R.: Bridging Real and Virtual: A Spiritual Challenge. In: Journal for Religion, Film and Media, Jg. 3 (2017), Nr. 1, S. 159-181. DOI: http://dx.doi.org/10.25969/mediarep/19455.

He taught at Missouri Western University in the 1980s, was an online lecturer for Connected Education in the mid-1980s, and taught at the Art Center College of Design in Pasadena, California, 1995–2002. Heim is currently a lecturer at the University of California, Irvine.
