= SOS: The San Onofre Syndrome =

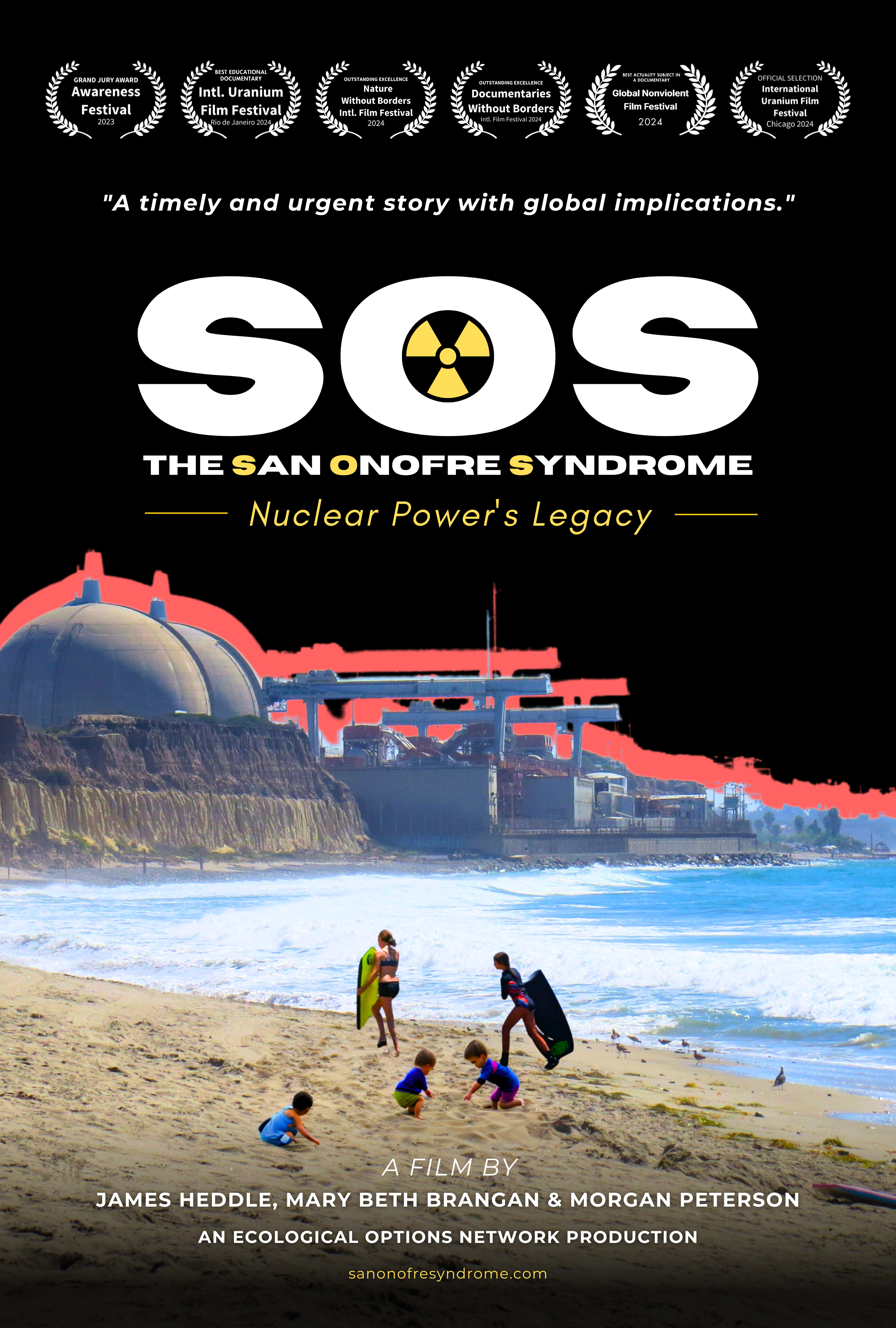
- Directed by: James Heddle; Mary Beth Brangan; Morgan Peterson
- Produced by: Mary Beth Brangan
- Cinematography: James Heddle
- Edited by: Morgan Peterson
- Music by: Christopher Hedge
- Animation by: TheBureau.tv
- Production company: Ecological Options Network
- Release date: 2023
- Running time: 97 minutes
- Country: United States
- Language: English

SOS - The San Onofre Syndrome: Nuclear Power’s Legacy is a documentary film that investigates the management of radioactive waste at the San Onofre Nuclear Generating Station in California. The film highlights the station´s proximity to the ocean, at only 108 feet from the rising sea, and addresses concerns about the oversight of radioactive materials at nuclear facilities in the United States and beyond. It was directed by James Heddle, Mary Beth Brangan, and Morgan Peterson.

The film has been featured at several cinema festivals and has earned many accolades. It received the Grand Jury Award for Documentary Feature at the 2023 Awareness Film Festival in Los Angeles, California, as well as the Best Educational Documentary Award at the 2024 International Uranium Film Festival in Rio de Janeiro.

== Synopsis ==
SOS: The San Onofre Syndrome delves into the efforts of Southern California residents to address safety concerns about the condition of the San Onofre Nuclear Generating Station, whose final shutdown was in 2013. The film also examines the realization of a new threat: the presence of nuclear waste stored close to the sea, focusing on its long-term radioactivity. SOS is a documentary that raises awareness of the global challenges in nuclear waste management and discusses different approaches to handling these issues. Filmed over 12 years, it includes interviews with residents, activists, engineers, and nuclear energy experts to document public concerns and community responses to the facility.

The film documents Prime Minister Naoto Kan's visit on June 4th, 2013 to San Diego to participate in a panel entitled “Fukushima: Ongoing Lessons for California”. The panel also featured Nuclear Regulatory Commission chairman Gregory Jaczko, former NRC Commissioner Peter A. Bradford, and nuclear engineer Arnie Gundersen, where they discussed topics related to nuclear energy and safety. The producer Mary Beth Brangan stated in an interview that the Fukushima accident catalyzed her and her life partner James Heddle into the making of this film.

== Awards ==
The documentary has been recognized at several international film festivals and has received awards for its impact and social awareness. Notable awards include:

- 2023 - Grand Jury Award For Documentary Feature at the Awareness Film Festival in Los Angeles, California.
- 2024 - Best Educational Documentary Award at the International Uranium Film Festival in Rio de Janeiro, Brazil.
- 2024 - Outstanding Excellence Award for Best Documentary at the Documentaries Without Borders Film Festival.
- 2024 - Outstanding Excellence Award (Environmental) at the Nature Without Borders International Film Festival.
- 2024 - Best Actuality Subject In a Documentary at the Global Nonviolent Film Festival.

== Featured cast ==
The following individuals were featured in the film:

- Gary and Laurie Headrick. Co-founders of San Clemente Green.
- Donna Gilmore. Founder of San Onofre Safety.
- Karen Hadden. Executive Director of the Sustainable Energy and Economic Development Coalition (SEED).
- Rose Gardner. Co-founder of the Alliance for Environmental Strategies.
- Gregory Jaczko. Nuclear Regulatory Commission former chairman.
- S. David Freeman (1926-2020). Presidential Advisor on energy policy. Freeman headed several public utilities companies, most notably the New York Power Authority, the Sacramento Municipal Utility District, and the Los Angeles Department of Water and Power.
- Deanna Polk. Emergency response professional.
- Torgen Johnson. Urban Planner and principal architect at Johnson Design.
- Dan Hirsch. Founder of Committee to Bridge the Gap.
- Gordon Edwards (activist). Nuclear consultant, and president of the Canadian Coalition for Nuclear Responsibility.
- Naoto Kan. Japan's Former Prime Minister during the Fukushima Tsunami.
- Arnie Gundersen. Consulting Nuclear Engineer.
- Dr. Tom English. President of the Earth Restoration Team.
