= Arnold Gundersen =

American nuclear engineer (born 1949)

- Born: Arnold Gundersen; January 4, 1949 (age 77); Elizabeth, New Jersey, U.S.
- Education: Rensselaer Polytechnic Institute (B.S., M.S.)
- Occupations: Nuclear engineer, whistleblower
- Employer: Fairewinds Associates
- Known for: Nuclear safety advocacy, expert witness in nuclear accidents, whistleblower
- Notable work: Expert reports on Fukushima Daiichi nuclear disaster, Vermont Yankee Nuclear Power Plant, Three Mile Island accident
- Title: Chief Engineer
- Website: fairewinds.org

Arnold "Arnie" Gundersen (born January 4, 1949, in Elizabeth, New Jersey) is a former nuclear industry executive and engineer who became a whistleblower in 1990. Gundersen has written dozens of expert reports for nongovernment organizations and the state of Vermont. Gunderson was a licensed reactor operator from 1971-1972 on Rensselaer Polytechnic Institute's zero-power open-pool university research reactor at the Reactor Critical Facility in Schenectady, New York, where he was a nuclear engineering graduate student.

Gundersen questioned the safety of the Westinghouse AP1000, a third-generation nuclear reactor, and has expressed concerns about the operation of the Vermont Yankee Nuclear Power Plant. He served as an expert witness in litigation after the Three Mile Island accident and has provided commentary on the Fukushima Daiichi nuclear disaster.

== Background ==
Gundersen is a graduate of the Rensselaer Polytechnic Institute (1971), with a B.S. cum laude and a GPA of 3.74 in nuclear engineering, holds a master's degree in nuclear engineering, and gained an Atomic Energy Commission Fellowship (1972). Gundersen has more than 40 years of nuclear power engineering experience. Gundersen holds a nuclear safety patent, was a licensed reactor operator, and is a former nuclear industry senior vice president. During his nuclear power industry career, Gundersen also managed and coordinated projects at 70 nuclear power plants in the US.

== Career ==
From 1972 to 1976 Gundersen worked at the Northeast Utilities Service Corporation as a nuclear engineer; and from 1976 to 1979 at New York State Electric & Gas as an engineering supervisor. From 1979 to 1990 Gundersen was employed at Nuclear Energy Services, a Danbury, Connecticut-based consulting firm. Gundersen served as an expert witness in litigation after the 1979 Three Mile Island accident. He was a chapter author for the DOE Decommissioning Handbook, First Edition (1981–82).

In 1990 Gundersen was a senior vice president at Nuclear Energy Services when he discovered radioactive material in an accounting safe. Three weeks after notifying the company president of what he believed to be radiation safety violations, Gundersen was fired. According to The New York Times, for three years, Gundersen was "awakened by harassing phone calls in the middle of the night" and "became concerned about his family's safety". Gundersen believes he was blacklisted, harassed and fired for doing what he thought was right.

While also writing numerous nuclear expert reports from 1993 to 2008, Gundersen was employed at a number of Connecticut schools teaching mathematics and physics; in 2007 he became Mathematics Professor at Community College of Vermont.

Gundersen is chief engineer of Fairewinds Associates, "a paralegal services and expert witness firm", and on the board of directors for Fairewinds Energy Education, a 501c3 non-profit organization.

== Publications ==
“The Lessons of the Fukushima Daiichi Nuclear Accident”, International Symposium on the Truth of Fukushima Nuclear Accident and the Myth of Nuclear Safety, Iwanami Shoten Publishers, University of Tokyo, Japan, August 30, 2012.

“The Echo Chamber: Regulatory Capture and the Fukushima Daiichi Disaster”, Lessons From Fukushima, February 27, 2012, Greenpeace International.

Co-author of Fukushima Daiichi: Truth And The Way Forward, Shueisha Publishing, February 17, 2012, Tokyo, Japan.

Invited chapter author for the DOE Decommissioning Handbook, First Edition, 1981-1982.

== Patents ==
Energy Absorbing Turbine Missile Shield – U.S. Patent # 4,397,608 ¬– September 8, 1983

== Views ==
=== AP1000 ===
In April 2010, Gundersen released a report (commissioned by several nongovernment organizations) which explored a hazard associated with the possible rusting through of the AP1000 containment structure steel liner. In the AP1000 design, the liner and the concrete are separated, and if the steel rusts through, "there is no backup containment behind it" says Gundersen. If the dome rusted through the design would expel radioactive contaminants and the plant "could deliver a dose of radiation to the public that is 10 times higher than the N.R.C. limit" according to Gundersen. Westinghouse has disputed Gundersen’s assessment. Gundersen has testified before the Nuclear Regulatory Commission’s Advisory Committee on Reactor Safeguards saying that "if a hole appeared, the chimney effect would disperse radioactive material far and wide".

=== Vermont Yankee ===
In 2010 Gundersen expressed concerns about the operation of the Vermont Yankee Nuclear Power Plant, saying a leak of radioactive tritium there could be "followed by releases of other, more dangerous materials if the plant keeps operating". The plant ceased operations in 2014 and is currently in the process of nuclear decommissioning.

Gundersen has said that the U.S. nuclear industry and regulators need to reexamine disaster planning and worst-case scenarios, especially in reactors such as Vermont Yankee, which have the same design as the crippled nuclear plant at the center of the 2011 Japanese Fukushima nuclear emergency. He has stated that Vermont Yankee and similar plants are vulnerable to a similar cascade of events as in Japan.

=== Fukushima ===
As part of Fairewinds Energy Education, Gundersen has hosted numerous videos and provided updates about the Fukushima Daiichi nuclear disaster. He was also a regular guest on media outlets such as Democracy Now and CNN discussing the issue. In an interview with Al Jazeera, Gundersen referred to Fukushima as "the biggest industrial catastrophe in the history of mankind".

In September 2013 Gundersen accused the Japanese government of lying in order to secure its position as host of the 2020 Olympic Games when it claimed that the disaster was under control and that there existed no health concerns. The plant, Gundersen said, "is leaking into the Pacific Ocean extensively" and that thyroid cancers, deformed fish and radioactive animals were being discovered.

In early October 2013, Gundersen stated that due to newly discovered leaks and impending tropical storms, the potential existed for a release of radiation 15,000 times that of Hiroshima.

== Other ==
A weeklong series in the December 1992 Cleveland Plain Dealer entitled "Lethal Doses: Radiation That Kills" alleged "extreme medical malpractice" in radiation medicine and accused the Nuclear Regulatory Commission of "serial failings to do anything about it". Runner-up for the Pulitzer Prize in 1993, the Plain Dealer’s five-part series alleged numerous of "misappropriation and sloppiness using nuclear material that led to disfigurement and death". One of the five parts cited Arnie Gundersen who alleged "botched inspections and cozy personal relationships between NRC inspectors and licensees". Two congressional investigations were held in response to this series in order to obtain NRC reform on the matter.

Partial transcript from Federal regulation of medical radiation uses: Hearing before the U. S. Senate Committee on Governmental Affairs,, May 6, 1993, page 22:

Committee Chairman Senator John Glenn: "... what is the NRC doing to assure that Commission employees don't engage in potential conflict of interest practices?"

NRC Chairman Selin: "... it is true. Everything Mr. Gundersen said was absolutely right; he performed quite a service..." [stating that the conflict of interest issue is ] "much more troublesome because, to be frank, it's not just a question of who was paying for the lunches, but why these people were having lunch together in the first place. I mean it was the familiarization and the fraternization that was more worrisome... We are very concerned about this situation. We are sharpening our regulations, but in this case there is no question that the actions happened as described by the IG, people knew or should have known that they should not have done these actions... But that is a very worrisome situation- both of fraternization with the licensees and then the well-meaning but very dangerous practice of recommending people to licensees to help them solve problems."

== See also ==
- List of nuclear whistleblowers

== Presentations and speeches ==
- The Future of Energy: Is Nuclear the Solution? Invited guest speaker in debate against Dr. Jordi Roglans-Ribas (Director of Nuclear Engineering Division at Argonne National Laboratory), held at Northwestern University, April 30, 2015
- Should Nuclear Energy be Expanded to Help Create a More Sustainable Future? Invited guest speaker in Debate at Hofstra University, November 20, 2014
- Radiation Knows No Borders Invited speaker at The Wave Conference, Life Chiropractic West, San Francisco, CA, August 2, 2014.
- Thirty-five Years and Five Meltdowns Later: The Real Lessons of Three Mile Island Keynote Speaker for Three Mile Island at 35 (TMI@35) Symposium at Penn State, Harrisburg, PA, March 28, 2014.
- Speaking Truth to Power, Clarkson University, Potsdam, NY, October 22, 2013.
- Fukushima: Ongoing Lessons for New York, 82nd Street YMCA, New York City, NY, October 8, 2013. Speakers were Arnie Gundersen, Riverkeeper President Paul Galley, Former Japanese Prime Minister Naoto Kan, Former NRC Chair Gregory Jaczko, Former NRC Commissioner Peter A. Bradford, and Ralph Nader.
- What Did They Know And When? Fukushima Daiichi Before And After The Meltdowns, Symposium: The Medical and Ecological Consequences of the Fukushima Nuclear Accident, The New York Academy of Medicine, New York City, NY, March 11, 2013.

== In media ==
Arnie Gundersen has a relevant cameo appearance in the 2023 Documentary Film SOS: The San Onofre Syndrome directed by James Heddle, Mary Beth Brangan and Morgan Peterson. The film chronicles a community’s victory over leaking reactors, only to confront a chilling reality - deadly radioactive waste stranded next to a rising sea. At the press conference community activists held for the shut down of the San Onofre nuclear plant, the film shows Arnie Gundersen saying: "This has ramifications around the country. This is a seismic event in the nuclear industry."
