= Abraham Abraham =

American businessman (1843–1911)

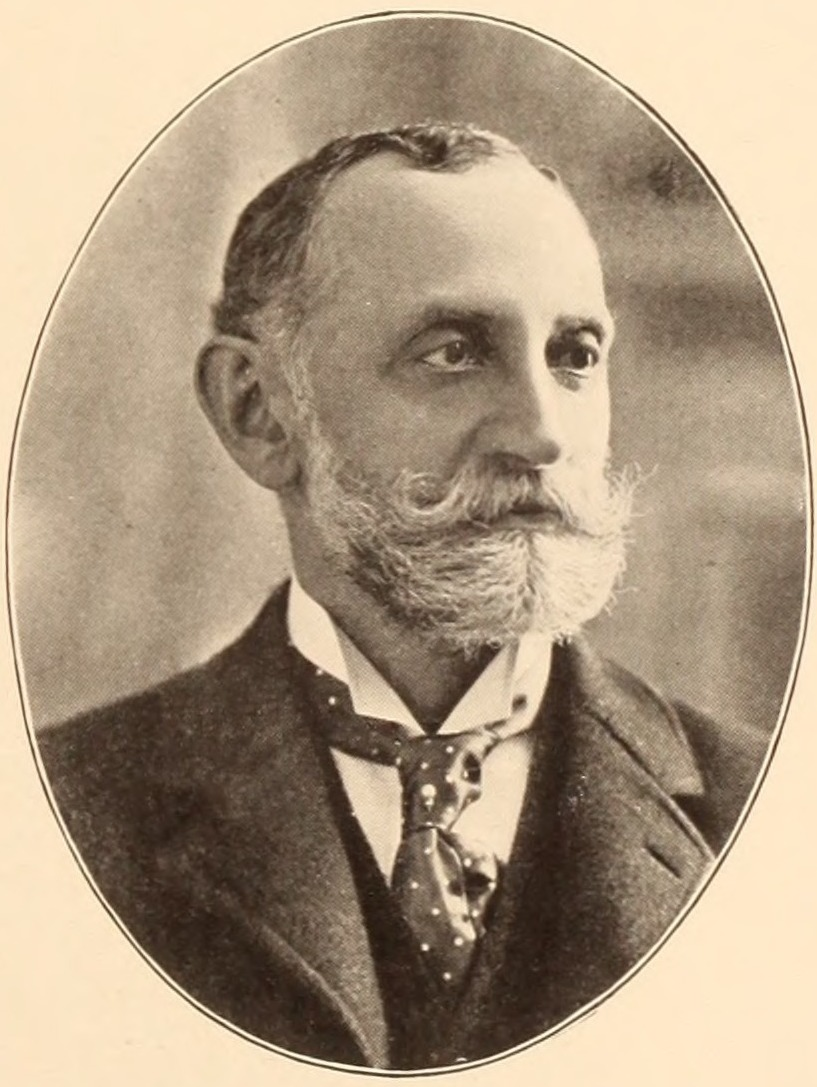
- Born: March 9, 1843; New York City, U.S.
- Died: June 28, 1911 (aged 68); Cherry Island, New York, U.S.
- Occupation: Businessman
- Known for: Founder of Abraham & Straus
- Spouses: Isabella Hyams (m. 1868; died 1875); Rose Epstein (m. 1882)
- Children: Lillian Isabelle Abraham Rothschild (1869–1927); Florence May Abraham Blum (1872–1959); Lawrence Emanuel Abraham (1872–1945); Edith S. Abraham Straus (1882–1957)

Abraham Abraham (March 9, 1843 – June 28, 1911) was an American businessman and the founder of the Brooklyn department store Abraham & Straus, founded 1865. The chain, which became part of Federated Department Stores, is now part of Macy's.

== Early life ==
Abraham was born to a Jewish family, the son of Judah Abraham, a native of Bavaria who left in 1837 and married Sarah Sussman en route to the United States. Soon after arrival, Judah Abraham opened a store on Murray Street in New York. In 1843, Abraham Abraham was born. He had poor health, and wanted to be a violinist. During the Civil War, he ran away to Chicago to enlist, but was brought back by his father. At 14, he worked at Hart & Dettlebach of Newark, along with Simon Bloomingdale and Benjamin Altman for $1 a week.

== Career ==
Abraham opened Wechsler & Abraham in Brooklyn in 1865 at 297 Fulton Street. The company later became Abraham & Straus.

He became a Brooklyn philanthropist, establishing the Brooklyn Jewish Hospital, among many other causes. In 1890, he commissioned a house, now demolished, at 800 St. Mark's Avenue in Brooklyn.

== Personal life ==
Abraham married twice. In 1868, he married Isabella Hyams; she died in 1875. In 1882, he married Rose Epstein; they remained married until his death. He had three children with his first wife and one with his second wife, Rose:

- Lillian Isabelle Abraham Rothschild (married to Simon F. Rothschild);
- Florence May Abraham Blum (married to Edward Charles Blum);
- Lawrence Emanuel Abraham; and
- Edith Abraham Straus (married to Percy Selden Straus, son of Isidor Straus).

His many notable descendants include grandson Donald B. Straus (son of his daughter Edith), an educator, author, and advisor; great-great-granddaughter Nina Rothschild Utne, a magazine publisher; great-great-grandson Peter A. Bradford, civil servant and nuclear power expert, and great-great-great-grandson Arthur Bradford, an author and director.

Abraham died on Cherry Island, near Alexandria Bay, New York.
