= Dale E. Klein =

American nuclear engineering professor

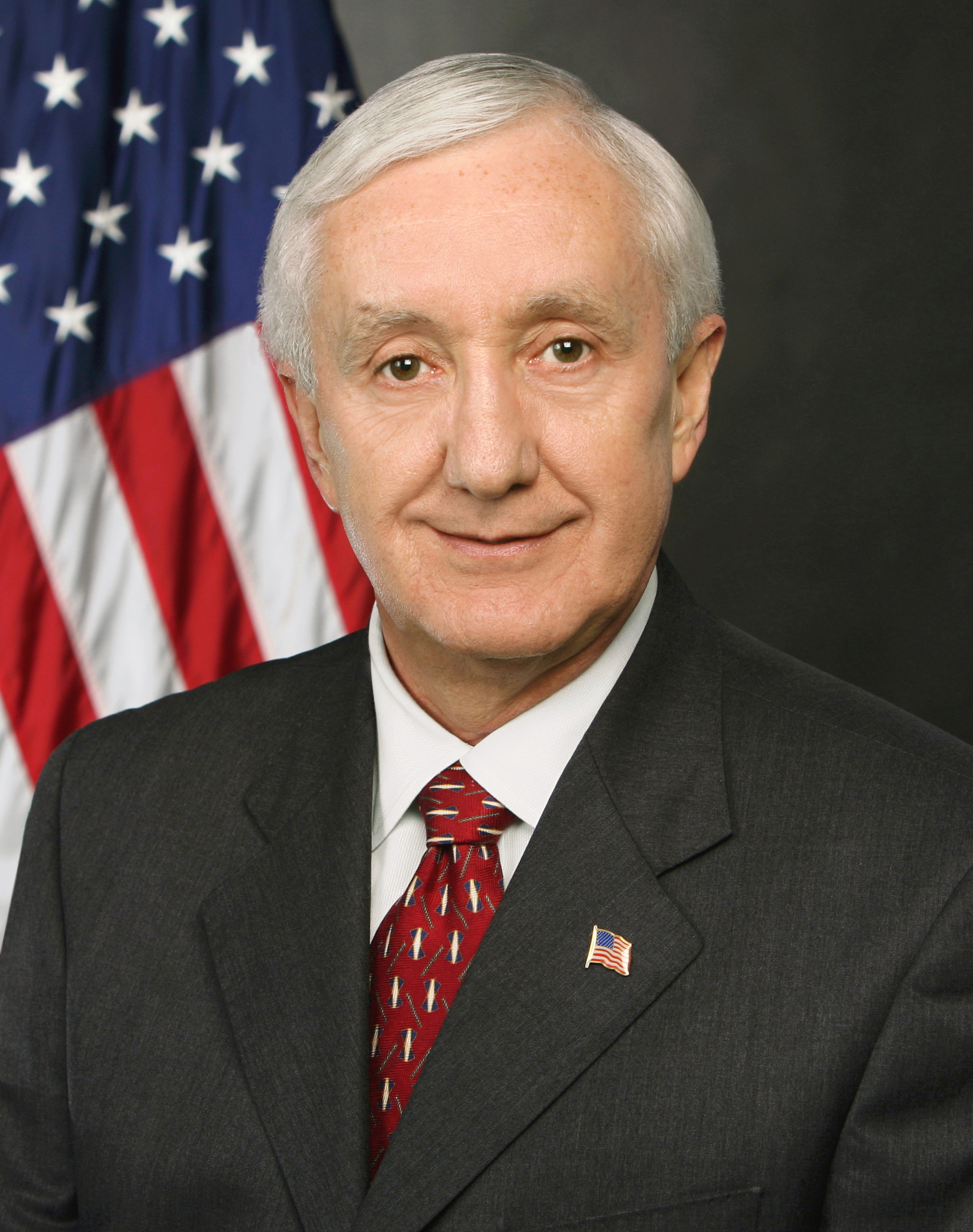

Chair of the Nuclear Regulatory Commission
- In office July 1, 2006 - May 13, 2009
- President: George W. Bush; Barack Obama
- Preceded by: Nils J. Diaz
- Succeeded by: Gregory Jaczko

Member of the Nuclear Regulatory Commission
- In office July 13, 2009 - March 29, 2010
- President: Barack Obama
- Preceded by: Gregory Jaczko
- Succeeded by: George Apostolakis

Dale E. Klein was the chairman of the United States Nuclear Regulatory Commission under Presidents George W. Bush and Barack Obama. He served as chairman from his July 1, 2006 until May 13, 2009. He then served as a Commissioner on the same body from May 13, 2009 until his resignation on March 29, 2010. He was the 13th chairman of the Nuclear Regulatory Commission.

Klein has a history of political donations to Republican candidates, including George W. Bush, Rick Perry, John Cornyn, and John McCain.

In 2025, Klein was elected to the National Academy of Engineering.
