= Stella Stevens Bradford =

American medical doctor (1871–1959)

- Born: June 27, 1871; Montclair, New Jersey, US
- Died: January 20, 1959 (aged 87); New York City, US
- Occupation: Doctor
- Known for: Work on physical therapy and rehabilitation

Stella Stevens Bradford (June 27, 1871 – January 20, 1959) was an American medical doctor, known as a "pioneering leader" in the use of physical therapy for rehabilitation.

== Early life and education ==
Stella Stevens Bradford was born in Montclair, New Jersey, the eldest child of Amory Howe Bradford and Julia Stevens Bradford. Her father and her brother, Arthur Howe Bradford, were Congregational clergymen. Her aunt, Cornelia Foster Bradford, was a social worker and educator in New Jersey. Her nephew, also named Amory Howe Bradford, was vice president of The New York Times. The Bradfords were descended from William Bradford, governor of Plymouth Colony. Bradford earned a bachelor's degree at Smith College in 1893, where she was the first president of the Smith College Association of Christian Work. She further studies of sociology at New York University and German (with special permission) at the University of Göttingen, and earned her medical degree at Cornell University Medical College in 1902.

== Career ==
Bradford taught school before earning her medical degree. She opened a practice in her hometown in 1903. She served as a school medical inspector in Montclair and established a tuberculosis clinic at Gouverneur Hospital in New York City. From 1907 she was medical officer at the Ramapo Hills Sanitarium, and from 1910 medical superintendent of Adams Place, another sanitarium in New Jersey. She helped start the Montclair Public Health Nursing Service, and was medical director of the first fresh-air school in the city.

Bradford's work increasingly focused on physical therapy and rehabilitation for children and adults affected by tuberculosis, polio, rheumatic fever, and other diseases. She studied techniques at Boston City Hospital and in Denmark at the Niels Bukh school. "I am very enthusiastic over the results which Mr. Bukh accomplishes," she reported in 1929. "His method of teaching produces a wonderful improvement in the physical condition of the young people." From 1932 to 1936 she was director of physical therapy at Mountainside Hospital. From 1950 to 1953 she was acting director of the hospital's Physical Medicine and Rehabilitation Department.

Bradford was president of the Montclair Business and Professional Women's Club in 1937. In 1936, the club established a Stella Stevens Bradford Scholarship Fund, to encourage the educational aspirations of girls interested in medical careers. In 1950 the Women's Service Clubs of Essex County gave her the Outstanding Woman of Essex County Award. She retired in 1956. In 1957, the Medical Society of New Jersey marked her career achievements with a Golden Merit Award.

== Personal life ==
Bradford died in New York City in 1959, aged 87 years. "By her own nature she healed hearts and minds as well as bodies, inspired hope and gave strength and a new outlook, rebuilding a new world for those in despair," wrote the editors of The Montclair Times in tribute. Her medical bag was donated to the Montclair Historical Society.
