= Leigh Ann Caldwell =

American political reporter

- Born: 1977 or 1978 (age 48–49); Las Vegas, Nevada, U.S.
- Education: North Carolina State University
- Occupation: Capitol Hill reporter
- Years active: 2004–present
- Employer: Puck News
- Spouse: Gregory Jaczko
- Children: 2

Leigh Ann Caldwell (born 1977/1978) is an American political reporter for Puck, CNN and MS NOW.

== Early life ==
Leigh Ann Caldwell was raised in Las Vegas. She was an accomplished swimmer during her high school days and attended North Carolina State University on a four year scholarship for distance swimming. She majored in Communications and Political Science, graduating in 2000.

== Career ==
Caldwell moved to New York City after graduating and became a freelance journalist. She won an investigative journalism award from the Independent Press Association for her coverage of the rebuilding of New York City after the September 11 attacks. From 2004 to 2012, she launched Radio Rootz, an education initiative for youth.

Caldwell anchored Pacifica Radio's national Free Speech Radio News program from 2006 to 2011. She then worked for C-SPAN (2011), Radio France Internationale, CBS News (2012–2013), and CNN (2013–2014). During the 2008 United States presidential election, she hosted a daily syndicated election show, Election Unspun.

Caldwell joined NBC News in 2014 and served as a Capitol Hill correspondent until moving to CAA in 2019. She covered the 2018–2019 United States federal government shutdown, both impeachment trials of President Donald Trump, the January 6 United States Capitol attack and its aftermath, and four Supreme Court confirmations, including those for Brett Kavanaugh and Amy Coney Barrett. In April 2022, she announced that she was joining The Washington Post to write a morning newsletter and host live events.

In January 2025, Caldwell announced she was joining Puck News as chief Washington correspondent.

Career Timeline

- Free Speech Radio News (2006–2011)
- C-SPAN (2011)
- CBS News (2012–2013)
- CNN (2013–2014)
- NBC News (2014–2022)
- Washington Post (2022–2025)
- Puck News (2025–present)

== Personal life ==
Caldwell is married to physicist Gregory Jaczko, a former chairman of the U.S. Nuclear Regulatory Commission. The couple have two children.
