= Nils J. Diaz =

American scientist (born 1938)

Dr. Nils J. Diaz

Chairmen of the Nuclear Regulatory Commission
- In office April 1, 2003 – June 30, 2006
- President: George W. Bush
- Preceded by: Richard Meserve
- Succeeded by: Dale E. Klein

Member of the Nuclear Regulatory Commission
- In office August 23, 1996 – March 31, 2003
- President: Bill Clinton; George W. Bush

Personal details
- Born: April 7, 1938 (age 88) Camaguey, Cuba
- Party: Republican
- Education: University of Florida

Nils J. Diaz is a former chairman of the Nuclear Regulatory Commission, having worked for the commission between 1996 and 2006. He was the chairman of the commission between 2003 and 2006.

He was a nuclear engineering professor and chairman at the University of Florida in Gainesville, Florida, from the 1970s to the 1990s. Diaz holds a Ph.D. and M.S. in nuclear engineering from the University of Florida, and a B. S. degree in mechanical engineering from the University of Villanova, Havana.

After departing the Nuclear Regulatory Commission, he became the chief strategic officer for Blue Castle Project. He is a former paid consultant for Bechtel.
