= Peter A. Bradford =

American nuclear Regulatory Commissioner

- Occupation: Professor; Civil servant
- Spouses: Katherine Bradford (divorced) Mary Condon (divorced); Susan Symmers
- Children: 3 including Arthur Bradford
- Parent(s): Carol Warburg Rothschild Bradford; Amory Howe Bradford
- Family: Arthur Howe Bradford (grandfather); Felix M. Warburg (great-grandfather); Simon F. Rothschild (great-grandfather); Abraham Abraham (great-great-grandfather); Jacob Schiff (great-great-grandfather)

Peter A. Bradford is a former member of the U.S. Nuclear Regulatory Commission who teaches energy policy and law at the Vermont Law School. He is the author of Fragile Structures: A Story of Oil Refineries, National Security and the Coast of Maine and has written many articles. He served on various advisory panels and expert groups relating to nuclear power. He participated in a 1968 Ralph Nader-sponsored study of the Federal Trade Commission. Bradford has a law degree from Yale Law School.

== Early life and education ==
Bradford is the son of Carol Warburg Rothschild (d. 2005) and Amory Howe Bradford (d. 1998). His father was the general manager of The New York Times and the son of Congregational minister Arthur Howe Bradford. His mother was the granddaughter of Felix M. Warburg and Simon F. Rothschild; and the great-granddaughter of Abraham Abraham and Jacob Schiff. His parents divorced in 1963 and his mother remarried in 1965 to diplomat Charles P. Noyes. He has one brother, David A. Bradford, and three sisters, Carola Bradford Lea, Madhavi Bradford, and Deborah Bradford. He is a 1964 graduate of Yale University and received his law degree from the Yale Law School in 1968.

== Career ==
Peter A. Bradford is a former member of the U.S. Nuclear Regulatory Commission and former chair of the Maine and New York utility commissions. He teaches energy policy and law at the Vermont Law School and has taught at Yale School of Forestry and Environmental Studies. He is the author of Fragile Structures: A Story of Oil Refineries, National Security and the Coast of Maine and has written many articles. He is Vice-Chair of the Union of Concerned Scientists. He served on a panel advising the European Bank for Reconstruction and Development on how best to replace the remaining Chernobyl nuclear power plants. He was part of an expert panel advising the Austrian Institute for Risk Reduction on issues associated with the opening of the Mochovce Nuclear Power Plant in western Slovakia. He also participated in a 1968 Ralph Nader-sponsored study of the Federal Trade Commission: The Nader Report on the Federal Trade Commission.

== Views on nuclear power ==
Bradford has discussed the historic management disasters embodied by dollar losses to the extent of nine-figures at Shoreham, Seabrook, Washington Public Power Supply System, and Midland sites.

Bradford argues that nuclear power is not a magic-bullet answer to climate change. He has said:

Even if it is scaled up much faster than anything now in prospect, it cannot provide more than 10 per cent to 15 per cent of the greenhouse gas displacement that is likely to be needed by mid-century. Not only can nuclear power not stop global warming, it is probably not even an essential part of the solution to global warming.

In an early-2010 interview, with President Barack Obama's fresh budget proposal to triple available loan guarantees, to $54 billion, for nuclear power plants, Bradford made clear he was not a total opponent of more nuclear. However, Bradford outlined the failure of the $18 billion of guarantees available over the last several years to generate new construction—and even "scandals ... in Florida and in Texas" to do with them --, combined with the high cost of electricity from nuclear and other factors, to specify why he didn't see nuclear as a desirable major source for climate-change mitigation. He saw perhaps the benefit of some limited plant development within the context of a cap and trade regime (not yet in place).

Bradford is also serving in 2010 as the chair of a Vermont state legislative oversight panel relative to Entergy Corporation's operation of its Vermont Yankee nuclear plant. The panel was created in June, 2008, made a report in March, 2009, when Bradford was rotating chair, and was scheduled to report again in February, 2010.

Bradford says the nuclear renaissance in the United States was just a myth, as the many applications for new reactors in 2009 has led to very little construction.

Along with former Japanese Prime Minister Naoto Kan, Former NRC Chair Gregory Jaczko, and Arnie Gundersen, Bradford participated in the panel Fukushima: Ongoing Lessons for California, held in San Diego, CA, on June 4, 2013, as documented in the 2023 documentary film SOS: The San Onofre Syndrome.

== Personal life ==
Bradford married thrice. His first wife was artist Katherine Bradford; they had two children before divorcing, Arthur Bradford and Laura Rothschild Bradford Kirkpatrick. His second wife was Mary Condon; they had one child, Emily Anson Bradford. They later divorced. He remarried to Susan Symmers.
