= Arthur Howe Bradford =

American minister (1883–1973)

- Born: November 19, 1883; Montclair, New Jersey, US
- Died: August 29, 1973 (aged 89); Peterborough, New Hampshire, US
- Education: Yale University
- Occupation: Minister
- Spouse: Frances Eugenia Price
- Family: Stella Stevens Bradford (sister); Peter A. Bradford (grandson); Arthur Bradford (great-grandson)

Arthur Howe Bradford (November 19, 1883 – August 29, 1973) was an American minister.

== Early life and education ==
Bradford was born on November 19, 1883, in Montclair, New Jersey to Rev. Amory Howe Bradford and Julia Maria Bradford (née Stevens). Through an entirely paternal line he was descended from Mayflower passenger William Bradford. His father was a notable clergyman, the minister of the First Congregational Church of Montclair for 40 years.

Bradford attended Montclair High School and graduated from Yale University in 1905, where he was a member of Psi Upsilon and the Skull and Bones. He studied at Union Theological Seminary and was ordained in 1909. He received Doctor of Divinity degrees from Brown University and Middlebury College. He also received an honorary Master of Arts degree from Yale and an honorary Doctor of Human Letters degree from Bryant College in 1951.

== Career ==
Bradford worked at the Union Settlement in New York from 1908 to 1909. He then served as an associate minister at South Congregational Church in Springfield, Massachusetts from 1909 to 1912, and minister of East Parish Congregational Church in Rutland (city), Vermont from 1913 to 1918.

Bradford was seventh senior minister of Central Congregational Church in Providence, Rhode Island, serving for 34 years, from 1918 until the church's centennial in 1952. During his ministry, he ended the practice of pew renting at the church. In 1965, the church dedicated a new Aeolian-Skinner organ "in honor and appreciation of the ministry of Arthur Howe Bradford D.D." After retiring from Central Church, he served as an interim pastor at New England churches for the next 15 years.

Bradford was a trustee of Yale University from 1925 to 1952, and served as the Lyman Beecher lecturer at Yale Divinity School in 1940. He served as the first president of the Rhode Island Council of Churches, and as a trustee of the Champlin Foundation and other institutions. He was a member of the American Missionary Association, the Religious Education Association and the Knights of Pythias. He was a direct descendant of William Bradford, Governor of Plymouth Colony.

== Personal life and death ==
Bradford married Frances Eugenia Price of Brooklyn, New York in 1911. They had several children including Arthur Jr., Amory Howe Bradford, Jean Bradford, and J. Allyn Bradford. His son, Amory, was general manager of The New York Times and father of Peter A. Bradford.

Bradford died on August 29, 1973, aged 89, in Peterborough, New Hampshire.
