= Gregory Jaczko =

Physicist and former chairman of the U.S. Nuclear Regulatory Commission

Greg Jaczko
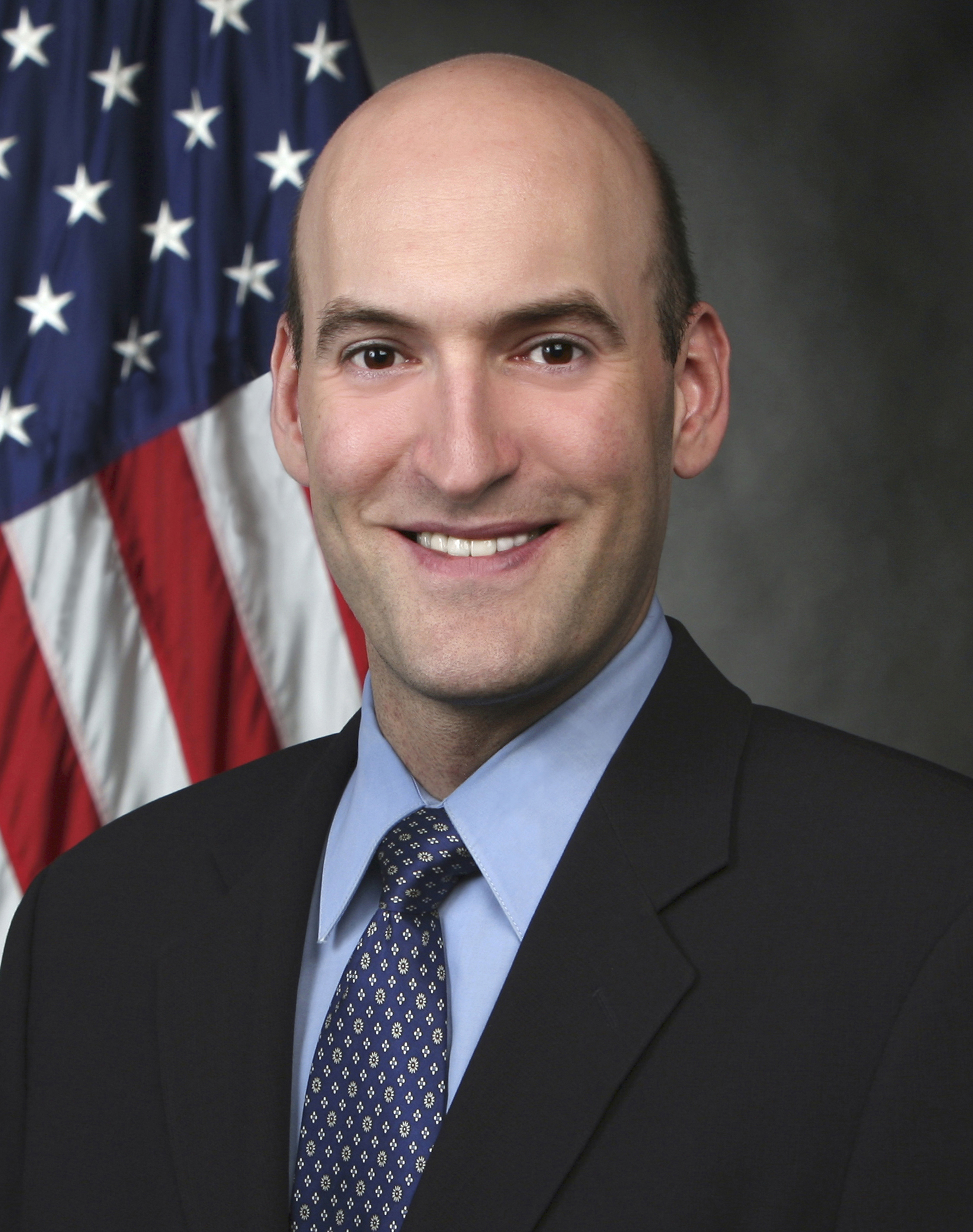
- Official portrait, 2006

Chair of the Nuclear Regulatory Commission
- In office May 13, 2009 – July 9, 2012
- President: Barack Obama
- Preceded by: Dale E. Klein
- Succeeded by: Allison Macfarlane

Personal details
- Born: October 29, 1970 (age 55) Norristown, Pennsylvania, U.S.
- Party: Democratic
- Spouse: Leigh Ann Caldwell
- Education: Cornell University (BS); University of Wisconsin, Madison (MS, PhD)

Gregory B. Jaczko (/ˈjɑːskoʊ/; born October 29, 1970, Norristown, Pennsylvania) is a physicist who is the 13th and former chairman of the U.S. Nuclear Regulatory Commission (NRC) from 2009 to 2012. While at the NRC, he voted against the opening of new nuclear plants; an inspector general report found that he sought unilaterally and improperly to block the Yucca Mountain nuclear waste repository project from advancing. After leaving the NRC, Jaczko called for a global ban on nuclear power.

== Early life and education ==
Jaczko was raised in Albany, New York, the son of Kathryn Marie and Bela L. Jaczko. He studied physics and philosophy at Cornell University in Ithaca, New York; he earned a bachelor in the two disciplines there in 1993. In 1999, he earned a doctorate in theoretical particle physics from the University of Wisconsin–Madison.

He is married to journalist Leigh Ann Caldwell.

== Political career ==
Jaczko served as a Congressional Science Fellow in the office of U.S. Representative Ed Markey in Washington, D.C., on the basis of an AAAS Science and Technology Policy Fellowship. He also worked as an adjunct professor for Physics and Public Policy under Dr. Francis Slakey at Georgetown University in Washington, D.C.

He later advised the United States Senate Committee on Environment and Public Works on issues regarding nuclear power. He served as appropriations director for U.S. Senator Harry Reid and as Reid's science policy advisor.

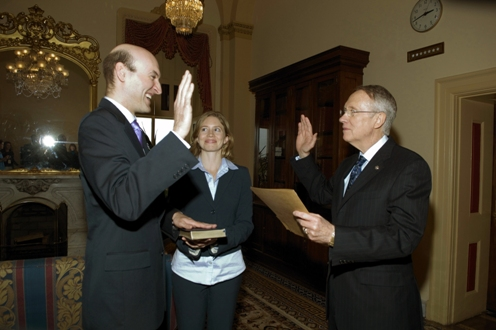
Senator Harry Reid swearing in Jaczko

=== Nuclear Regulatory Commission ===
Jaczko was first sworn in as a Commissioner of the Nuclear Regulatory Commission (NRC) on January 21, 2005. On May 13, 2009, President Obama designated him the organization's chairman, its principal executive officer and official spokesperson. The chairman is responsible for long-range planning as well as budgetary and certain personnel functions of the NRC. “He also has authority for all NRC functions pertaining to a potential emergency involving an NRC licensee”.

=== Policy positions ===
Jaczko has asserted that the greatest possible openness furthers the Nuclear Regulatory Commission's work on the protection of the environment and of public health and safety. He encourages “licensees, vendors, state and local governments, interest groups, and the general public” to participate in the commission's policy-making efforts. Efforts by Jaczko to strengthen security regulations for nuclear power plants have included requiring new such plants to be able to withstand an aircraft crash.

On February 9, 2012, Jaczko cast the lone dissenting vote on plans to build the first new nuclear power plant in more than 30 years when the NRC voted 4–1 to allow Atlanta-based Southern Co to build and operate two new nuclear power reactors at its existing Vogtle nuclear power plant in Georgia. He cited safety concerns stemming from Japan's 2011 Fukushima nuclear disaster, saying "I cannot support issuing this license as if Fukushima never happened".

=== Management style and resignation ===
A report by Nuclear Regulatory Commission Inspector General Hubert T. Bell found that Jaczko "strategically" withheld information from his colleagues in an effort to keep plans for the Yucca Mountain nuclear waste repository from advancing.

In October 2011, all the other four NRC commissioners—two Democrats and two Republicans—sent a letter to the White House expressing "grave concern" about Jaczko's actions at the NRC. On December 14, 2011, Commissioner William Ostendorff, a Republican, told a House oversight committee that Jaczko's "bullying and intimidation... should not and cannot be tolerated."

At a House Government Reform and Oversight Committee hearing on December 14, 2011, NRC Commissioner William Magwood, a fellow Democrat, testified about what he called Jaczko's abusive behavior towards employees, especially female subordinates. “One woman told me that she felt the chairman was actually irritated with someone else, but took it out on her,” Magwood said. “Another said she was angry at herself for being brought to tears in front of male colleagues. A third described how she couldn’t stop shaking after her experience. She sat, talking with her supervisor until she could calm down sufficiently to drive home.”

A report by the Government Reform and Oversight Committee detailed incidents indicating what was cited as Jaczko's "propensity for angry outbursts and aggressive behavior." A 2012 NRC Office of Inspector General report identified multiple examples where his behavior was not supportive of an open and collaborative work environment. Top House Republicans called on President Obama to dismiss Jaczko.

Jaczko said problems at the agency were not his fault but instead stem from "lack of understanding" on the part of others. Senate Majority Leader Harry Reid defended Jaczko, saying his critics are attacking him because "they’re concerned about the nuclear industry. He’s concerned about the American people."

Peter A. Bradford, who was a commission member from 1977 to 1982, has also defended Jaczko. Bradford said it was not unusual for the commissioners to disagree strongly, and added that he did not believe that "the chairman is somehow raging around the agency and intimidating the staff". He also argued that, although the letter about Jaczko was written by two Republicans and two Democrats, it was necessarily bi-partisan in the context of nuclear politics. He claimed that "In Washington, you’ve got a situation where the ‘nuclear party’ transcends the Republican and Democratic party," adding that "You’ve got four members of the nuclear party writing a letter about the chairman, who’s never been a member of the nuclear party."

On May 21, 2012, he announced his resignation pending the confirmation of the next person to fill this role. On July 9, 2012, Jaczko was replaced by Allison Macfarlane, a nuclear waste expert and associate professor at George Mason University.

In 2013 he was appointed by Harry Reid to a post on a Congressional panel overseeing the National Nuclear Security Administration

=== 2026 congressional campaign ===
Jaczko ran for the Democratic nomination for the District of Columbia's non-voting delegate, vying to succeed Eleanor Holmes Norton, in the 2026 election. By May, he had raised $113,000 and Politico described his bid as a "long-shot" compared to councilmembers Robert White and Brooke Pinto. His stated campaign goals included boosting the federal workforce, improving federal agencies' work with city residents and government, exempting the city from federal income taxes, and electricity affordability through renewable energy build-out. He placed 5th in the June primary election with 2.88% of the vote.

== In media ==
Gregory Jaczko has an important cameo appearance in the 2023 documentary film SOS: The San Onofre Syndrome, directed by James Heddle, Mary Beth Brangan and Morgan Peterson. In a recent interview producer Mary Beth Brangan stated that it was the Fukushima nuclear disaster that set her and her life partner, James Heddle, into the making of the film. The film documents a special visit prime minister Naoto Kan made to San Diego on June 4, 2013 in order to participate in a panel entitled "Fukushima: Ongoing Lessons for California", along with Nuclear Regulatory Commission chair Gregory Jaczko, former NRC Commissioner Peter A. Bradford, and nuclear engineer Arnie Gundersen, where they discussed nuclear power's risks.

In the film, which issues a critical warning that America's 55 nuclear power plants, each of which has tons of intensely radioactive waste that lasts millennia—in inadequate temporary storage containers with no plans to repair them—are putting their local communities and national security at grave risk. In archival footage from a KPBS news program, Jaczko stated: "But frankly once they get loaded, I don't see them ever taking those canisters out of there. Realistically, they're not going to move them out. So those permits will be extended. The operational period will be extended repeatedly, and you will have a de facto burial site."

Political offices
Preceded by Dale E. Klein	Chair of the Nuclear Regulatory Commission; 2009–2012	Succeeded by Allison Macfarlane
