= Arthur Bradford =

American writer and filmmaker

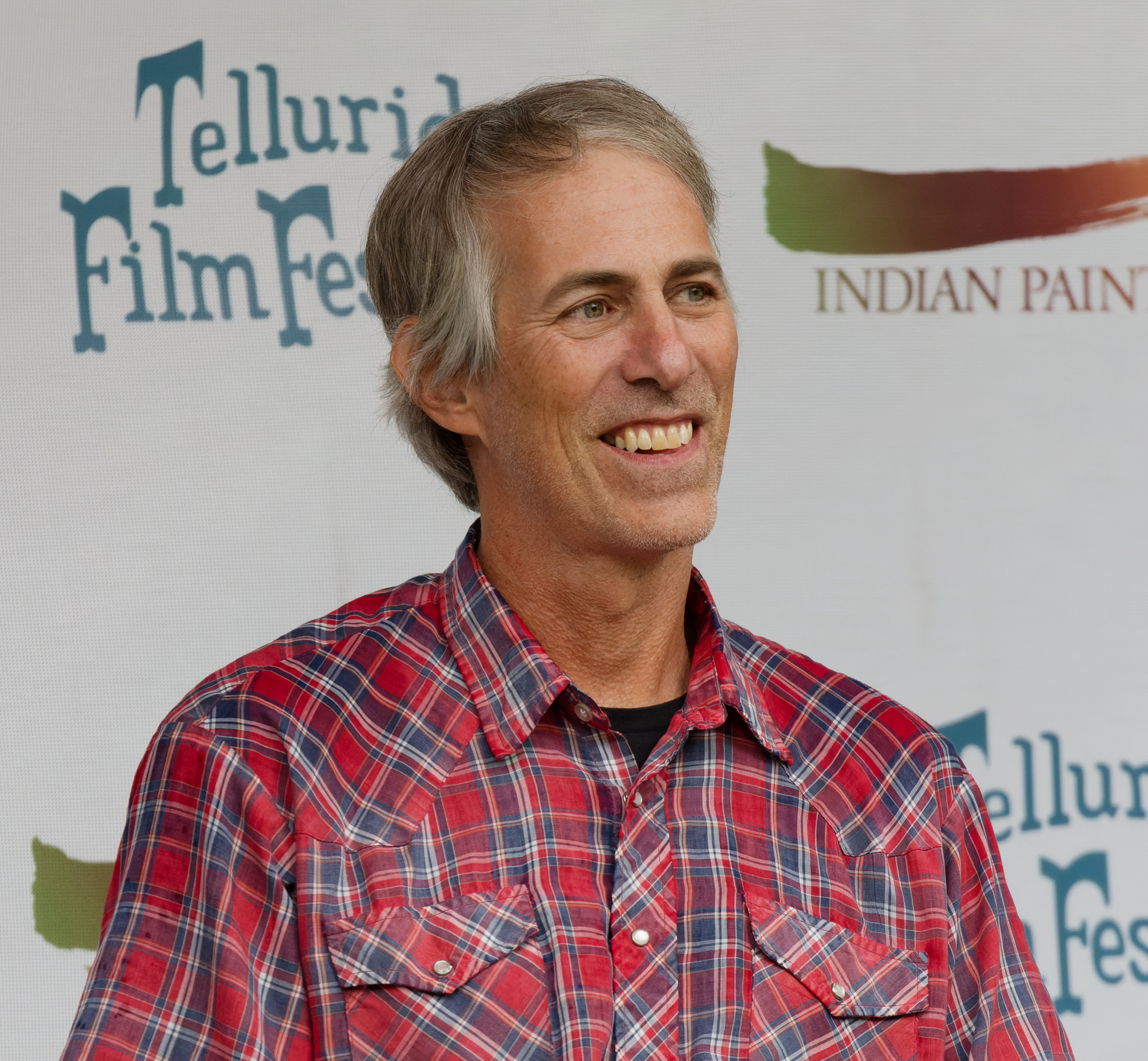
- Bradford at the 2024 Telluride Film Festival
- Born: November 19, 1969 (age 56); Boothbay Harbor, Maine, U.S.
- Education: Yale University (BA); University of Texas at Austin (MFA)
- Occupations: Filmmaker, writer
- Writing career
- Notable works: Films: How's Your News? (2003); 6 Days to Air (2011) ¡Casa Bonita Mi Amor! (2024); Books: Dogwalker (2001); Benny's Brigade (2012); Turtleface and Beyond (2015)
- Notable awards: Emmy Nomination, 2011, 6 Days to Air; Audience Award, Tribeca Film Festival, 2024, ¡Casa Bonita Mi Amor!
- Website: linktree.com/arthurbradford

Arthur Houston Bradford (born November 19, 1969) is an American writer and filmmaker. He has published two books of short stories, Dogwalker (2001) and Turtleface and Beyond (2015), and a children's book, Benny's Brigade (2012). He has directed the How's Your News? documentary series and the Emmy-nominated documentary film 6 Days to Air, as well as the documentaries ¡Casa Bonita Mi Amor! and To Be Destroyed.

== Life ==
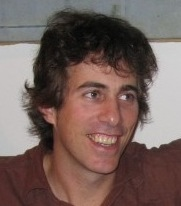
Bradford in 2011

Bradford was born in Boothbay Harbor, Maine, the son of energy regulator Peter A. Bradford and painter Katherine Bradford. He and his twin sister, Laura Bradford, grew up in Maine and New York City. They both attended Phillips Academy and Yale University, graduating in 1993. After graduating, Bradford moved to Austin, Texas, where he worked at The Texas School for the Blind and began writing short stories and making short films. During this time he was awarded a Wallace Stegner fellow at Stanford University and later earned an MFA from the University of Texas at Austin.

After the publication of his first book, Dogwalker, in 2001, Bradford lived briefly in a remote cabin in The Northeast Kingdom where he wrote and published several short stories about the experience. He later moved to Brooklyn, New York, in order to pursue filmmaking. In 2005 he became the co-director of Camp Jabberwocky, a residential camp for people with disabilities. It was there that he originated the How's Your News? series with help from South Park creators Matt Stone and Trey Parker.

Bradford is the great-great-grandson of Felix M. Warburg and Simon F. Rothschild; and the great-great-great-grandson of Abraham Abraham and Jacob Schiff. A direct descendant of the first governor of Massachusetts, William Bradford, he was named after his great grandfather, the minister Arthur Howe Bradford.

== Literary works ==
Bradford's short stories have won an O. Henry Award and have been published in Esquire, McSweeneys, Zoetrope, Dazed & Confused, Tin House, and Vice. His first book, Dogwalker (2001), is a collection of stories centered around his experiences in Austin and Vermont. His second book, Benny's Brigade (2012) recounts the adventures of two girls who discover a small talking walrus inside a walnut. It was illustrated by Lisa Hanawalt. His third book, the short story collection Turtleface and Beyond was published by Farrar, Straus, and Giroux in 2015.

In 2014, Planthouse, Inc. published the limited edition artist book Forty-Three Monsters by Bradford and Chuck Webster. Bradford contributed a comic narrative to accompany Chuck Webster's childhood monster drawings from the 1970s.

Bradford was a contributor to the McSweeney's publication The Future Dictionary of America. He has also written outdoor travel stories for Men's Journal, Powder Magazine, and Nowheremag.com. Bradford has performed several stories for the nationally syndicated radio show The Moth and one of his stories, "The Quest for Chad", appears in the Moth anthology All These Wonders, published by Crown Publishing Group.

== Filmmaking ==
While a student at Yale, Bradford created a public access TV show called Street TV which featured candid, man-on-the-street interviews. He later taught a video class at Camp Jabberwocky, a residential camp for adults with disabilities and with several other counselors developed the concept for the documentary series How's Your News?. Early video tapes were seen by South Park creators Matt Stone and Trey Parker who became executive producers on the project. Bradford directed the first How's Your News? feature film, a documentary wherein disabled and handicapped adults interview unsuspecting passersby in a cross-country road trip, in 2001. The film was broadcast on HBO, PBS, and British channel, Channel 4. The concept was expanded and developed into a series for MTV and broadcast throughout 2009. Bradford served as executive producer and director.

Bradford directed 6 Days to Air, a documentary that depicts the making of an episode of South Park, which premiered on Comedy Central on October 9, 2011. It was nominated for an Emmy award in the outstanding non-fiction special category. He directed the 2024 films ¡Casa Bonita Mi Amor! and To Be Destroyed, both of which premiered at the Tribeca Festival. ¡Casa Bonita Mi Amor! won the Audience Award for Best Documentary.

He has directed music videos for bands such as State Radio and The Dandy Warhols.

Bradford is the narrator and subject of the short film Giants, about his efforts to save three 130-year-old giant sequoias from destruction in Portland, Oregon. The film contains original footage he shot during a neighborhood standoff with police as the trees were about to be cut down. He hosts a weekly live call-in radio show on XRAY.FM called Sex, Drugs, & Basketball.

== Bibliography ==
- Dogwalker (Alfred A. Knopf, 2001, ISBN 0-375-72669-1)
- Benny's Brigade (McSweeney's, 2012, ISBN 1-93636561-8)
- Turtleface and Beyond (Farrar, Straus, and Giroux, 2015, ISBN 0-37427806-7)

== Filmography ==
- How's Your News? (1999)
- 6 Days to Air: The Making of South Park (2011)
- ¡Casa Bonita Mi Amor! (2024)
