= How's Your News? =

- Genre: Comedy; Infotainment
- Created by: Arthur Bradford
- Country of origin: United States
- No. of episodes: 6

Production
- Executive producers: Matt Stone; Trey Parker
- Producers: Jennifer Ollman; Vernon Chatman
- Running time: 30 minutes (incl. commercials)
- Production company: AM/FM Pictures

Original release
- Network: MTV
- Release: February 8 – March 15, 2009

How's Your News? is an American television series and also a feature film. It aired Sundays on MTV in the United States, and the feature film based on the same concept was released in 2003. It stars a group of reporters with developmental disabilities who interview celebrities and politicians. It is the continuation of a documentary film project started in 1999 by Arthur Bradford at Camp Jabberwocky in Martha's Vineyard, which was made into a movie of the same name and shown on HBO in 2003. South Park creators Trey Parker and Matt Stone serve as the show's executive producers. Season One had a total of 6 episodes.

According to the How's Your News? website on April 9, 2009, the show was not renewed for a second season on MTV, stating:

"The decision had little to do with the quality of the series, which was one of the most enthusiastically received and best reviewed programs on mtv this year. It's just a tough financial time and mtv needed to keep pushing for higher ratings with other shows. Also, we always knew that our series was an unusual fit for their style of programming. We're not "The Hills" or "America's Next Best Dance Crew" after all..."

After completing the feature film for HBO, the concept was pitched to the Trio network, who subsequently backed the short film "On the Campaign Trail", about the How's Your News? teams trip to both the Democratic and Republican conventions in 2004. The half-hour film was broadcast on Trio and Channel Four England and featured candid interviews with Hillary Clinton, John McCain, Andre 3000, Ben Affleck, Howard Dean, Michael Moore and Newt Gingrich, amongst others. Although it was rarely seen, this half-hour documentary was well-reviewed and helped convince MTV of the viability of the concept as mainstream TV series. They funded a pilot in 2006.

In 2012 How's Your News visited both the Republican and Democratic conventions again with support from Matt Stone, and released a one-hour documentary special.

== Cast ==
- Jeremy Vest
- Susan Harrington
- Robert "Bobby" Bird
- Sean Costello
- Larry Perry
- Lucas Wahl
- Brendan "B-Money" Lemieux

== Episodes ==
Season One

1. Los Angeles, CA
2. Las Vegas, NV
3. Austin, TX
4. New Orleans, LA
5. Louisville, KY
6. New York, NY

== Reviews ==
- Tom Shales, "Disabled Get Last Laugh on MTV's 'News'", Washington Post
- Kinon, Cristina (January 9, 2009). "MTV show has 'How's Your News?'-worthy premise". New York Daily News. Archived from the original on January 16, 2009.
- Roger Catlin, "MTV's Asks: 'How's Your News?'", Hartford Courant
- Xeni Jardin, "BB Video: How's Your News? Comedy/News by Disabled People, Produced by South Park's Matt + Trey", BoingBoing.net
