= Abraham & Straus =

New York City department store

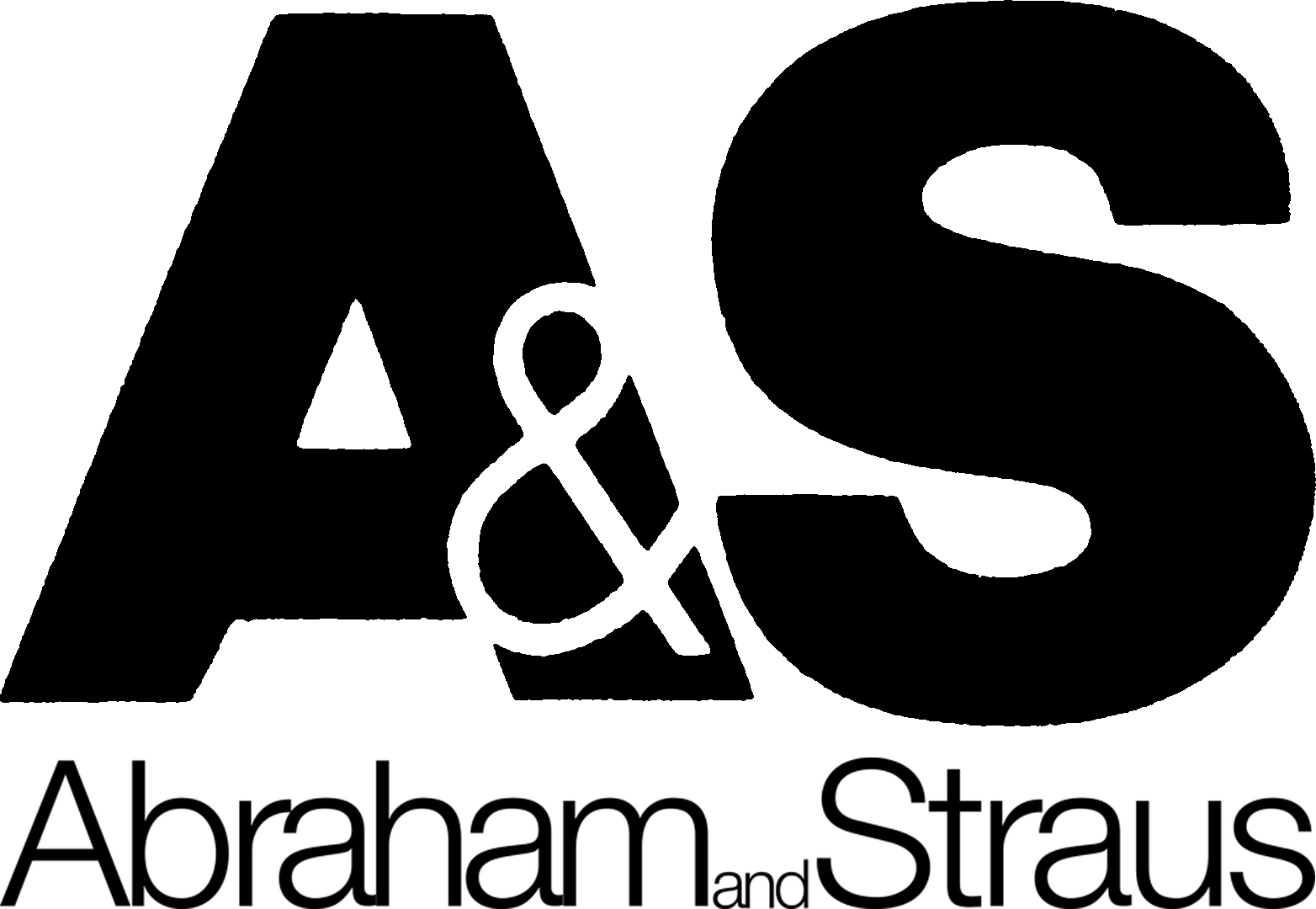
- Type: Corporation
- Industry: Retail
- Founded: February 14, 1865; 161 years ago in Brooklyn, New York
- Founder: Abraham Abraham; Joseph Wechsler
- Defunct: April 30, 1995; 31 years ago
- Fate: Acquired by Federated Department Stores, converted to Macy's and Stern's
- Successor: Macy's; Stern's
- Headquarters: Brooklyn, New York City, U.S.
- Products: Clothing, footwear, bedding, furniture, jewelry, beauty products, and housewares.
- Parent: Federated Department Stores (1929–1995)

Abraham & Straus, commonly shortened to A&S, was a major New York City department store, based in Brooklyn. Founded in 1865, it became part of Federated Department Stores in 1929. Shortly after Federated's 1994 acquisition of R.H. Macy & Company, it eliminated the A&S brand. Most A&S stores took the Macy's name, although a few became part of Stern's, another Federated division, but one that offered lower-end goods than Macy's or A&S did.

== History ==
=== Timeline ===
- 1800s - The store was founded in 1865 in Brooklyn, New York, as Wechsler & Abraham by Joseph Wechsler and Abraham Abraham. In 1893, the Straus family (including Isidor Straus and Nathan Straus), who acquired a general partnership with Macy's department stores in 1888, bought out Joseph Wechsler's interest in Wechsler & Abraham and changed the store's name to Abraham & Straus. While Abraham & Straus did not at that time become a part of Macy's, the two stores shared an overseas office and maintained close ties.
- 1900s - Federated Department Stores, Inc. was formed in 1929 as a holding company by several family-owned department stores, including Abraham & Straus, F&R Lazarus & Co. (along with its Cincinnati-based subsidiary, Shillito's), and Filene's of Boston. Corporate offices established in Columbus, Ohio, later moved to Cincinnati. In 1992, Federated Department Stores merged with Allied Stores Corporation. The A&S and Jordan Marsh divisions were consolidated, forming the A&S/Jordan Marsh division, headquartered in Brooklyn, NY. Early in the new year, Macy's filed for bankruptcy protection under Chapter 11. In 1994 the Federated Department Stores acquired the now bankrupt R.H. Macy & Company and combined Macy's, headquartered in New York City, with A&S/Jordan Marsh. In 1995, the name Abraham & Straus was dropped in favor of the more widely known name Macy's.
- 2000s - In 2006, a historic bronze plaque honoring Isidor and Ida Straus and memorializing their deaths during the sinking of the RMS Titanic was removed from the Macy's flagship store during a 34th Street store renovation, and given to the Straus family. On May 29, 2014, members of the Straus family, the Straus Historical Society, and Macy's Executive Staff gathered for the re-dedication of the Isidor and Ida Straus Memorial Plaque at the 34th Street Memorial Entrance of Macy's Herald Square.

=== Founding and early history ===
Namesakes

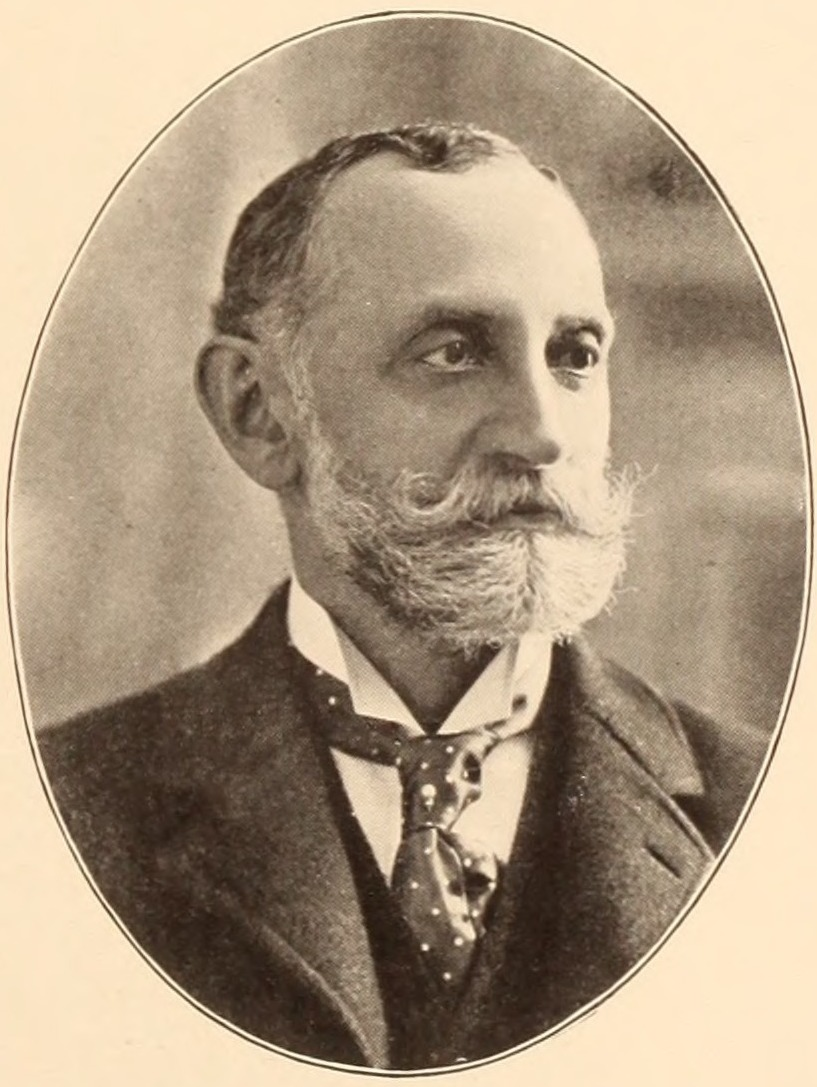
Abraham

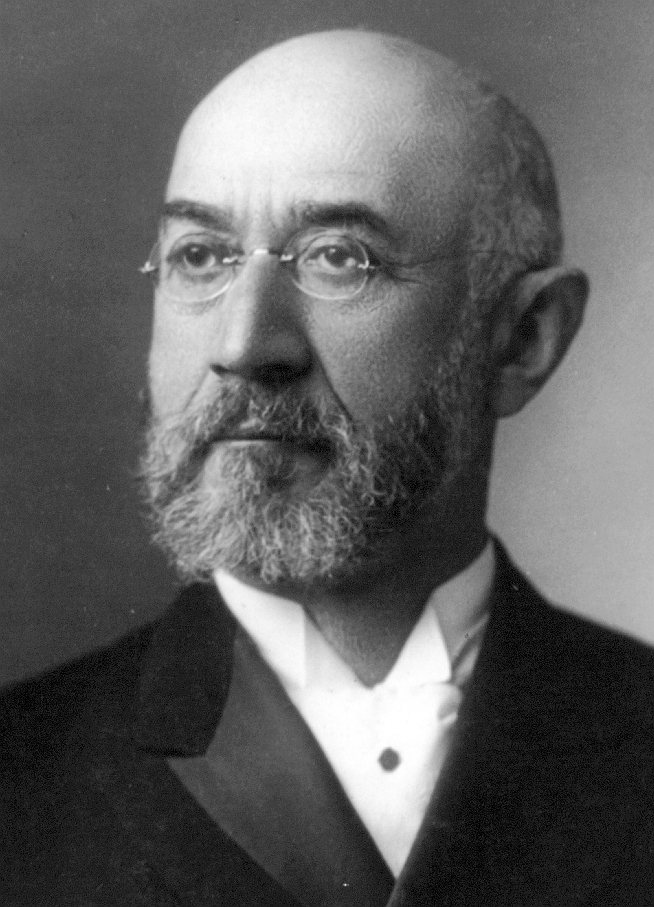
Straus

The first Brooklyn store, at 285 Fulton Street, opened in 1865 and measured 25 feet by 90 feet. Abraham Abraham, age 22, and Joseph Wechsler each contributed $5,000 for the purchase. In 1883, the firm bought the recently built Second Empire cast-iron Wheeler Building at 422 Fulton Street to be their flagship store.

On April 1, 1893, Wechsler was bought out by Nathan Straus, Isidor Straus, and Simon F. Rothschild. The Straus brothers provided the financing, but Rothschild was the active partner. The firm became Abraham & Straus. At the time, the company had 2,000 employees. Simon F. Rothschild, Abraham's son-in-law, Edward Charles Blum, and son, Lawrence Abraham, became partners in the new firm.

=== 1900–1969 ===
By 1900, the company had 4,650 employees. From the 1890s to the 1920s, A&S utilized a system of catalog store agencies across Long Island to serve customers.

In 1912, Isidor Straus, along with his wife Ida, died in the sinking of the RMS Titanic.

Around 1915, after Abraham's daughter married Isidor's son Percy Selden Straus, the Straus family divided up the empire with Nathan's family running A&S and Isidor's family running Macy's.

Beginning in 1928, the company embarked on a $7.8 million expansion of the Fulton Street Store, which included excavating a new basement without disturbing customers above. The renovated store opened October 10, just days before the Wall Street Crash of 1929. In the summer of 1929, the company joined Filene's and Lazarus to form Federated Department Stores. Bloomingdale's joined the following year. To economize during the Depression, the company began scheduling employees according to hourly sales. In addition, all employees took a 10 percent pay cut. No employees were laid off.

In 1937, Walter N. Rothschild led the company, and was president and chairman until 1955. Following Rothschild, Sidney L. Solomon became the company's first non-family president. At the time, the company had 12,000 employees.

After World War II – The company grew. In 1950, the company purchased Loeser's Garden City store, and two years later, its first new branch store opened in Hempstead, New York.

In the following decades, the company expanded throughout the New York metropolitan area. Among its expansions was an anchor store at Paramus Park in Paramus, New Jersey, which necessitated the building of an access road that, despite the conversion of the store to Macy's, is still today known as A&S Drive.

=== 1970–1995 ===
In the 1970s, Federated attempted to update the image of A&S and funded the construction of new, more upscale stores. A&S developed a new logo that once again branded the stores Abraham & Straus. The company opened a central distribution center which decreased the amount of non-selling space needed in each store.

In 1978, the firm opened the first of its more upscale stores at the Monmouth Mall in Eatontown, New Jersey. This was followed by stores in White Plains, New York, in 1980, The Mall at Short Hills in New Jersey, in 1981, and a replacement for the chain's Babylon, Long Island store at Westfield Sunrise Mall.

In 1981 and 1982, the chain opened two stores at malls in the suburban Philadelphia market, The Court at King of Prussia and Willow Grove Park Mall. These new stores struggled to find their niche, and the two Pennsylvania stores were closed in 1987 and 1988, respectively, and the space became occupied by Philadelphia-based Strawbridge and Clothier.

The Short Hills, New Jersey store seemed out of place in the very upscale mall, and customers resisted what were seen to be the store's more rigid policies concerning check acceptance, inter-store transfers, and refunds. Eventually, A&S would stock the Short Hills location with merchandise that better befit the location.

In 1994, Federated acquired Macy's. Since both Macy's and A&S competed for the same type of middle-income customer, Federated felt that the weaker A&S brand should be eliminated. In January 1995, it was announced that all A&S locations would be converted to other brands by April 30. Most became Macy's or Stern's, but one location was converted to a Bloomingdale's and another was sold to Sears. The two A&S stores getting replaced by Bloomingdale's and Sears were closed whereas most locations turning into Macy's or Stern's were rebranded without any interruption. The A&S locations at Queens Center and Sunrise Mall were closed to make room respectively for existing Macy's and Stern's stores relocating with their own employees in the spaces. The chain ended its operations on April 30, though the Roosevelt Field location (the one being taken over by Bloomingdale's) continued its clearance sale as a A&S store until its final closure on May 28, 1995.

Logos

1893–1955

1955–1960s

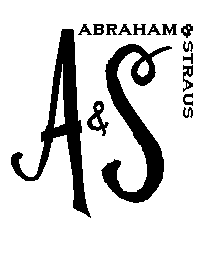
late 1960s–1976

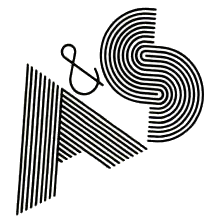
1976-1978

1978–1987

== Fulton Street flagship store ==
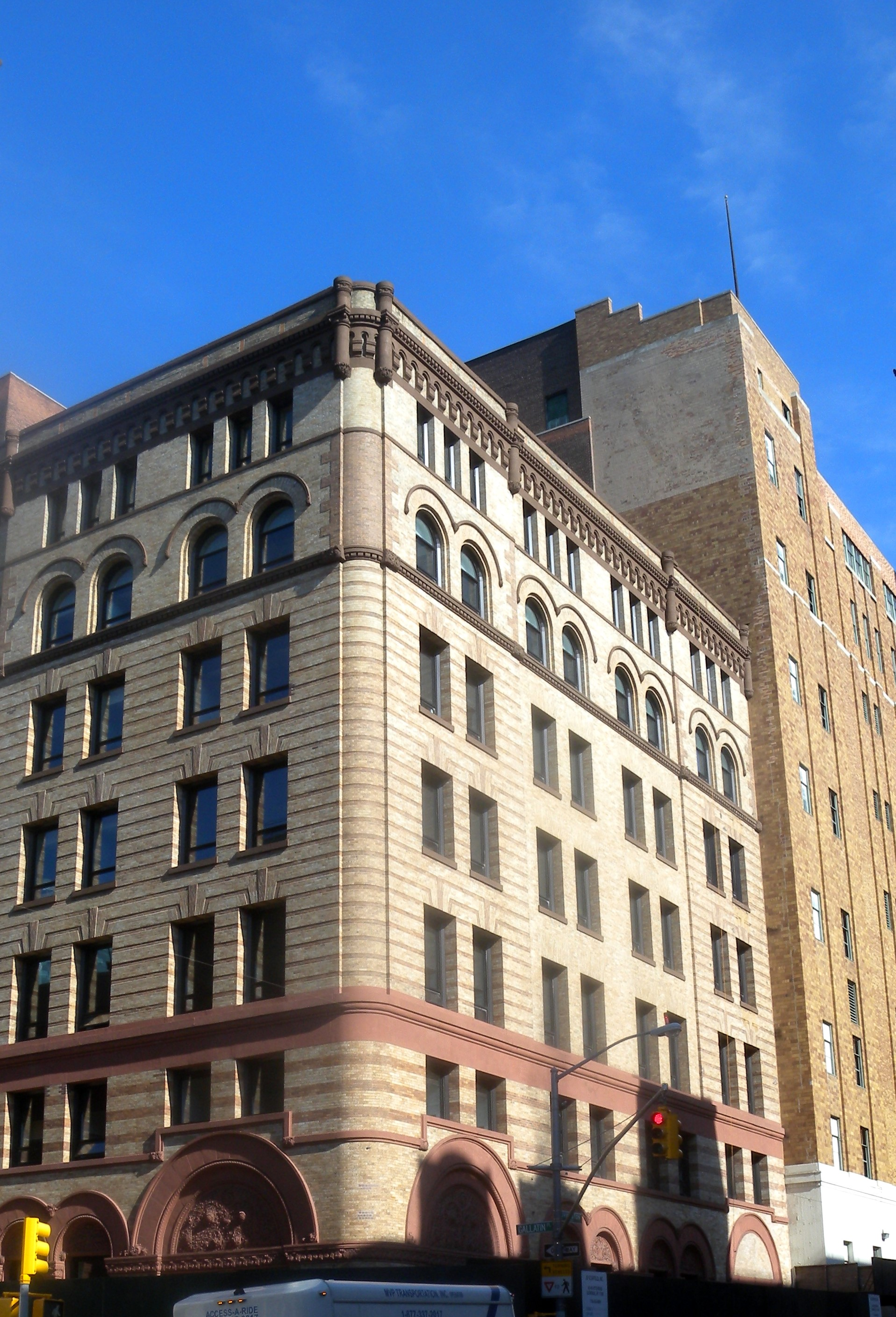
Livingston Street annex

The company's 841,000-square-foot Brooklyn flagship store was located at 422 Fulton Street, in the Fulton Street Mall.

From the beginning, the company had high aspirations. In 1885, the company hired architect George L. Morse to work on the Fulton Street store in Downtown Brooklyn. For their 1928 to 1930 renovations and additions, the company hired architects Starrett & van Vleck to build an Art Deco addition that faced Fulton, Hoyt, and Livingston Streets. In 2003, the Brooklyn Heights Association and the Municipal Art Society put the building on a list of 28 historic buildings in downtown Brooklyn that needed to be protected.

In the mid-1970s, Abraham & Straus' flagship store made mannequin modeling famous. Linda Timmins, head of the division, selected one juvenile and ingénue with "The Editorial Look" from each of the high schools across Brooklyn and Manhattan. The schools and their students were also selected for high academic standing; Manhattan Performing Arts High School student Yvette Post, Metropolitan Opera juvenile star Robert Westin, Brooklyn's Abraham Lincoln High School's Alan Jay Kahm and head cheerleader Paula Gallo, as well as Maria Russo of Catherine McAuley High School (Brooklyn) along with Anna Maria Caballos who later went on to be immortalized as the chick with the blue streaked hair in Cyndi Lauper's iconic Girls Just Want To Have Fun video were just some of the very few selected to represent the youth of New York. These "Mannequin Models" would pose for up to an hour at a time in the windows of the store as "Living Mannequins", wearing classic designer clothes and current fashions designed by Nik Nik, Pierre Cardin, and other top designers and exclusive prêt-à-porter from upscale fashion houses.

Eventually, as crowds would often stop traffic and became a safety hazard, Abraham & Straus had to move the Living Mannequins inside the store or face a stiff penalty from the city. Despite this change, the crowds still came. Each season, the young mannequin models would be allowed to move in order to do an in-store runway show for the Designer de Jour. Although it was the 1970s, the store did not feature polyester suits or non-designer outfits in these shows.

On July 16, 2014, Women's Wear Daily' reported that Macy's had stopped the renovation of its Brooklyn flagship while it considered possibly selling the property, which could be worth $300 million (~$390 million in 2024) from a developer looking to turn it into condominium apartments. It had also been reported that Macy's was considering building a new Downtown Brooklyn store.

In 2016 the upper floors were sold to Tishman Speyer, and a 3-year reconfiguration and remodeling of the sales area on the first four floors began. Those floors were in turn sold to a real estate syndicate on December 5, 2024. The location continued to underperform, and closed on March 24, 2025.

== See also ==
- List of department stores converted to Macy's
- List of defunct department stores of the United States
