= Katherine Bradford =

American artist (born 1942)

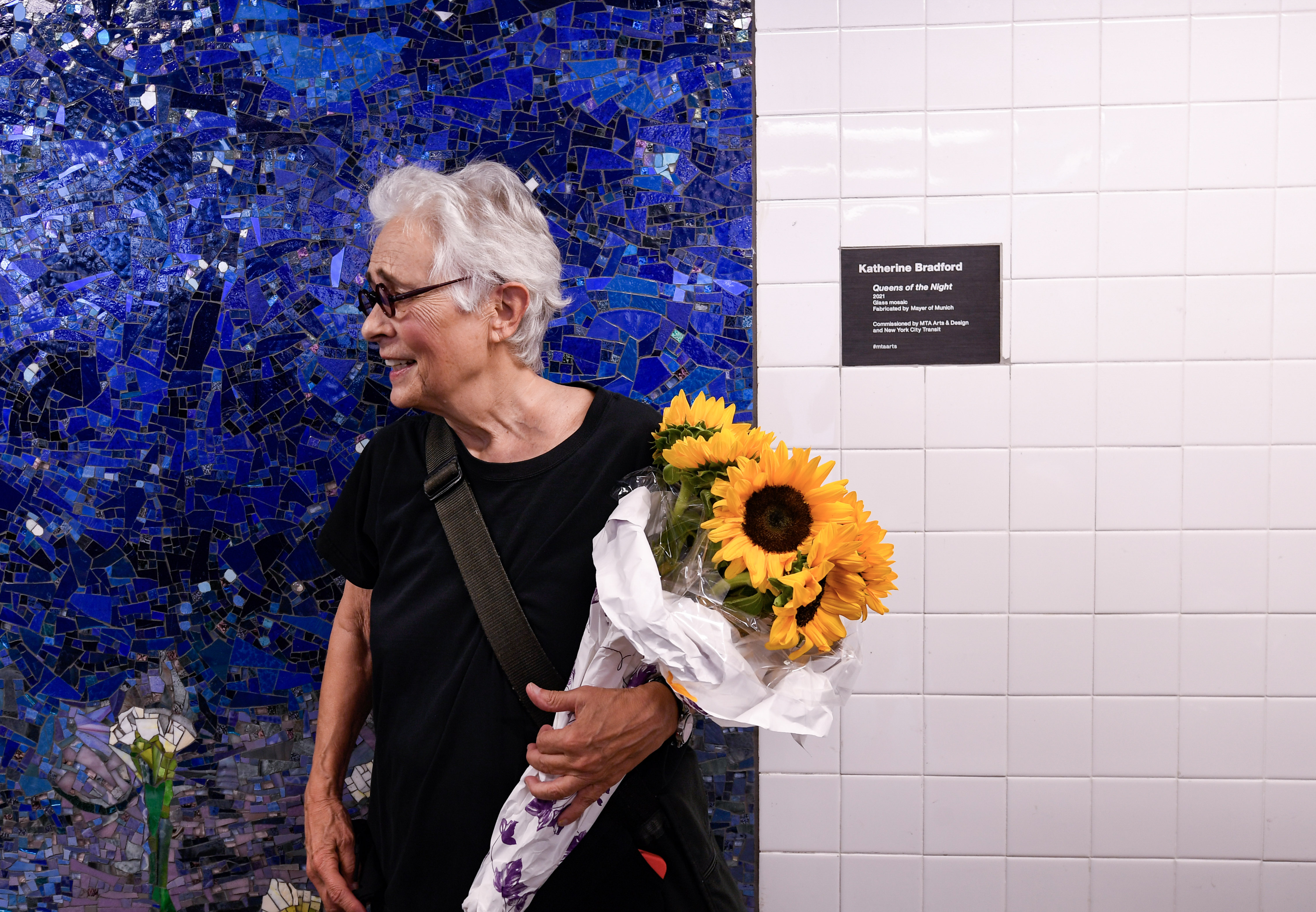
- Bradford in 2021
- Born: 1942 (age 83–84); New York City, United States
- Education: SUNY Purchase, Bryn Mawr College
- Known for: Painting
- Style: Figurative art
- Spouses: Peter A. Bradford (divorced); Jane O'Wyatt
- Children: Arthur Bradford, Laura Bradford
- Awards: John S. Guggenheim Fellowship; Joan Mitchell Foundation; American Academy of Arts and Letters; Pollock-Krasner Foundation; Rappaport Foundation Prize

Katherine Bradford (née Houston, born 1942) is an American artist based in New York City, known for figurative paintings, particularly of swimmers, that critics describe as simultaneously representational, abstract and metaphorical. She began her art career relatively late and has received her widest recognition in her seventies and eighties. Critic John Yau characterizes her work as independent of canon or genre dictates, open-ended in terms of process, and quirky in its humor and interior logic.

Bradford has exhibited internationally, at venues including MoMA PS1, Campoli Presti (London and Paris), Modern Art Museum of Fort Worth, Brooklyn Museum, Crystal Bridges Museum, and Tomio Koyama (Tokyo). She has received awards from the John Simon Guggenheim, Joan Mitchell and Pollock-Krasner foundations and the American Academy of Arts and Letters. Her work belongs to public art collections including the Metropolitan Museum of Art, Musée d'Art Moderne de Paris, Brooklyn Museum, Dallas Museum of Art, Institute of Contemporary Art, Boston and Portland Art Museum, among others.

Bradford lives with her spouse Jane O'Wyatt, in New York City and Brunswick, Maine, and works out of a studio in Williamsburg, Brooklyn.

== Early life and career ==
Bradford was born in 1942 in New York City and grew up in Connecticut. When she was a child, her mother discouraged the bohemian life of the arts, despite Bradford's grandfather, Jacques André Fouilhoux, being a prominent architect. After earning a BA at Bryn Mawr College, Bradford married Peter A. Bradford and raised twins born in 1969; her children are writer and filmmaker Arthur Bradford and Laura Bradford, who is a lawyer and law professor. When the family moved to Maine in the early 1970s, she joined an art community there that included Lois Dodd and Yvonne Jacquette, among others. Without training, she began creating abstract work centered on mark-making, the materiality of paint, and the landscape tradition. She also co-founded the Union of Maine Visual Artists (1975) and wrote art reviews for The Maine Times.

Katherine Bradford, Couple No Shirts, acrylic on canvas, 60 in × 48 in (150 cm × 120 cm), 2018.

In 1979, Bradford moved to New York City as a single mother to pursue art in closer contact with contemporary painting discourse, against the wishes of her family. She enrolled in graduate studies at SUNY Purchase (MFA, 1987) and met her future spouse, Jane O'Wyatt, in 1990. In the subsequent decade, she had solo exhibitions at the Victoria Munroe (New York), Zolla/Lieberman (Chicago), and Bernard Toale (Boston) galleries, and appeared in group shows at the Portland Museum of Art, Weatherspoon Art Museum and The Drawing Center. In the 2000s, Bradford has exhibited at the CANADA, Sperone Westwater and Pace galleries in New York, the Modern Art Museum of Fort Worth, Galerie Haverkampf (Berlin), Campoli Presti, Kaufman Repetto (Milan), and the New Orleans Biennial (Prospect.4, 2017), among others. In 2022, the first museum survey of Bradford's work, "Flying Woman," was organized by the Portland Museum of Art and traveled to the Frye Art Museum.

In addition to artmaking, Bradford taught at Illinois State University, Ohio State University and SUNY Purchase, before joining the faculties at Fashion Institute of Technology (FIT) (1995–2011) and Pennsylvania Academy of Fine Arts (1997–2012). She later taught at the Skowhegan School of Painting and Sculpture (2009) and Yale School of Art (2016–7).

== Work ==
Bradford is best known for direct, casual, color-saturated paintings of swimmers, boats, and caped flying figures that are noted for their paint handling, rich color-field surfaces, theatrical sense of light, and oblique themes and narratives. Critics suggest that she weights color, iconography and narrative equally in her work, privileging exploration and formal and metaphorical possibility over conclusiveness.

Art in America's Robert Berlind characterizes her method as "predicated on a trust in possibilities beyond her conscious intentions or formal inclinations, and on a responsiveness to what shows up on the canvas." Bradford has said that she does not begin with a plan, but rather draws on her ongoing vocabulary of forms, discovering each image through the painting process and intuition. Artcritical editor David Cohen writes that she combines "the peculiar poetic charm and nonchalance of provisional painting with the energy, seriousness, and resolve of classic abstract painting"; he compares her formal evolution to Philip Guston's ("high-abstraction-to-low-realism") but differentiates her treatment of subjects as romantic, heartfelt, and whimsical.

=== Early painting ===
Bradford's early, modestly scaled paintings were largely abstract, employing irregular grids and rows of pictographic dots, spirals and crude letterforms set against vaporous surfaces akin to the meditative work of Mark Rothko. Art in America's Stephen Westfall wrote that the paintings charted "a laconic course between abstraction, representation and collage," while New York Times critic Roberta Smith described their schematization of nature as "small, ruggedly made abstractions that are at once poetic and humorous." Eileen Myles situated Bradford among a group of mainly female artists "reconstituting painting" through "wit, subversion and bad geometry."

In her late 1990s work, Bradford moved closer to iconographic representation, depicting box forms and figures with bold, heavy lines and a comedic or darkly humorous tone.

Bradford received wider attention with work in the 2000s centered on marine imagery: ethereal ocean liners, sailboats, sea battles, and other-worldly aliens or vulnerable figures that suggested spiritual or intellectual illumination emerging out of darkness (e.g., Lake Sisters, 2004, Traveler, 2004 and Hydra Head, 2006). Critics characterize these paintings as both mysterious and direct, with simple, ambiguously scaled and combined elements, fluid sea-sky realms, and surfaces of abraded brushstrokes, dabs and scumbling that evoke rather define form. James Kalm describes them as combining "New England romantic realism with transparent fields of zippy new age color and subversive figuration," unified by unfussy, direct brushwork.

=== Mid-career painting: ships and boats ===
Katherine Bradford, Desire for Transport, oil on canvas, 54 in × 72 in (140 cm × 180 cm), 2007.

John Yau identified paintings in Bradford's 2007 show (Edward Thorp), such as Desire for Transport—a flotilla of seven boats floats carrying mysterious gowned figures on a blue-green sea—as "breakthrough" works for Bradford that synthesized "the bluntness of primitive painting, the directness of gestural mark-making [and] the gamut of expressionism" to create a sense of expectancy; New York Times critic Ken Johnson wrote that the painted ships suggest "utopian collectivity, promising voyages of kindred spirits to unknown shores."

Critics observe that Bradford's later marine paintings move further from representational picture-space toward more open-ended, abstract "painting-space." In this work, unearthly lit, foreshortened, monolithic ships read equally as abstract, irregular trapezoids alluding to Minimalist sculpture, set against grounds that function as moody color fields and slabs of pure color (e.g., Titanic Orange Sea and Sargasso, both 2012).

=== Superman paintings ===
Katherine Bradford, Superman Responds, Night, oil on canvas, 48 in × 36 in (122 cm × 91 cm), 2011.

In the early 2010s, Bradford began painting plunging figures and idiosyncratic, caped "Superman" characters, set against soft color fields or atmospheric matte skies marked with star bursts and zigzags suggesting paths (e.g., Superman Responds, Night, 2011). Her superhero images are described variously as "luminous and sumptuously tactile," goofy, frumpy, vulnerable, and caught in a tentative state between flying and diving. Robert Berlind characterized their style as "at once offhand and emblematic"; David Cohen wrote that Superman Responds (2011) conveys "a convincing if gender-bent voluptuousness" in a few carefree-seeming dabs with "disconcerting observational acumen" and anatomical precision.

Writers differentiate the Superman paintings from Pop, cartoon or ironic work in both appearance and attitude, noting their qualities of warmth, vulnerability, reverie and metaphorical openness. John Yau identifies them as knowing meditations on heroism, history and masculinity as "simultaneously powerful and impotent, idiotic and funny." Other writers, however, suggest they represent new symbols of strength in vulnerability, visionary individualism, personal exploration, and perhaps, Bradford herself.

=== Later painting: swimmers and other figurative works ===
Katherine Bradford, Fear of Waves, oil on canvas, 84 in × 72 in (210 cm × 180 cm), 2015.

Bradford's later work (e.g., her "Fear of Waves" exhibition, 2016) has evolved toward larger, more vibrant work, that Yau writes "transform[s] the whimsical into the catastrophic, its polar opposite, without losing [its] offhand humor." Often painted in water-soluble acrylic—ideal for mimicking the effects of water in images of swimmers, bathers and surfers—these paintings take more formal risks, with complex compositions of multiple figures and divided grounds of otherworldly, nocturnal planetary-oceanic environments.

In the near-monochrome painting Blue Swimmers (2015), Bradford submerges and crops ghostly, awkwardly human figures within washes of blue or green, complicating figure-ground relationships while alluding to themes of birth, life, and possibly, death. Other paintings, like the diagonally divided, vertical Fear of Waves (2016), introduce an element of uncertainty or calamity whose specific threat and outcome remains a mystery; the bird's-eye view work depicts a crowd of swimmers fleeing giant, leftward-moving waves toward through a turquoise impasto, conveying a sense of insignificance against the unfathomable.

Critics such as Lilly Wei identify Bradford's "Friends and Strangers" (2018) and "Legs and Stripes" (2019) exhibitions as departures in terms of palette, process and collective themes, such as race, sexuality, gender and identity. The former shows were characterized by vibrant pinks, magentas, purples and yellows, directly drawn thick outline, monumental scale, and the use of gesture and facial direction rather than expression to convey emotion. In paintings such as Olympiad (2018), she experimented with colors mixed with fluorescent magenta paint and improbable arrangements of figures that balanced interests in how subjects fit together as abstract compositional elements and as potential social communities. The painting Couple No Shirts (2018) depicted an androgynous, economically drawn couple that implied a sense of universality while examining assumptions regarding categorization and looking.

Katherine Bradford, Bus Stop, acrylic on canvas, 72 in × 60 in (180 cm × 150 cm), 2021.

In solo shows at Canada ("Mother Paintings," 2021; "Arms and the Sea," 2023; "Communal Table," 2025), and the Carpenter Center for the Visual Arts and Hall Art Foundation, Bradford exhibited more moody, figurative paintings depicting varying degrees of familial intimacy and maternal feeling. Critics considered these paintings a further step in a narrative trajectory toward interpersonal relationships—and for the first time—outside events, such as the COVID-19 pandemic. Her figures remained ambiguous—crudely drawn in contour lines, they diffused into Rothko-like abstract fields of color—but dominated their frames more, connecting through spare gestures and contact that conveyed themes of vulnerability, longtime affection and heroic care (e.g., Fever, Mother's Lap and Mother Carry).

In 2024, Karen Wilkin described Bradford's recent work as her "most complex to date," commenting, "She constructs her paintings with firm planes of color that are somehow brought to life so that we read them as figures. For all their generous scale and apparent simplifications, which make [them] eloquent from a distance, their rich orchestrations of surface, full-throttle color, and unpredictable imagery require (and reward) extended close attention."

== Awards, commissions and collections ==
Bradford has been recognized with a Guggenheim Fellowship (2011), a Rappaport Foundation Prize for New England artists, and awards from the Joan Mitchell Foundation (2012), American Academy of Arts and Letters (2011, 2005), and Pollock-Krasner Foundation (2000). In 2021, MTA Arts & Design commissioned Bradford to make glass mosaic murals for the First Avenue station of the New York City Subway's L train. They include three large works collectively titled Queens of the Night—which depict figures in dancelike poses against a sapphire blue background—and two smaller works of flying superheroes, titled Superhero Responds.

Bradford's work belongs to the public collections of the Metropolitan Museum of Art, Musée d'Art Moderne de Paris, Brooklyn Museum, Hirshhorn Museum and Sculpture Garden, Dallas Museum of Art, Menil Collection, Portland Art Museum, Addison Gallery of American Art, Baltimore Museum of Art, Cantor Arts Center, Hall Art Foundation, ICA Boston, Pennsylvania Academy of the Fine Arts, Portland Museum of Art (Maine), Rose Art Museum, Tang Museum, and Worcester Art Museum, among others.
