= Frank Schmalleger =

American criminologist (born 1947)

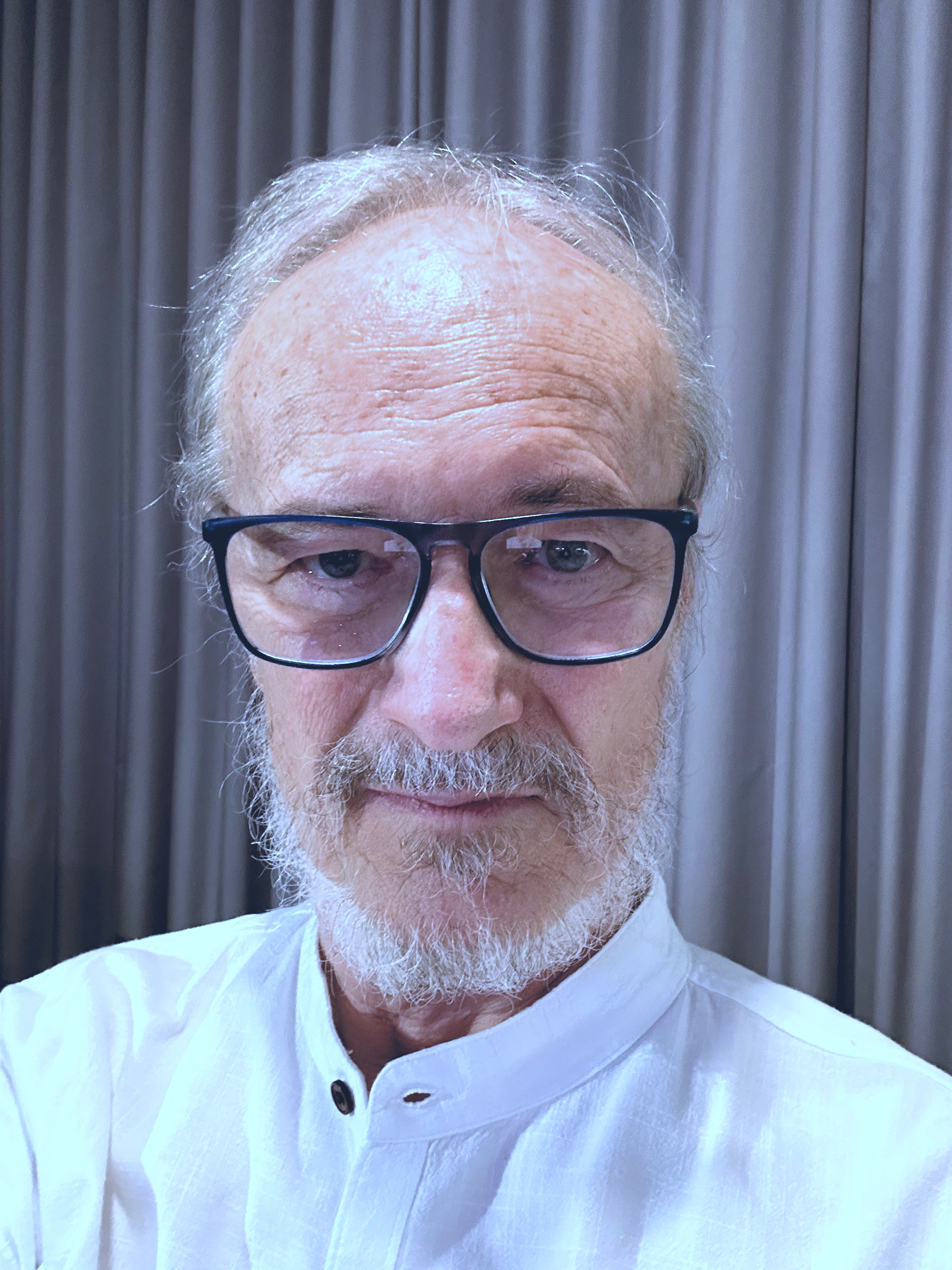
- Born: 1947 (age 78–79)
- Education: Ohio State University; University of Notre Dame
- Occupations: Criminologist; Academic; Author
- Spouse: Ellen "Willow" Szirandi Schmalleger
- Website: schmalleger.com

Frank Schmalleger (born 1947) is an American criminologist, academic, and author. He is a Distinguished Professor Emeritus at the University of North Carolina at Pembroke.

== Early life and education ==
Schmalleger was born in 1947. He received his master's degree in 1970 and a doctorate in sociology with a specialization in criminology in 1974, from the Ohio State University. While pursuing graduate studies at the Ohio State University, Schmalleger joined the U.S. Army Reserve Officer Training Program (ROTC) and was recognized as a Distinguished Military Cadet upon graduation. He also holds a BBA degree from the University of Notre Dame.

Schmalleger is married to Ellen "Willow" Szirandi Schmalleger.

== Career ==
Schmalleger served in the U.S. Army during the Vietnam War and continued his service in the U.S. Army Reserves until his discharge in 1979, attaining the rank of Captain.

Schmalleger's academic career began in 1970 when he worked as a teaching associate in the Department of Sociology at the Ohio State University from 1970 until 1973.

From 1973 to 1975, Schmalleger worked as an assistant professor of sociology in the Department of Sociology and Social Welfare at Ohio Dominican College in Columbus, Ohio.

In 1975, Schmalleger joined the University of North Carolina at Pembroke (UNCP) as an assistant professor in the Department of Sociology, Social Work, and Criminal Justice, specializing in criminal justice. He became an associate professor in 1978 and professor in 1987, after receiving tenure in 1981. Schmalleger chaired the department from 1978 to 1994.

Schmalleger also taught courses as an adjunct professor at Webster University in St. Louis, Missouri, where he contributed to the development of the university's graduate program in security administration and loss prevention, and taught courses for over a decade. Later, he also taught in the New School for Social Research's online graduate program, contributing to the establishment of early electronic classrooms for distance learning through computer telecommunications.

Schmalleger was the founding editor and executive editor of the journal Criminal Justice Studies from 1985 to 1990. He also reviewed books for The Journal of Psychiatry & Law.

Schmalleger retired from teaching in 1994. After his retirement, he founded the Justice Research Association, where he serves as director.

Schmalleger has authored dozens of books on criminology and criminal justice, including Criminal Justice Today (Pearson); Criminal Justice: A Brief Introduction (Pearson); Criminology Today (Pearson); Constitutional Law Today (Cognella); and Corrections in the 21st Century (McGraw-Hill). An early book, The Social Basis of Criminal Justice, was reviewed in 2006 in the Justice Quarterly. His introductory texts have been dubbed "The Gold Standard" among criminal justice texts by his publisher, Pearson Publishing.

Schmalleger is also an active "ham" radio operator, holding the call sign K3UND.

== Bibliography ==
- Schmalleger, Frank (1981). The Social Basis of Criminal Justice
- Schmalleger, Frank (1983). A History of Corrections
- Schmalleger, Frank (1990). Ethics in Criminal Justice
- Schmalleger, Frank (1991). Computers in Criminal Justice
- Schmalleger, Frank (1991). Criminal Justice Ethics
- Schmalleger, Frank (1991). Finding Criminal Justice in the Library
- Schmalleger, Frank (1994). Career Paths: A Guide to Jobs in Federal Law Enforcement
- Schmalleger, Frank (1996). Trial of the Century: People of the State of California vs. Orenthal James Simpson
- Schmalleger, Frank (1997). Crime and the Justice System in America: An Encyclopedia
- Schmalleger, Frank; Pittaro, Michael (2009). Crimes of the Internet
- Schmalleger, Frank; Humphrey, John A. (2021). Deviant Behavior
- Schmalleger, Frank; Bartollas, Clemens; Sharma, Hemant (2024). Juvenile Delinquency
- Schmalleger, Frank; Siegel, Larry; Worrall, John (2022). Courts and Criminal Justice in America
- Schmalleger, Frank; Feldmeier, John (2022). American Criminal Procedure Today
- Schmalleger, Frank (2022). Criminal Law Today
- Schmalleger, Frank (2023). Criminal Justice Today
- Schmalleger, Frank (2023). Criminal Justice: An Introduction
- Schmalleger, Frank; Scheb, John M.; Sharma, Hemant (2023). Constitutional Law Today
- Schmalleger, Frank; Smykla, John (2024). Corrections in the 21st Century
- Schmalleger, Frank; Worrall, John (2024). Policing
