= Wadleigh =

Wadleigh is a surname. Notable people with the surname include:

- Bainbridge Wadleigh (1831–1891), American politician
- George H. Wadleigh (1842–1927), United States Navy admiral
- Julian Wadleigh (1904–1994), American economist and Soviet spy
- Lydia Fowler Wadleigh (1817-1888), American educator
- Michael Wadleigh (born 1939), American film director and cinematographer
