= Geffen =

Geffen or Gefen may refer to:

- Geffen (surname)
- Gefen, a moshav in central Israel
- Gefen Primo (born 2000), Israeli judoka
- Gefen LLC, an American electronics hardware manufacturing company
- Gefen Publishing House, an English language publishing firm located in Jerusalem, Israel
- The Geffen Film Company, a motion picture distributor and production company founded by David Geffen
- Geffen Records, a record label founded by David Geffen
- Geffen Playhouse, a theater in Los Angeles, California, named after David Geffen
- Geffen, Netherlands, a town in the Dutch municipality of Oss
- Geffen (Ragnarok Online), a town in the fantasy world of Ragnarok Online
