= Kathy Goldman =

American activist (1932–2024)

Catherine Vera Friedman (January 15, 1932 – March 5, 2024) was an American activist. She was the founder of the Community Food Resource Center, which focused on providing food to hundreds of thousands of low-income New York City residents.

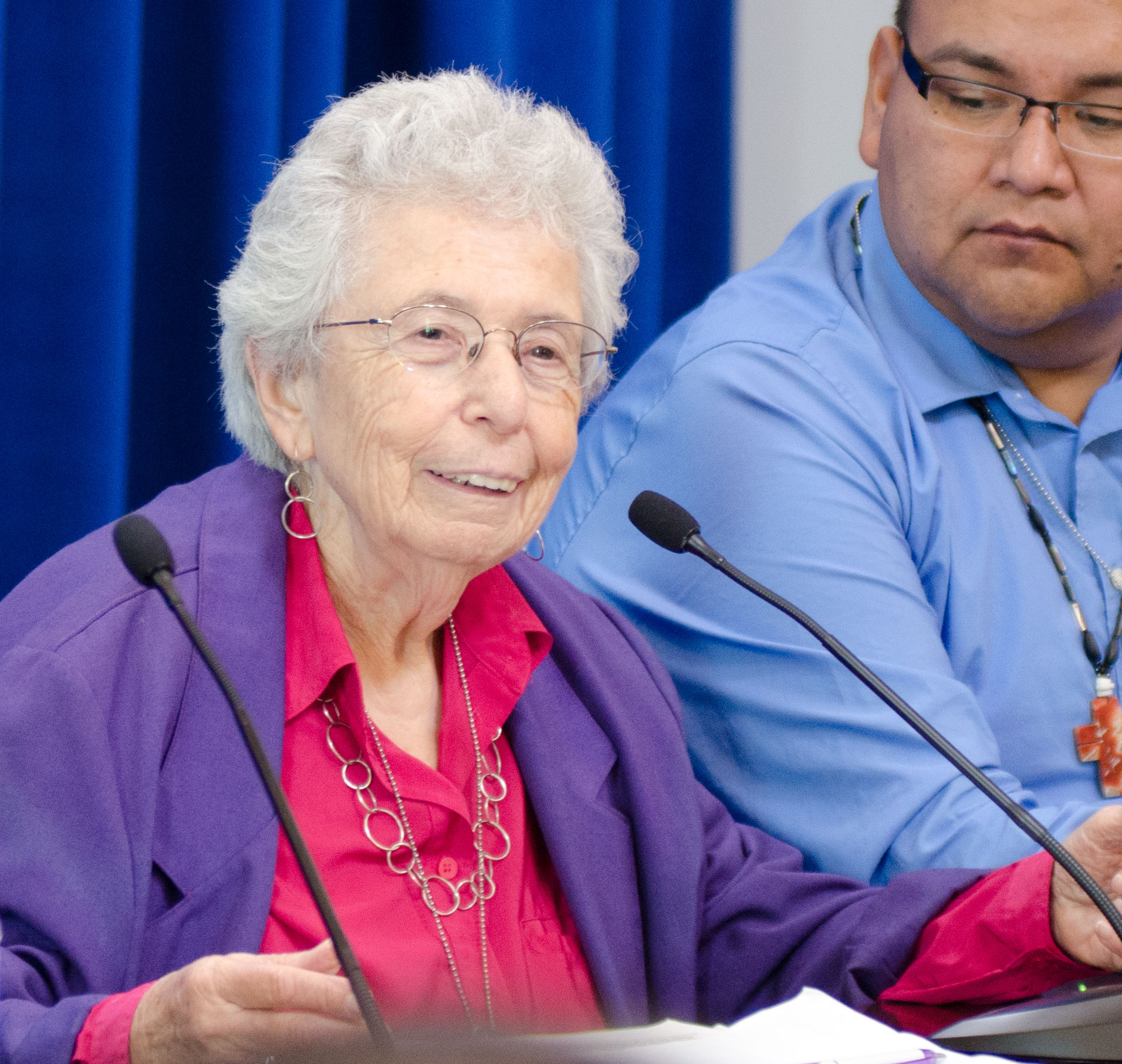
Goldman in 2012

Her work on helping to relieve hunger and poverty began in 1965. She served as an executive director of the Community Food Resource Center (now part of the Food Bank For New York City) until 2003.

Goldman died in Brooklyn on March 5, 2024, at the age of 92.

== History ==
Goldman was born to and raised by Jewish immigrant parents.

In the mid-1960s, she joined United Bronx Parents, an effort to change public schools in Bronx.
