= Lillian López =

American librarian

- Born: 1925; Salinas, Puerto Rico
- Died: 2005; New York, New York
- Occupation: Librarian
- Employer: New York Public Library
- Known for: Coordinator of NYPL Office of Special Services, Founding Director of the South Bronx Project

Lillian López (1925–2005) was a Puerto Rican activist and librarian. She worked for the New York Public Library from 1960 until 1985, spearheading the South Bronx Project, an effort to revitalize communities in the Bronx through library workshops and outreach, and also advocating for library services for under served communities, especially speakers of languages other than English.

== Early life and education ==
López was born in Salinas, Puerto Rico in 1925, and spent her childhood in the nearby town of Ponce. in 1935, at the age of 10, she, her younger sister and her mother moved to New York City, where they were reunited with Lillian's older sister, Evelina Lopez Antonetty. López graduated from Washington Irving High School in 1944 and enrolled at Hunter College in 1952, earning a B.A. degree in 1959. She enrolled in the Columbia University Library Science program in 1960, and worked as a library trainee with the New York Public Library while she earned her MLS degree.

== New York Public Library ==
López spent her entire career as a librarian working for the New York Public Library system, retiring in 1985 after 25 years of service. She was involved in libraries in Manhattan and in the Bronx, and advocated particularly to increase library services for Spanish-speaking communities. She worked closely with Pura Belpré, the first Puerto Rican librarian in the NYPL system, and a children's author and puppeteer.

In 1967, she helped to found the South Bronx Project, an outreach program by the NYPL to increase community services for patrons in the borough, with a special emphasis on black, immigrant and other under served populations. The project secured over $200,000 in funding in its first year from the Library Services and Construction Act. In 1972, she became the coordinator of the Special Services Office with the NYPL, a system-wide position that allowed her to implement projects similar to the South Bronx Project in other New York City neighborhoods. In 1979, she became the Bronx Borough Coordinator, a position she held until her retirement in 1985.

== Labor and education advocacy ==
Throughout her career, López was involved with labor advocacy programs, particularly labor rights for women of color. Her elder sister Evalina Antonetty was the founder of the United Bronx Parents, an advocacy and community outreach program that focuses on educational and social services for African-American and Latino students in the Bronx. Like her sister, López was also dedicated to creating and providing access to educational resources for Spanish-speakers and other minority groups.

== Retirement and death ==
López retired from her position at the New York Public Library in 1985, after working there for 25 years, and died in 2005 at the age of 80.

== See also ==
- List of Puerto Ricans
