= Food Bank For New York City =

US non-profit organization

- Formation: 1983; 43 years ago
- Founder: Kathy Goldman
- Type: Non-profit organization
- Region served: New York City
- Chief executive officer: Leslie Gordon
- Volunteers: 1,200
- Website: www.foodbanknyc.org

Food Bank For New York City is a non-profit social services organization and the major hunger-relief organization working against hunger in the five boroughs. Its aim is to organize food, information and support for needy citizens of New York City.

== History ==
The Food Bank For New York City was founded in 1983. It has a network of approximately 1,200 emergency and community food providers, including soup kitchens, food pantries, shelters, low-income day care centers, as well as senior, youth and rehabilitation centers. Food Bank helps to provide approximately 400,000 free meals daily. Since its inception, it has collected, warehoused and distributed more than 744 million pounds of food.

Food Bank has a staff of over 100 full-time employees and is governed by a voluntary Board of Directors.

Food Bank is a certified member of Feeding America and the New York State Food Bank Association. In July 2007, the Food Bank acquired FoodChange, Inc.

== Mission and services ==
Founded on research showing that approximately two million New Yorkers are at risk of hunger and that more than half of city households with children would not be able to afford food for their families within three months of the loss of a job or household income, the Food Bank works to fight hunger with food donated from, among other sources, the Fulton Fish Market, The Hunts Point meat and produce markets, the Hunts Point Cooperative Market, government agencies and America's Second Harvest. In addition, Food Bank runs Kid's Café, an after-school program providing free meals to children. According to the organization's 2013 Annual Report, Food Bank is the largest anti-hunger network in the United States, providing "food and services responsible for 72.5 million meals a year". According to the 2017 Annual Report, Food Bank has provides 1.3 billion needed meals since its foundation in 1983.

== Honors and support ==
In 2005 and 2006, the Food Bank received a four-star rating from Charity Navigator, the largest charity evaluator in the United States.

The Food Bank was also recognized by America's Second Harvest with a second "Mighty Apple" award for most produce collected and distributed within the network, as well as with their first "Model Fundraising Campaign of the Year" award for the 2006 CANS Film Festival. The Food Bank was also honored with the Mighty Apple Award in 2009, 2010 and 2011.

In 2007, it was among over 530 New York City arts and social service institutions to receive part of a $30 million grant from the Carnegie Corporation, which was made possible through a donation by New York City mayor Michael Bloomberg.

In 2011 Food Bank was listed on Forbes magazine 200 Largest Charities list.

In 2014 Food Bank was inducted into the Feeding Americas 2014 Advocacy Hall of Fame.

In 2015 The Food Research & Action Center (FRAC) awarded Food Bank-chaired NYC Task Force with its Innovative Anti-Hunger Work award.

In 2016 Food Bank was honored with the John Dewey Award and was named as Company of the Year.

== See also ==
- Food bank
- List of food banks
- Soup kitchen
