= Cornelia Foster Bradford =

American philanthropist and social reformer

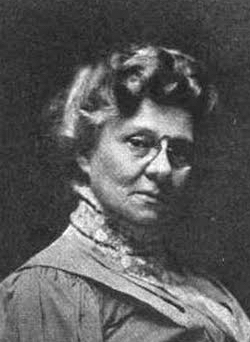
- Cornelia Foster Bradford, from a 1914 publication
- Born: December 4, 1847; Granby, New York
- Died: January 15, 1935 (aged 87); Montclair, New Jersey
- Occupation: Social reformer
- Known for: Whittier House, a settlement house in Jersey City, New Jersey

Cornelia Foster Bradford (December 4, 1847 – January 15, 1935) was an American philanthropist and social reformer. She established a settlement house in Jersey City, New Jersey, in 1894.

== Early life ==
Cornelia Foster Bradford was born in Granby, New York, the daughter of Rev. Benjamin Franklin Bradford and Mary Amory Howe Bradford. She was descended from William Bradford of Plymouth. Her father was a Congregational minister and an abolitionist who assisted people escaping slavery on their way to Canada. Cornelia F. Bradford graduated from Houghton Seminary in Clinton, New York.

== Career ==
Bradford visited London as a young woman, and became interested in the settlement movement after a visit to Toynbee Hall and a stay at Mansfield House in East London. On her return to the United States, she worked at Hull House in Chicago. In 1893 she moved to New Jersey, and the following year opened Whittier House, a settlement house in the Paulus Hook neighborhood of Jersey City. Through Whittier House and the New Jersey Association of Neighborhood Workers, she established the city's first women's club, neighborhood watch, legal aid society, free kindergarten, and playground; the settlement house also offered a library, a medical dispensary, a kitchen, a gymnasium, classes, sports, performance space, and a summer camp. Her programs were open to city residents of all races and ethnicities. She helped Juliet Clannon Cushing to organize the New Jersey Consumers League and the Child Protective League. She was president of the New Jersey Conference for Social Welfare; she also served a term as vice president of the National Federation of Settlements.

In 1912, she became the first woman appointed to the Jersey City Board of Education. She worked for the establishment of a school in Paulus Hook, culminating in the opening of Public School 16 (PS 16) in 1916. In 1923 she was honored with an honorary master's degree from the New Jersey College of Women.

== Personal life and legacy ==
Bradford retired in 1926. She died in Montclair, New Jersey, from heart failure in 1935, aged 87. PS 16 was renamed Cornelia F. Bradford School in 1944, in her memory. In 2018, a portrait of Bradford which had hung at the school since its founding was restored and re-dedicated to mark the school's centennial, with a program remembering Bradford's work. The Boys & Girls Clubs of Hudson County also trace their origins to Bradford's work at Whittier House. The Whittier House Social Settlement Papers are archived at the New Jersey Historical Society. A recent exhibit on New Jersey women's history at the Meadowlands Museum featured a display on Cornelia Foster Bradford.

Bradford's niece, Stella Stevens Bradford (1871–1959), became a medical doctor focused on physical rehabilitation and therapies for children affected by polio, tuberculosis, and other diseases.
