= Wadleigh High School for Girls =

Public school in New York City

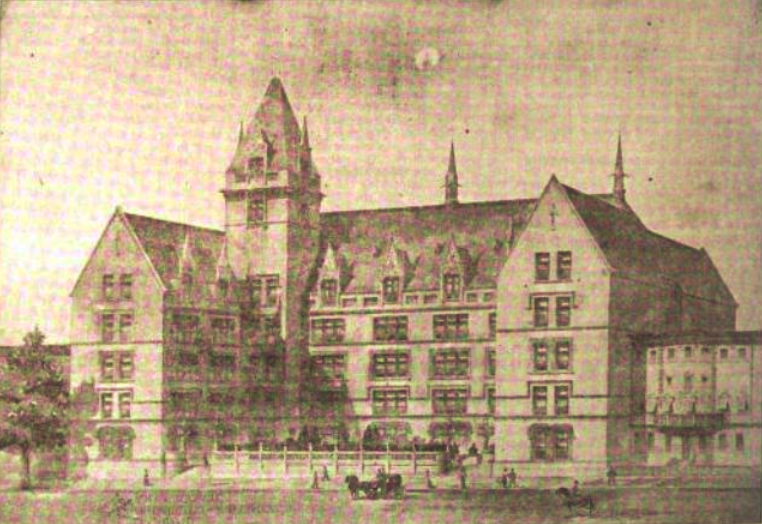

Location
- 215 West 114th Street; New York City 10026; 40°48′10″N 73°57′15″W

Information
- Other name: The Wadleigh School
- School type: Public
- Established: 1897
- Gender: Girls

The Wadleigh High School for Girls was established by the New York City Board of Education in 1897 and moved into its new building in Harlem in September 1902. It was the first public high school for girls in New York City. At the time, public secondary education for girls was considered highly novel and perhaps a bit scandalous. Newspapers considered it newsworthy enough to devote many stories to describing classroom scenes of girls receiving "higher" education. The building is shared by several schools including the Wadleigh Secondary School for the Performing and Visual Arts, the Frederick Douglas Academy, and Success Academy Harlem West.

== Namesake ==
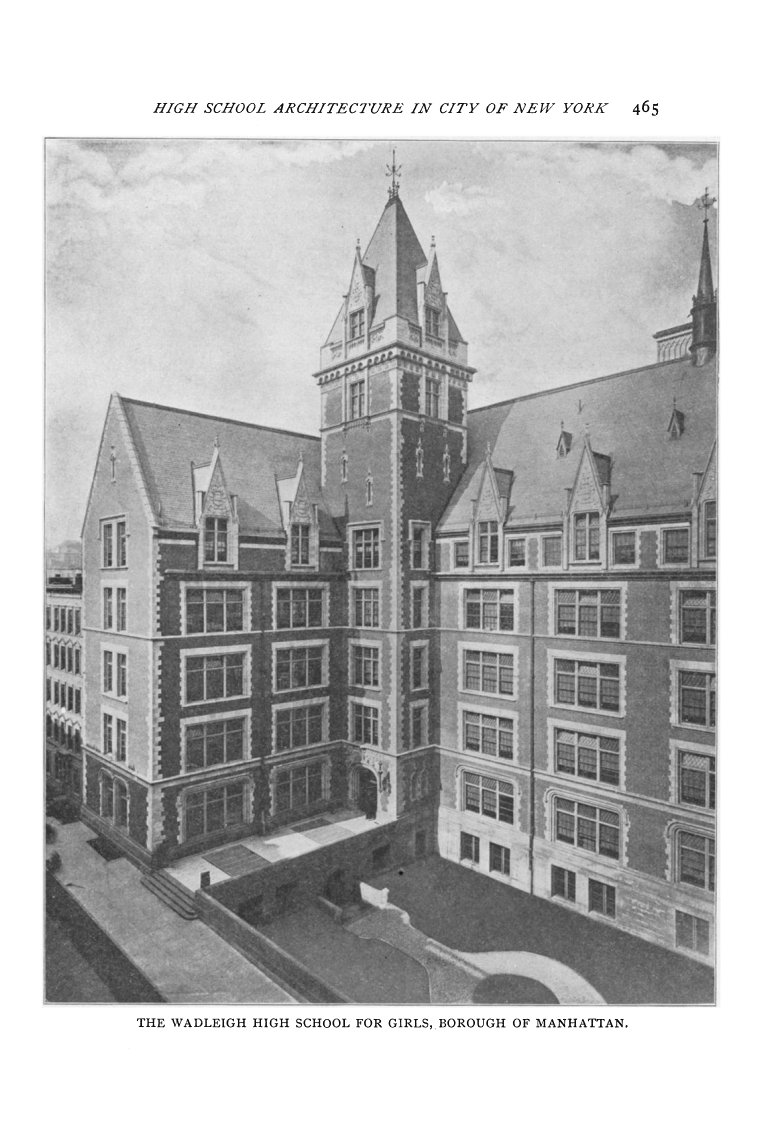
Photograph of the Wadleigh High School for Girls from shortly after its completion in 1902.

The school was named for Lydia Fowler Wadleigh (1817–1888), who was a pioneer in higher education for women. In 1856 she established the 12th Street Advanced School for Girls in the face of "bitter opposition," according to The New York Times in 1904. Later in her career, she assisted Thomas Hunter in the creation and was the first "Lady Superintendent" of the New York Normal College, later known as Hunter College.

== Building ==
Located at 215 West 114th Street in the West 114th Street Historic District, the building was constructed during 1901–02 and opened for the 1902–03 school year. The total cost for the land, building, and equipment was $900,000. At the time of its construction, it was praised by The New York Times as "the finest high school building in the world."

Five stories tall, the building had such wonders of the times as electric elevators and central forced-air ventilation. The architect of the school was C. B. J. Snyder, who, as Superintendent of School Buildings for New York City, was responsible for the design of most of the New York City public schools of the time, including such notable buildings as DeWitt Clinton High School and Erasmus Hall High School. The brick-and-limestone school, done in a French Renaissance style, featured an imposing tower, stained-glass windows, and a series of terra-cotta bas-relief shields with patriotic American motifs. In 1993 a renovation, costing $47 million, was completed. The following year, Wadleigh was designated a New York City Landmark.

== Social history ==
Although 85% of the population in New York City at the time of its opening were either immigrants or children of immigrants, from its beginnings Wadleigh took pride in turning its students into "gentlewomen" who could assume their rightful place as contributors to American society. The nature of that contribution was subject to the temper of the times. In 1910, Mrs. O.H.P. Belmont (see Alva Belmont), a wealthy socialite, offered $100 in prizes to the girls of Wadleigh who could write the best essays on the subject of woman's suffrage. The New York City Board of Education decided not to allow the contest to proceed with a view towards stopping the spread of woman suffrage propaganda in the public schools. Later, in 1937, Dr. Harold G. Campbell, Superintendent of Schools, assured a gathering in celebration of the school's 40th anniversary that "we at the Board of Education will do our best to keep Wadleigh as a school for ladies."

== Neighborhood and subsequent history of the school ==
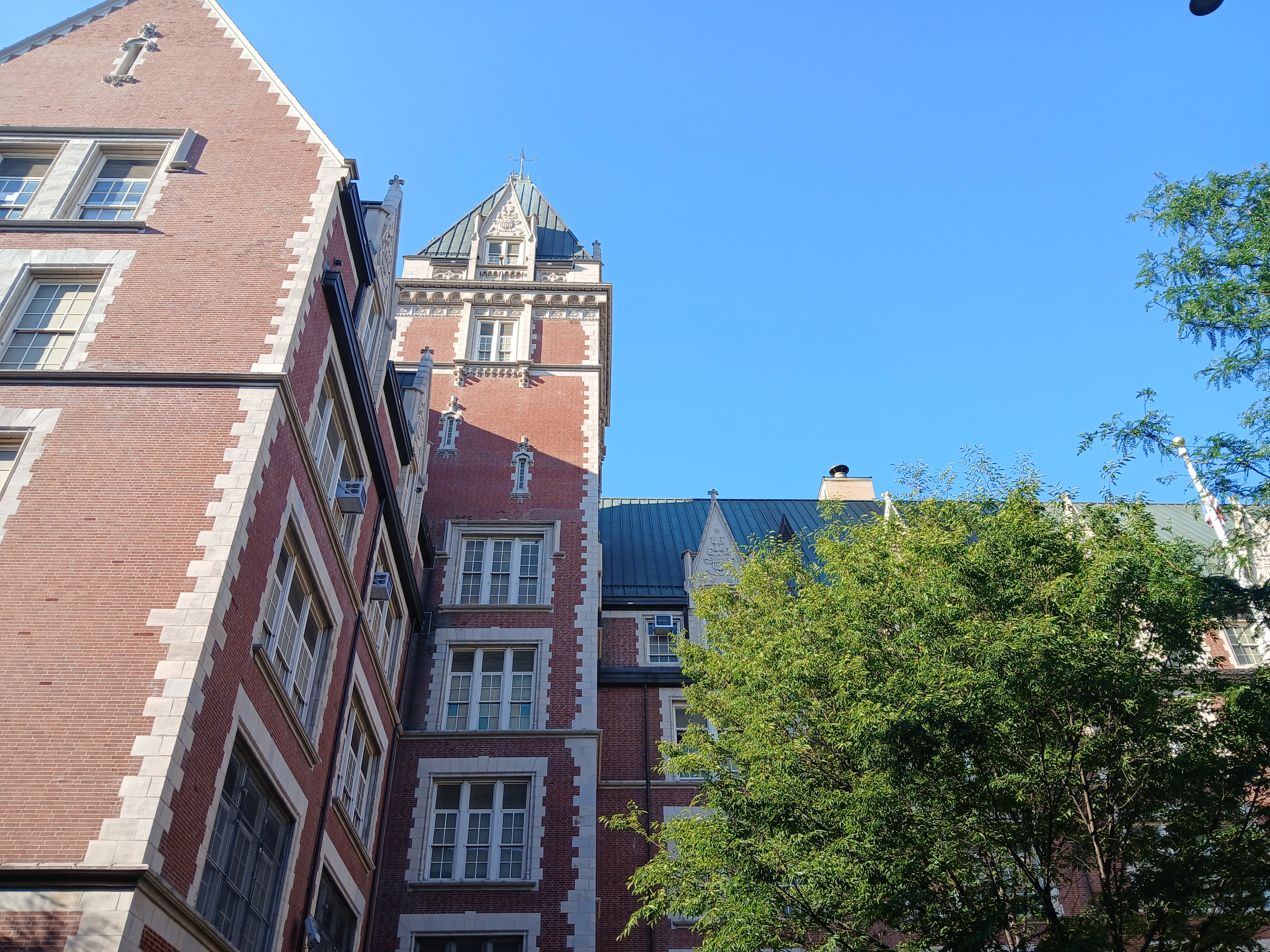
The facade seen in 2026

When the Wadleigh High School for Girls opened in 1902, the Harlem neighborhood in upper Manhattan where Wadleigh was located was a fashionable middle and upper class, mostly white and Jewish, area. Over the subsequent decades, Harlem became a center of black life in New York City, but it also became a more economically disadvantaged area as well. In 1937, Dr. John L. Tildsey, retired Associate Superintendent of Schools, was quoted in the New York Times as saying that the students at Wadleigh "have to pass through a neighborhood where gentlewomen do not like to pass." He further urged parents to "bring pressure on the Board of Education and the Board of Estimate for a new site on the upper West Side where they can send their girls in confidence and security." At the end of the 1953–54 school year, Wadleigh was closed. It reopened in 1956 after some renovation as a co-educational junior high school. In 1993, after a complete renovation, Wadleigh became a co-educational secondary school. In the early decades of the 21st century, the building was shared among several distinct schools. These include the Wadleigh Secondary School for the Performing and Visual Arts, the Frederick Douglass Academy II, and Success Academy Harlem West.

== Alumnae ==
Alumnae include:

- Evelina Lopez Antonetty (1922–1984), civil rights activist
- Vinnette Justine Carroll (1922–2002), playwright, actress, and theatre director
- Alice Childress (1916–1994), novelist, playwright, and actress
- Lady Bird Cleveland (1926–2015), artist
- Constance Dowling (1920–1969), actress
- Virginia Brown Faire (1904–1980), actress
- Vinie Burrows (1924–2023), actress, director, producer
- Yetta Dorothea Geffen (1891–1986), actress, journalist, musician, theatrical manager
- Wynne Gibson (1898–1987), actress
- Aurora Greely (1905–1983), dancer and choreographer
- Edith Gregor Halpert (1900–1970), American art dealer and collector
- Lillian Hellman (1905–1984), playwright
- Jane Margueretta Hoey (1892–1968), social worker
- Rosella Kanarik (1909–2014), American mathematics professor and educator
- Dorothea Lange (1895–1965), photojournalist
- Dr. Margaret Morgan Lawrence (1914–2019), the first Black female psychoanalyst and psychiatrist
- Dina Melicov (1905–1969), sculptor
- Dora Cole Norman (1888–1939), educator, dancer, theater producer, playwright and sportswoman
- Molly Parnis (1899–1992), fashion designer
- Bernice Robinson (1914–1994), civil rights activist
- Anna Rosenberg (1899–1983), civil servant
- Isabel Sanford (1917–2004), actress
- Carmen Velma Shepperd (1910–1997)
- Eulalie Spence (1894–1981), playwright and teacher
- Jean Stapleton (1923–2013), actress
- Gitel Steed (1914–1977), anthropologist/photographer
- Olivia P. Stokes (1916–2002), religious educator, ordained Baptist minister, author, administrator, and civil rights activist
- Arlein Ford Straw (1920–2009), class of 1936, composer
- Wezlynn Tildon (1918–1993), class of 1936, radio actress
- Gene Weltfish (1902–1980), class of 1919, anthropologist and historian

== See also ==
- List of New York City Designated Landmarks in Manhattan above 110th Street
- National Register of Historic Places listings in Manhattan above 110th Street
