= Lucia Dunham =

American operatic soprano (died 1959)

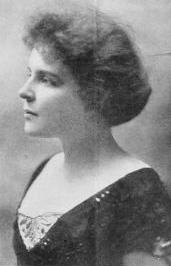
Lucia Dunham, 1914

Lucia Dunham (died April 3, 1959, Paramus, New Jersey) was an American voice teacher, classical soprano, and academic writer on singing and diction who is chiefly remembered as a longtime professor of vocal performance at the Juilliard School from 1922 until 1956.

== Life ==
Born in New York City, she studied voice at the National Conservatory of Music of America and then the Institute of Musical Art (now the Juilliard School) where she earned a diploma in 1909 and was a voice student of Adrian Freni, George Henschel, and Milka Ternina. She became a resident artist at the Paris Opera where she continued training with Alfred Giraudet. She pursued further studies with Lilli Lehmann in Salzburg and at the University of California, Berkeley where she also taught as a member of the voice faculty prior to her post at Juilliard. At Berkeley she collaborated closely with musicologist Charles Seeger, and gave recitals of folk songs that were collected and/or arranged by him. She left California after the death of her husband in 1921 to live close to her remaining family in New York City. She also taught voice part time at Columbia University in addition to teaching full time at the Juilliard School.

As a performer Dunham was mainly active in recitals and concerts in the United States and Europe, but did appear in operas in France, Austria, and California. She was particularly active as a soloist with the San Francisco Symphony and the New York Symphony Orchestra under Walter Damrosch. In her earlier career when she was more active she performed as a soprano, but in later years she performed as a mezzo-soprano. A founding member of the National Association of Teachers of Singing, many of her pupils had successful performance careers both in the United States and abroad, including Charles Bressler, Anne Brown, Ruby Elzy, Nanette Fabray, Elia Kazan, Rosemary Kuhlmann, Carmen Velma Shepperd, and Graciela Rivera among others. She wrote several published monographs on the art of singing and on diction for singers. She died in hospital in Paramus, New Jersey on April 3, 1959.
