= Juliet Clannon Cushing =

American educator and labor activist (1845–1934)

- Born: Juliet Clannon; September 17, 1845; New York City
- Died: September 6, 1934 (aged 88); Short Hills, New Jersey
- Occupations: Educator, labor activist

Juliet Clannon Cushing (September 17, 1845 – September 6, 1934) was an American educator and labor activist, interested in protecting women workers and limiting child labor. She was a founder of the Consumers League of New Jersey in 1900, and president of the organization for thirty years.

== Early life ==
Juliet Clannon was born in New York City, the daughter of Simon Clannon and Sarah M. Olmstead Clannon. Her father was born in Ireland; he was active in New York politics, and died when Juliet was a girl. She was educated at Miss Wadleigh's school in New York.

== Career ==
Juliet Clannon taught school in New York before marriage, and was appointed vice principal of Grammar School No. 47 in 1875; she resigned that position several months later, upon her marriage. Cushing was president of the Women's Club of Orange, New Jersey, from 1896 to 1898, and attended national meetings of the General Federation of Women's Clubs in Denver, Louisville, and New York City. She and settlement house worker Cornelia Foster Bradford founded the Consumers League of New Jersey in 1900, and Cushing served as president of the organization for its first thirty years. She was also vice president of the National Consumers League. She chaired the New Jersey Child Labor and Welfare Committee. In 1914, she was a founder of the non-profit People's Legislative Bureau of New Jersey.

During World War I she was active in monitoring the working conditions for women in war-related industries. In 1928, she was awarded an honorary degree from the New Jersey College for Women, "in recognition for Mrs. Cushing's child welfare work."

Cushing was prominent in Presbyterian Church work, as president of the Missionary Society of the Munn Avenue Presbyterian Church of East Orange, and honorary president of the Presbyterian Society of Morris and Orange. She also worked with the city's Federation of Women's Church Organizations.

== Personal life ==
Juliet Clannon married railroad official George Wade Brooks Cushing (1818–1888) in 1875; she was his second wife. He had five grown children from an earlier marriage, and they had five children together: Helen (born 1876), Laura (born 1878), Edna (born 1881), Prentice (born 1883), and Eliot (born 1886). She was widowed when George died in 1888. Juliet Clannon Cushing died in 1934, aged 88 years, at her daughter's home in Short Hills, New Jersey. Her gravesite is in Green-Wood Cemetery in Brooklyn, New York.
