= Lucille Dixon Robertson =

American jazz double-bassist (1923–2004)

Lucille Dixon Robertson (27 February 1923 – 23 September 2004) was a jazz double-bassist. She grew up in New York City and she successfully auditioned for the All City High School Orchestra. She studied under Frederick Zimmermann of the New York Philharmonic for 15 years.

Lucille Dixon was born on February 23, 1923, in Harlem. She studied music with Carmen Velma Shepperd as a girl. During high school she performed in the All-City High School Orchestra. Beginning in 1941, she was a member of the National Youth Administration orchestra. After studying for a year at Brooklyn College, she performed with the all-female International Sweethearts of Rhythm. She then joined the band of jazz pianist Earl Hines in 1943. She continued with Hines' band until 1945, then formed the Lucille Dixon Orchestra, which existed from 1946 to 1960. Through its history, her band included many famous performers, including Buddy Tate, Sonny Payne, Tyree Glenn, George Matthews, and Bill Smith.
