= Whittier House (Jersey City, New Jersey) =

- Formation: 1894
- Founder: Cornelia Foster Bradford
- Purpose: Social reform
- Coordinates: 40°42′57″N 74°02′30″W

Whittier House was an American social settlement, situated in the midst of the densely populated Paulus Hook district of Jersey City, New Jersey. Christian, but non-denominational, its aims were to help all in need by improving their circumstances, by inspiring them with new motives and higher ideals, and by making them better fitted by the responsibilities and privileges of life. It cooperated with all who were seeking to ameliorate the human condition and improve the social order. It opened in the People's Palace, December 20, 1893. On May 14, 1894, it incorporated and moved to 174 Grand Street.

Founded by Cornelia Foster Bradford and named after John Greenleaf Whittier, Whittier House was the first and only "classic" settlement in New Jersey as it was modeled closely after Hull House. In 1924, Whittier House became affiliated with the Boys' Club of America and later was later taken over by them during the Great Depression with assistance from the Works Progress Administration. From 1940 to 1981, it was the Whittier House Division of the Jersey City Boys' Club. Its archives, a collection of records spanning the period of 1894 to 1974, are held by the New Jersey Historical Society. The Boys & Girls Clubs of Hudson County continues the work and mission started at Whittier House and is still located in Paulus Hook.

== History ==
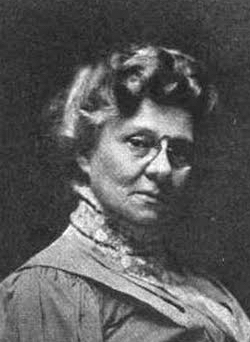
Cornelia Foster Bradford (1914 publication)

Whittier House was established May 14, 1894, by Cornelia Foster Bradford as the outgrowth of social work begun December 20, 1893, in a small room called an “office" in the People's Palace. It incorporated for the following purposes:

1. Through friendship, neighborliness and personal influence to promote in the community such a relation of fellowship and mutual helpfulness between people of different occupations and different opportunities as shall improve the physical, intellectual and moral welfare of the neighborhood. The means to this end shall include, in addition to the personal forces of friendship, the formation of such kindergartens, classes, clubs and societies as shall promote the social ideal.
2. To establish a house which shall serve as the residence for those actively engaged in the work of the settlement, as the center for advantageously studying the social problem at close range and out of personal experience; as the meeting place for clubs, classes, conferences and entertainments, and as the common meeting ground for the development and expression of the social, civic and moral spirit of the community.
3. To co-operate with churches, with educational, charitable and labor organizations, and with other agencies organized for the improvement of social conditions.

== Neighborhood ==
According to reports at the time, the neighborhood was 75% Slavic and 25% Irish, German, African American, Russian, Polish, and Italian. The men worked in the sugar, soap, and tobacco factories, and on the docks. The quarter was sordidly poor and in constant flux, with none of the picturesque and intellectual qualities of the lower East Side of New York City.

== Activities ==
Whittier House was the pioneer settlement in New Jersey. It was able to be of service as well to the state as to the city. With the College Settlements Association, it conducted an investigation into the housing conditions of Jersey City, which resulted in the formation of the State Tenement House Commission. The first inspectors, working under the commission, were residents. The house was instrumental in establishing the State Consumers' League, which had its office at the House, the State Neighborhood Workers Association, and the Hudson County Tuberculosis Sanitarium. Residents frequently appeared before various legislative committees, and were represented on the State Board of Charities, the Child Labor Committee, the Pure Food Committee, the Children's Protective Alliance, the Hudson County Vigilance League.

The distinctive work of this settlement was cooperation with State and municipal authorities. It had manual training, a kindergarten, classes in art, cooking, dressmaking, millinery, a boys' association, and social, education and musical departments. The Organized Aid Society of Jersey City, the Jersey State Legal Society, and the State Consumers' League all held their meetings here, and some of the residents were represented on every one of these boards. Whatever was going on in the city to uplift humanity, whether it be carried on by the Salvation Army, by the Street Cleaning Department, or by any other one of the municipal departments, Whittier House was called upon or represented in some way.

Whittier House established:

- the first free kindergarten in the city, later turning it over to the public authorities
- the first dental clinic
- the first fresh-air program for children, resulted in a summer camp at Pomona, New York
- the first diet kitchen
- the first visiting district nurse, which resulted in the organization of the Municipal Nursing Service
- the first public playground, which was for some years, the only one

In 1896 the mayor appointed two residents on the Investigation and Relief Committee for the purpose of inquiry into the origin of a large fire, and to administer funds to the victims. It discontinued its dispensary to co-operate in 1907 with the city dispensaries; and relinquished its library to the city, though it was continued in the building. Its legal aid department, organized in 1894, was always an important feature. It was instrumental in organizing the Jersey City Society for Prevention of Cruelty to Children, the Organized Aid, and the City Betterment League. Its Neighborhood Council appeared before the mayor, the board of education, and other public bodies, and was instrumental in securing a playground for the ward, and in doing other social work.

== People ==
The settlement was named after the poet, John Greenleaf Whittier, and the motto of the house were the poet's words:— "He serves Thee best who loveth most. His brothers and Thy own."

The founder and head worker, Bradford, was assisted by seven additional resident, and 70 non-resident workers. Bradford gave much time to lecturing, writing, and speaking on phases of social work both in New Jersey and elsewhere.

Mary Philbrook, the first female attorney in New Jersey and the first to be admitted to the state bar association, volunteered to be the settlement's first Legal Aid Society advisor.

Mary Buell Sayles became a settlement resident and worked there for two years on a fellowship from the College Settlements Association. In 1902, Sayles studied the problems of over two-thousand tenement apartments in the working-class section of the First Ward (Paulus Hook), known as "Gammontown", in Jersey City. Her report The Housing Conditions of Jersey City (1902) received national acclaim and was published in the Annals of the American Academy of Political and Social Science (1903). In response to the report, mayor Mark M. Fagan (1902–1907 & 1913–1917) created the Municipal Sanitary League and opened city's first public bath house on Coles Street in 1904. Additionally, Jersey City native, Governor Franklin Murphy, formed the first State Tenement House Commission for statewide reform and the New Jersey Legislature passed the "Tenement House Act" in 1904.

A Board of Directors was made up of men and women representing various parts of New Jersey. The governing board was made up of members of the older clubs, and all questions of detail in regard to the carrying on of the settlement were referred to this board.

The Auxiliary was made up of women who lived in Jersey City.

The work and accomplishments at Whittier House attracted visitors such as Jane Addams of Hull House and James Ramsey MacDonald, the first Labour Party Prime Minister of the United Kingdom.

== See also ==
- Settlement and community houses in the United States
