= Geffen (surname) =

Geffen (Hebrew: גֶּפֶן, lit. Grapevine) is a Hebrew surname. Notable people with the surname include:

- Aviv Geffen (born 1973), Israeli rock singer
- David Geffen (born 1943), American record executive, film producer and theatrical producer
- Jeremy Geffen (1977–2018), American entrepreneur and entertainment executive
- Maxwell M. Geffen (1896–1980), American editor and publisher from New York
- Shira Geffen (born 1971), Israeli actress, screenwriter and film director
- Tobias Geffen (1870–1970), American rabbi from Atlanta, Georgia
- Yehonatan Geffen (1947–2023), Israeli writer
- Yetta Dorothea Geffen (1891–1986), American musician, journalist, and theatre professional
