= Aurora Greely =

American dancer and choreographer

Aurora Borealis Greely (1905 – 1983) was an African American dancer and choreographer from the 1920s through the 1940s.

== Biography ==
Greely was born in Jacksonville, Florida in 1905. In 1922 she was a student at Wadleigh High School for Girls and was performing in Irvin C. Miller's play "Liza" which was on Broadway. She started in the chorus, and then moved into leading roles. In 1929 she opened a dancing school in Los Angeles, and in 1932, she took a break from dancing because she suffered from "rheumatic leg". Greely returned to dancing an in 1935 she was described as a "popular dance team" when she danced with Leroy Broomfield. In 1933, she and Broomfield danced before King Gustaf V of Sweden while in Shanghai.

At the Cotton Club in Culver City, California, Greely selected the dancers from her dancing school for the shows, and was herself dancing in shows.
