= Charles Bressler =

American tenor

Charles Bressler (April 1, 1926 – November 28, 1996) was an American tenor and voice teacher. He is noted for his performances of early music and was especially active as an oratorio soloist. He sang less frequently in operas, but did make several appearances with the Santa Fe Opera in the 1960s. He taught on the music faculties of several institutions, among them the Mannes College of Music, the Manhattan School of Music, and the North Carolina School of the Arts.

== Life and career ==
Charles Bressler was born on April 1, 1926 in Kingston, Pennsylvania. After graduating from high school he served in the United States Navy. He studied singing at the Juilliard School with Lucia Dunham, Sergius Kagan, and Marjorie Schloss. He graduated from Juilliard in 1950, and then immediately returned to the US Navy to work in naval intelligence during the Korean War.

Bressler was a longtime member of New York Pro Musica (NYPM, originally called Pro Musica Antiqua), an early music ensemble organized by conductor Noah Greenberg in 1952. Bressler joined this group after leaving the Navy, and sang his first professional concert with NYPM in April 1953. With NYPM he toured widely on a periodic basis in both the United States and Canada from 1953 to 1963. He toured to Europe with NYOM in 1960 in a production of the 13th century liturgical drama Play of Daniel. This included performances at the Théâtre des Nations Festival in Paris where he won the Best Male Singer prize.

While a member of the NYPM, Bressler was engaged with other performance work. In 1955 he was a singer in the Broadway production of Jean Anouilh's The Lark at the Longacre Theatre. In 1957 he co-founded the New York Chamber Soloists, and returned to Broadway as a singer in Sol Stein's A Shadow of My Enemy at the ANTA Theatre. In 1961 he sang the roles of Zadok, the High Priest and the Attendant in Handel's Solomon with the Los Angeles Philharmonic at the Hollywood Bowl. In 1962 he was a soloist in Johann Sebastian Bach's St Matthew Passion with the New York Philharmonic, soprano Adele Addison, mezzo Betty Allen, tenor David Lloyd, and bass William Wilderman.

In 1966 Bressler made his first appearance with the Santa Fe Opera (SFO) as Don Ramiro in Gioachino Rossini's La Cenerentola with Helen Vanni as Cinderella and Julian Patrick as Dandini. This was followed by further performances in Santa Fe that year as Don Ottavio in Don Giovanni with Richard Cross in the title role, Donald Gramm as Leperello, and Beverly Bower as Donna Anna. Other parts he sang with the SFO included the Captain in Alban Berg's Wozzeck (1966), Lilaque pere in the United States premiere of Boulevard Solitude (1967), Count Almaviva in Rossini's The Barber of Seville (1967), a Rebellious Soul in Arnold Schoenberg's Die Jakobsleiter (1968), and Tiresias in the United States premiere of Hans Werner Henze's The Bassarids (1968). He later returned to SFO in 1972 to give a recital with the pianist Donald Hassard at the Lensic Theater.

Bressler joined the voice faculty at the Mannes College of Music in 1966. He taught there until 1977 when he joined the faculty of the Manhattan School of Music. He also taught at the North Carolina School of the Arts and Brooklyn College during his career. He continued to perform, mainly as an oratorio soloist and recitalist, while teaching. In 1969 he performed the title role in Hector Berlioz's La Damnation de Faust with the Oakland Symphony.

In 1972 he performed Bach's Ich armer Mensch, ich Sündenknecht, BWV 55 with the Los Angeles Chamber Orchestra. In 1978 he was a soloist in Mozart's Requiem with conductor Calvin Simmons at the Midsummer Mozart Festival in San Francisco held at the Herbst Theatre, and was a soloist in both Hans Werner Henze's King David and Zoltán Kodály's Psalmus Hungaricus with the Sacramento Symphony.

He also made a number of important recordings with Maurice Abravanel and the Utah Symphony, notably the Vanguard recording of the Berlioz Requiem. In addition, he appeared on the Los Angeles Philharmonic recording of Respighi's Lauda per la Natività del Signore along with Marilyn Horne, Marie Gibson, and the Roger Wagner Chorale, conducted by Alfred Wallenstein. He died in New York City, aged 70.
