= USS Wadleigh =

Fletcher-class destroyer

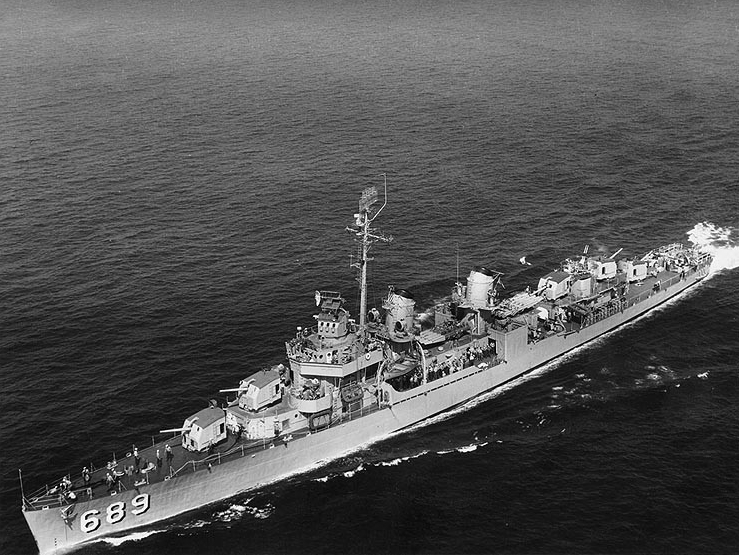
- USS Wadleigh (DD-689) Underway, c. 1951.

History

United States
- Name: USS Wadleigh (DD-689)
- Namesake: George H. Wadleigh
- Builder: Bath Iron Works
- Laid down: 5 April 1943
- Launched: 7 August 1943
- Commissioned: 19 October 1943
- Decommissioned: 28 June 1962
- Stricken: 1 September 1975
- Fate: Transferred to Chile, 26 July 1962

History

Chile
- Name: Blanco Encalada
- Acquired: 26 July 1962
- Decommissioned: 1982
- Stricken: 1982
- Fate: Sunk as target 28 September 1991

General characteristics
- Class & type: Fletcher-class destroyer
- Displacement: 2,050 tons
- Length: 376.4 ft (114.7 m)
- Beam: 39.6 ft (12.1 m)
- Draft: 13.8 ft (4.2 m)
- Propulsion: 60,000 shp (45 MW); 2 propellers
- Speed: 38 knots (70 km/h; 44 mph)
- Range: 6500 nmi. (12,000 km); at 15 kt
- Complement: 329
- Armament: 5 × 5 in (130 mm) guns; 10 × 40 mm AA guns; 7 × 20 mm AA guns; 10 × 21 in (63 cm) torpedo tubes

USS Wadleigh (DD-689) was a Fletcher-class destroyer of the United States Navy, named for Rear Admiral George H. Wadleigh (1842–1927).

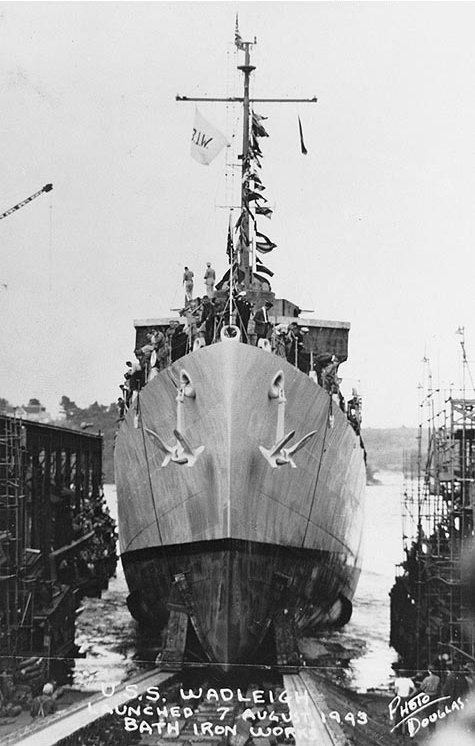
The launch of the USS Wadleigh

Wadleigh was laid down on 5 April 1943 at Bath, Maine, by the Bath Iron Works; launched on 7 August 1943; sponsored by Miss Clara F. Wadleigh, daughter of RAdm. Wadleigh; and commissioned at the Boston Navy Yard on 19 October 1943.

== World War II ==
Following shakedown training in the West Indies, Wadleigh rendezvoused in the mid-Atlantic with Iowa, Halsey Powell, and Marshall. The three destroyers escorted the battleship as she carried president Franklin D. Roosevelt back to the United States from talks with other Allied leaders at the Cairo Conference.

=== 1944 ===
Soon after her return from this special escort duty, Wadleigh got underway from Hampton Roads, Virginia, on 3 January 1944 and steamed via Panama to Pearl Harbor.

Her baptism of fire came on 20 March 1944 during the Marshall Islands campaign. Assigned shore-bombardment duties, Wadleigh—in company with McCalla and Sage —supported LCIs and LSTs during the landings on Ailinglapalap and expended 478 rounds of 5 inch shells which destroyed an enemy-held village. Three days later, the new destroyer again took part in shooting up Japanese defenses, shelling a weather station and a radio station on Ebon Island, helping to clear the way for the 1,500 marines who soon took the island.

The ship returned to the Hawaiian Islands for further operational training in preparation for the upcoming conquest of the Marianas. Assigned to Task Group 52.4 (TG 52.4), Wadleigh arrived off Roi Island in the Marshalls on 10 June, five days before D-Day for the invasion of Saipan Island. The day before the first landings, the warship closed Saipan and commenced fire early in the morning, beginning her part in the operations designed to "soften up" the enemy defenses.

On D-Day, Wadleigh lay offshore, providing predawn gunfire support for underwater demolition teams (UDTs) and for the initial waves of troops. After spending the day in shelling enemy positions, she retired seaward to conduct screening patrols. While thus engaged, Wadleigh and Melvin both picked up strong sonar contacts with a submarine west of Tinian. Both ships went to general quarters and attacked, dropping depth charges with deadly precision. A heavy explosion, followed by a widening slick of oil and debris, indicated that whatever had been down there had been heavily hit. Postwar accounting revealed that the two destroyers had teamed to sink the Japanese submarine Ro-114.

Assigned to bombard Garapan, the capital city of Saipan, Wadleigh encountered heavy activity of all types in this area, from both friend and foe alike, while expending some 1,700 rounds of 5 inch shells against the Japanese-held island. Not only was Wadleigh fired on by a Japanese shore battery, but the doughty destroyer was also straddled by a stick of bombs from a Japanese plane, mistaken for a low-flying aircraft by American forces, and again taken under fire from shore—all within a hair-raising space of 15 minutes! During the latter days of the campaign Wadleigh shot enemy snipers out of caves, trees, and cliffs; picked up an occasional Japanese prisoner, and rescued downed American aircrews shot down near her position.

Following escort runs to Eniwetok and Guadalcanal, Wadleigh was assigned to support the invasion of the Palaus. On 15 September, she patrolled north of the islands on radar picket duty, standing ready to provide early warning if Japanese planes were sighted.

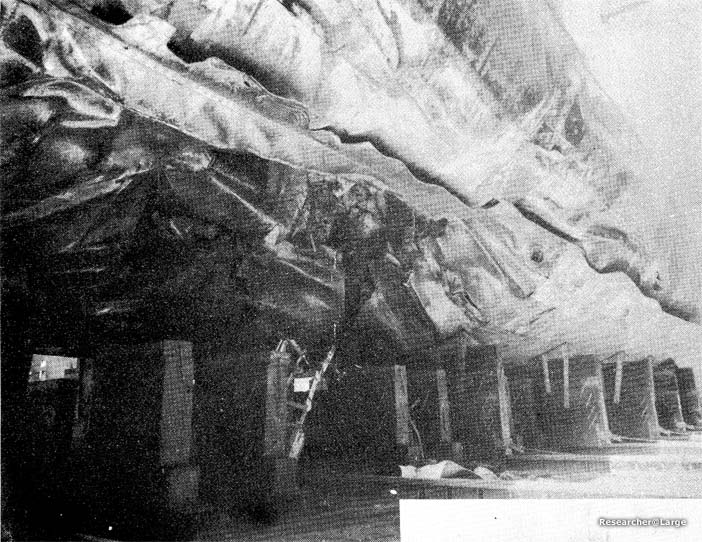
USS Wadleigh hull damage as a result of mine strike on 16 September 1944 off the Palau Islands

On the following day, Wadleigh steamed to Kossol Roads to begin assisting minesweepers in clearing the sealanes there. Floating mines swept up by the minesweepers provided the destroyers with "game", and Wadleigh destroyed 22 with 40-millimeter fire. The 23d, however, was deadly. While approaching one mine, the destroyer brushed horns with another, an unswept mine which burst amidships. The explosion ripped into the bowels of the ship, killing three men and injuring 20, while flooding three engineering compartments and one living space. As the crew raced to general quarters, the ship settled five feet by the stern, and listed seven degrees to starboard. Wadleigh, now sporting a 40-foot rend in her bottom, came to an even keel as the crew manhandled all movable weight from starboard to port to correct the list.

Bennett passed a towline and towed the stricken destroyer out of danger. The crippled ship, now sagging noticeably amidships, "worked" noticeably in the swells, prompting initial fears that the ship was breaking in two. In addition, the shock of the blast snapped one radar antenna and jarred both 26-foot motor whaleboats from their blocks.

=== 1945 ===
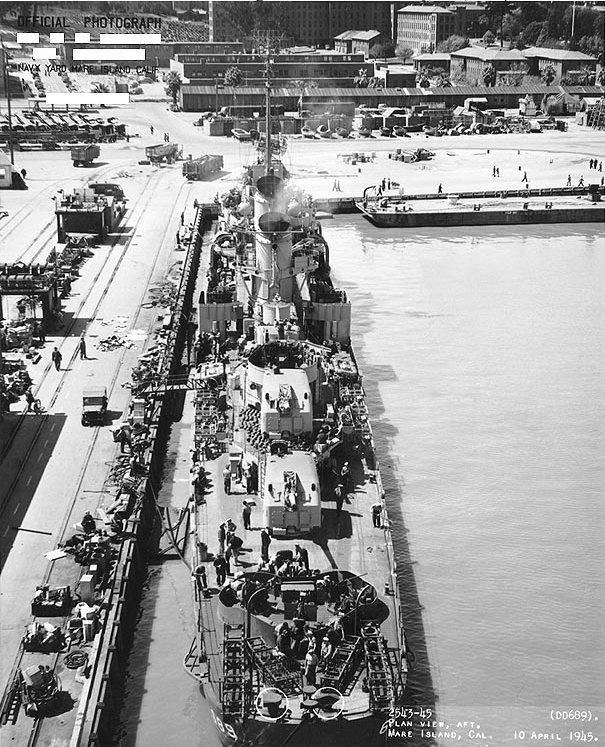
Wadleigh at Mare Island Naval Shipyard on 10 April 1945

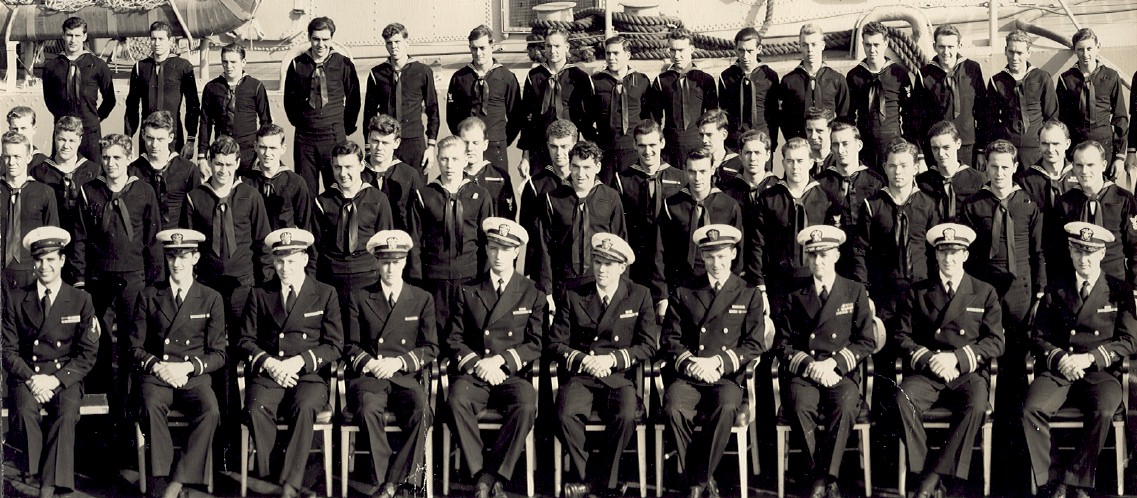
USS Wadleigh crew photograph circa 1945

After temporary repairs, the ship painfully made her way back to Pear

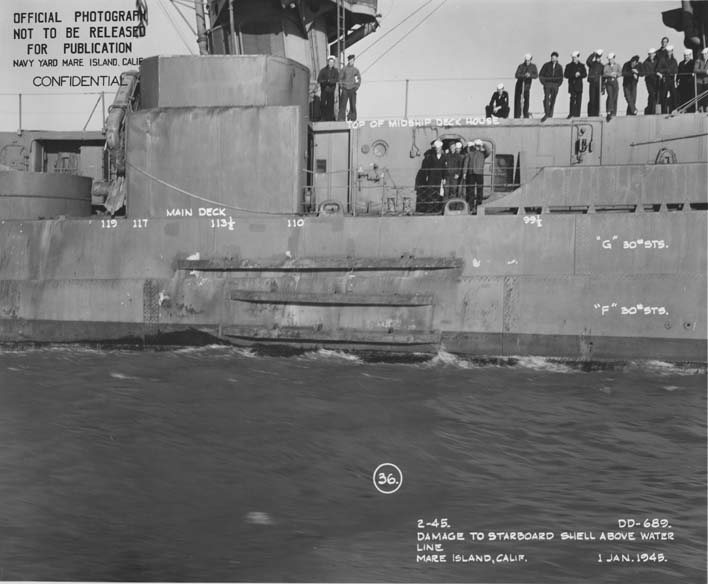
Temporary repairs to the Wadleigh's hull after striking a mine off Palau Island in 1944.

l Harbor and thence proceeded to the west coast to enter the Mare Island Navy Yard for repairs. Nearly rebuilt from the keel up, Wadleigh emerged from Mare Island on 20 February 1945 for speed trials and gunnery shoots. She departed San Diego, California, on 19 April and arrived at Pearl Harbor on 25 April, in company with Charrette, to conduct type-training exercises in the Hawaiian Islands.

She departed Pearl Harbor on 3 May, bound for Ulithi, and arrived there after an 11-day passage. Rejoining her old unit—Destroyer Squadron 54 (DesRon 54)—the destroyer sortied with other 5th Fleet units on 25 May. After serving several tours on radar picket stations with the Fleet, Wadleigh weathered heavy typhoons from 5 to 7 June and subsequently accompanied Alaska and Guam in a shore bombardment mission to Minami Daito Shima (Rasa Island) on the 9th, demolishing radar installations and buildings.

After a rest period in the Philippines, Wadleigh sailed again for Japanese waters to screen the aircraft carriers as they continued to pound the Japanese home islands. On 10 July, the ship embarked a party of dignitaries—including Assistant Secretary of the Navy for Air, John L. Sullivan, and Vice Admiral Aubrey W. Fitch, for transportation to Iwo Jima.

Rendezvousing with Ticonderoga at Guam, she rejoined her task force on 21 July to support offensive operations off Japan's doorstep. While serving on occasion 50 miles from the enemy shore, Wadleigh rescued two downed Navy aircrewmen who had been shot down during a strike on Tokyo.

The destroyer slowed to destroy a derelict mine on 10 August, but excessive turbine vibrations forced the ship to shut down her starboard engine. Detached from the task force, Wadleigh limped back to Ulithi, in a convoy of replenishment ships and tankers, for repairs. While en route, she received word of the Japanese capitulation.

Departing Ulithi on 23 August and hoping to rejoin the Fleet in time for the triumphal entry into Tokyo Bay, Wadleigh stopped at Iwo Jima en route for passengers and mail and arrived 24 hours after the first ships had entered the bay. Ordered to proceed directly to Sagami Wan, Wadleigh went to general quarters in company with Benevolence as the ships passed beneath the once-menacing shore batteries along the Urage Strait. They soon arrived at their destination, the Yokosuka Naval Base, on 29 August.

As the first American troops went ashore at Yokohama and Yokosuka, Wadleigh headed out to sea and rendezvoused with incoming carrier groups. She returned to her anchorage, near Missouri, on 2 September—in time to be on hand when the official surrender accords were signed that day.

Back at sea with the carriers once more, Wadleigh patrolled off the Japanese coast for two weeks, before she departed Nipponese waters on 16 September and proceeded via Eniwetok to Saipan in company with Bennington and Lexington for air group replacements. The destroyer returned to Tokyo Bay after a week at Saipan and arrived on 13 October, escorting Belleau Wood and Lexington.

Departing Japanese waters on 20 October, bound for the Hawaiian Islands, Wadleigh carried a load of men eligible for discharge upon their return to the United States. After a 48-hour layover in the Hawaiian Islands, she pressed on for San Francisco, arriving on 5 November 1945. She commenced a preinactivation overhaul on 5 December and sailed for San Diego, California, on 27 January 1946, for inactivation. The destroyer was placed out of commission, in reserve, in the San Diego group of the Pacific Reserve Fleet, in January 1947.

== 1951 – 1962 ==
Wadleigh remained in reserve until she was reactivated during the Korean War. On 3 October 1951, Wadleigh was recommissioned at San Diego.

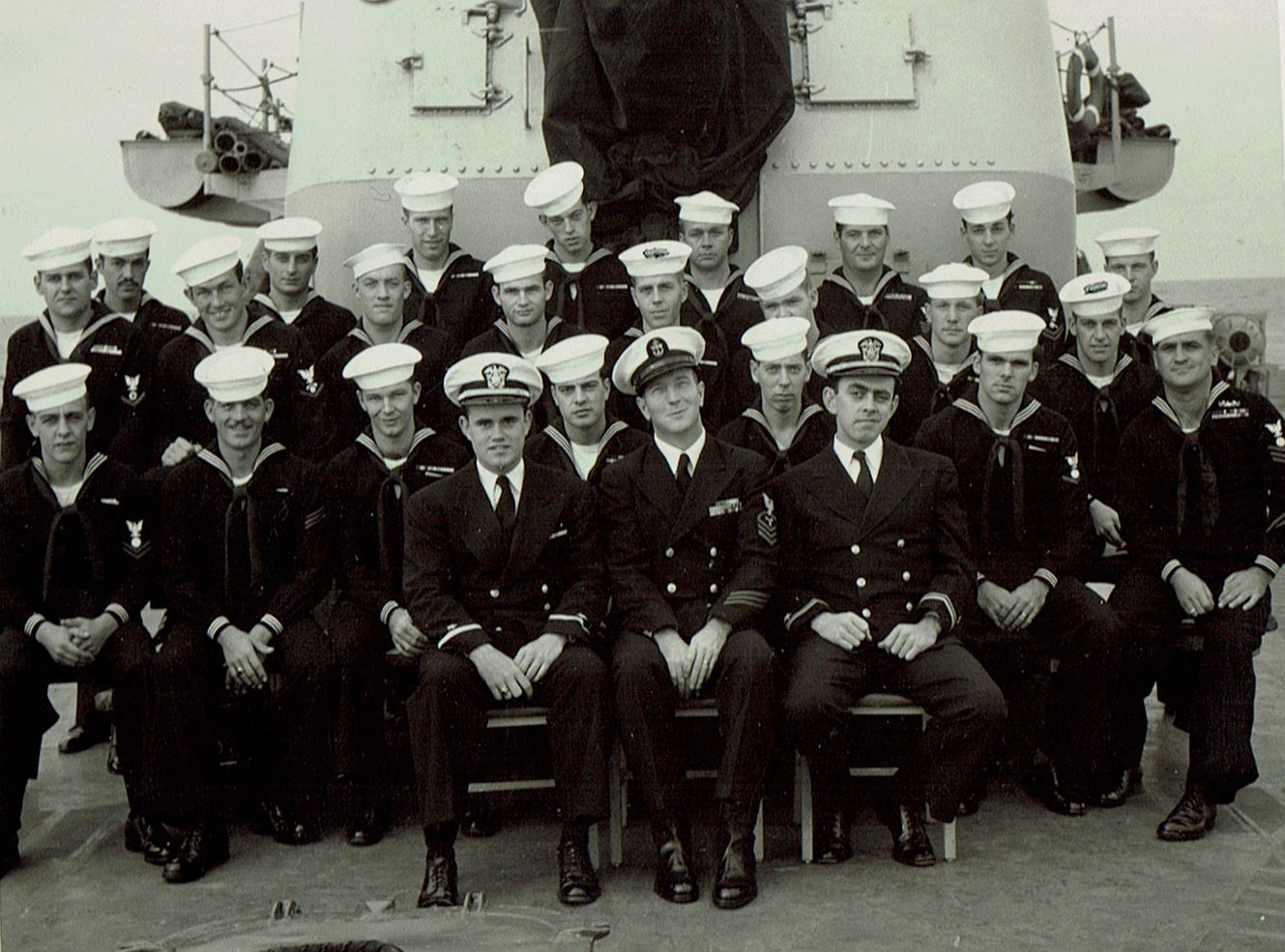
USS Wadleigh's engine compartment crew photographed in 1952.

She departed San Diego on 4 January 1952, bound for duty with the Atlantic Fleet. She transited the Panama Canal on 14 January—in company with Hazelwood, Heermann, Cassin Young, and Cowell—and, upon arrival at her new home port of Newport, Rhode Island, became flagship for Destroyer Division 342.

After participating in various Fleet exercises, Wadleigh arrived at Pensacola, Florida, on 17 August, to commence four weeks of plane-guard duty for Cabot. She rescued three downed aviators from the Gulf of Mexico during this tour. Next, the destroyer sailed north for an overhaul at the Boston Naval Shipyard—during which time the ship received a battery of 3 inch guns—replacing the older 40-millimeter mounts.

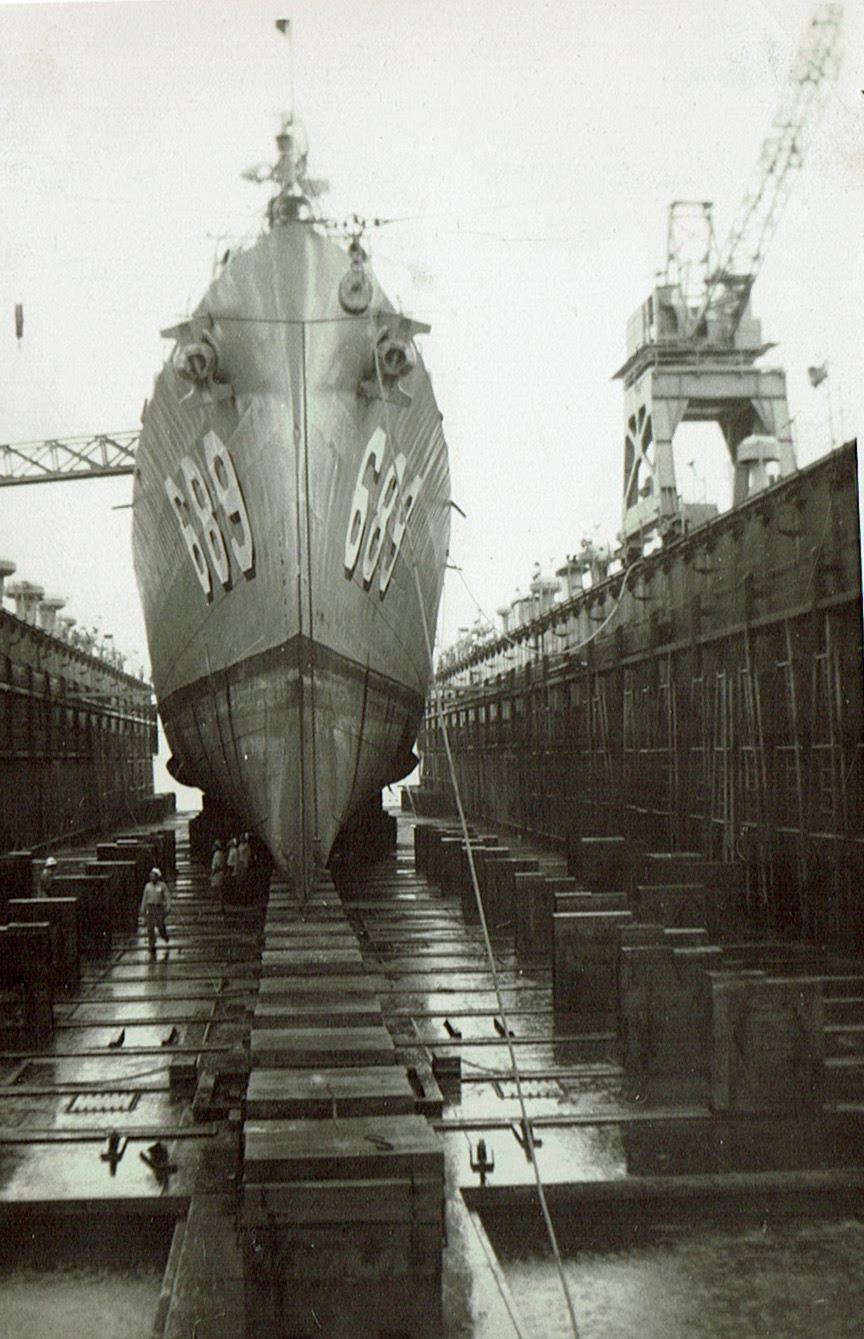
USS Wadeligh in dry dock at the Boston Naval Shipyard. The ships older 40 MM mounts were replaced with new 3 inch guns

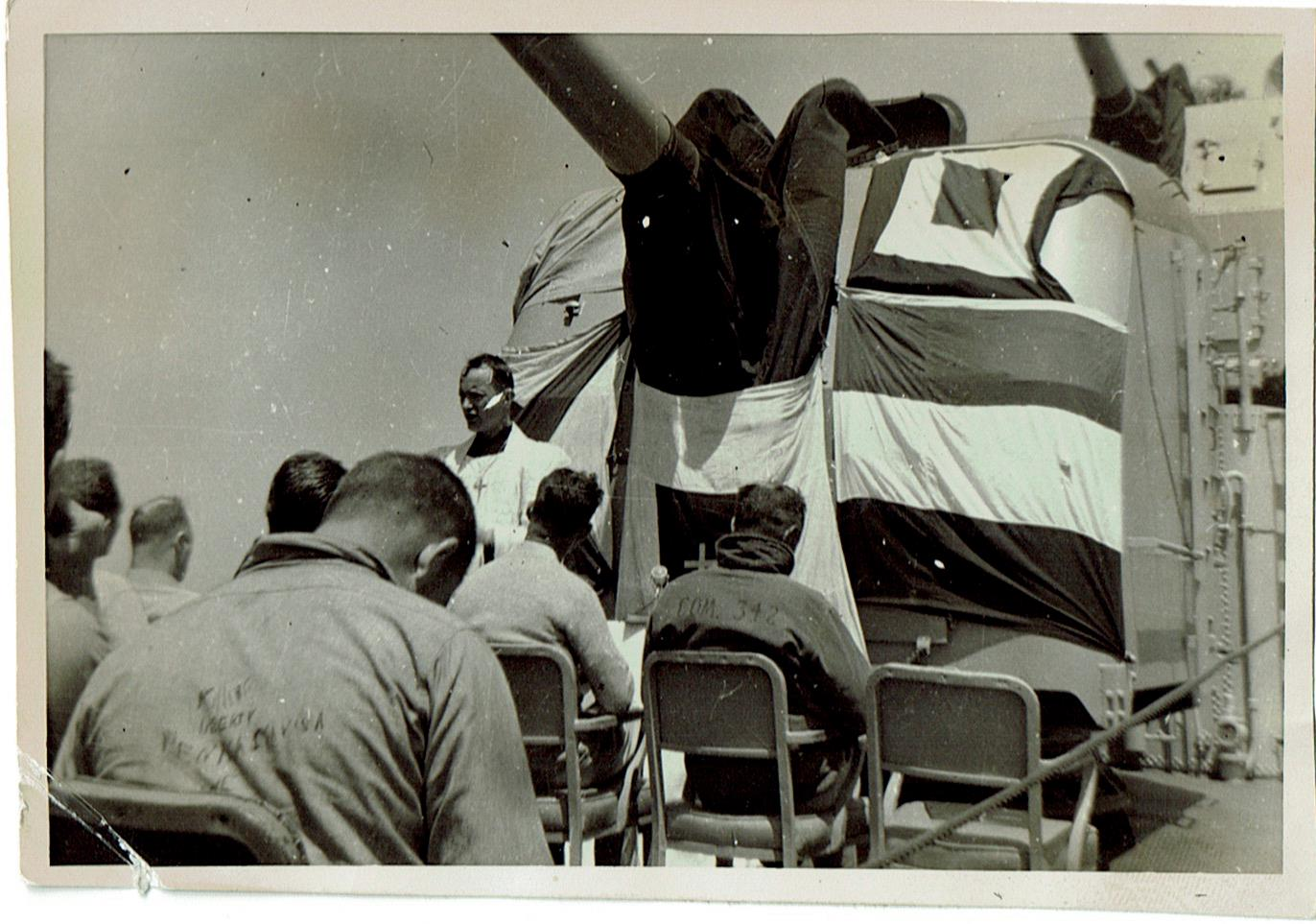
Sunday morning mass off the coast of Panama

On 3 May 1954, Wadleigh departed Newport, bound via the Panama Canal, Pearl Harbor, Midway, and Guam for the Western Pacific (WestPac), and arrived at Yokosuka, Japan, on 7 June 1954. After initially operating in the Philippine Islands, the destroyer shifted to the waters off the east coast of Korea, assisting in monitoring the Armistice Agreement reached at Panmunjom the year before.

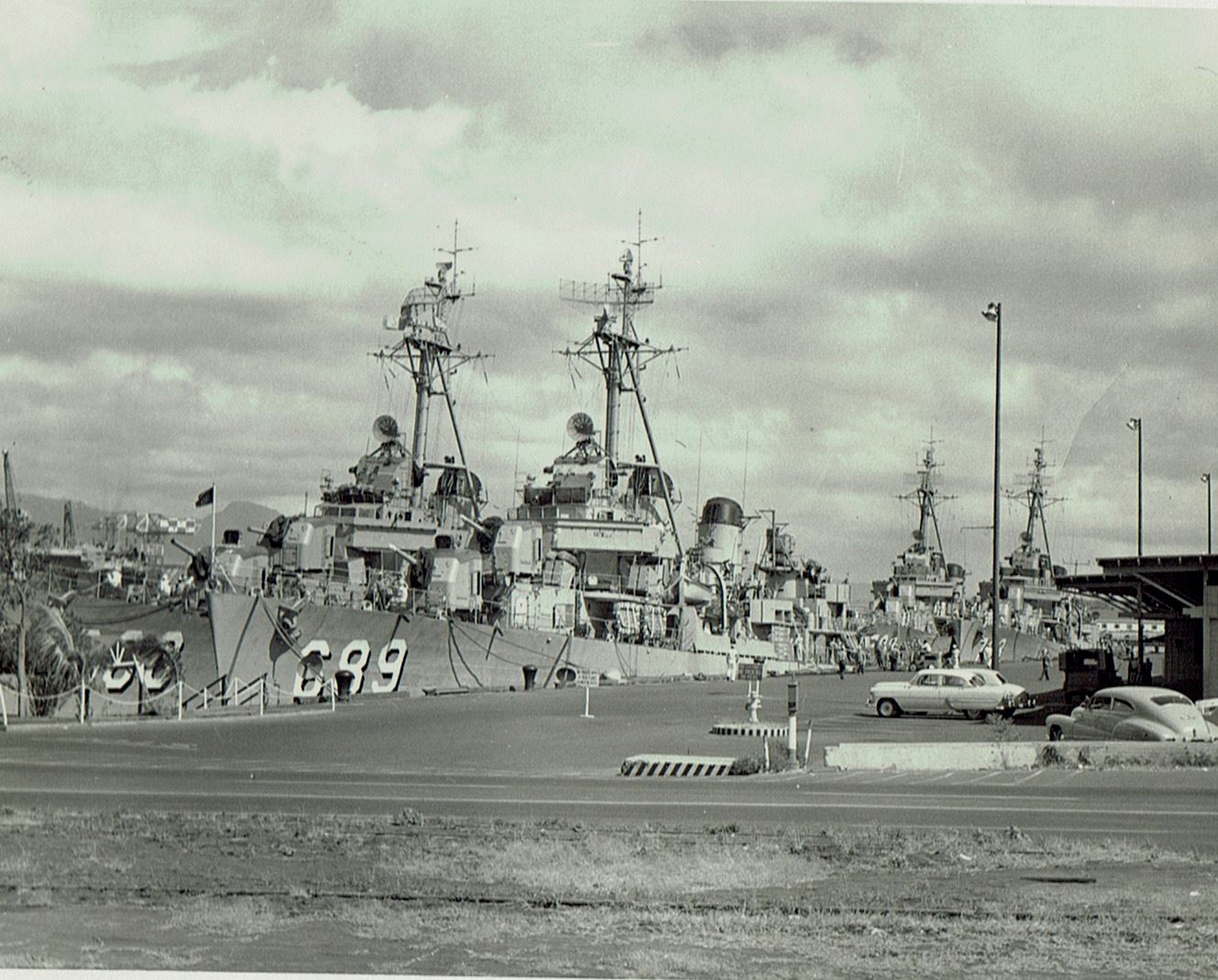
USS Wadleigh in its new home port at Newport, RI

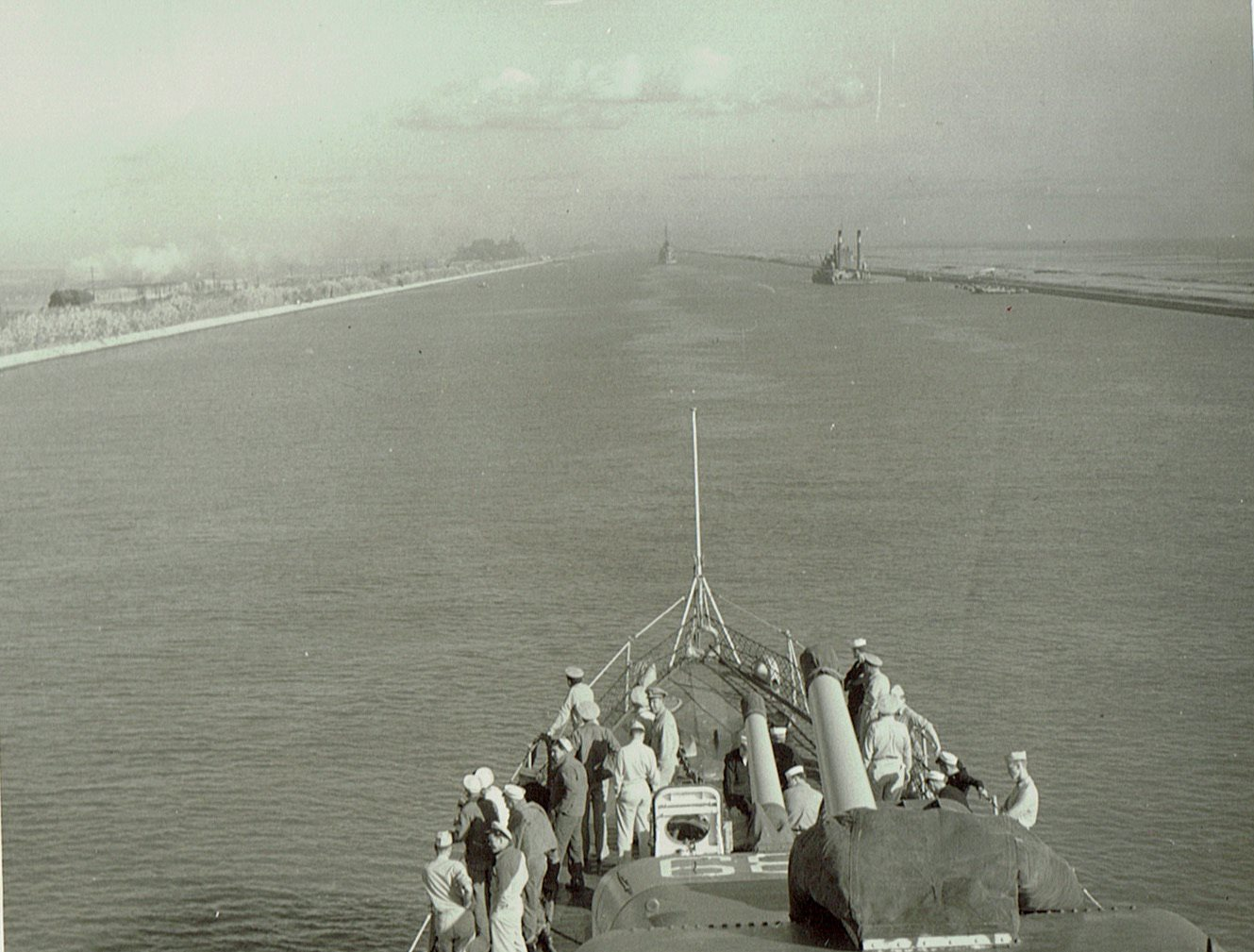
Wadleigh crossing the Suez Canal. Photograph by John Berwick

While in Subic Bay, Wadleigh was put on alert and ordered to rendezvous with Task Group 70.2 (TG 70.2). Once she joined with the group, TG 70.2 proceeded to the southern coast of Formosa in a precautionary move by the United States to forestall possible Chinese communist intentions towards the American-supported Nationalist Chinese regime on the island. While en route to Formosa, the ship struck an underwater object which inflicted minor damage to both screws. Returning to Subic Bay, the ship repaired the damage and sailed to rejoin the group. Once back on station, she spent 20 tense but uneventful days on patrol off Formosa and, soon thereafter, proceeded back to Sasebo, Japan, to prepare to return to the United States.

Wadleigh returned to Newport—via Hong Kong, Singapore, Colombo, and various Mediterranean ports— and arrived at her home port on 28 November 1954. Shifting to the Caribbean, she operated both in these waters and off the east coast, on antisubmarine warfare (ASW) exercises and local operations, through the end of 1955. She then deployed three times to the Mediterranean.

During the third of these deployments, in July 1958, tensions flared in Lebanon, and civil strife threatened American lives and property. Accordingly, the United States landed troops to restore order. Wadleigh was among the first American ships to arrive on the scene, with another much-decorated Fletcher-class destroyer, The Sullivans, arriving simultaneously. During the Lebanese crisis, she conducted eastern Mediterranean patrols as a unit of TF 61.

She returned to the east coast soon thereafter to operate along the Atlantic seaboard and into the Caribbean through the fall of 1958 before deploying to the Mediterranean for a fourth time in June 1959. While homeward-bound to Newport in September of that year, she served as one of the chain of ships beneath the aerial route of president Dwight D. Eisenhower's return to the United States after his summit conferences in Europe.

During the period in which the ship continued to be based out of Newport, she conducted ASW exercises and local operations through the end of the year and into 1960. On 19 March 1960, Wadleigh sped to the scene of a collision between Darby and a Swedish tanker off Cape Henry. Commander, Destroyer Squadron 20 (DesRon 20), embarked in Wadleigh, was on-scene commander and directed the successful effort to take Darby under tow.

Returning to a schedule of local operations, Wadleigh conducted a midshipman's training cruise, ASW patrols, and exercises. During a deployment to European waters in the fall of 1960, she conducted NATO fall exercises in the North Sea and across the Arctic Circle.

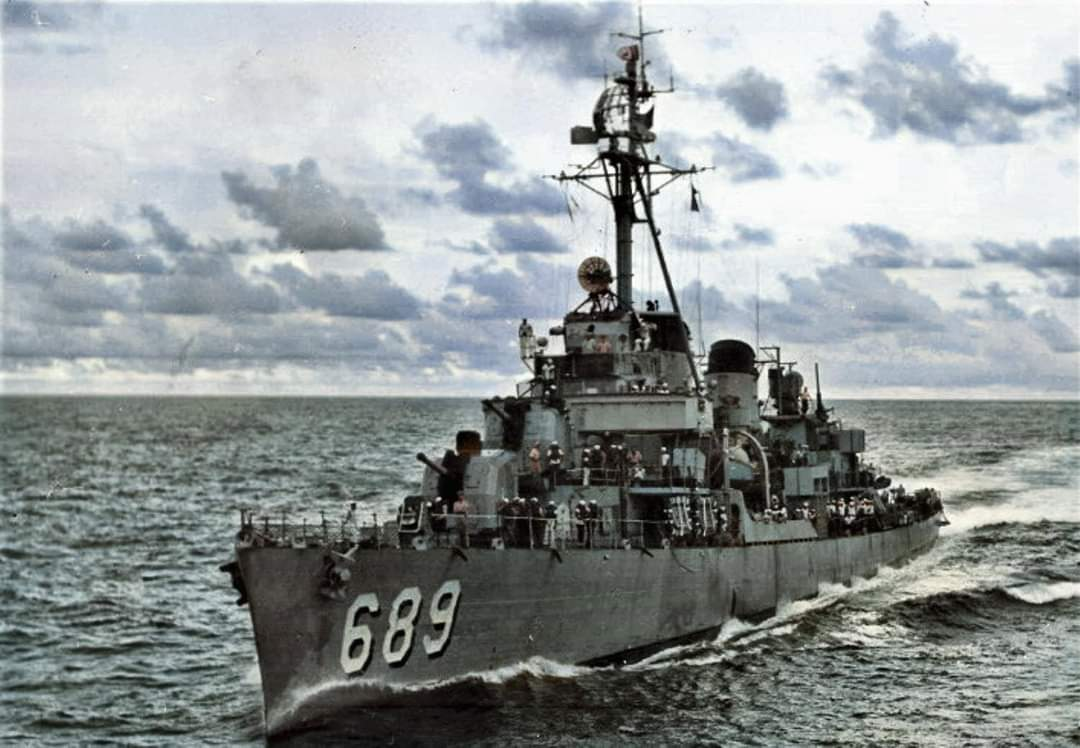
USS Wadleigh underway.

Deploying to the Mediterranean for the fifth time, Wadleigh transited the Suez Canal and participated in CENTO Exercise Midlink III, in which the naval forces of five nations participated. In November 1960, the ship returned to Mediterranean and western European waters, and took part in ASW Exercises "Hay-strike" and "Jetstream" with French Navy units before returning to Newport on 15 December 1960.

She then conducted ASW exercises out of Mayport, Florida, and practiced recovery techniques for participation in Project Mercury, the first American crewed spaceflight program. Attached to TG 140.8, Wadleigh was on station on 5 May 1961 when Comdr. Alan Shepard conducted his history-making flight. A second participation by Wadleigh in the Project Mercury program came in August of that year, but unfavorable weather "scrubbed" the launch, and the destroyer was detached to return to Newport.

Late in the following fall, Wadleigh sailed for European waters once more and participated in Exercise Line Jug II—extensive ASW exercises with Royal Navy units. She topped this deployment with visits to ports in the British Isles like Londonderry and Southampton before returning to her home port on 22 February 1962. She conducted routine local operations until departing Newport on 22 June for Norfolk, Virginia. There, the ship was decommissioned and placed in reserve on 28 June 1962.

=== Honors and awards ===
Wadleigh received six battle stars for her service in World War II.

== Chilean service ==
Wadleigh was transferred to Chile under the Military Aid Program in 1963. The ship was renamed Blanco Encalada and was given identification number 14.

Blanco Encalada was decommissioned and stricken in 1982, and on 28 September 1991 was sunk off southern Chile by a Harpoon missile launched from the Spruance-class destroyer USS O'Bannon during an Operation Unitas XXXII exercise.
