= Carmen Velma Shepperd =

American singer (1910–1997)

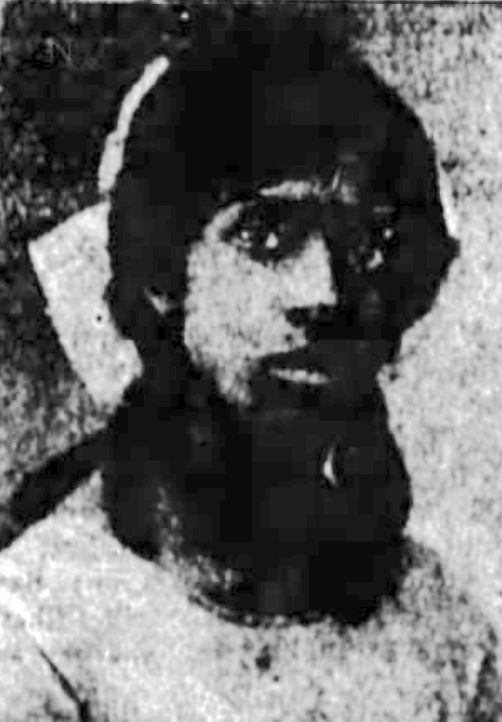
- Carmen Velma Shepperd as a teenager, from a 1925 newspaper
- Born: October 30, 1910; Kingston, Jamaica
- Died: December 6, 1997 (aged 87)
- Occupations: Singer, educator

Carmen Velma Shepperd (October 30, 1910 – December 6, 1997) was an American singer, pianist, and educator, born in Jamaica.

== Early life and education ==
Carmen Velma Shepperd was born in Kingston, Jamaica, the daughter of David N. Shepperd and Theresa Ann Rodriquez Shepperd. She moved to the United States with her parents, and grew up in New York City. Her mother was a dressmaker.

As a young singer, Shepperd earned medals from the New York Music Education League. She graduated from Wadleigh High School and earned two diplomas from the Juilliard School in 1934. At Juilliard she studied voice with Lucia Dunham. She earned a bachelor's degree and a master's degree from Columbia University. She pursued further studies in France, in the class of 1947 at the Fontainebleau School of Music.

== Career ==
Shepperd, a pianist and mezzo soprano singer, gave several recitals at New York's Town Hall, Carnegie Hall, and other venues. She sang works by Black composer Harry Burleigh as part of "The Three Nightingales", with her Juilliard classmates Ruby Elzy and Anne Brown. She sang on radio and in the trio as a young woman.

In 1930, Shepperd founded the Carmen Shepperd School of Music. Her students gave annual recitals at Town Hall and Aeolian Hall. Her school was awarded a service medal in 1931 by the New York Music Week Association, at a Carnegie Hall event, and continued into the 1950s and 1960s. Among her music students was bassist Lucille Dixon Robertson.

Shepperd was an active member of the New York chapters of the National Council of Negro Women, Delta Sigma Theta, the American Association of University Women, the National Association of Negro Musicians, the American Caribbean Scholarship Fund, and several alumni associations. In 1980, she accompanied Butterfly McQueen in a performance in Brooklyn.
