= George H. Wadleigh =

United States Navy Rear Admiral (1842–1927)

George Henry Wadleigh
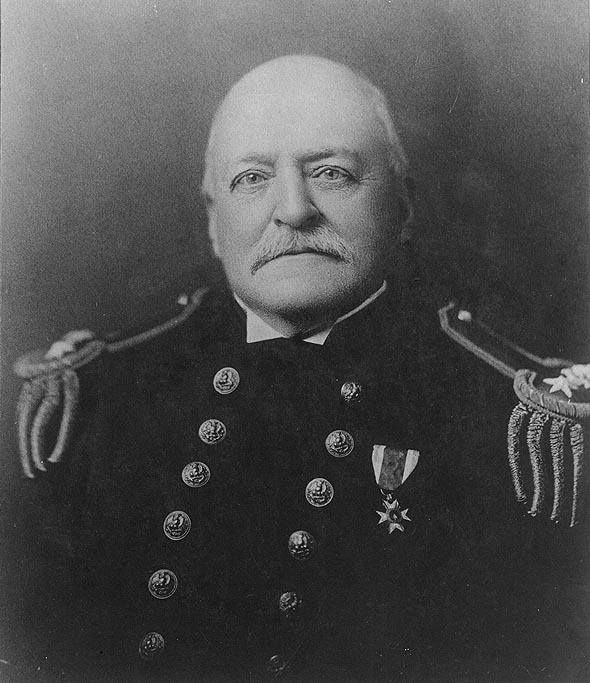
- Rear Admiral George H. Wadleigh, ca. 1902
- Born: September 28, 1842; Dover, New Hampshire
- Died: July 11, 1927 (aged 84); Dover, New Hampshire
- Military career
- Allegiance: United States of America
- Branch: United States Navy
- Service years: 1860–1902
- Rank: Rear admiral
- Commands: Alliance; Michigan; Richmond; Minneapolis; Philadelphia; Wabash
- Conflicts: American Civil War; Spanish–American War

Rear Admiral George Henry Wadleigh (September 28, 1842 – July 11, 1927) served in the United States Navy during the American Civil War and the Spanish–American War.

== Biography ==
Wadleigh was born in Dover, New Hampshire, and entered the United States Naval Academy on September 26, 1860, with the rank of midshipman. He graduated on May 28, 1863, with the rank of ensign. He then served during the Civil War in the Gulf of Mexico on the steam sloops Lackawanna and Richmond, seeing action at the battle of Mobile Bay, August 5, 1864, and receiving promotion to master on November 10, 1865.

After the Civil War he became a companion of the Massachusetts Commandery of the Military Order of the Loyal Legion of the United States.

In 1866–1869 Wadleigh was in European, Mediterranean and African waters as an officer of Ticonderoga, and received promotion to the rank of lieutenant on November 10, 1866, and to lieutenant commander on March 12, 1868.

During the following decade he had shore duty at the Naval Academy and several other facilities and was executive officer of the gunboat Shawmut, monitor Canonicus, schoolship St. Mary's and sloop Pensacola.

Promoted to commander on March 13, 1880, in 1881 he commanded Alliance during an arduous Arctic cruise searching for survivors of the ill-fated Jeannette expedition.

Commander Wadleigh spend most of the 1880s in shore positions. He returned to duty afloat in 1889–1891 as Commanding Officer of the Great Lakes gunboat Michigan. Promoted to captain on July 10, 1894, he commanded the receiving ship Richmond until late in that year, then took command of the new cruiser Minneapolis, in which he cruised in U.S., West Indian and European waters into 1897.

Captain Wadleigh served at the Boston Navy Yard until June 1898, including some very busy months near the end of that tour as the Navy prepared ships for Spanish–American War operations. From July 1898 until December 1901 he was Commanding Officer of the cruiser Philadelphia, in the Pacific, and the receiving ship Wabash at Boston.

He achieved the rank of rear admiral in February 1902 and was briefly Commandant of the Philadelphia Navy Yard and President of the Board of Inspection and Survey before retiring from active duty in June of that year. In retirement, Rear Admiral Wadleigh made his home at Dover, New Hampshire. He died on July 11, 1927.

== Namesake ==
The destroyer USS Wadleigh (DD-689) was named in honor of Rear Admiral Wadleigh.

== Gallery ==
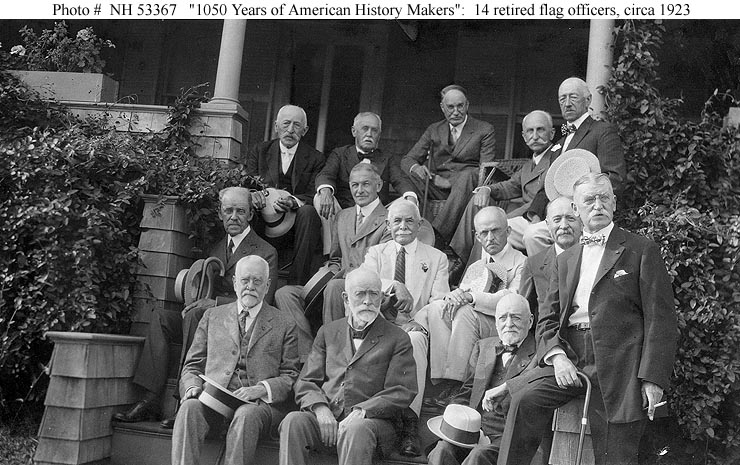
Wadleigh is third from left in the front row in this photograph of 13 retired U.S. Navy and U.S. Marine Corps flag officers taken ca. 1923.

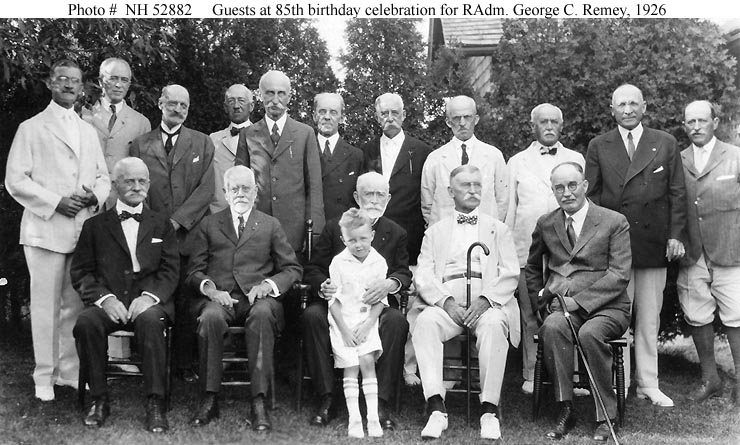
Wadleigh is seated in the center in this photo of retired flag officers taken at the 85th birthday party of Rear Admiral George C. Remey on 10 August 1926.
