= Lydia Fowler Wadleigh =

American educator

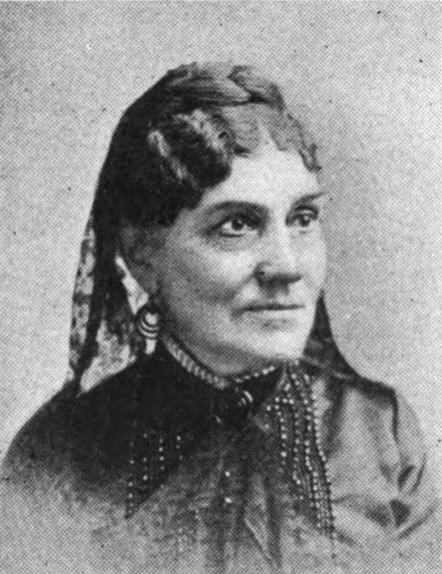
- Born: February 8, 1817; Sutton, New Hampshire, US
- Died: October 27, 1888 (aged 71)
- Occupation: Educator
- Known for: Principal of the first high school for girls in New York City

Lydia Fowler Wadleigh (February 8, 1817 – October 27, 1888) was an American educator, principal of the first high school for girls in New York City, and "lady superintendent" of the precursor to Hunter College.

== Early life and education ==
Lydia Fowler Wadleigh was born in Sutton, New Hampshire, daughter of Benjamin and Polly Marsden Wadleigh. Her father was a county judge. Her cousin was US Senator Bainbridge Wadleigh. She attended New Hampton Literary and Scientific Institution, graduating in 1841.

== Career ==
Miss Wadleigh remained in New Hampton to teach Latin and Greek at her alma mater, and stayed for four years. She also taught at schools elsewhere in New Hampshire, and further from home in Freehold, New Jersey.

In 1855, she was hired as principal at New York City's first public high school for girls, located on 12th Street in Greenwich Village, in part because she was well-qualified to teach Latin. She was known to spend her own money on books and supplies for the school, and even bought and prepared the first diplomas, presented in 1859. From early days, the school was known informally as "Miss Wadleigh's school," and became a popular stop for prominent visitors such as Henry Ward Beecher and Susan B. Anthony. Among the school's alumnae from Wadleigh's era was medical pioneer Mary Putnam Jacobi. During the American Civil War, Wadleigh organized students to sew a flannel flag for display, to sing patriotic songs, and to knit stockings and roll bandages for Union Army troops. Among her students was educator and social reformer Juliet Clannon Cushing.

When the Normal School was founded in 1870, Miss Wadleigh agreed to be its first superintendent. She was also appointed Professor of Ethics at the Normal School. Wadleigh was, again, generous with her time and resources on behalf of the students, helping with tuition or clothing or even shoes when the young women were unable to afford such basics. Wadleigh's Normal School was eventually developed into Hunter College.

== Legacy ==
Lydia Fowler Wadleigh died from cancer at her niece's home on Oxford Street, Brooklyn, in the autumn of 1888. Her death was marked by a standing-room-only funeral at University Place Presbyterian Church, including a eulogy in verse by poet Helen Gray Cone, another alumna.

The Wadleigh High School for Girls, on 114th Street in Harlem, was dedicated in 1903, and named for Lydia Fowler Wadleigh. Today, the building houses the Wadleigh Secondary School for the Performing and Visual Arts.

The Lydia F. Wadleigh and Susan K. Bourne Memorial Alcove at Hunter College features a bust of Wadleigh, bookshelves, stained-glass panel, and the Latin motto Haec olim meminisse juvabit ("In the future it will be pleasant to remember these things," from Virgil).

The Wadleigh Association was organized in 1897, by the alumnae of Miss Wadleigh's schools, "to preserve the sentiment of the old school which did so much for the higher education of women."
