= Yetta Dorothea Geffen =

American musician, journalist and publicist

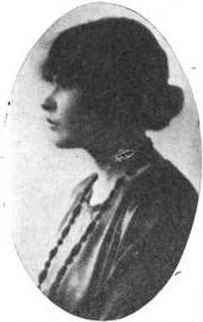
- Yetta Geffen, from a 1919 publication
- Born: December 10, 1891; Boston, Massachusetts, U.S.
- Died: May 21, 1986 (age 94); Longmeadow, Massachusetts, U.S.
- Other names: Jetta Geffen, Jetta Mirkil
- Occupation(s): Musician, publicist, journalist, editor

Yetta Dorothea Geffen (December 10, 1891 – May 21, 1986), also known as Jetta Geffen Mirkil, was an American musician, journalist, and publicist. She went to Europe after World War I to entertain the troops, playing violin in an all-female quintet sponsored by the YMCA.

== Early life ==
Geffen was born in Boston and raised in New York City, the daughter of Charles Geffen and Vera Schneirova Geffen. Her parents were Russian Jewish immigrants. Her father was a painter and a musician. She attended Wadleigh High School for Girls, and trained as a musician at the Institute of Musical Art under Frank Damrosch.

== Career ==
Geffen was a member of the editorial staffs at the New York Press and the Washington Times. She also contributed to the New York Tribune, Musical Courier, The Theatre, and The Musical Observer. She often interviewed musicians and actors, but she also covered the women's suffrage movement, and public health reforms.

In 1916 she appeared in period costume for the Civil War segment of the Great Pageant at Yale. In March 1918 she was a judge at a costume ball in Greenwich Village. In 1919 she was traveling with D. W. Griffith as his press representative. She toured post-war Europe in 1919, playing violin as part of a YMCA-sponsored musical quintet called "Just Girls". She wrote from Europe, "Paris may face a coalless winter and New York begins to look very good to me."

Geffen was also an actress, and did publicity for the Greenwich Village Theatre. In 1925, Geffen was managing director of the Richard Mansfield Players in New London, Connecticut. She managed the Fifth Avenue Playhouse in Greenwich Village in 1926.

== Publications ==
- "The Cabaret Booking Agency" (1913)
- "Clinging Vines No More; Gently Nurtured Women Who Now Incite to Riot" (1914)
- "Gossip Anent Our Spring Coiffure? Is it to be High, Low, False or Real?" (1914)
- "Lou-Tellegen, Newest of Matinee Idols, Makes Love in Six Tongues and Calls American Girl Cultured and 'Tres Chic'" (1914)
- "A Queen of Stage Adventuresses" (1914)
- "Some Recent Hits" (1915)
- "Community Action Remedy for Cruel Waste of Babies' Lives" (1915)
- "Mme. Calve Great Even to her Own Secretary" (1915)
- "Outdoor Music on a Huge Scale" (1916)
- "The Russian Ballet Rehearses" (1916)
- "The Yale Pageant" (1916)
- "Wisdom and Wit from the Lips of Teresa Carreño" (1917)
- "Leopold Godowsky Discusses the Piano and the Universal Brotherhood of Art" (1918)
- "The Romantic Courtship of Gilda Varesi" (1922)

== Personal life ==
Geffen married Hazelton Mirkil, a Philadelphia attorney and World War I veteran, in 1935. He died by suicide a few months later. Her inheritance from his estate was a matter for the courts. She died in 1986, at the age of 94, in Longmeadow, Massachusetts.
