= Gefen LLC =

Gefen LLC (formerly Gefen Inc. and Gefen Systems Inc.) is an American electronics hardware manufacturing company specializing in digital audio/video connectivity products. The company was founded by Hagai Gefen in 1998, and originally located in Woodland Hills, CA. Gefen manufactures a variety of audio/video switchers, splitters, extenders, scalers, and home theater accessories that are typically used for industrial and commercial applications, as well as consumer applications such as home theaters. In 2006 Gefen LLC. was purchased by Nortek Inc., and in 2015 was merged with another Nortek company, Core Brands LLC.

Gefen was the first adopter (not founder or affiliate) of HDMI, which became a predominant consumer content delivery format. Gefen LLC builds products designed to work in-between a source and display, to aid in the video routing/distribution process. A Gefen DisplayPort adapter was available directly through the Apple Store to coincide with the release of the 2009 iMac. As of 2013 they introduced a line of home automation devices. Gefen received notoriety for its digital signage line that was utilized in the 2010 X Games. Gefen has recently focused on IP based video distribution as well as software to enhance existing hardware solutions. In 2014, Gefen Syner-G software was released, allowing for IP management and control of Gefen products. Gefen is currently a supplier for behind the scenes 4k and 1080p distribution systems at many audio/video retail locations, including the nation's largest retailer.
