= Evelina Lopez Antonetty =

Puerto Rican civil rights activist (1922–1984)

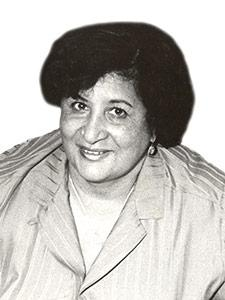
- Born: Evelina Lopez; September 19, 1922; Salinas, Puerto Rico
- Died: November 19, 1984 (aged 62); Bronx, New York, U.S.
- Other names: Hell Lady of the Bronx or The Mother of the Puerto Rican Community
- Occupation: Community activist
- Known for: United Bronx Parents
- Spouses: Binaldo Montenegro, Donato Antonetty
- Children: 3

Evelina Lopez Antonetty (1922−1984) was a Puerto Rican civil rights and education activist whose work primarily focused on Puerto Rican children in New York City. Antonetty started United Bronx Parents in South Bronx, New York which helped with bilingual classes, school lunches, and increased community involvement. Antonetty's work played a large role in why schools across the United States now have bilingual education.

As of 2016, United Bronx Parents remains active in school systems and has spread throughout the U.S. Antonetty was greatly recognized as an organized and strong leader.

== Early life ==
Antonetty was born on September 19, 1922, into a poor family in Salinas, a small fishing village in Puerto Rico. She grew up as the eldest of three daughters. Her mother, Eva Cruz Lopez, sent her to live in New York with her aunt and uncle in 1933 when Antonetty was 11 years old. She went to public school in East Harlem, Wadleigh High School for Girls which was considered one of the best schools in the city. Her family moved around a lot within the Latino community. They were part of the working poor in Harlem but were relatively fortunate as Eva had a steady job. Her activism stemmed from her childhood of poverty growing up in Puerto Rico and then the exposition of the progressive politics of the Great Depression after her emigration to New York City. Her experience with rejection and discrimination in the public school district motivated her to reach out and want to help other children like her.

== Career ==
In Antonetty’s teenage years, she worked for multiple political leaders, which drew her interest to political activism. She worked for Congressman Vito Marcantonio, an Italian-American man from Harlem, and Jesús Colón, a Puerto Rican born labor leader. With the experience of working for Marcantonio and Colón, she moved to South Bronx where she worked for District 65 of the United Auto Workers, preparing people to enter the job force. Once she married her second husband, Donato Antonetty, she decided to stay home and raise her three children while her husband worked. When her daughter, Anita, started school in 1962, she decided to join the school’s parents association, which eventually led to her creating the United Bronx Parents.

== United Bronx Parents ==
Founded by Evelina Antonetty and established in 1965, the United Bronx Parents encouraged parents in the South Bronx community to become more involved in their children’s education. The program provided training sessions to better inform parents on the evaluations of schools regarding the types of teachers and the types of educational programs that schools had to offer. Evelina Antonetty hoped that the United Bronx Parents would diminish the idea that poverty, rather than inequality, was why minorities were not able to get an education. In the late 1960s, the goal of the program shifted to trying to increase bilingual education, which was realized in 1968, when South Bronx implemented bilingual schools. The United Bronx program originally set out to help Puerto Rican parents become more involved in the New York educational system. However, due to its success, it also began involving African American mothers and expanding to other cities within New York and throughout the country.

== Legacy ==
In 2011, a mural was painted in the South Bronx honoring her work and dedication for the United Bronx Parents.
