= Mildred McAdory =

American organizer and activist (1915–1988)

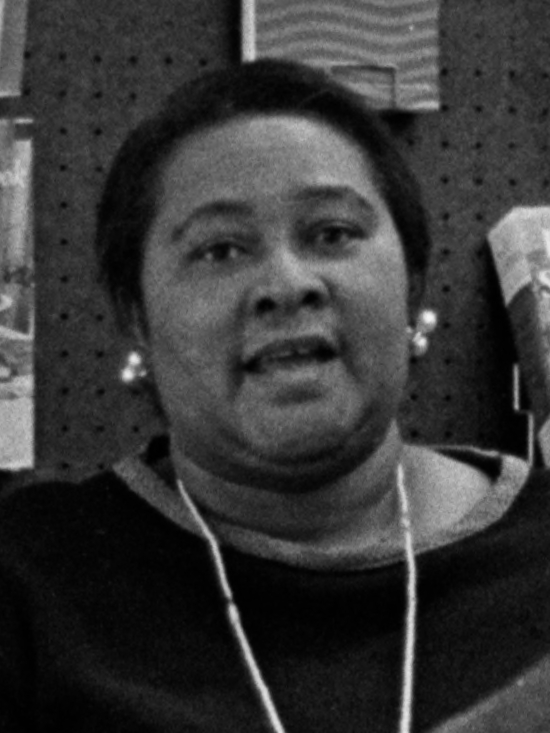
- McAdory in 1968
- Born: June 23, 1915; Homewood, Alabama, US
- Died: November 1988 (aged 73)
- Other name: Mildred McAdory Edelman
- Occupations: Organizer, community leader, activist
- Political party: Communist Party USA
- Other political affiliations: People's Party

Mildred McAdory (sometimes Mildred McAdory Edelman; June 23, 1915 – November 1988) was an American community organizer and civil rights activist.

Originally a domestic worker in Alabama, McAdory was an organizer for the Communist Party USA and the Southern Negro Youth Congress. Her activism was inhibited, such as in 1942, when she was arrested for interfering with a sign denoting the colored section on a bus in Fairfield. She later moved to New York City, where she worked as a reporter and labor organizer. She unsuccessfully ran for both the New York State Assembly and the United States Senate.

== Early life ==
McAdory was born on June 23, 1915, in Homewood, Alabama. She was one of three children born to Crittle McAdory (died March 1943) and Irving McAdory (died 1936), the latter a market gardener and miner. Despite being the only black miner in his community, he was respected; he represented two fellow miners in court c. 1920, and also signed checks for the men, as the two were illiterate. McAdory began attending school at age five. Her mother lied, stating she was seven years old, for her to be allowed to attend. In an interview, McAdory said that she began to develop her beliefs after witnessing a white superintendent call a black teacher by her first name, a sign of disrespect. She attended a private high school, which her father funded the tuition of. In high school, she played for the basketball and track and field teams. During the Great Depression, McAdory's family established a small farm.

Following high school, McAdory became a domestic worker, due to a lack of other jobs available. She later attended a private college in Alabama. On August 11, 1932, she married Samuel Steele; they had one child, Stephen (died May 1951). They divorced in 1942. She later married Joe Edelman.

== Career ==
=== Early career ===
McAdory was recruited to the Southern Negro Youth Congress (SNYC) by Esther Cooper Jackson and Dorothy Burnham. McAdory first worked for the SNYC as a clerk, and in 1939, became a staffer and served as director the SNYC's Fairfield Recreational Youth Center, a center which hosted classes and activities. As director, she helped increase its membership to 300 and its participance to 1,500. On August 10, 1940, she attempted to vote in an election. Despite passing the voter requirements, her vote was voided, and on July 30, 1942, Arthur Shores filed a lawsuit on her behalf to the circuit court, seeking $5,000 in damages and an injunction. The jury ruled against her.

=== Arrest ===
On December 12, 1942, McAdory boarded a bus travelling from Fairfield to Birmingham. She sat in the full colored section, which was signified by both a removable wooden board and a line on the roof of the bus. A second board stood, in the colored section, two rows behind the first one. Two men boarded the bus and sat in the row ahead of McAdory, sitting atop the wooden booard, which at some point had been removed.

The bus driver ordered the men to move behind the board and called the police after the men declined. The police ordered the four to exit the bus and enter the police car, which McAdory refused. Police threatened to beat her when she asked what she was being charged with. They left without taking McAdory. Afterward, she and another black man willingly exited the bus, after which the bus driver kicked her in the back while she was exiting and yelled to the police to arrest her also, which they did.

During questioning, McAdory claimed to not know who moved the board. While being processed, an officer kicked her in the back, slapped her in the face, punched her in the shoulder, and hit her on the hip with a baton. McAdory was then brought to a holding cell occupied by five other women. In an interview, she described the cell being swarmed with cockroaches, and her mattress being as "hard and dirty". She did not receive a phone call or bail. According to McAdory, the police officer who arrested her and bus driver gave false testimonies during the trial. She later said she should have shown the bruises underneath her skirt, despite objection from her attorney, again Arthur Shores. She was fined $10. She appealed the case, and in March 1944, was not awarded damages for the incident.

The story of McAdory's arrest was published in For Common Courtesy on Common Carriers, an SNYC pamphlet. It also spawned the creation of the short-lived Citizens Committee for Equal Accommodations on Common Carriers, which advocated for racial equality on public transport. She and James E. Jackson organized a boycott on Birmingham's buses for a short time. She spoke about the incident at events across Alabama; at one, in 1943, at Dexter Avenue Baptist Church, she met a young Martin Luther King Jr..

=== Later career and death ===
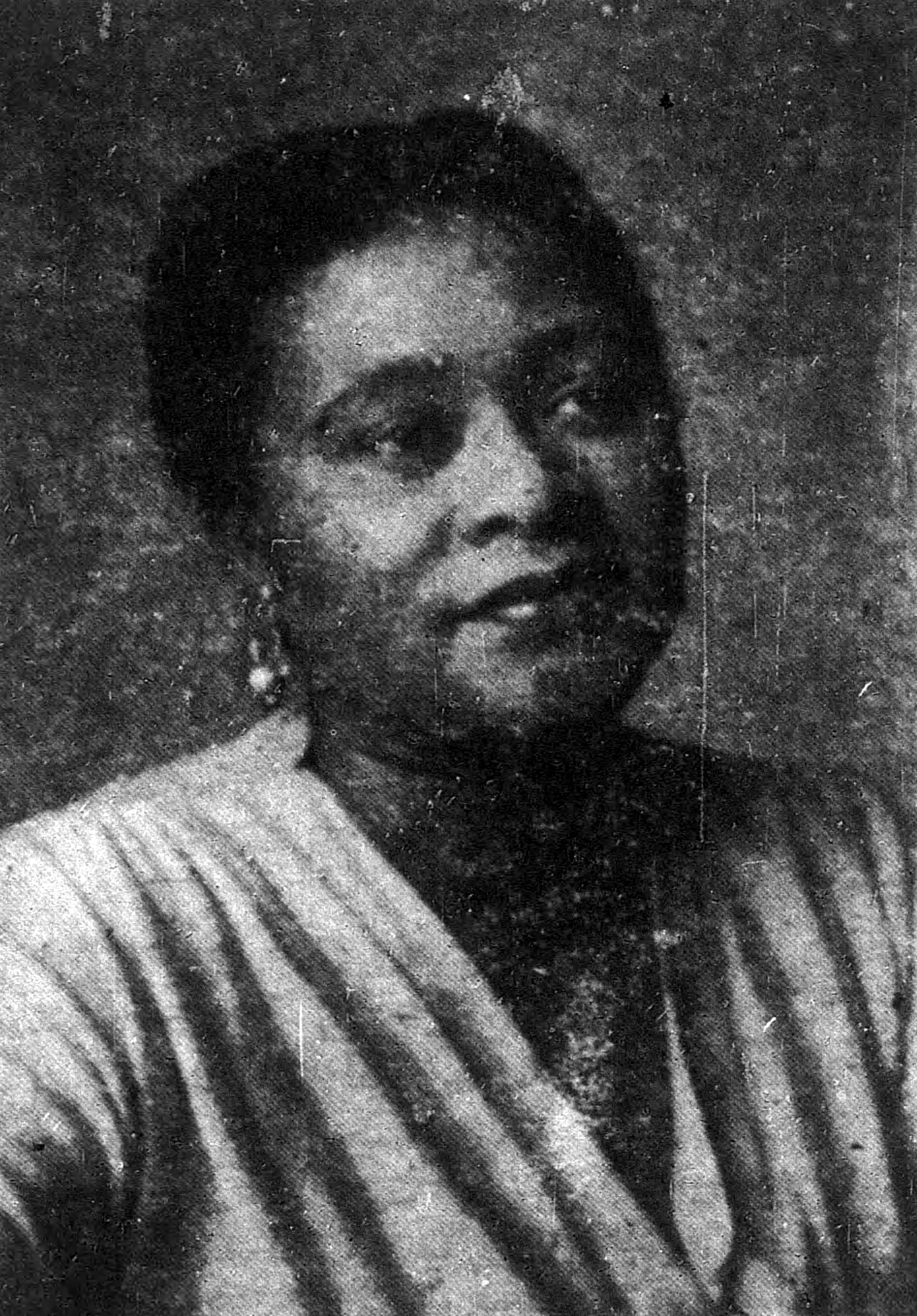
McAdory in 1963

In the third quarter of 1944, McAdory moved to New York City to work as a switchboard operator for the Daily Worker, later becoming a reporter. She suggested the paper simplify the wording of its articles after learning some of its readers did not know the reasons as to the arrest of politician Benjamin J. Davis Jr.; she was fired for making the suggestion. After departing from the paper, she became an organizer for the United Furniture Workers of America, a trade union, and for the Communist Party USA (CPUSA). As a member of the CPUSA, she spoke at multiple of its events, including the 1947 national convention. For some time, she headed the United Harlem Tenants and Consumers Organization, a housing rights organization. In 1949, she worked as a switchboard operator for the headquarters of the New York County Communist Party.

In the 1960s, McAdory served as chairwoman of the Harlem Communist Party. Due to her communist activities, she was surveiled by the Federal Bureau of Investigation, beginning in the early 1940s.

In 1960, McAdory and Arnold Johnson ran for the New York State Assembly in the 13th district; McAdory ran on a dual ticket of the CPUSA and the People's Party. During a campaign event on August 23, police attacked her husband after he criticized hecklers. As they left the event, a group of 150 surrounded her vehicle to block attackers. She and Johnson were later removed from the ballot due to not having filed as part of a communist-action organization, a violation of the McCarran Internal Security Act. On June 3, 1963, she appeared before the Subversive Activities Control Board due to her violations of the McCarran Act. The Daily World claimed McAdory and other communists faced prison sentences because of this. Their removal was challenged by four Democrats in a complaint to the New York State Board of Elections. In 1974, she unsuccessfully ran for the United States Senate with the CPUSA.

In 1968, McAdory worked at the Benjamin J. Davis Bookstore, in New York City. She died in November 1988, aged 73.

== Sources ==
- Winters, Andrew J. (2018). "Seed of Resistance," "Symbol of Struggle": The Radical Life of Mildred McAdory, 1915-1988 (MA thesis). North Carolina Central University. ProQuest 10981234.
