= Esther Cooper Jackson =

American civil rights activist (1917–2022)

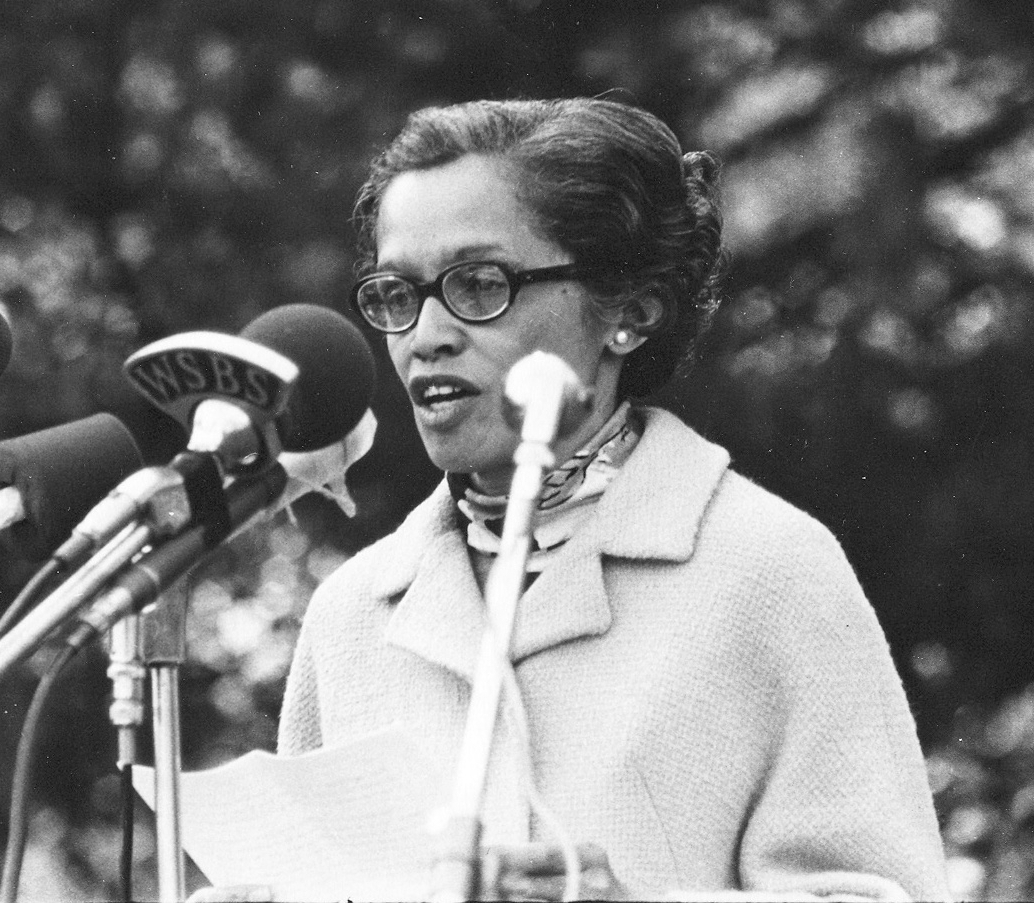
- Jackson in 1968
- Born: Esther Victoria Cooper; August 21, 1917; Arlington, Virginia, U.S.
- Died: August 23, 2022 (aged 105); Boston, Massachusetts, U.S.
- Education: Oberlin College; Fisk University
- Occupations: Civil rights activist, social worker
- Known for: Freedomways
- Spouse: James E. Jackson (m. 1941; died 2007)
- Children: 2

Esther Victoria Cooper Jackson (August 21, 1917 – August 23, 2022) was an American civil rights activist and social worker. She worked with Shirley Graham Du Bois, W. E. B. Du Bois, Edward Strong, and Louis E. Burnham, and was one of the founding editors of the magazine Freedomways, a theoretical, political and literary journal published from 1961 to 1985. She also served as organizational and executive secretary at the Southern Negro Youth Congress.

== Early life and career ==
Jackson was born on August 21, 1917, in Arlington, Virginia, to George Posea Cooper and Esther Georgia Irving Cooper, who served as president of the Arlington branch of the NAACP. She attended segregated schools as a child. She earned a bachelor's degree at Oberlin College in 1938 and a master's degree in sociology from Fisk University in 1940. Her 1940 thesis was "The Negro Woman Domestic Worker in Relation to Trade Unionism". Upon graduation, she received a Rosenwald Fellowship to support a study on the attitudes of black youth toward World War II. She had been planning to conduct the study as part of her studies for a Ph.D. in sociology at the University of Chicago.

Of her upbringing and family, Jackson recounted:

Our parents always told us that if we got the grades, and passed the tests, that they would make sure that we would go to any college of our choice. So, they didn't go in for a lot of expensive furniture or anything else—we had lots of books, and at home reading of poetry, we had the Harvard Classics and all that. Their values were passed on to us.

In 1945 she was a delegate to the World Youth Congress in London and served as the chairman of the American Subcommittee on Problems of Dependent Peoples.

After graduate school, Jackson became a member of the staff of the Voting Project in Birmingham, Alabama, for the Southern Negro Youth Congress (SNYC). While working with SNYC she met her future husband James E. Jackson, a Marxist theoretician who would work as a labor organizer and an official in the Communist Party USA. In a 2004 interview, she explained that her husband and the SNYC had in 1937 helped tobacco workers in Virginia successfully agitate for an eight-hour day and pay increases. The tobacco workers held the first strike in Virginia since 1905, and their gains, according to C. Alvin Hughes, "helped SNYC earn a following among the black working class in the South".

Originally intending only to stay for one summer, Jackson remained in Alabama for seven years, engaged in the struggle to bring down Jim Crow segregation. As a prominent leader of SNYC, Esther Cooper Jackson worked with her husband, Louis and Dorothy Burnham, Ed Strong, Sallye and Frank Davis—parents of the Davis sisters, Angela and Fania—and numerous others, conducting many campaigns promoting the rights of blacks and poor whites. SNYC's agitation for the integration of the public transportation systems was important in preparation for the struggles later on in the 1950s and 1960s.

== Freedomways ==
In New York City in 1961, Jackson became managing editor of Freedomways, created by Esther Jackson, along with Louis Burnham, Jack O'Dell from the Southern Christian Leadership Conference, and writer Lorraine Hansberry. Freedomways was the central theoretical journal of the 20th century black arts and intellectual movement in the United States. From its launch in 1961, it attracted historians, sociologists, economists, artists, workers, and students to write on black history, heritage, and culture. Jackson would call it "a tool for the liberation of our people". Freedomways published international poets such as Pablo Neruda and Derek Walcott, African leaders including Kwame Nkrumah, Julius K. Nyerere, Agostinho Neto, and Jomo Kenyatta, and Caribbean leftist C. L. R. James, as well as African-American authors such as James Baldwin, Alice Walker, Paul Robeson, Nikki Giovanni, and Lorraine Hansberry. The most prominent African-American artists like Jacob Lawrence, Romare Bearden, and Elizabeth Catlett contributed cover art gratis to support the magazine, which was read worldwide. Uniting the Southern and Northern US civil rights struggles of the 1960s with an international viewpoint taking in Pan-Africanism and other cultural and political currents, the magazine is often viewed as a precursor of the Black Arts Movement.

== Personal life ==
Jackson and her husband, James E. Jackson, married in 1941, and had two children. They moved to Brooklyn in 1951, and remained married until his death in 2007. In 2015, Jackson moved to a retirement facility in Boston, where she died on August 23, 2022, two days after her 105th birthday.

== Works ==
- The Negro Woman Domestic Worker in Relation to Trade Unionism, M.A. thesis, Fisk University, 1940, excerpts reprinted in Viewpoint Magazine 5 (October 2015). OCLC 60976760.
- "This Is My Husband: Fighter for His People, Political Refugee". National Committee to Defend Negro Leadership. 1953.
- Esther Cooper Jackson and Constance Pohl (2000). Freedomways Reader: Prophets in Their Own Country: Interventions—Theory and Contemporary Politics. Boulder: Westview Press.
