= Louis E. Burnham =

African-American activist and journalist (1915–1960)

Louis Everett Burnham
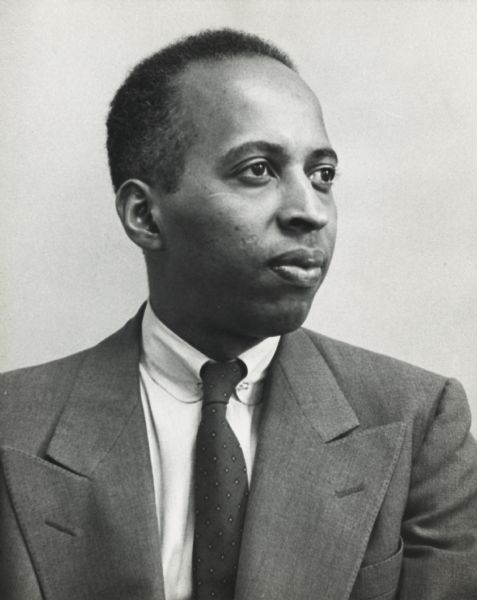
- Born: September 29, 1915; Harlem or Barbados
- Died: February 12, 1960 (aged 44); New York City, US
- Burial place: Woodlawn Cemetery, Bronx, New York
- Education: City College of New York
- Occupations: Activist, editor, writer
- Years active: 1932–1960
- Employer(s): Southern Negro Youth Congress, Progressive Party, Freedom, National Guardian
- Organization(s): Frederick Douglass Society, Harlem Youth Congress, National Negro Congress, Young Communist League, Alabama Committee for Human Welfare
- Known for: Activism, journalism
- Notable work: Behind the lynching of Emmett Louis Till, creation and management of and columns in Freedom, columns in National Guardian
- Political party: Communist Party, USA
- Movement: Civil rights movement, Voting rights
- Opponents: Bull Connor; FBI
- Board member of: Southern Conference Educational Fund
- Spouse: Dorothy (née Challenor) Burnham
- Children: Claudia Burnham; Margaret Burnham; Linda Burnham; Charles Burnham
- Relatives: Forbes Burnham

Signature
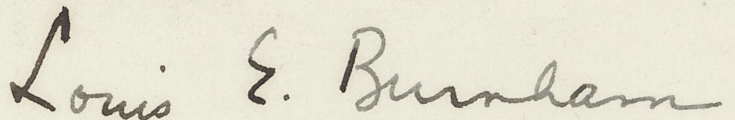

Louis Everett Burnham (September 29, 1915 – February 12, 1960) was an African-American activist and journalist. He was involved in activities emphasizing racial equality, through various left-wing organizations, campaigns and publications in both the northern and southern United States, particularly in New York City and Birmingham, Alabama.

== Biography ==
=== Childhood and education ===
Louis Everett Burnham was born in Harlem, in New York City, although some sources have him born in Barbados. His parents were Charles Breechford Burnham and Louise St. Clair Williams Burnham, immigrants from Barbados. Louise was a cousin of future Guyanese Prime Minister Forbes Burnham. He grew up in a household with a strong racial consciousness, as his mother was a follower of the black nationalist and Pan-Africanist Marcus Garvey, and owned stock in Garvey's Black Star Line. She worked as a hairdresser and ran a rotating credit association, a system known as "partners," or "partnerhand" in the Caribbean, during the interwar period. She raised Louis in a brownstone at 253 West 139th Street on Harlem's Strivers' Row that she bought with her savings. His father worked as a building superintendent. Both parents were churchgoers. Burnham's daughter recalled growing up with her parents and grandparents, in "a close family."

In 1932, Burnham graduated from Townsend High School. By his college years, he was an accomplished violinist, and some ten years later was credited with the lyrics for a song on which his brother, Charles St. Clair Burnham, one year older, held the copyright. He was regularly on the Dean's List at City College of New York (CCNY), where he was able to stay solvent by writing papers for middle-class White students on a variety of subjects. During this period he was executive director of the Harlem Youth Congress. Burnham studied social science at CCNY. As a college student, he became interested in the civil rights movement. He helped organize the American Student Union (ASU), a mostly White youth organization, and was president of the Frederick Douglass Society, the Black student organization. During Burnham's leadership of the Frederick Douglass Society, pressure from that organization pushed CCNY to create its first course in African-American history, whose instructor, Dr. Max Yergan, was CCNY's first Black faculty member.

Traces of Burnham's student activism survive in the archives of CCNY, including in their "official student newspaper," The Campus. The newspaper lists him as part of a committee preparing an anti-war strike. A leaflet lists him as a speaker at the rally indicated by the newspaper article. Later he was chairman of the Anti-war and Anti-Fascist Committee, preparing a memorial for an aviator, a former newsman, killed in the Spanish Civil War. Although he is listed in these news articles as a member of the class of 1937, he spoke on campus on April 16, 1940, in support of an anti-lynching bill.

Burnham organized the first chapters of the ASU and the Harlem Youth Congress. Burnham was the Youth Secretary of the National Negro Congress, an umbrella organization of civic, labor and religious groups. As a student, he had also been Vice President of the student council. His prominence in these various organizations was due to both his congeniality and his magnetism as a speaker on racial injustice, the danger of fascism to world peace, and the problems of American young people and the many unemployed during the Great Depression. Following graduation, Burnham took a year of law school at St. John's University School of Law in Queens, New York.

=== New York City ===
In the mid-1930s, Burnham became involved with widespread Harlem protests against Italy's invasion of Ethiopia in 1935, and with the injustice being done to the teenage Scottsboro Boys, condemned to death on a false accusation of raping two White women. During this period, he joined the Young Communist League and the Communist Party, USA (CPUSA). The CPUSA had become widely known for opposing racism and racial segregation, especially following its organizing the Scottsboro Boys' legal defense. (Burnham had ideological commitments equal to Communism's Marxism and Leninism. He was as much influenced by Mahatma Gandhi, W. E. B. Du Bois, and the international anti-colonial struggle, for instance suggesting in 1944 the formation of a Black political party of "Non-Violence and Non-Cooperation.") In 1939, Burnham joined the Southern Negro Youth Congress (SNYC), becoming its organizational secretary in 1941.

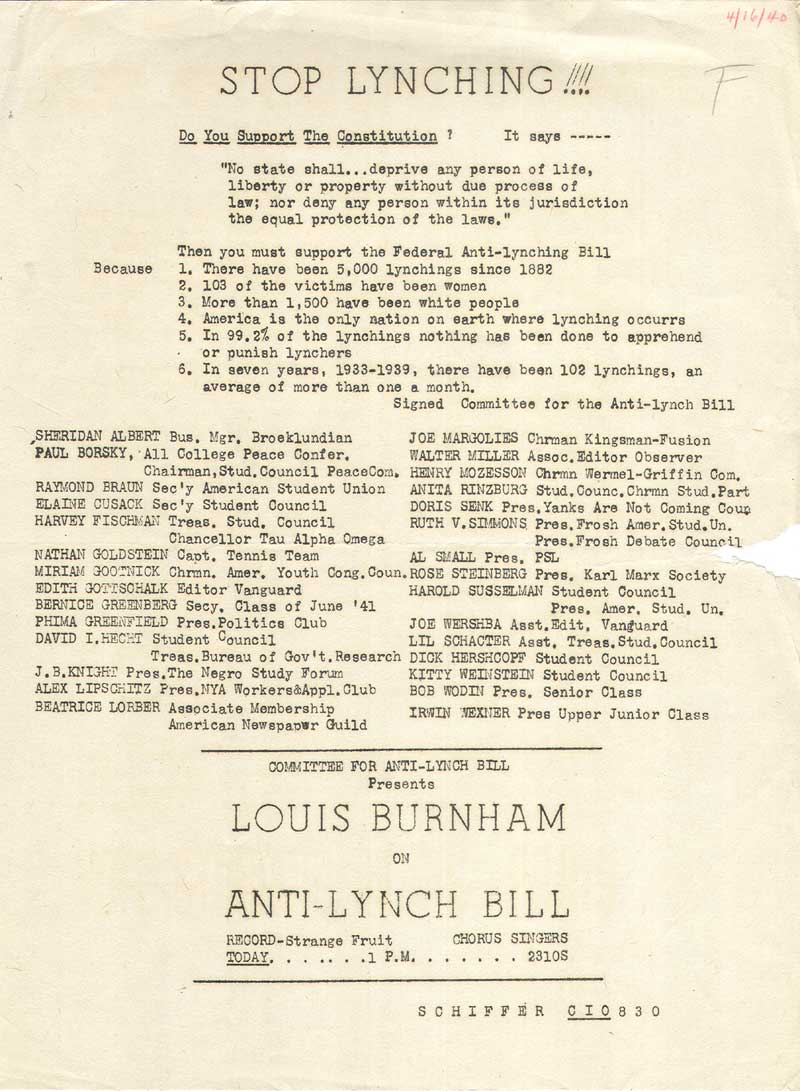
Handbill with Burnham as featured speaker, City College of New York, April 1940

In the spring and summer of 1939, Burnham brought the historian Herbert Aptheker with him on an organizing trip to the south. Aptheker had written about Black slave revolts and taught at the New York Workers School, where he had met Burnham. Burnham aimed to bring tobacco field workers into the Tobacco Workers International Union. The pair traveled to Virginia, North Carolina, Georgia and Tennessee. They carried hundreds of copies of two Aphtheker pamphlets, one about Black slave revolts, the other about Black participation in the Civil War, in Burnham's car. Burnham arranged for Aptheker to lecture about Black resistance to slavery at organizing meetings in the cities and towns on their route. Ultimately they sold all of Aptheker's booklets.

In 1940, Burnham ran unsuccessfully on the American Labor Party ticket for the New York State Assembly, where he was defeated by the four-term Democratic Assemblyman William T. Andrews, getting about 9.5% of the votes (i.e., over 3,100) in the Harlem district where President Franklin D. Roosevelt was getting five in six votes. In 1941, he married Dorothy Challenor, a Black youth activist leader who had studied biology at Brooklyn College. Their move to Birmingham, which had become the headquarters of SNYC, was part of their effort to oppose racial segregation and to organize Black youth. Burnham's efforts to organize southern Black youth through SNYC were far more effective than they had been via ASU, as those youth were much more inclined to trust an organizer from a Black organization than one from a predominantly white one. SNYC encouraged the black communist couples among its members, the Burnhams among them, to consider the politics of personal life, thereby anticipating a later feminism's "the personal is political." In response, Burnham and other SNYC men shared household chores and child-rearing.

In October 1941, Burnham became co-editor of the SNYC magazine Cavalcade: The March of Southern Negro Youth, with its original editor, Augusta Jackson, later Augusta Strong after her marriage to one of SNYC'S founders, Edward Strong. The October issue reversed the magazine's previous antiwar stance, coinciding with Germany's sudden wartime attack on the Soviet Union. Issues usually included some art, short fiction or poetry, with a continued focus on the difficulties facing the largely rural southern Black population.

=== Birmingham, Alabama ===
In 1942, Burnham joined the SNYC staff in Birmingham, Alabama. In Birmingham, Burnham worked on Black voting rights and planning Black cultural events, in addition to SNYC administrative work. He lectured to local activists on the world's anti-colonial movement and considered that the Second World War opened doors to revolutionary consciousness for people of color globally. With Birmingham as his base, Burnham helped to establish several SNYC chapters at southern Black college campuses.

With Esther Cooper (later Esther Cooper Jackson after her marriage to James E. Jackson), Burnham co-led a six-member SNYC delegation in May 1942 that visited federal offices in Washington, D.C. They conferred with Secretary of the Navy Frank Knox and Attorney General Francis Biddle, as well as a half dozen other officials. The meetings were designed to advance proposals to integrate southern Black youth into the war effort. The visit typified SNYC's ongoing activism during the war on behalf of desegregation of the military, defense industry jobs for Black workers, and elimination of the poll tax in support of Black voters. Burnham appears in a photograph where he addresses a right to vote rally in New Orleans, in 1943.

A sample of SNYC's aims and projects can be found in Burnham's organizational report at the 1942 Atlanta joint meeting of SNYC's advisory board and National Council. The proposals were:

- Creating some active councils in Alabama, Tennessee and Louisiana, to gain 3,000 new members in those areas by SNYC's sixth anniversary.
- Establishing six more industrial youth centers in New Orleans and cities and towns in Alabama.
- Creating councils on college campuses in the states mentioned above, and in Atlanta.
- Three campaigns: "expand opportunities for Negro youth to service in flying services of Army and Navy;" voting and education for citizenship; developing opportunities for war industry jobs and training.

All of the proposals in Burnham's report passed.

As a result of SNYC's efforts during this period, Birmingham opened their first municipal swimming pool for Blacks, which of course was racially segregated.

In 1943, Burnham spoke about the role of Black youth during the ongoing world war on the CBS sponsored Black radio program “Wings over Jordan.” He discussed the widespread view of war in the South, saying that any student was “likely to witness in front of his school building an Army jeep populated with soldiers from a nearby camp... He may talk to the soldiers... In all of this he finds himself drawn closer to the war effort, he finds added stimulation for the purchase of war stamps and bonds.” Burnham said that Black youth who weren't in the military, by buying war stamps and bonds, “unusual sacrifices and small acts of self-denial,” could participate in the war effort.

In 1944, Burnham was the provisional secretary of the Association of Young Writers and Artists (AYWA), which was affiliated with SNYC. This organization's aim was to involve Black youth in the various fields of the arts, both as individuals and in groups. It hoped to bring their work to the general public and strengthen the understanding of the relationship between culture and events and trends in society. Burnham offered a $10 cash award, as well AYWA medals, for the best contributions interpreting Howard Fast's novel of the U.S. Reconstruction era, Freedom Road, in such disparate media as poetry, drama and sculpture, among others.

In 1945, a Black man from Laurel, Mississippi, Willie McGee, was tried, convicted, and condemned to death by an all-white jury, on dubious rape charges. The attorney in charge of his appeal contacted Burnham. Almost two weeks after the jury found McGee guilty, Burnham traveled to Laurel to interview the principals in the case. Subsequently, he sent a report on the case to George Marshall, then the head of the New York-based National Federation for Constitutional Liberties. A study of the McGee case concludes that Burnham's "detailed and accurate [memo]... was one of the most reliable things ever written about the case."

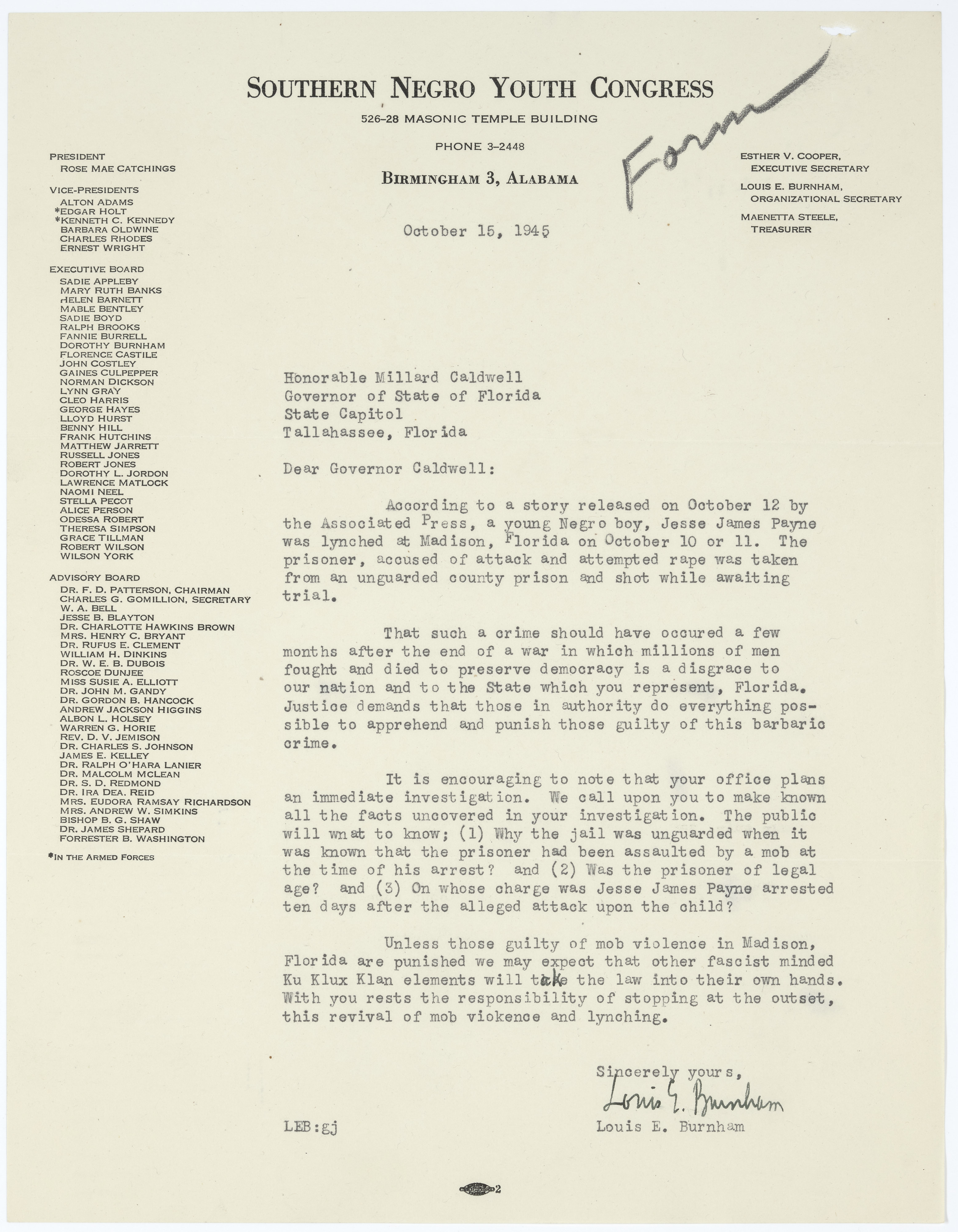
Louis E. Burnham letter to Florida Governor Millard Caldwell regarding lynching of Jesse James Payne

In October of that year, Burnham corresponded with Florida governor Millard F. Caldwell, seeking justice for lynching victim Jesse James Payne, a sharecropper in his late twenties. Burnham followed up with the governor, after the Governor responded to Burnham with a brief letter dated the following day.

Immediately following the Second World War, SNYC worked intensively on voter registration of returning veterans and eliminating the poll tax that Alabama and other Southern states used to prevent Blacks from voting. Burnham helped organize voter registration campaigns, lunch counter sit-ins and non-violent marches. In 1946, Burnham led Black veterans of the Second World War on marches in Birmingham to demand the right to vote, which Blacks were largely denied throughout the South.

In 1946, as SNYC was organizing a Southern Youth Legislature in Columbia, South Carolina, Burnham joined with activists from South Carolina to create a Leadership Training School in nearby Irmo. Participants included union-affiliated workers, teachers, and college students from throughout the South, many intending to start their own local SNYC chapters. The Southern Youth Legislature drew more than 1,500 delegates and some 5000 visitors, the "biggest interracial gathering in the history of South Carolina." With World War II having just concluded, the word "war" was often used in speeches, such as Burnham's, urging the attendees to "make war on white supremacy vandals who seek to turn the clock back on progress."

Also in 1946, American Youth for Democracy published Burnham's pamphlet, Smash the Chains. It includes a number of anecdotes of instances of discrimination against Southern Black men, a letter from the activist James E. Jackson, a brief history of Black people in the United States, a penultimate section on both the progress and the oppression that Black people are in the midst of, and a brief interview by Orson Welles with the grieving parents of a Black World War II hero. The back page includes an exhortation to join and contribute to SNYC:

You cannot afford to sit this one out.

In urban centers, rural areas and on college campuses, the crusade proceeds in the fields of citizenship education, veterans' welfare, cultural expression, vocational training and interracial unity. The aims of the SNYC are the simple aims of the vast majority of American citizens.

In one instance of Burnham's activism in Birmingham, he acted with thirty-one local activists to reestablish an Alabama chapter of the Southern Conference for Human Welfare (SCHW). In 1942, he attended an integrated SCHW conference in Nashville at a segregated hotel along with Virginia Foster Durr, Mary McLeod Bethune, Jim Dombrowski, Charles S. Johnson and Eleanor Roosevelt; at the hotel, Burnham evaded segregationist strictures by putting a towel around his head and telling the hotel staff that he was from India. Among other efforts, the Alabama Committee for Human Welfare worked on the case of Recy Taylor, who had been kidnapped and raped by white men. In another example of his activities, in 1947 he joined a number of distinguished southern representatives of the professions and labor as a founding board member of the Southern Conference Educational Fund.

SNYC meets Senator Taylor, center, with Burnham left of Taylor, sharing paper

Burnham got into trouble with the authorities in Birmingham, where the police commissioner was "Bull" Connor, who became internationally notorious in 1963 for turning dogs and fire hoses on Black children protesting racial segregation. In one incident, Connor arrested Burnham for sitting down with a White colleague in a racially segregated, Blacks-only restaurant.

In 1947, Burnham was part of a SNYC delegation to Washington, D.C. that met with U. S. Senator Glen Taylor. Senator Taylor later joined SNYC's 1948 annual convention, where he skirmished with police over entering through the "Blacks only" entrance.

In 1948, as SNYC prepared for that convention, Birmingham police escorted Burnham to Connor's office. Connor read to Burnham from a SNYC flyer promoting the event, challenging the descriptions of the conditions that Blacks faced there: "Young Southerners oppressed and beaten... Young Southerners burned and hung... Young Southerners suffering the daily injustices of Klansmen's law." Connor, himself a Klan supporter, denied the presence of the Klan in Birmingham to Burnham, but threatened its arrival if the convention proceeded. Connor threatened Burnham personally: "Why, you’re the Executive Secretary of the organization—Why, that ain’t no job, you should be working in the mills or the mines. I ought to lock you up for vagrancy." The next day, Birmingham police murdered a teenage SNYC member.

Burnham's April 30 telegram to President Truman's Attorney General (and later Supreme Court Justice) Tom Clark framed the matter clearly: "Every type of intimidation is being used by the Birmingham Commissioner of Public Safety, Eugene Bull Conner, and his officers to deprive our organization of the right to free assemblage in holding our biennial meeting scheduled to open today... [T]he constituted authority of Birmingham offers us no protection." The telegram was unavailing. Despite Clark's other efforts on behalf of civil rights for Black people, there was no help from Washington.

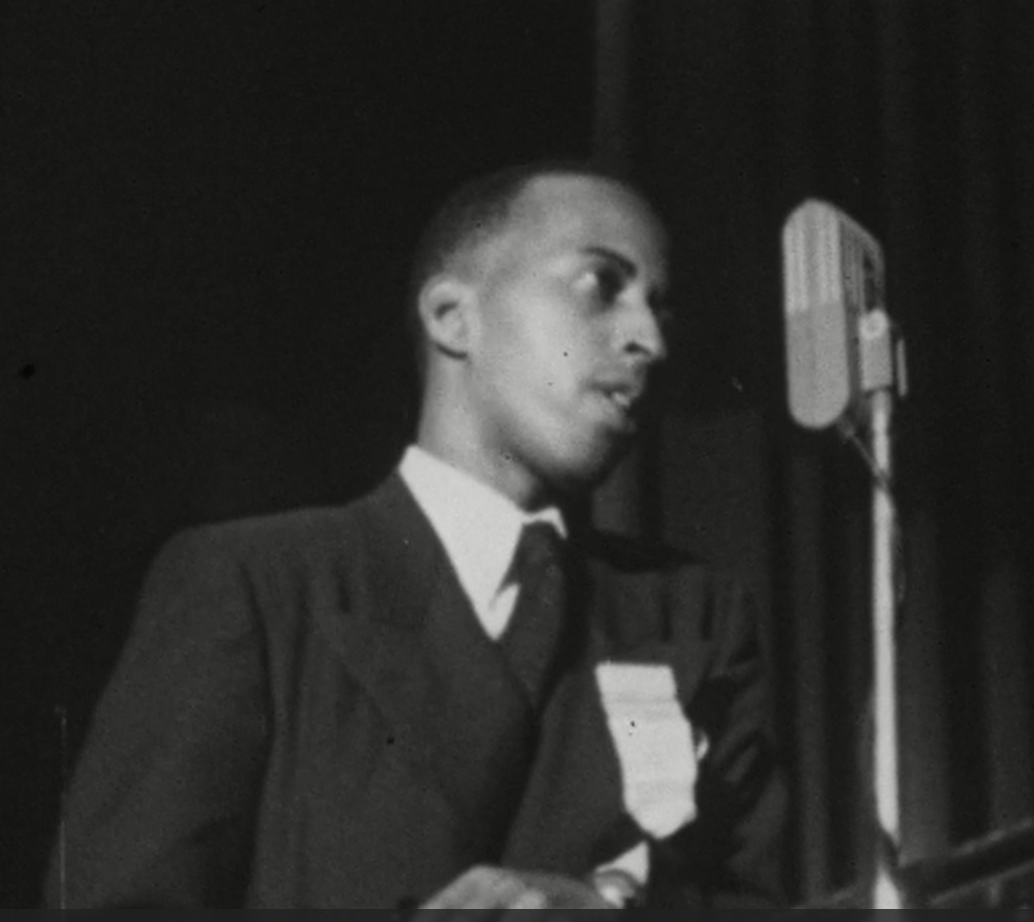
Burnham speaking to the Progressive Party convention, Philadelphia 1948

That year, the Progressive Party was a vehicle for the unsuccessful Presidential campaign of 1941–1945 Vice President Henry A. Wallace. Burnham co-directed Wallace's southern effort along with Palmer Weber. Burnham appears briefly in Carl Marzani's promotional film of the party's organizing convention in Philadelphia, where he is identified as the Vice Chairman for Alabama. Burnham traveled with Wallace's small entourage on a caravan through Alabama, occasionally seeing close up the violence with which the crowd targeted the candidate. Burnham could influence Wallace's views, as shown by Burnham's objection to a Wallace speech in Decatur, Alabama. Wallace had spoken approvingly of some Alabama favorites: the Bankhead family (William and Tallulah), the TVA, the University of Alabama football team—but without mentioning either Alabama's famous Black agricultural scientist George Washington Carver, or its impoverished rural conditions. Wallace accepted Burnham's criticism.

(Also in 1948, in reaction to President Truman's efforts on behalf of Black Americans, Southern segregationists temporarily left the Democratic Party and formed the Dixiecrats; their presidential candidate, Senator Strom Thurmond, won four southern states, an indication of hardening racist sentiment across the South.)

The same year Burnham promoted a campaign for federal investigation into the murder of a resident of Akron, Ohio, Samuel Bacon, arrested and killed by a Mississippi Town Marshal for refusing to give up his bus seat to a White man. But during this period, SNYC lost the support of the Black community and organized labor, due to political repression. The Burnhams remained in Birmingham until the SNYC office closed in 1949.

The Burnhams had two daughters in Birmingham: Claudia in 1943 and Margaret in 1944. Another, Linda, was born in Brooklyn in 1948. She lived with them in Birmingham until they all moved back to New York City the following year, to the Bedford-Stuyvesant neighborhood in Brooklyn, where their son Charles was born in 1950. Others from SNYC in Birmingham relocated to Brooklyn around the same time, including the Strongs (who lived in Brooklyn across the street from the Burnhams) and the Jacksons. This group, all with young children, formed a mutually supportive community amidst the fears engendered by the persecutions of the McCarthy period.

=== Freedom, the National Guardian and Freedomways ===
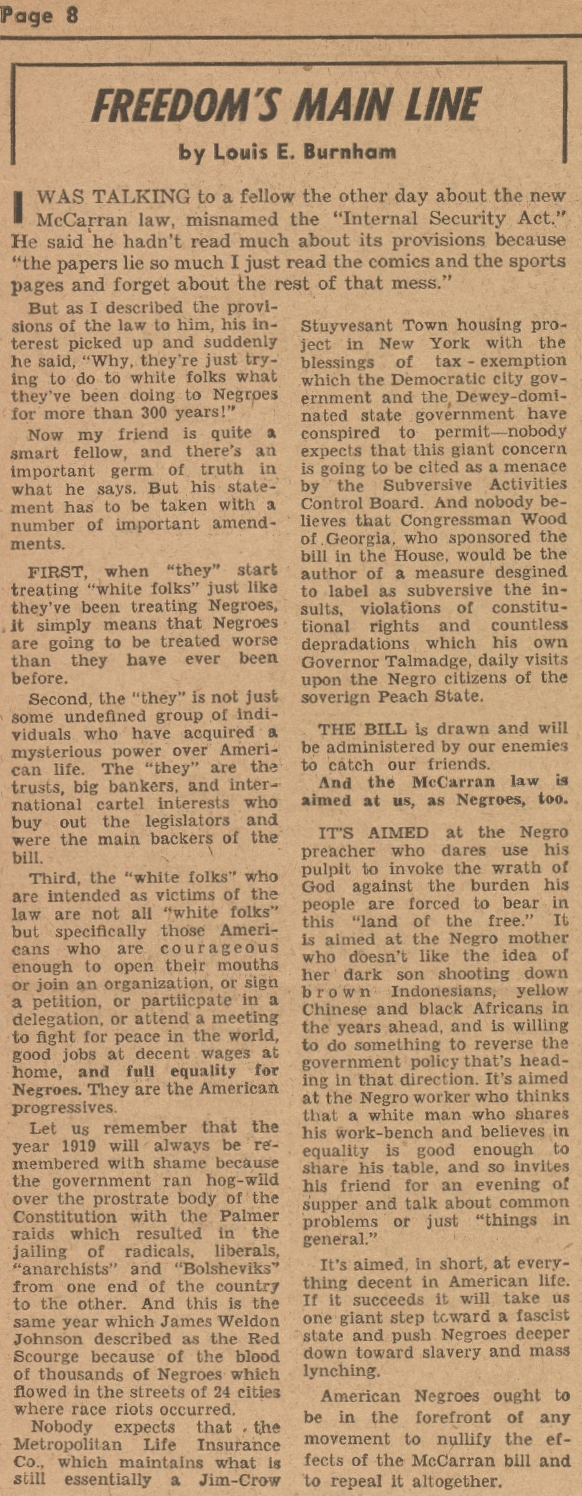
Louis Burnham's column in the first issue of Freedom

In Brooklyn, the small circle of African-American communists (and the White communist, Herbert Aptheker as well, with his daughter Bettina) mostly avoided speaking to their children about this party tie, but took these young children to meetings and rallies. During summers they were joined by Sallye Davis, another former SNYC leader, who would drive from her Birmingham home with her young daughter, the later activist Angela, to attend graduate school in New York. These children and their parents socialized with each other in their own homes and those of their fellow communists, including the intellectual luminary W. E. B. Du Bois. Having a small, closely-knit group in Birmingham, and which persisted during the Red Scare of the McCarthy period, created lasting bonds and valuable mutual support. Besides Angela Davis, other children from their group, including Burnham's own, grew up to become accomplished adults.

In 1950, Burnham helped bring to life a Paul Robeson project, the monthly newspaper Freedom, as its managing editor. He was responsible for getting the monthly started. According to Burnham's wife Dorothy, Burnham's intent was to publicize "the story of the people who were active in the movement and who were being persecuted during the McCarthy period." The newspaper ran monthly from November 1950 through August 1955, although it was bimonthly for the last two issues because it was running out of funds.

In its initial issue, Burnham wrote an article defending anyone "who is courageous enough to open their mouths, join an organization, sign a petition, or participate in a delegation or attend a meeting to fight for peace in the world, good jobs, decent wages at home, and full equality for Negroes. They are American progressives." An interview with the United Nations ambassador from the People's Republic of China, in the second issue, highlighted another focus of Burnham's in the pages of Freedom, the international anti-colonial struggle. He wrote: [emphasis in original] "the colored people everywhere are conducting their struggles for full human equality."

Burnham also assisted Robeson more directly, in support of Robeson's effort to get his passport restored, writing: "It is one of the shameful consequences of the Cold War that the American most honored abroad is most cruelly persecuted at home." He also prepared a collection of Robeson's songs and messages, for peace conferences in Europe, Asia and Africa.

The writer that Burnham hired who became the best known of Freedom's staff was Lorraine Hansberry, who eight years later won the New York Drama Critics Circle Award for Best Play. He hired her in 1951 when she was 20, shortly after her arrival in New York. At the newspaper, she worked initially, in her own words, "typing (eh?) receptionist and writer." Burnham nurtured her sense of herself as a writer, one of several who were published in the pages of his newspaper.

In 1951, Burnham, with numerous other prominent Black activists, writers and professionals, as well as families of the documented injured or murdered Black people, and White sympathizers, was one of the signers of We Charge Genocide: The Historic Petition to the United Nations for Relief From a Crime of the United States Government Against the Negro People.

Burnham's activities in 1951 also included organizing an event to honor the publication of the first volume of Aptheker's Documentary History of the Negro People.

From 1957 to 1960, Burnham wrote for the National Guardian as the associate editor for civil rights and national liberties. He reported from the South, Little Rock, Chicago, Detroit and Harlem, and wrote interpretive pieces upon his return from these forays. A friend of Burnham's from SNYC days, and later Brooklyn neighbor, James E. Jackson, reportedly described Burnham's method of gathering material in Little Rock in 1958, the year after nine Black students were escorted into segregated Little Rock Central High School by the 101st Airborne Division: "Burnham spent a lot of time speaking to people on lunch hours, on the job at the factories there. Talking to the Negro youth there and observing people on the street, sitting in barbershops he got reaction." Apparently skeptical of the likelihood of immediate racial progress, Burnham reportedly told Jackson that "there is an unprecedented, an almost swagger, of new confidence on the part of the Negroes. And part of that is compounded by naive effect [sic] that the government is on their side, the law is on their side, and the reactionaries, the Southerners have got to give in sooner or later and the time will be sooner."

During this period, in 1959, Burnham was elected to the National Committee of the CPUSA.

Near the end of his life, SNYC veterans Burnham, Esther Cooper Jackson, and Edward Strong, who had participated in its creation in 1937, conceived of a Black literary and political quarterly. Burnam and Strong worked for "two or three years" on this project. Burnham was to be the editor, but he had a heart attack and died on February 12, 1960, while he was giving a lecture on "Emerging Africa and the Negro People's Fight for Freedom" to young artists and writers for Negro History Week, at the Intercultural Society in midtown Manhattan. In this final speech, he said, "I know you get tired of the continuing struggle sometimes. We all do—and then there are reversals in situations—but we must not despair, we must not rest too long. Tomorrow's new world beckons. Tomorrow belongs to us." He was 44 years old.

Burnham was survived by his wife and four children, as well as his mother and brother. His obituary in The New York Times summarized his career: "more than twenty years a leader in the fight for Negro civil rights and the right to vote. He wrote and lectured widely before school and youth groups." Key figures in the anti-colonialism fight spoke at Burnham's April 28 memorial service, among them James Jackson, W. E. B. Du Bois, James Aronson and Alphaeus Hunton.

Du Bois helped organize fundraising "to ensure the upbringing and education" of Burnham's children, appealing in a circular letter "to the great numbers of people whose love and respect he had well earned." The National Guardian, which had published Burnham's last column on February 15, 1960, as "Not New Ground, But Rights Once Dearly Won," reprinted it a year after his death, as "Louis E. Burnham's last written work: The cry is still how long, O Lord, how long?" This reprint concluded with a note concerning the establishment of the Louis E. Burnham fund "to provide for the well-being of his family and the education of his four children."

Esther Cooper Jackson later described the impact of Burnham's death on the gestation of the planned journal: "After Louis died we were all in such shock that nothing happened for a while. Then Jim [James] Jackson, Shirley Graham Du Bois, Dr. Du Bois, John Oliver Killens, Ruby Dee, Ossie Davis, Lorraine Hansberry and some of us got together. Well we're going to try it out, because this was Louis Burnham's dream." This circle of activists and writers brought the idea of the new periodical to fruition: the quarterly journal Freedomways.

== Family ==
Burnham's wife, Dorothy Burnham, was already actively advocating for social justice at the time of their marriage, and has continued this throughout her life, making notable contributions to public education, civil rights, women's rights and the promotion of racial and economic equality.

Claudia Burnham was their oldest daughter. Their daughter Margaret Burnham is a law professor and racial justice activist, and a former judge in Massachusetts. Their daughter Linda Burnham is a journalist and women's rights activist, particularly regarding women of color. Their son Charles Burnham is a violinist.

== Publications ==
- Burnham, Lewis E. (1946). Smash the Chains. New York: American Youth for Democracy. OCLC 31686688 – via Internet Archive. Discusses racial discrimination in the South.
- Burnham, Louis E. (1955). Behind the lynching of Emmett Louis Till (PDF). New York: Freedom Associates. OCLC 1127513283 – via Civil Rights Movement Archive. Concerns oppressive conditions in the South: causes and remedies.
- Mulzac, Hugh (1972). A star to steer by. As told to Louis Burnham and Norval Welch. New York: International Publishers. ISBN 071780352X. OCLC 914896111. OL 5882786M. Memoir of a Black member of, and eventual ship captain in, the United States Merchant Marine, the first to command a fully integrated crew.

== See also ==
- Civil rights movement (1896–1954)
- Communist Party USA and African Americans
