= Henry O. Mayfield =

American miner and social activist

Henry O. Mayfield (February 15, 1907 – December 31, 1963) was an American miner and social activist. Mayfield was one of the Black miners who played an active role in forming the new Congress of Industrial Organizations (CIO) between 1935 and 1955; he also had a leadership role in the SNYC. He served the United States as a soldier in World War II; afterwards, he and other veterans worked to support voting rights. He worked with other Black leaders in the Congress of Industrial Organizations to advocate for the rights of laborers, especially in the southern United States. Mayfield was watched by the FBI and was arrested for his work in the Communist Party and advocacy for civil rights. Mayfield served as chairman of the board for Freedomways Associates, the publishing company for the cultural magazine Freedomways, up until his death.

== Biography ==
Henry O. Mayfield was born in 1907 in Florida. He received a primary education before migrating to the foundries, mills, and mines of Jefferson County, Alabama. Mayfield became a miner and worked for seven years in the largest foundry in Birmingham, the Stockholm Pipe and Fitting Company, and became a member of the United Mine Workers, one of the labor unions of the time. Due to joining the union, he became an active organizer of the Congress of Industrial Organizations (CIO) in the late 1930s. Working conditions led to a list of demands as part of a strike that included higher pay and changes in working hours. The groups that Mayfield targeted as part of the organizing drives were miners, churches, civic organizations, and voters' leagues. He was one of the black male leaders that tried to abstain from drinking, opposed having affairs and felt free to intervene in comrades' marital problems. Mayfield was a singer in the East Birmingham Stars quartet. He had two children in his first marriage. After he and his wife separated, her family "cut him up," so he fled to Greenwood to live with his mother. Mayfield joined the NAACP around 1938, with his friend and fellow member of the Communist Party, Hosea Hudson. He enlisted in the military in 1943, during World War II, at Fort Benning, Georgia, where he was a private. Following his work with the CIO and the SNYC, Mayfield transitioned to working as the chairman of the board for Freedomways Associates, a political and cultural journal written for African-American audiences. Mayfield died on December 31, 1963, at 56 years old. At the time of his death, Mayfield was living in Brooklyn, New York, and working on the Freedomways Journal.

== Communist Party ==
Henry O. Mayfield was recruited into the Communist Party (CPUSA) by Hosea Hudson, with whom he worked at the CIO, where his main goal was to attract black workers. To educate himself on Communist beliefs, including self-determination, he began by reading The Liberator with John Beidel, West Hibbard, Joe Howard, Charles DeBardelebel and Hudson. He was selected to go to Russia during his time with the party to attend a Communist training school. He was arrested in 1950 as a part of Birmingham's "Anti-Red Drive;" during the arrest, those working for the drive found Communist literature at his house. He became an active member of the party and, during the spring of 1932, was selected to be part of the Southern Section Committee; he also became a District 17 bureau member. His roles in both groups increased his political involvement. In 1938, he was chosen as a delegate to the national convention of the Communist Party in New York City.

Mayfield's involvement with the Party included helping to create CPUSA-led trade unions that allowed Black workers, which were a new development at the time. He also used his ties in the CIO to ask members to join initiatives he was heading at the Party, such as those for anti-poll tax campaigns, registering to vote; reading New South and Daily Worker, two Communist newspapers; and attending nonunion political functions headed by the Party. Another of Mayfield's roles in the Communist Party was delivering the Party's messages to prospective members in the South, which involved distributing leaflets with the Party's 15-point program. Hudson was adamant about Mayfield having this role because of his personality. The program's aims included confronting police brutality against people of color, ending poll taxes, federal housing, and voting rights for all citizens. As part of this last initiative, Mayfield and others founded the Right to Vote Club. This made procedural and legal information about voting accessible with less difficulty and helped communities that were being barred from voting, primarily the black community. This also marked the first time that the Communist Party created a program with the main focus of equal voting rights.

== Connections to other Black activists and FBI surveillance ==
Through his participation in the Communist Party, Mayfield collaborated with several other Black activists. Many of these organizers were active in the Congress of Industrial Organizations, which was created in 1935 to advocate for the rights of laborers, specifically in the southern United States. Among these leaders were Mayfield, Hosea Hudson, Andy Brown, and Ebb Cox. Ebb Cox worked with Mayfield in the fight for labor rights. Hudson and Mayfield met each other through a city relief work project. They were also associated due to their connections in the Congress of Industrial Organizations and the Southern Negro Youth Congress. Thus, Hudson's autobiography provides insight into his own life, the organizing of Black activists in the South, and Mayfield's life.

Mayfield, Hudson, Brown, and other Black activists, such as John Bedell and Sam Hall, were among those targeted by the FBI for their participation in the Communist Party. Mayfield and others had to leave their homes in Birmingham for personal safety due to the FBI's surveillance and harassment. Theophilus Eugene "Bull" Connor was a particular member of the FBI who targeted these Black activists, conducting raids against anyone he considered a "radical". The FBI attempted to mark Mayfield, Hudson, and others as criminals through methods that included spreading misinformation about Hudson being a murderer. Henry Mayfield and Sam Hall both lost homes that they were buying under GI loans due to FBI interference. They were with Hosea Hudson when he had to leave Birmingham because of Connor's surveillance and invasive raids. Henry Mayfield and other Black leaders were all targeted by law enforcement and the U.S. government for their perceived radicalism.

== Southern Negro Youth Congress ==
Henry Mayfield became more widely known as a leader in the movement for Black freedom and equality after his involvement in the founding convention for the Southern Negro Youth Congress (SNYC). The SNYC was the predecessor of the SNCC and was founded in 1937. The goal of the SNYC was to ensure freedom, equality, and opportunity for Black people in America, and it was particularly focused on the struggles of Black youth. The SNYC's first convention was located in Richmond, Virginia, and Mayfield acted as one of the founders in this convention, along with over 500 delegates from 23 states; 2,000 people observed the founding of the SNYC. When he started working for the SNYC, Mayfield was able to work on the planning committee with other black activists, including Hosea Hudson. Mayfield served as a chairman of the SNYC for some time. The SNYC was particularly known for its 4-point program, which espoused the values of citizenship, jobs, education, and health. The SNYC was able to attract the support of some white Southerners to support their cause. Their organizing also received endorsements from both the American Federation of Labor and the CIO.

== SNYC march on the Jefferson County Courthouse ==
After his recent service in World War 2, Mayfield became increasingly emboldened and helped organize a march on the Jefferson County Courthouse, with the help of the SNYC. Mayfield and the SNYC were able to gather over 100 black veterans, who all demanded their right to vote. Their protest was in response to the literacy tests and Jim Crow Laws that prevented them from being able to vote. Some Black men refused to join the march or watched from the sidelines, due to the threat of racially motivated violence from the Ku Klux Klan, as well as from the police.

== Union work ==
Mayfield advocated for changes in working conditions, especially in Birmingham, where he worked for the largest foundry in the city. For seven years, Mayfield worked for the Stockholm Pipe and Fitting company. While working in this foundry, Mayfield and other communist organizers, such as Hosea Hudson, influenced workplace organization and union creation in the Sloss Iron Company, U.S. Steel, and Republic Steel. Due to Mayfield's determination and knowledge regarding both his craft and organization, Mayfield and other Black communists were able to encourage workplace activism, which ultimately led to higher wages and safer working conditions. Due to their activism, these black organizers, including Mayfield, were able to come together with white workers and strengthen unions.

== 1941 strike ==
To have their demands for changes in working conditions and a higher wage met, Mayfield and other black workers went on strike in 1941. While working for the foundries in Birmingham, Mayfield stated that “The Negro workers were the main leaders in organizing unions in U.S. Steel, Republic Steel, and the Sloss Iron Company.” In Birmingham, black workers, led by Mayfield and other black organizers, were the first to come together to petition for changes in working conditions; white workers only joined the movement after finding out that Black workers would win in the Labor Board elections. Mayfield believed that “The Negro workers trained the white workers in the struggle.”

According to Mayfield, both the women and the children of the Black family played a role in union creation; when the men were on strike, the women could gather food for other families, while children could join protests with their fathers. This familial dynamic created a model that could unionize the foundries of Birmingham.

However, after their organizing and unionization in the foundries had succeeded, the Black organizers were forced out of their leadership roles by white workers, and support for their equality in the workplace was lost. Due to this, Mayfield stated that “Only small gains have been made, but only because the Negro fought for them.”
