= Dorothy Burnham =

American activist and educator (born 1915)

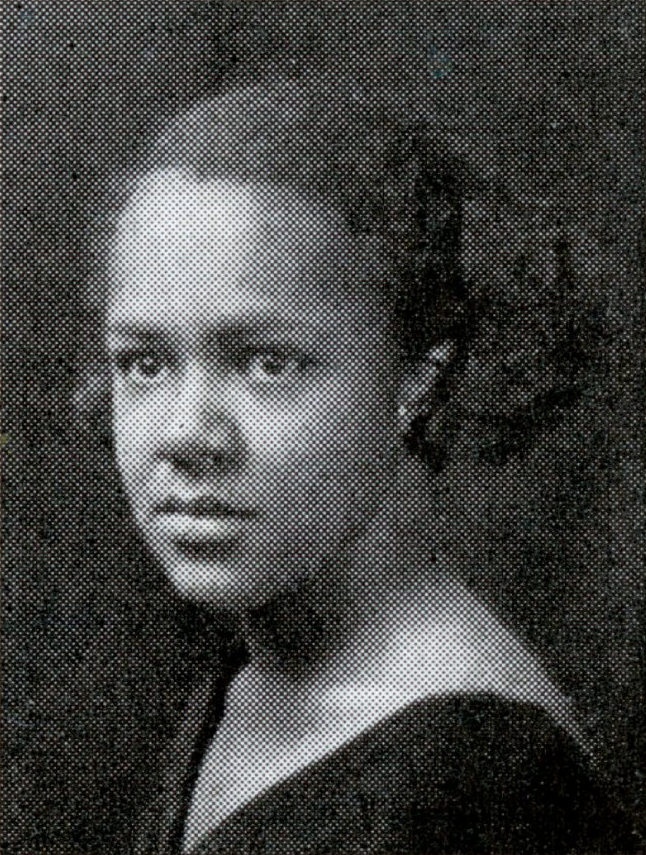
- Burnham's Brooklyn College yearbook photo, 1936
- Born: Dorothy Challenor; March 22, 1915 (age 111 years, 172 days); New York City, U.S.
- Education: Brooklyn College
- Occupations: Activist, educator
- Organization: Southern Negro Youth Congress
- Political party: Communist Party USA
- Spouse: Louis E. Burnham (m. 1941; died 1960)
- Children: 4, including Margaret, Linda, and Charles

Dorothy Burnham (née Challenor; born March 22, 1915) is an American civil rights activist, educator and supercentenarian. She is the widow of activist and journalist Louis E. Burnham.

== Early life and career ==
Burnham was born on March 22, 1915, in Brooklyn, to Barbadian immigrants Aletha Dowridge and Frederick Challenor. Her sister was Elise Challenor Rollock, one of New York's earliest black school principals. She attended Girls' High School, then Brooklyn College, from 1932 to 1936 or 1937, graduating with a bachelor's degree in microbiology. She planned to become a doctor, but practiced activism due to a lack of financial stability, which she was encouraged to do by Jessie Campbell, a professor of Burnham. While attending Brooklyn College, she was a member of the Southern Negro Youth Congress (SNYC), which is how she met Louis E. Burnham; they married in 1941 and moved to Birmingham, Alabama for SNYC activities. In 1936, she joined the Communist Party USA, with encouragement from Claudia Jones. As a member, she encouraged Mildred McAdory to join.

After her husband's death in 1960, Burnham was an active leader in the Sisters Against South African Apartheid, Genes and Gender, Women's International League for Peace and Freedom, and the national organization Women for Racial and Economic Equality. She served on the board of the cultural journal Freedomways and wrote for it.

As an educator, Burnham began working for Empire State University in 1977, later becoming Professor Emeritus. She taught at Hostos Community College and later taught biology and related subjects at City University of New York, as well as working at the Memorial Sloan Kettering Cancer Center. In 2023, SUNY Empire created the Dorothy Burnham scholarship, named for her.

== Personal life ==
With her husband, Louis, Burnham had four children: Claudia, Margaret, Linda, and Charles. Her 110th birthday was celebrated in the Loring–Greenough House. She is part of the New England Centenarian Study and is its oldest member. In her later years, she spent much time travelling, including annual summer vacations in Africa for many years. She owns a summer home on Martha's Vineyard.
