= Margaret Burnham =

American lawyer and academic (born 1944)

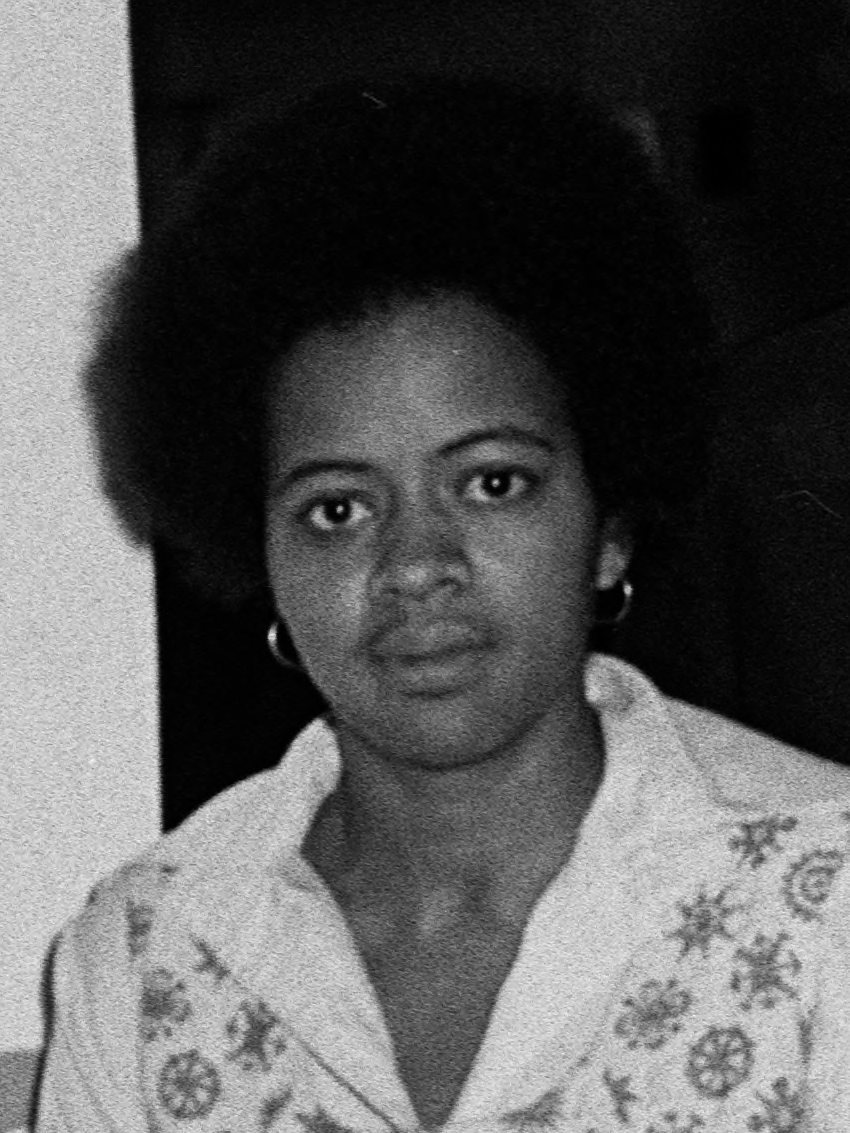
- Burnham in 1970

Member of the Civil Rights Cold Case Records Review Board
- Incumbent
- Assumed office April 5, 2022
- Nominated by: Joe Biden
- Preceded by: Position created

Personal details
- Born: December 28, 1944 (age 80) Birmingham, Alabama, U.S.
- Relations: Louis E. Burnham (father); Dorothy Burnham (mother); Linda Burnham (sister); Charles Burnham (brother)
- Education: Tougaloo College (BA); University of Pennsylvania (LLB)

Margaret A. Burnham (born December 28, 1944) is an American lawyer and academic. She is a University Distinguished Professor of Law at the Northeastern University School of Law, founder of the Civil Rights and Restorative Justice Project, and co-founder of the Burnham-Nobles Digital Archive. She is also the Faculty Co-Director for Northeastern Law's Center for Law, Equity and Race (CLEAR). She is a member of the Civil Rights Cold Case Records Review Board.

== Early life and education ==
Burnham was born in on December 28, 1944, in Birmingham, Alabama, to activists Louis E. Burnham and Dorothy Burnham (née Challenor). Her sister, Linda Burnham, is also an activist and journalist, and brother, Charles Burnham, is a violinist and composer. She is also related to Forbes Burnham, the second president of Guyana.

She earned a Bachelor of Arts degree in history from Tougaloo College and a Bachelor of Laws from the University of Pennsylvania Law School.

== Career ==
Burnham's legal practice included serving as an attorney with the NAACP Legal Defense Fund.

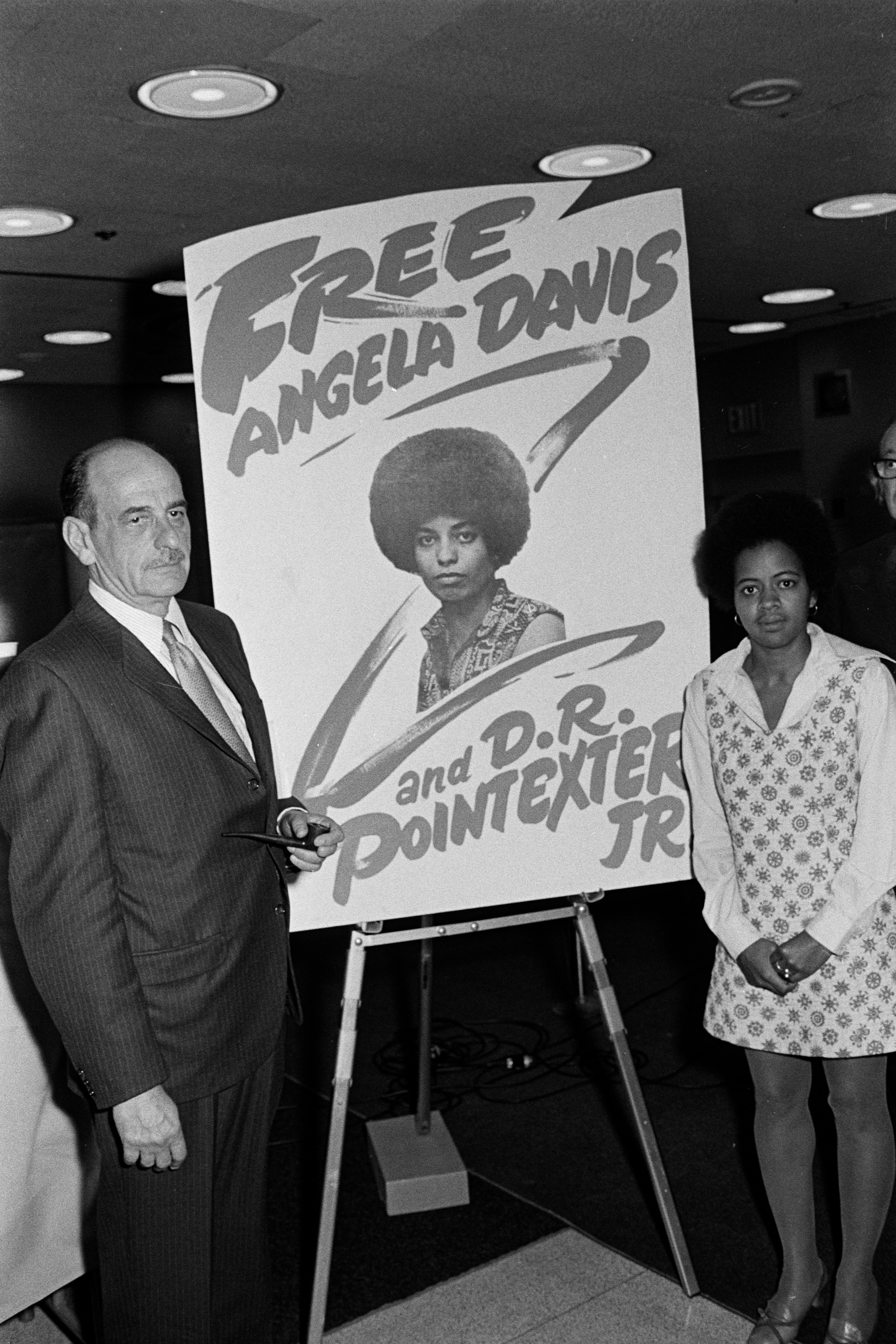
Burnham and Communist Party USA lawyer John Abt pose in front of a "Free Angela Davis" sign, October 16, 1970

In 1970, Burnham worked with Communist Party USA lawyer John Abt to defend Angela Davis, her friend since childhood, and later wrote the foreword to Abt's memoir.

In 1977, Burnham became the first African-American woman judge in Massachusetts, serving as an Associate Justice of the Boston Municipal Court until 1982.

In 2008, Burnham was one of the lawyers in a landmark federal lawsuit against Franklin County, Mississippi for their law-enforcement agents' involvement in the 1964 Ku Klux Klan kidnapping, torture and killing of two 19-year-olds, Henry Dee and Charles Eddie Moore.

On June 11, 2021, President Joe Biden nominated Burnham to be a member of the Civil Rights Cold Case Records Review Board. The Senate's Homeland Security committee held hearings on Burnham's nomination on January 13, 2022. The committee favorably reported her nomination on February 2, 2022. Burnham was officially confirmed by the entire Senate via voice vote on February 17, 2022.

Burnham has authored and coauthored numerous articles; and one book, By Hands Now Known: Jim Crow's Legal Executioners, which examines the history of racialized lethal violence during the Jim Crow era. Her book received positive reviews in The New York Times, The New York Review of Books, and won the Los Angeles Times Book Prize for History in 2022. It also won the 2023 Hillman Prize for Book Journalism, and The Hurston/Wright Legacy Award. By Hands Now Known was a finalist for the 2022 Kirkus Prize for Nonfiction, and has been named a Best Book of the Year by The New Yorker, Oprah Daily, Kirkus Reviews, Chicago Public Library, and Publishers Weekly.

== See also ==
- List of African-American jurists
- List of first women lawyers and judges in Massachusetts
