= Hosea Hudson =

Hosea Hudson (April 12, 1898 – 1988) was an African-American labor leader in the Southern United States.

Hudson was born in Wilkes County, Georgia. He worked as a sharecropper in what was then known as the "Black Belt" of Georgia. Then he moved to Birmingham and worked as a steel-mill worker and a local union official while maintaining an active membership in the Communist Party, which he joined after studying in New York City in the 1930s. Through his work, Hudson was often referred to as a militant fighter against racist oppression and economic exploitation. He is said to have been surprised at the abandonment of the Jim Crow Laws, but felt that was not enough.

Hudson actively participated in the struggle to enfranchise the African-American minority in the Deep South. In 1938, he organized the Right to Vote Club, which helped literate African Americans to register to vote despite the systematic intimidation of potential black voters in the segregated southern states. (Hudson himself had learned to read at the Communist Party's National Training School.)

During the Red Scares of the post-World War II period, Hudson was expelled from the Birmingham Industrial Union Council. In 1947, he was fired from his job, removed from his offices in Local 2815 (which he had founded), and blacklisted as a communist. His 30-year marriage to Lucy Goosby ended in 1946.

Hudson told his own story in his book Black Worker in the Deep South: A Personal Record (1972). It has been published in various editions, usually by small, progressive publishers.

In 1987, the historian Nell Irvin Painter co-authored a book about Hosea Hudson's life, often described as a collaborative autobiography. His story is also featured in a collection of stories about the Civil Rights Movement, as well as one on the communist movement in the United States.

== Activities with the Communist Party ==
The Communist Party drew Hudson's attention after the conviction of the Scottsboro Boys and the attack on sharecroppers in Camp Hill. One day, in September 1931, he was invited to a Party meeting by an old co-worker, Al Murphy of the Sharecroppers' Union. On September 8, 1931, Hudson attended his first Communist Party meeting. There were only about seven other people at the meeting, all from Stockham Pipe and Fittings or the surrounding community. Given that Hudson did not know much about the Party before his first meeting, he questioned whether or not he "could fit in." However, he came to realize that none of the other attendees could read or write. During that first meeting, the points Murphy made convinced the eight men to sign up for the Communist Party and form a unit for Stockham workers. The new members elected Hudson to be the unit organizer.

After a few months of organizing, Hudson's Party unit, despite the organizers' inexperience, "became a training school for men who later helped to make great labor history in Alabama." Since Hudson's unit was having success with Party organizing, stool pigeons became an issue at Stockham. To protect members from stool pigeons, leaders of the Party set up six separate groups. Hudson was the "organizer of Unit 1, which was responsible for Unit Numbers 2, 3, 4, 5, and 6." A person stooled (he was only a member, not a leader) on Unit 1, and since members knew nothing of other units, the stool pigeon only damaged Unit 1.

One Tuesday morning, the personnel manager pulled Hudson aside and told him he had to leave his company house. Hudson moved out the following Saturday. The Monday after, the assistant superintendent informed Hudson that he was fired, seemingly because of his Party work (the assistant superintendent asked Hudson about "what [he's] in" before firing him). A few days later, someone told Hudson to reach out to a Party organizer from New York. With that organizer's help, Hudson, his unit, and the five other unit leaders distributed leaflets that exposed the names and personal/professional information of the six Stockham stool pigeons all around town.

Many months later, while working a Welfare job, Hudson and his friend Bedell, who was also on Welfare, encouraged Hudson to get the Party unit back together. (After Hudson was fired, "the rest of [the] Party unit got scared and quit.") When they successfully got the unit back together, the group "began to read again and understand more about the Party and the history of the working class."

Years later in Birmingham, during November 1933, Hudson and other Party members organized a meeting to work towards Union rights for Black industrial workers. At the meeting, when only nine organizers were present, police arrested eight of them. The city kept Hudson and another organizer in jail from Sunday night to Tuesday, the day of their trial. The judge charged them with holding a Party "meeting to overthrow the government." Hudson pleaded not guilty. The two organizers were then placed back in a cell and then sent home the following afternoon.

== Struggle for voting rights ==
In May 1944, Hudson, as a member of the Labour and Industrial Committee, attended a conference to discuss Black voting rights. As a result of this meeting, the Negro Democratic Non-Partisan Voters League was formed and decided that Black people needed to work within their communities for the right to vote. Then, on a Sunday in Birmingham, the Committee of Industrial Union (CIO) met with two potential candidates, but neglected to invite the only two Black men in the organization. Therefore, at the next meeting, Hudson announced that he would not encourage the Black members of his local union, which was about 590 members, to vote for their candidate.

While encouraging those in his community to vote, he began to influence veterans, especially those who fought against Hitler. It was during this time that Hudson started to build momentum. The Federal Bureau of Investigation noticed that Hudson was receiving attention and the FBI began to feel threatened. Due to this, the FBI launched investigations on the leaders of Hudson's platform and labeled them as dangerous. The FBI investigation influenced the Ku Klux Klan to launch attacks on Black communities that supported Black youth. The attacks did not stop with the terrorist group. Attacks would also come from leaders in politics. Said political leaders include the Director of CIO, the CIO state president, and the District Director of Steel Union.

== Organizations and employment ==
Hosea Hudson was involved with many organizations and unions, and held several different jobs from the 1930s to the 1950s. In 1933, he organized mass meetings of the unemployed in Birmingham, Alabama. The goal of these gatherings was to draw attention to the use of unskilled workers to carry out skilled labor, specifically road construction, without appropriate wages. A few years later, he was heavily involved in a trade-union at the Wallwork Foundry of the Tennessee Coal and Railroad Company. Unions were not allowed by the Wallwork Foundry, so the Steel Workers Union allowed him to become a member of a shop at another plant. From 1937 to 1938, he worked as the recording secretary of the Steel Workers Local 1489. Hudson was then elected a delegate to the second Southern Negro Youth Congress Convention in 1938, resulting in the loss of his job upon relocation to Birmingham, Alabama. There, he served on the planning committee with Henry O. Mayfield.

In the summer of 1938, an unemployed Hudson began collaborating with fellow Communist Party member Joe Gelders to form a club to encourage people to register to vote. The two worked to form a committee that went on to create the Right To Vote Club. One of the issues the group was trying to combat was the intentionally confusing and needlessly complicated steps necessary to appeal voter registration for Black Americans as opposed to White Americans.

The club gained considerable acknowledgement from several organizations over the course of the next year. Members from the NAACP began attending and speaking at meetings. Eventually, the president of the Negro Democratic Voters Club approached Hudson to attempt to have the Right To Vote Club become affiliated with their organization. However, Hudson brought the idea to the attention of other members of the club and it was decided against.

Later in 1938, Hudson began relief work for the Works Progress Administration. He was able to earn a living during this time by servicing roads in Birmingham, Alabama. Through connections made from his work for the WPA, Hudson attended a meeting for the Local I Workers Alliance Union in September of that year. During the meeting, the union began electing executive positions, and Hudson was elected to be the vice president. As vice president, Hudson discussed issues regarding workers’ projects and relief aid with the head of the WPA at a conference in Washington, D.C. in 1939.

In 1942, Hudson began working in the Jackson Foundry (Flakley Foundry Co.) where he organized Local 2815, United Steel Workers of America, CIO. During this time, he was also a member of the Birmingham Industrial Union Council and named one of Birmingham World newspaper’s “Men of the Year” in response to his role at the Alabama CIO convention supporting voting rights for Black Alabamians. At the Industrial Union Council meetings, he advocated for the election of Black delegates to the state Industrial Union Council, condemned discrimination, and addressed the 1945 lynching of two Black veterans. In 1944, he became chairman of the Labor and Industrial Committee at a voting rights conference in New Orleans, Louisiana organized by Rev. Maynard Jackson. He formed an Alabama Black voting rights organization upon his return.

Hudson remained an active member of the Communist Party throughout his involvement in other organizations and was nominated to the National Committee of the Communist Party in July 1945, receiving more votes than any other candidate. He acted as the national representative of the South and organized the Party in Alabama and Louisiana. The Birmingham Post identified him as a member of the Communist Party in October 1947, causing him to lose his job at the Jackson Foundry and to be discharged from the union. Afterwards, he found various plant jobs in the North including work as a mason and a janitor while continuing to work as an underground party organizer in the South.

== Other activities ==
In 1933 Hudson and three other Welfare workers gathered 400 men and women to discuss the payment for doing Welfare jobs. The group decided they must see the Birmingham city commissioner and demand that the government pay Welfare workers in money, not grocery slips. One hundred and fifty people marched to City Hall and planned to send six spokespersons (five men and one woman) to speak to Commissioner Jones. Two city detectives asked the group where they were going. They responded that they were on their way to see Commissioner Jones, and one of the detectives pulled out a pistol and forced five of them out of the building (of the six delegates, one was white; he was allowed through). Days later, the workers sent a committee of nine to the Commissioner's office, but nothing came of that meeting except for a few concessions.

In March 1946, 150 people from Alabama representing 26 World War II Veteran groups came together in a convention and created the Alabama Veterans Association. At the convention, they "voted to characterize the Gillem [Board] report as 'Too little and too late,'" and discussed issues such as "the need for greater hospital, health and recreational facilities, low-cost price-controlled housing, state and federal FEPC laws; abolition of the poll tax and anti-lynching legislation." Hosea Hudson was one of the experts who led these discussions. He was the president of Local Union 2815 of the United Steelworkers of America at the time.

== Written works ==
- Black Worker in the Deep South: A Personal Record. New York: International Publishers, 1972.

As co-author (with Nell Irvin Painter):

- The Narrative of Hosea Hudson: The Life and Times of a Black Radical. New York: W.W. Norton, 1994.
