= Linda Burnham =

American journalist, activist, and leader in women's rights movements

- Born: 1948 (age 77–78)
- Education: Reed College
- Occupations: Journalist; activist
- Parents: Louis E. Burnham (father); Dorothy Burnham (mother)

Linda Burnham (born 1948) is an American journalist, activist, and leader in women's rights movements, particularly with organizations serving and advocating for women of color.

== Early life and family ==
Burnham was born in 1948, to Louis E. Burnham and Dorothy Burnham; both were civil rights activists who were active in the Young Communist League USA and then the Southern Negro Youth Congress, in the 1930s and 1940s. Burnham grew up in Brooklyn, New York, and graduated from Reed College in 1968.

== Career ==
As a journalist and political activist, Burnham has been a leader and member of the Venceremos Brigade, the Third World Women's Alliance, the Alliance Against Women's Oppression, the Angela Davis Defense Committee, and the Line of March.

She co-founded the Women of Color Resource Center in Oakland, California in 1990 and served as its executive director for eighteen years. Burnham is the former National Research Director and senior adviser for the National Domestic Workers Alliance.

Burnham led women of color delegations to the 1985 UN World Conference on Women in Nairobi, the 1995 UN World Conference on Women in Beijing, and the 2001 United Nations World Conference Against Racism in Durban.

Burnham is featured in the 2014 feminist history film She's Beautiful When She's Angry.

== Awards ==
She was nominated in 2005 as one of the 1000 PeaceWomen for the Nobel Peace Prize and was the 2007–8 Twink Frey Visiting Social Activist at the Center for the Education of Women, University of Michigan.

== Selected publications ==
- Burnham, Linda; & Wing, Bob (1981). Toward a communist analysis of Black oppression and Black liberation.
- Burnham, Linda (March 1985). "Has Poverty Been Feminized in Black America?". The Black Scholar, vol. 16, no. 2.
- Burnham, Linda; & Gustafson, Kaaryn (2000). Working hard, staying poor: Women and children in the wake of welfare "reform". Berkeley, CA: Women of Color Resource Center.
- Burnham, Linda (January 2001). "Welfare reform, family hardship, and women of color". Annals of the American Academy of Political and Social Science, vol. 577.
- Burnham, Linda (2001). The wellspring of Black feminist theory. Oakland, CA: Women of Color Resource Center.
- Burnham, Linda (2002). Racism in U.S. welfare policy: A human rights issue. Oakland, CA: Women of Color Resource Center.
- Burnham, Linda (December 2008). "Obama's Candidacy: The Advent of Post-Racial America and the End of Black Politics?". The Black Scholar, vol. 38, no. 4.
- Burnham, Linda; Theodore, Nik; & Ehrenreich, Barbara (2012). Home economics: The invisible and unregulated world of domestic work. New York: National Domestic Workers Alliance.
- Burnham, Linda (March 26, 2013). "Lean In and One Percent Feminism". Portside.
- Burnham, Linda (April 8, 2013). "1% Feminism". openDemocracy.
