= Esther Georgia Irving Cooper =

American civil rights activist (1881–1970)

Esther Georgia Irving Cooper (November 28, 1881 – February 7, 1970) was an American civil rights leader.

== Early and personal life ==
Cooper was born on November 28, 1881, in Cleveland, to William and Katherine Harris Irving, formerly enslaved people. She moved to Virginia to be part of the Forest Service and worked as a stenographer. She married George Posea Cooper on September 10, 1913, and they had three daughters. One daughter, Esther Cooper Jackson was a civil rights activist who married fellow civil rights activist James E. Jackson. She died on February 7, 1970, aged 88.

== Career ==
Cooper worked part-time teaching English, typing and shorthand at the National Training School for Women and Girls and managed business classes in the adult education programs at the Arlington County Public Schools as part of the Federal Education Rehabilitation Act. When Cooper moved to Arlington, Virginia, she found the segregated schools to be inadequate and sent her daughters to school in Washington D.C. like many other parents of the time.

Cooper founded and was the first president of the Arlington County branch of the National Association for the Advancement of Colored People. In 1942, she joined the executive board of the Virginia State Conference of the NAACP which challenged racial inequalities in the county's high schools. This culminated in Carter v. School Board of Arlington County, in which the Fourth Circuit Court of Appeals ruled that the county's separate high schools constituted unlawful racial discrimination and mandated increased funding for segregated schools as well as equal pay for black teachers.

Cooper was NAACP branch president during the 1940s as well as a member of the Southern Conference for Human Welfare where she was president of the SCHW's Arlington chapter. Cooper helped organize the Jennie Dean Community Center Association, group that raised money to buy land for a recreation center open to black people. As the secretary of the Butler Holmes Citizens Association, She registered voters and campaigned to end voting poll taxes. She worked on political campaigns and at polling places through the 1964 presidential election.
