= Clayborne Carson =

American historian (born 1944)

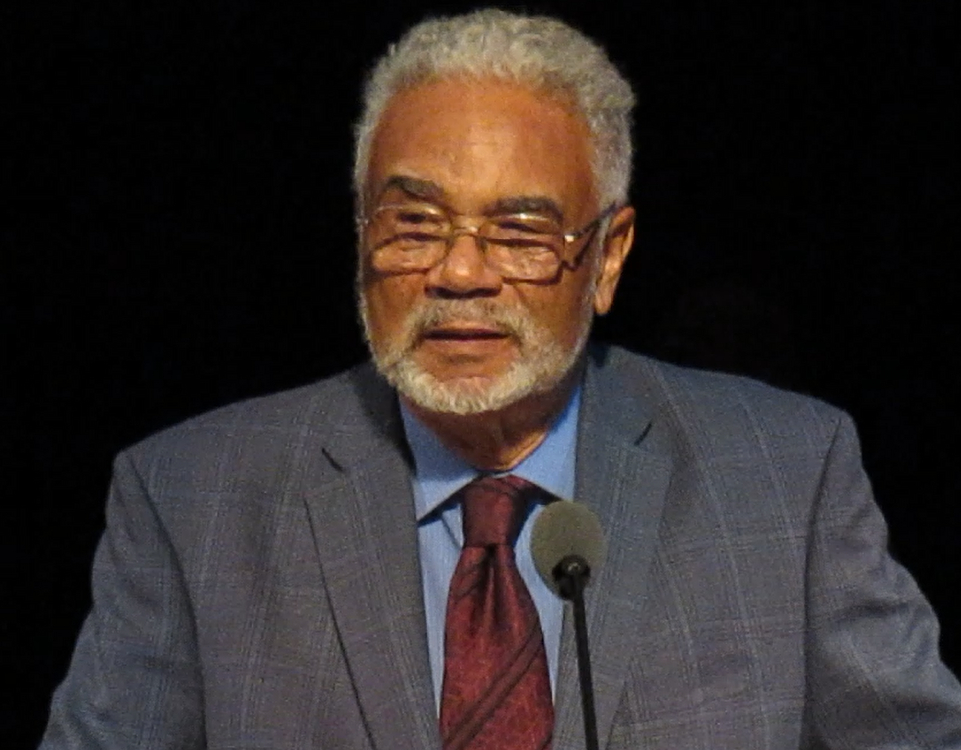
- Carson in 2017
- Born: June 15, 1944 (age 82); Buffalo, New York, U.S.
- Spouse: Susan Ann Carson
- Children: 2

Academic background
- Education: University of California, Los Angeles (BA, MA, PhD)

Academic work
- Era: 20th century
- Institutions: Stanford University
- Main interests: Civil Rights Movement; Martin Luther King Jr.

Clayborne Carson (born June 15, 1944) is an acclaimed American history academic, educator, scholar, and author, a preeminent human rights expert historian, and an MLK Jr. Centennial Professor Emeritus at Stanford University as well as the founder of Stanford's Dr. Martin Luther King, Jr. Research and Education Institute. Since 1985, at the request of Coretta Scott King, Carson has directed the Dr. Martin Luther King, Jr. Papers Project, a long-term effort to edit and publish the papers of Martin Luther King Jr.

== Early life and education ==
Carson was born on June 15, 1944, in Buffalo, New York; son of Clayborne and Louise Carson. He grew up near Los Alamos, New Mexico, where his father was a security guard for the Los Alamos National Laboratory. His was one of a very small number of African-American families in Los Alamos, and he attributes his lifelong interest in the Civil Rights Movement to that experience. "I had this really strong curiosity about the black world, because in Los Alamos the black world was a very few families. When the civil rights movement started, I had this real fascination with it, and I wanted to meet the people in it."

After graduating from Los Alamos High School in 1962, Carson attended the University of New Mexico for his first year on college during the 1962–1963 school year. At age 19, Carson met Stokely Carmichael at a national student conference in Indiana. Carmichael convinced him to attend the March on Washington For Jobs and Freedom as a member of the Student Nonviolent Coordinating Committee (SNCC, pronounced "snick"). On August 28, 1963, Carson was overwhelmed to find himself among hundreds of thousands of African Americans at the March. This was the first big thing Carson had done in contribution to the Civil Rights Movement. Recalling the March, at which Dr. Martin Luther King Jr. delivered his famous "I Have a Dream" speech at the Lincoln Memorial, Carson says, "I have a lot of vivid memories, but not of King's speech." What left the biggest impression, he says, were "the people I met there." The March was also the only time Carson had ever heard Dr. King speak in public.

It wasn't until 1964 after Carson had transferred to the University of California, Los Angeles (UCLA) that he became more active in what he calls the "northern version of the southern struggle", and continued with SNCC. At UCLA Carson Changed his field of study from computer programming to American History. Here he earned his B.A. (1967), M.A. (1971), and wrote his doctoral dissertation on Stokely Carmichael and SNCC which earned him his Ph.D. (1975). While studying at UCLA, he was also involved with anti-Vietnam War protests. He speaks of that experience in his current writing, highlighting the importance of grassroots political activity within the African-American freedom struggle.

== Career ==
Carson was a professor at Stanford University for more than 40 years, where he primarily taught U.S. history and African American history. He teaches and lectures about Martin Luther King, Malcolm X, the Student Nonviolent Coordinating Committee (SNCC), the Black Panther Party, and other subjects related to the black struggle and civil rights. He has been a frequent guest on Pacifica Radio station KPFA in Berkeley, California, and has also appeared on programs like NPR's Fresh Air, the Tavis Smiley Show, the Charlie Rose Show, Good Morning America, and the CBS Evening News.

Carson has also written several books and articles regarding the Civil Rights Movement, and has made contributions to many more as well as documentaries, and interviews. His first book In Struggle: SNCC and the Black Awakening of the 1960s was awarded the Fredrick Jackson Turner Award in 1982. Carson was also the Historical Adviser for the film Freedom on My Mind, which in 1995 was nominated for an Oscar.

In 1985, Coretta Scott King asked Carson to lead a project to publish King's previously unpublished works. In an interview conducted in 2008, Carson explains that he initially declined to work as senior editor to Dr. King's works, Carson had "never really thought of [himself] as a King biographer. [He] was a SNCC person," he said, referencing the discord between SNCC and Dr. King that occurred during the movement. Carson eventually agreed to oversee the project mentioning that he would not have accepted the job if the family held control over Dr. King's works. Carson and his staff have spent over 20 years working to edit and publish Dr. King's works.

Carson retired from Stanford in 2020.

In 2021, Carson was nominated by President Joe Biden to serve as a member of the newly formed Civil Rights Cold Case Records Review Board.

== Personal life ==
In 1967, Carson married Susan Ann Beyer, who at the time was a librarian. Until her retirement, she was the managing editor of the King Papers Project, and lives in Palo Alto, California. He has a daughter and son.

== Awards and achievements ==
- Andrew Mellon Fellowship (1977)
- Frederick Jackson Turner Award of the Organization of American Historians for In Struggle:SNCC and the Black Awakening of the 1960s (1982)
- Society of American Historians; elected member (1991)
- Honorary Doctorate from Pacific Graduate School of Psychology (1995)
- International design competition for the National Martin Luther King Jr. Memorial in Washington D.C; winning team member (2000)
- Gandhi King Ikeda Award from Martin Luther King, Jr. International Chapel, Gandhi Institute for reconciliation, Morehouse College, Atlanta (2004)
- Honorary Doctorate from Morehouse College (2007)
- Honorary Doctorate from Niagara University (2008)
- Honorary Doctorate from Westminster College (2015)

== Select bibliography ==
- Carson, Clayborne (1981). In struggle : SNCC and the Black Awakening of the 1960s. Harvard University Press. ISBN 9780674447264.
- Senior Academic Adviser, "Eyes on the Prize". PBS,1987-1990.
- Co-editor with David Gallen, Malcolm X: The FBI file. Carroll & Graf Publishers, 1991. ISBN 978-0-88184-758-1
- Co-editor, The Eyes on the Prize Civil Rights Reader. Penguin Books, 1991. ISBN 0-14-015403-5
- Co-author with Carol Berkin and others, American Voices A History of the United States. Scott Foresman and Company, 1992. ISBN 0673352579
- Author of play Passages of Martin Luther King. 1993
- Historical Adviser, "Freedom on My Mind", Tara Releasing, 1994.
- Historical Adviser, "Chicano! History of Mexican American Civil Rights", NLCC Educational Media, 1996.
- Historical Adviser, "Blacks and Jews", 1997.
- Co-author, A Knock at Midnight: Inspiration from the Great Sermons of Reverend Martin Luther King, Jr. Grand Central Publishers, 1998. ISBN 978-0-446-52346-2
- Co-author, "Blacks and Jews in the Civil Rights Movement," in Strangers and Neighbors: Relations between Blacks and Jews in the United States, University of Massachusetts Press, 2000. ISBN 978-1-55849-236-3
- Co-author, The Autobiography of Martin Luther King, Jr. Grand Central Publishers, 2001. ISBN 978-0-446-67650-2
- Co-editor with Kris Shepard, A Call to Conscience: The Landmark Speeches of Dr. Martin Luther King, Jr. Warner Books, Inc., 2001. ISBN 0-446-52399-2
- Consultant, Civil Rights Chronicle : the African-American Struggle for Freedom, Publications International, Ltd., 2003. ISBN 978-0-785-34924-2
- Co-editor, African American Lives: The Struggle for Freedom. Volume I. Longman, 2004. ISBN 978-0-201-79487-8
- Co-editor, African American Lives: The Struggle for Freedom. Volume II. Longman, 2004. ISBN 978-0-201-79489-2
- Senior editor, The Papers of Martin Luther King, Jr. Vols. 1–4. University of California Press, 1992–2007.
- Co-author, The Martin Luther King, Jr. Encyclopedia. Greenwood Press, 2008. ISBN 978-0-313-29440-2
- Co-Author, This Light is Ours: Activist Photographs of the Civil Rights Movement. WW Norton & Co, 2009. ISBN 0393306046
- Author of introduction, Stride Toward Freedom: Montgomery Story. Beacon Press, 2010. ISBN 0807000698
- Martin's Dream: My Journey and the Legacy of Martin Luther King Jr. A Memoir. Palgrave MacMillan, 2013. ISBN 978-0-230-62169-5
- Carson, Clayborne (2015). "Prologue. Martin's dream : the global legacy of Martin Luther King Jr" (PDF). Bulletin of the German Historical Institute (Washington DC). Supplement 11: 15–21. Archived from the original (PDF) on September 12, 2015.
