= Civil Rights Cold Case Records Review Board =

Independent agency overview
- Formed: 2019
- Jurisdiction: Government of the United States
- Annual budget: $1m USD (2021)

The Civil Rights Cold Case Records Review Board is an independent agency tasked with reviewing and authorizing for public release investigative records concerning unsolved and unresolved civil rights violations that occurred between 1940 and 1979. Established in 2019, the board is authorized for up to 7 years, and authorization may be extended for an additional year by board vote.

== History ==
The board was established upon the passing of the Civil Rights Cold Case Records Collection Act of 2018, which was signed into law by President Donald Trump in January 2019. The act was originally drafted by students at Hightstown High School in New Jersey with an early version introduced by Rep. Bobby Rush from Chicago. After additional outreach and lobbying efforts by other cohorts of Highstown High School students, senators Ted Cruz and Doug Jones introduced and sponsored the Senate version, which ultimately became law. After the bill was signed, the board was not staffed until February 2022, when a slate of board members nominated by President Joe Biden was confirmed by the U.S. Senate.

While the board was originally authorized for up to 4 years, due to the 3-year gap between the formation of the board and the confirmation of its first slate of members, government observers warned that the board would not have enough time to carry out its intended function. To address this, senators Jon Ossoff and Ted Cruz submitted a bill in February 2022 to extend the board's mandate through 2027; the bill was signed into law in December 2022 by President Joe Biden.

== Releasing documents ==
In December 2024, the Civil Rights Cold Case Records Review Board released a set of records from three historical cold cases, reinforcing its mission to pursue justice through historical clarity. This release included detailed case files, annual reports, and legislative updates. Notably, the case of Hattie DeBardelaben was among the first published.

The official Civil Rights Cold Case Records Portal, hosted by the National Archives, offers searchable, digitized records that allow the public to explore primary documents and understand specific case details. The portal includes an overview of available cases, keyword and advanced search options, a glossary, and additional resources.

According to the Civil Rights Cold Case Records Act, the board holds the authority to withhold specific information if its release could pose harm to individuals or national security. However, the board maintains ethical oversight by routinely re-evaluating previously withheld records, as the potential for harm may diminish over time. The public can place trust in the board's discretion, as its members are trained and highly educated in civil rights history.

In March 2024, recruitment efforts were made to fill remaining vacancies on the board, further ensuring transparency and historical accuracy in the document review process. The legislative framework for this process is outlined in the Civil Rights Cold Case Records Collection Act, available through Congress.gov and the National Archives. Media outlets such as Axios and WABE have emphasized the public importance of unsealing these records to promote justice and historical transparency.

== Membership ==
In June 2021, Clayborne Carson, Gabrielle Dudley, Hank Klibanoff, and Margaret Burnham became the first nominees to the board. In October 2021, Brenda Elaine Stevenson was also nominated to serve on the board. Carson's nomination was withdrawn by the White House on January 7, 2022.

Dudley, Klibanoff, Burnham, and Stevenson were all confirmed via voice vote on February 17, 2022. There is one open seat on the board.

Name	Position	Assumed office
Gabrielle Dudley	Member	February 17, 2022
Hank Klibanoff	Member	February 17, 2022
Margaret Burnham	Member	February 17, 2022
Brenda Elaine Stevenson	Member	February 17, 2022
TBA	Member	—
