= Women of Color Resource Center =

The Women of Color Resource Center was founded in 1990 by Linda Burnham and Miriam Ching Yoon Louie, who met at U.N. World Conference on Women in Nairobi, Kenya in 1985. They were joined at the WCRC by Caroline Guilartes, Jung Hee Choi, Angela Davis, Derethia DuVal, Chris Lymbertos, Genevieve Negron-Gonzales, Margo Okazawa-Rey and Cindy Wiesner. Burnham served as its Executive Director for 18 years. It includes five objectives: Women's Human Rights, Popular Education, Welfare, Peace and Justice, and Sisters of Fire.

Linda Burnham served as executive director from 1990 until December 2007, at which point Anisha Desai succeeded her. On February 26, 2010, the Women of Color Resource Center ceased operations.

== See also ==
- Social justice feminism
