= Jack O'Dell =

American activist (1923–2019)

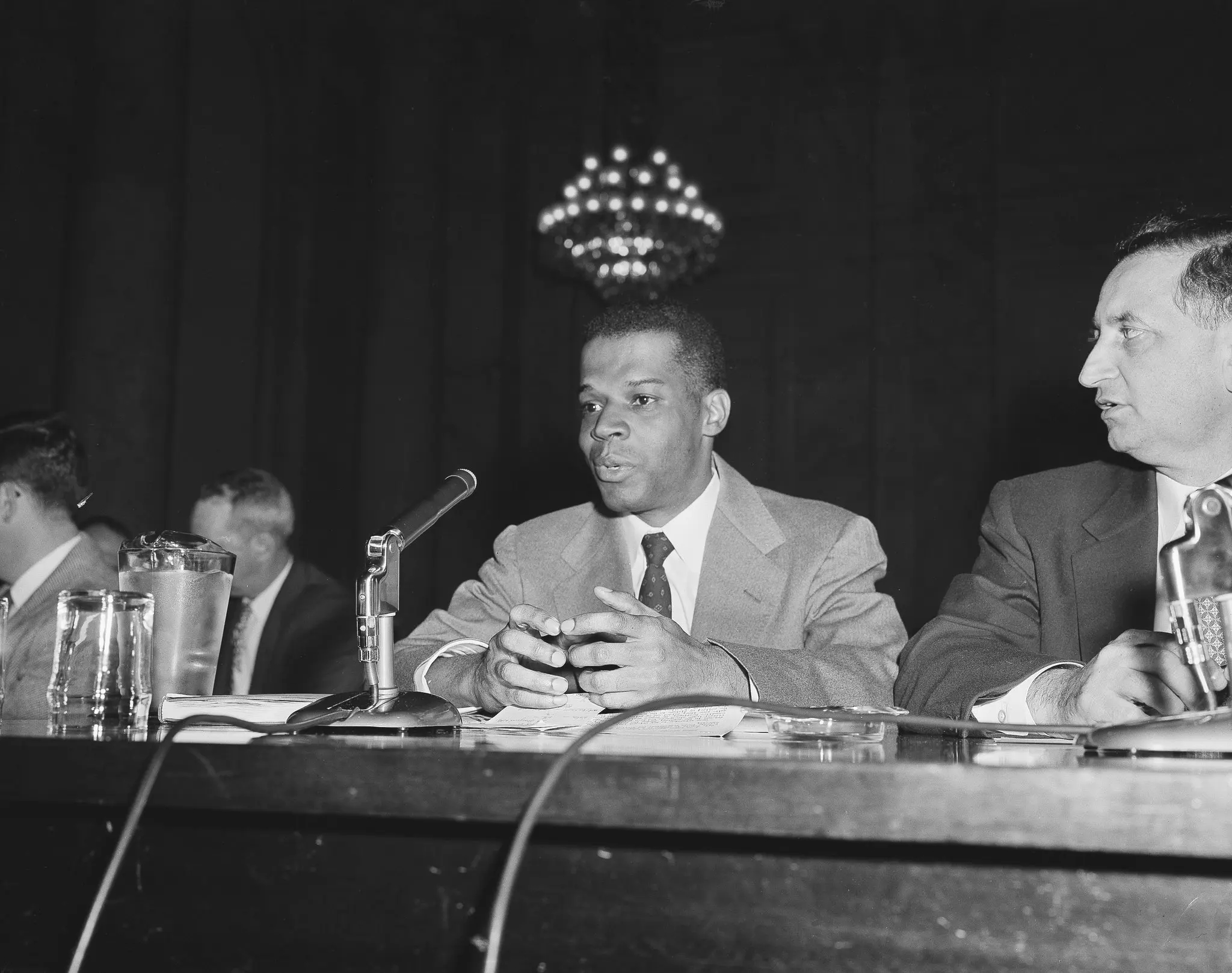
- O'Dell in 1956
- Born: Hunter Pitts O'Dell; August 11, 1923; Detroit, Michigan, U.S.
- Died: October 31, 2019 (aged 96)
- Education: Xavier University of Louisiana; New York University School of Management
- Occupations: Activist, writer, organiser for the National Maritime Union
- Known for: Involved in the Civil rights movement
- Parent(s): George Edwin O'Dell; Emily (Pitts) O'Dell

Jack O'Dell (born Hunter Pitts O'Dell, August 11, 1923 – October 31, 2019) was an African-American activist and writer, best known for his role in the civil rights movement of the 1950s and 1960s. During World War II, he was an organizer for the National Maritime Union. He worked for over twenty years on the Freedomways journal, both as editor and contributor. In 1963, he was forced out of the Southern Christian Leadership Conference (SCLC) by Martin Luther King Jr. after pressure was brought to bear due to O'Dell's prior membership in the Communist Party USA.

== Early life ==
Hunter "Jack" Pitts O'Dell was born in Detroit, Michigan, on August 11, 1923. As a result of his parents' divorce, he was raised by his grandfather, John O'Dell, a janitor at a public library, and his grandmother, Georgianna O'Dell. His father, George Edwin O'Dell, worked in hotels and restaurants in Detroit. O'Dell's mother, Emily (Pitts) O'Dell, had studied music at Howard University and gave piano lessons. Growing up, Jack witnessed racial violence, labor strikes, and social injustice, which would influence his subsequent involvement in union struggles and social reform.

O'Dell attended an all-black college, Xavier University of Louisiana in New Orleans, from 1941 until 1943. He studied pharmacology but left to enlist in the U.S. Marines. During World War II, he served in the U.S. Merchant Marines, which functioned as a branch of the military forces for the duration of the conflict. He was an organizer for the National Maritime Union (NMU), one of the few racially integrated labor unions in the United States.

After returning from the war, O'Dell signed up with Operation Dixie, which attempted to unionize Southern workers. He moved to the South and quickly showed his mediation skills when he defused a volatile situation in a Miami grocery store; it earned him a "Citizen of the Year" award from Miami's African-American Press. During the 1948 presidential campaign, he led a group of WWII veterans supporting Progressive Party candidate Henry A. Wallace, who advocated for civil rights and labor rights, and opposed Cold War militarism. O'Dell did graduate work at New York University's School of Management, receiving a certificate in 1960. While in New York, he helped organize the April 1959 Youth March for Integrated Schools, an event at which Martin Luther King Jr. spoke.

== Communist Party involvement ==
In 1950, O'Dell joined the Communist Party USA (CPUSA). He had recently been expelled from the NMU for his left-wing political views. In 1956, prior to his appearance before the Senate Internal Security Subcommittee, O'Dell's home was raided by New Orleans police and a U.S. Marshal. They found communist books as well as a document with organizing instructions for CPUSA members; O'Dell was outraged, claiming the search was illegal and in violation of his 4th Amendment rights. In 1958, after he was subpoenaed by the House Un-American Activities Committee, he resigned from a black-owned insurance company he was working for, rather than create more difficulties for his employers. At the end of the decade, O'Dell dropped out of the CPUSA, later stating he had become convinced "that we would get desegregation, and we would get it before we would get socialism."

In 1961, O'Dell was invited to join the staff of Martin Luther King Jr.'s Southern Christian Leadership Conference (SCLC), and "soon rose to prominence in the organization, in charge of both the New York fundraising office and voter registration operations in several Southern states." In October 1962, the New Orleans Times-Picayune published an article denouncing O'Dell as a CPUSA agent who had "infiltrated to the top administrative post" in the SCLC. King defended the organization by saying they were "on guard against any such infiltration." He said the allegations were "a means of [harassing] Negroes and whites merely because of their belief in integration." King himself was already being monitored for political radicalism. In March 1962, Attorney General Robert F. Kennedy had authorized FBI surveillance of King and his left-wing friend Stanley Levison.

In light of the political accusations against him, O'Dell submitted a temporary letter of resignation from the SCLC in autumn of 1962. At the time, he was reportedly on the verge of being named SCLC's Executive Director. Even while suspended, he still helped with planning the 1963 Birmingham campaign.

== Expulsion from the SCLC ==
O'Dell's relationship to King dated back to the late 1950s when he heard him preach at the Dexter Avenue Baptist Church in Montgomery, Alabama. Because of O'Dell's past CPUSA involvement, King was receiving pressure from many liberal leaders, including the Kennedy brothers John and Robert, to distance himself from O'Dell. Taylor Branch, a historian of the Civil Rights era, remarked that it was ultimately the Kennedy administration that influenced King's decision to oust O'Dell from the SCLC, and not a reflection of King's feelings toward his friend.

In June 1963, some civil rights leaders, including King, met at the White House with President Kennedy, who privately told King to cut ties with Levison and O'Dell due to their Communist connections. King did not part ways with Levison, but he wrote to O'Dell asking him to permanently resign. King explained that "any allusion to the left brings forth an emotional response which would seem to indicate that SCLC and the Southern Freedom Movement are Communist inspired." King said that "O'Dell leaving was a significant sacrifice with sufferings in jail and loss of jobs under racist intimidation." O'Dell submitted his final resignation on July 12, 1963. He said in a letter to King that his SCLC work was "a rewarding experience which I shall always cherish."

After conferring with King, O'Dell decided to accept a less prominent post within the civil rights struggle, but he continued to exert an important influence on it, as well as on King's move to the political left near the end of his life. In a 1989 interview, O'Dell said he understood the practical considerations that compelled his exit from the SCLC:

It wasn't Martin's desire to let me go, but it was his decision not to get embarrassed by this issue. He held on as long as he could, hoping that the pressure from the federal government would ease. But they kept the pressure up. I left SCLC in July 1963. I stayed in touch, and I didn't have to make the effort. If any of their staff came through New York, they would "stop and see Jack".

== Later years ==
O'Dell was associate editor of Freedomways—an African-American leftist political and cultural journal—from its inception in 1961 to its demise in 1985. He regularly wrote editorials and essays for Freedomways. Many of his contributions to the journal were anthologized in a 2012 collection, Climbin' Jacob's Ladder: The Black Freedom Movement Writings of Jack O'Dell.

From 1965 to 1972, he served on the National Coordinating Committee to End the War in Vietnam. He was also a student mentor at the Institute for Community Leadership and at the Jack O'Dell Education Center in King County, Washington.

To deepen his global understanding, O'Dell travelled to South Africa, Palestine, and Central America in the 1970s and 1980s. He worked closely with Jesse Jackson as a senior foreign policy advisor to the "Jesse Jackson for President" campaign in 1984, and as an international affairs consultant to the National Rainbow Coalition. From 1977 to 1997, O'Dell was chairman of the board of the Pacifica Foundation that operates the listener-sponsored Pacifica Radio Network. He taught courses on colonialism and U.S. history at the Antioch Graduate School of Education in Washington, D.C. He was also affiliated with the Committees of Correspondence for Democracy and Socialism.

In his later years, O'Dell and his wife Jane Power lived in Vancouver, British Columbia. He was active in mentoring new generations of political activists—as well as historians of the Civil Rights era—in the Pacific Northwest.

In 2018 a short documentary film, The Issue of Mr. O'Dell, was made about his life. It was directed and produced by Rami Katz.

O'Dell died of a stroke on October 31, 2019, at the age of 96.

== Selected articles and essays ==
- O'Dell, Jack (September 1962). "Report on Voter Registration Work". Southern Christian Leadership Conference.
- —— (Fall 1963). "The Negro People in the Southern Economy". Freedomways. 3 (4): 526–548.
- —— (Spring 1965). "Mississippi—State of the Union". Freedomways. 5 (2): 223–26.
- —— (Winter 1969). "Climbin' Jacob's Ladder: The Life and Times of the Freedom Movement". Freedomways. 9 (1): 7–23.
- —— (Winter 1971). "'A Rock in a Weary Lan': Paul Robeson's Leadership and 'The Movement' in the Decade Before Montgomery". Freedomways. 11 (1): 34–49.
- —— (Fall 1985). "Tracing the Freedom Way". Freedomways. 25 (3): 131–34.
- —— (June 2010). "The Democracy Charter and the Fierce Urgency of Now". The Black Commentator. No. 381. Reprint of an O'Dell speech at a 2004 conference in Stony Brook.
