= Freedomways =

African-American political and cultural journal (1961–1985)

- Former editors: Shirley Graham Du Bois, Esther Cooper Jackson
- Founder: Louis Burnham, Edward Strong, W. E. B. Du Bois and Shirley Graham Du Bois
- First issue: Spring 1961; 65 years ago
- Final issue: Fall 1985
- Company: Freedomways Associates, Inc.
- Country: United States
- Based in: New York City
- Language: English
- ISSN: 0016-061X

Freedomways was the leading African-American theoretical, political and cultural journal of the 1960s–1980s. It began publishing on a quarterly basis in 1961 and ceased in 1985.

The journal's founders were Louis Burnham, Edward Strong, W. E. B. Du Bois, and its first general editor was Shirley Graham Du Bois. It was later edited by Esther Cooper Jackson. For a time, Alice Walker and Angela Davis were contributing editors. The journal's mission was to reflect and possibly influence the rising tide of activism in the U.S., both politically and culturally.

The journal published news articles, essays, poetry, commentary, short stories, book reviews, readers' forums, and artwork. Among the featured visual artists were Jacob Lawrence, Romare Bearden, Elizabeth Catlett, Brumsic Brandon Jr., and Charles White. Freedomways reported on the progressive political movements of the time and especially the American civil rights movement, uniting the diverse perspectives of the North and South. The African-American artists and intellectuals whose work appeared in Freedomways included James Baldwin, Paul Robeson, Nikki Giovanni, and Lorraine Hansberry. Prominent entertainers such as Ruby Dee, Ossie Davis, and Harry Belafonte were consistently involved during most of the journal's existence.

In the 1960s era of anti-colonial victories and Pan-Africanism, Freedomways was notable for its international scope that regularly highlighted political leaders, authors and intellectuals from Africa, the Caribbean, and Latin America. The journal included writings by Kwame Nkrumah, Julius K. Nyerere, Agostinho Neto, Jomo Kenyatta, Claudia Jones, C. L. R. James and Cheddi Jagan, and literary figures such as Pablo Neruda and Derek Walcott. The journal's international aspect was something that editor and contributor John Henrik Clarke emphasized.

In the Fall 1985 issue, associate managing editor Jack O'Dell wrote:

[O]ur journal has been beset with enormous problems of funding, increasing production costs, rising rent, rising mailing rates, etc. After months of discussion by the staff and editors, and after 25 years of continuous publishing, we have decided reluctantly to suspend publication with this issue. Out of this period of suspension and reorganization, it is our fervent hope that FREEDOMWAYS will re-emerge in a new, updated form.

The journal, however, was unable to resume operations, and Fall 1985 turned out to be its last issue.

== See also ==
- Freedom newspaper
