= James E. Jackson =

American political official and activist (1914–2007)

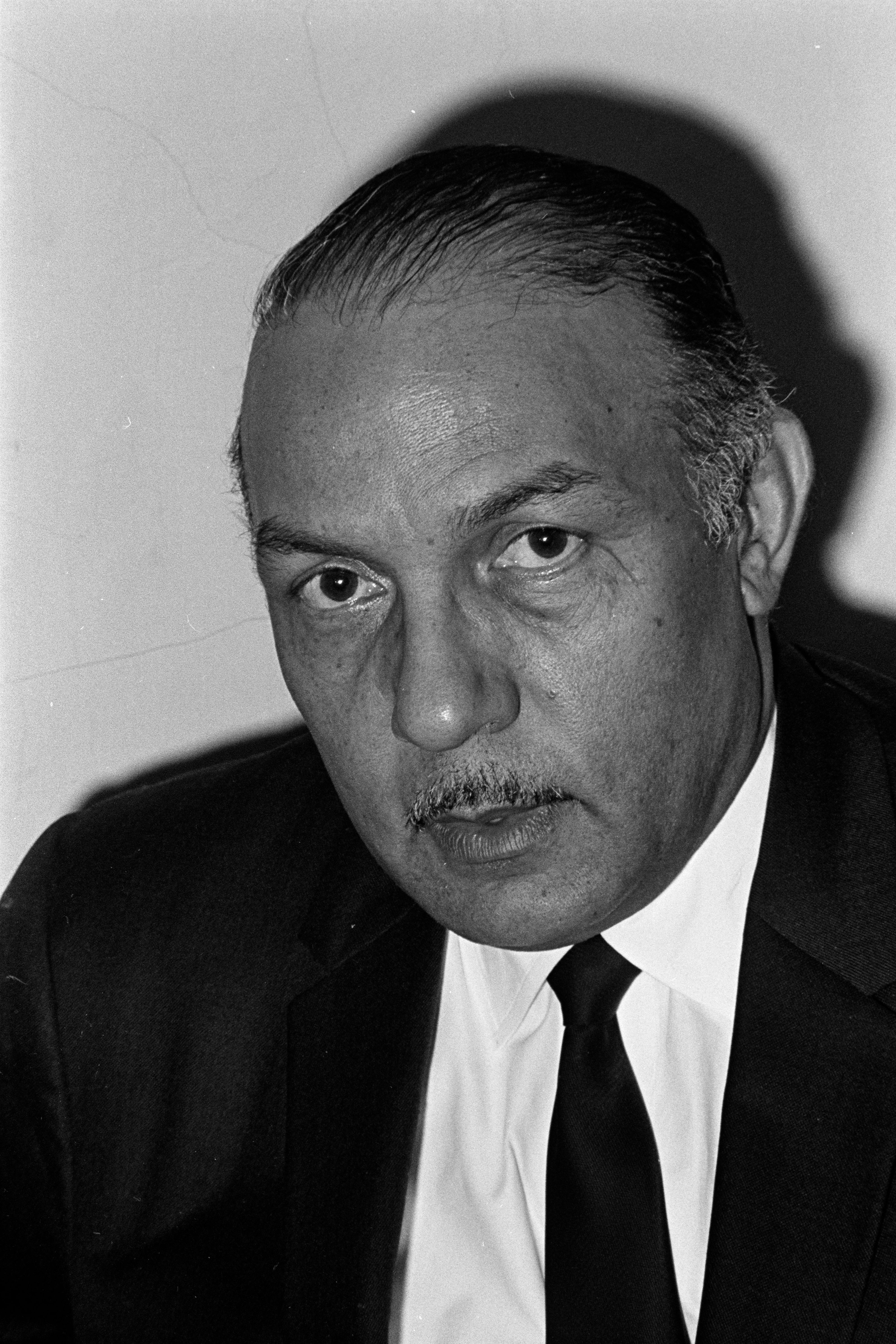
- Jackson in 1968
- Born: James Edward Jackson Jr. November 29, 1914; Jackson Ward, Richmond, Virginia, US
- Died: September 1, 2007 (aged 92); Manhattan, New York City, US
- Education: Virginia Union University; Howard University
- Political party: Communist Party USA (1947–1991)
- Spouse: Esther Cooper Jackson (m. 1941; died 2007)
- Relatives: Alice Jackson Stuart (sister); Esther Georgia Irving Cooper (mother-in-law)

James Edward Jackson Jr. (November 29, 1914 – September 1, 2007) was an American civil rights activist and official in the Communist Party USA. He was also a defendant in Dennis v. United States.

== Early life ==
Jackson's parents were James Jackson Sr. and Clara Kersey Jackson. James Sr. was a Howard University graduate and businessman who was the second pharmacist in the history of Richmond. Clara also attended Howard, studying music as part of one of the Brown's first classes accepting women. On December 14, 1905, Clara and James married each other.

Jackson was born on November 29, 1914, in the Jackson Ward of Richmond, Virginia. Of his five siblings—two dying as children, his sister was Alice Jackson Stuart, who went on to become an educator. He was raised in a progressive environment, with him present as his members of his community planned protests in the back room of his father's pharmacy. He read W. E. B. Du Bois growing up, including his newspaper column As the Crow Flies in The Crisis.

Jackson was middle-class, though attended schools alongside the children of impoverished tobacco workers. He gained interests in art and academics throughout his schooling. He attended Armstrong High School and designed its yearbook in his senior year there. He was a member of the Boy Scouts of America and the first African American member in Virginia, as well as the first African American in Richmond to become an Eagle Scout. At the ceremony for the rank, Virginia Governor John Garland Pollard tossed the badge at Jackson, as opposed to the handshakes he gave the white Scouts. Following the event, he requested to James E. West that the Scouts be desegregated, and resigned from the organization when his request was denied.

=== College ===
Jackson graduated high school at age 16, then enrolled at Virginia Union University in February 1931 and studied chemistry, achieving average grades. He began his activism, being elected student body president of the freshman class. In the second quarter of 1931, he was chosen to attend a YMCA conference in Kings Mountain, North Carolina. There, he met Communist Junius Scales, which led Jackson to joining the Communist Party USA by the third quarter of 1931.

He also studied pharmacology at Howard University, where cofounded the Southern Negro Youth Congress and served as its Executive Director. In 1938, he – alongside the Congress of Industrial Organizations – led group strikes which involved as many as 5,000 tobacco worlers who were paid $5 per week.

== Career ==
Jackson in 1941

Jackson was a founding member of the National Negro Congress, having attended its February 1936 conference in Chicago. He contributed to Gunnar Myrdal's An American Dilemma, as an investigator. To contribute, he traveled to Nashville, Tennessee, where he met Esther Cooper Jackson; they married in 1941 and moved to Birmingham, Alabama.

Jackson worked closely with W. E. B. Du Bois, with Jackson later being interviewed for David Levering Lewis' biography of Du Bois. He went on to work at Fisk University, where he met his future wife, Esther Cooper Jackson. During World War II, he served in an all-black engineer unit, helping restore the Burma Road. He served for eighteen months, and was a sergeant by the time of his retirement.

Following the war, Jackson and Esther moved to Louisiana. There, he chaired the Communist Party of Louisiana. After attempting to unionize maritime workers, he fled the state to avoid a possible assassination. Later in 1947, he led the union of the Ford River Rouge complex. He and Esther—leader of the Michigan branch of the Civil Rights Congress at the time—lived in Detroit with Coleman Young, who went on to serve as the city's first African American mayor.

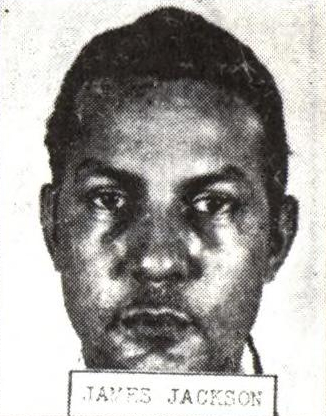
Jackson's FBI mugshot, 1951

In 1951, Jackson was a defendant in Dennis v. United States. A black liberationist, he was one of 21 indicted by the Smith Act for advocating the overthrow of the United States Government. He and five other indictees hid from the government until they surrendered to attorney Paul W. Williams in 1955, and was held for a $20,000 bond. During their trials, Esther established the James E. Jackson Defense Committee. Following Yates v. United States in 1957, all indictments were unanimously reversed in the court of appeals in 1958.

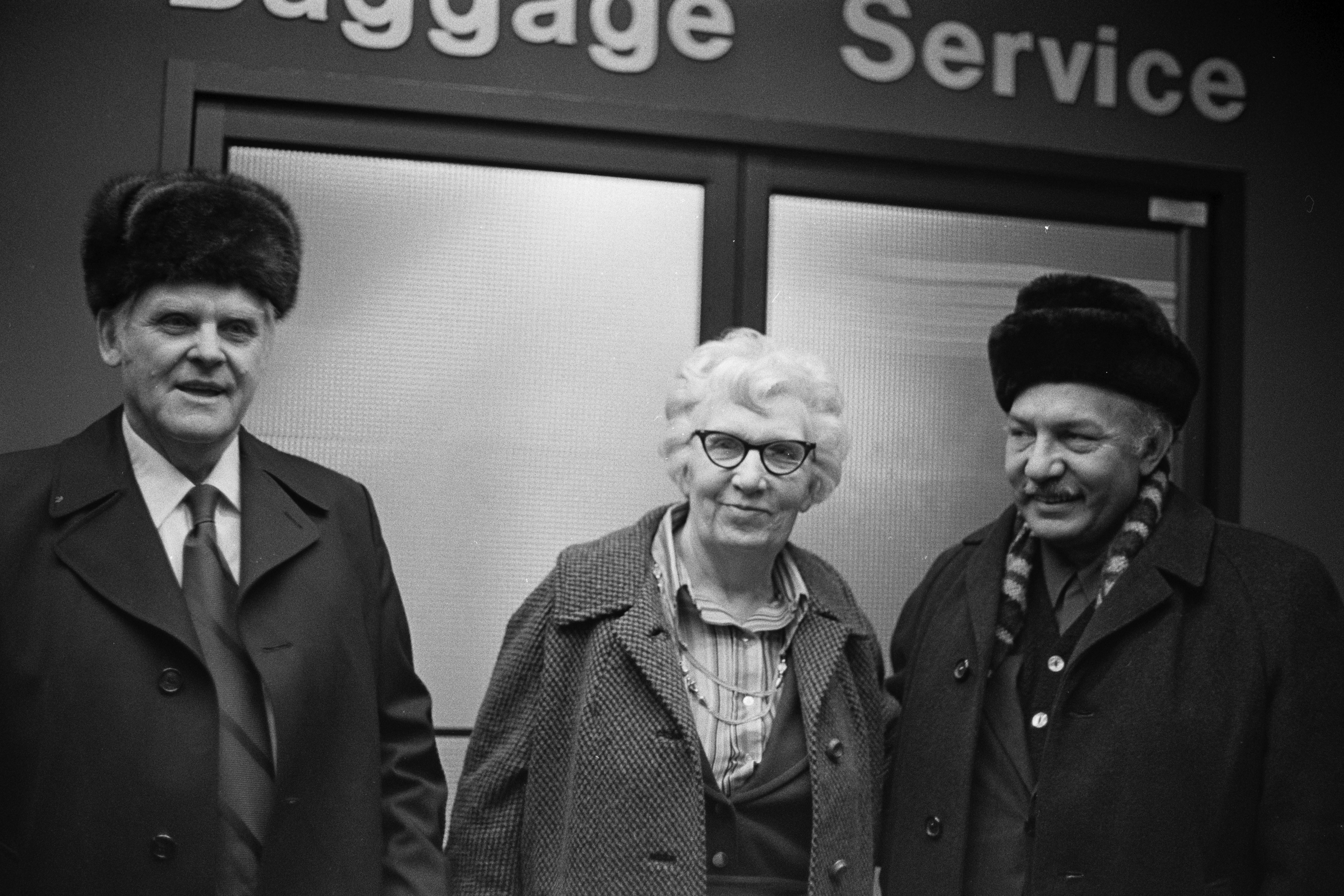
Gus Hall (left), Helen Winter (center) and Jackson return from the 25th Congress of the Communist Party of the Soviet Union, March 7, 1976

In 1952, Jackson was appointed Southern secretary of the Communist Party. He edited its newspaper in the early 1960s and was later appointed International Affairs Secretary, followed by National Educational Director. He also served as Chief of Southern Affairs in the early 1950s. He attended 21st Congress of the Communist Party of the Soviet Union in 1959. He was questioned by authorities upon his return, and he pled the Fifth Amendment 88 times. In 1962, he and fellow CPUSA member Philip Bart were sentenced to six month of jail for contempt of court in a trial against Benjamin J. Davis Jr. and Gus Hall.

== Later life and death ==
Jackson retired following the Communist Party's split in 1991. After retiring, he moved to Brooklyn. He died on September 1, 2007, aged 92, in Manhattan. His papers are held by the New York Public Library.

== Bibliography ==
- The View from Here: Commentaries on Peace and Freedom (1963)
- U.S. Negroes in Battle: From Little Rock to Watts (A Diary of Events—1957-1965) (1967)
- Revolutionary Tracings (1974)

== See also ==
- Communist Party USA and African Americans
