= Southern Negro Youth Congress =

American left-wing youth organization

- Members of the Southern Negro Youth Congress Meet with Idaho Senator Glen Taylor
- Founded: 1937; 89 years ago
- Dissolved: 1949; 77 years ago

The Southern Negro Youth Congress was an American organization established in 1937 at a conference in Richmond, Virginia. It was established as a left-wing civil rights organization, arising from the National Negro Congress (NNC) and the leftist student movement of the 1930s. The SNYC aimed to empower black people in the Southern region to fight for their rights and envisioned interracial working-class coalitions as the way to dismantle the southern caste system. The NNC itself had been created in 1936 to address the economic and discriminatory challenges faced by African Americans, especially in New Deal programs.

The Southern Negro Youth Congress consisted of young leaders who participated in the National Negro Congress. The first gathering of the Southern Negro Youth Congress consisted of a wide range of individuals. Such individuals as representatives from almost all the black colleges in the country, Boy and Girl Scouts, young steel workers, and even members of the YMCA all joined together to form the Southern Negro Youth Congress.

The Southern Negro Youth Congress felt that the major threat to democracy was not communism or socialism but rather fascism, not only to the black population but also a major threat to the white population as well. Many members of the Southern Negro Youth Congress felt that it was a great organization because it allowed people to not only settle into the Southern areas but also take action to change it for the better as well.

The Southern Negro Youth Congress engaged in many activities during the late 1930s and 1940s such as leading boycotts against discriminatory working environments, registering African-American votes, discussed problems with government officials in Washington, D.C., organized workers into unions and assisted rural African-Americans in legal cases. The Southern Negro Youth Congress performed such studies as taking items being purchased in a black community and then comparing the prices to those same items being purchased in a white community. This study showed that prices for the same goods were 20-30% higher in the black communities than they were in the white communities, which meant that the citizens who were struggling most to survive were actually paying higher prices for the items that were necessary for them to live.

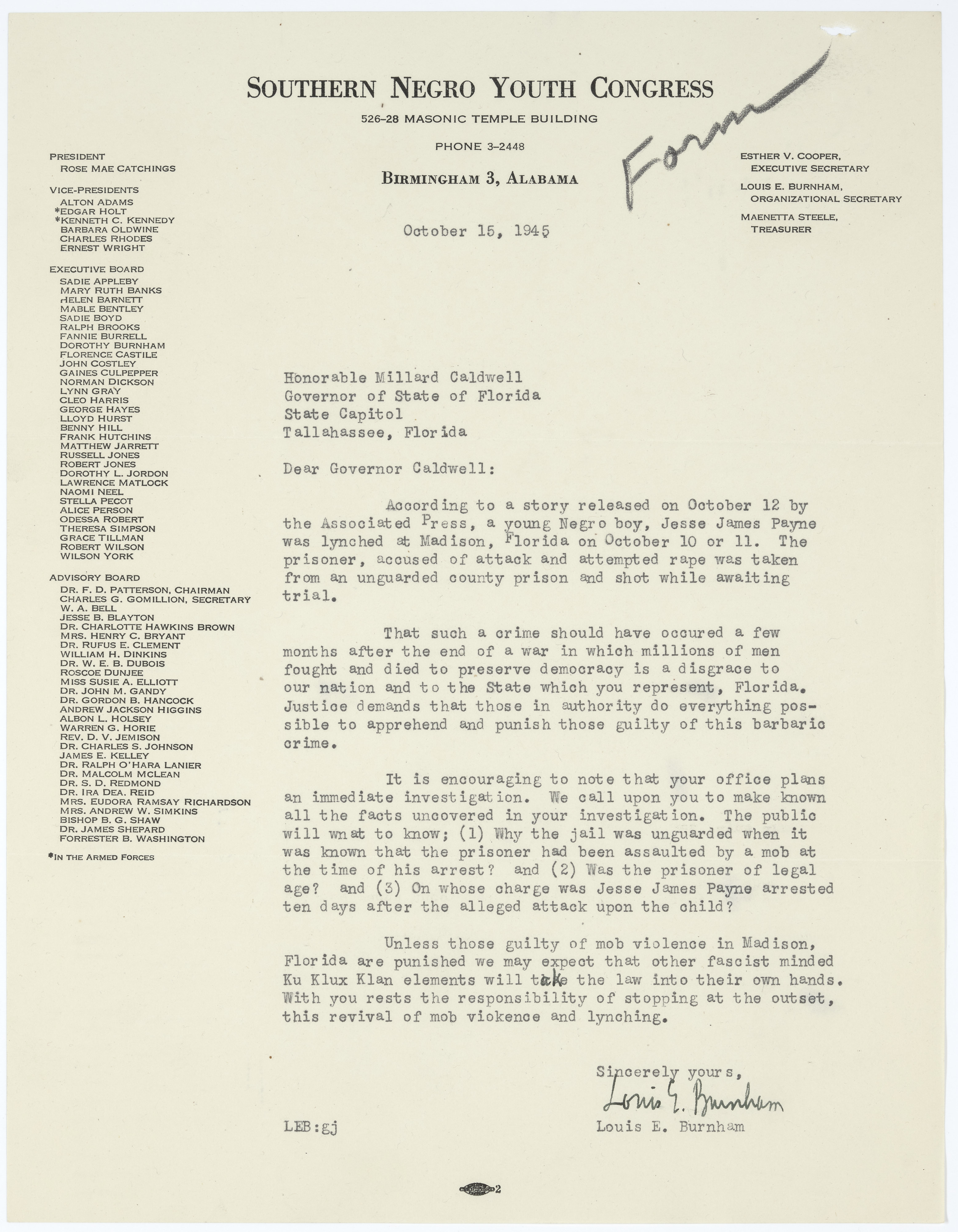
SNYC letterhead, 1945, showing officers, Executive Board and Advisory Board

Prominent members of the Southern Negro Youth Congress included veteran activists James E. Jackson, Helen Gray, Esther Cooper Jackson (at the far left of the photo with Senator Taylor), Louis Burnham (to the left of, and holding a paper with, Senator Taylor in the photo) and Edward E. Strong. At one time or another it had the support of prominent figures that included Mary McCleod Bethune, Charlotte Hawkins Brown, Franklin D. Roosevelt and W. E. B. Du Bois. At its prime the Southern Negro Youth Congress claimed that it represented about 250,000 young black southerners but due to insufficient records these numbers could not be verified. The Southern Negro Youth Congress saw its demise in 1949 in part due to the postwar period of the United States caught in the Cold War as well as fear, hysteria, racial violence and loss of jobs that led to many difficulties for the Southern Negro Youth Congress leaders to solve.

== Early years and beginnings ==
Prior to the creation of the Southern Negro Youth Congress, many African-Americans during the first 30 years of the twentieth century struggled with financial hardships and often were near the bottom of the American economic and political life. The National Negro Congress was held in Chicago in 1936---although the young were present felt the need to create their own congress in hopes of not being hampered by elder members of the African-American movement during this time. Although there was much debate on where the first Southern Negro Youth Congress meeting would be held it was eventually decided that it would be held in Richmond, Virginia on February 13 and 14, 1937 at the Fifth Baptist Church. The first Southern Negro Youth Congress meeting consisted of 534 delegates that represented 250,000 young people in 23 states. Of these delegates a representative from all historically black colleges was present as well and members from YMCA branches and Girl and Boy scouts across the region. Like the National Negro Congress before it the Southern Negro Youth Congress also consisted of Communist party members as well.

== First assembly ==
The Southern Negro Youth Congress met on February 13 and 14, 1937, where they were divided into groups to discuss problems and to advocate ideas to the general body for approval, modification or rejection. Prominent adult leaders such as John P Davis, executive secretary of the National Negro Congress, as well as many other leaders from the Christian Youth Council of North America, members of the YMCA and teachers from the black colleges around the area assisted the divided groups of the SNYC. The key components of the first Congress were noted by the seminar on “The Role of the Negro Church in Solving Social and Economic Problems of the Negro Youth,” as well as the keynote address delivered by Dr. Mordecai Johnson, the first black president of Howard University. Dean Herbert M. Smith spearheaded the seminar stating that Negro ministers had to interest themselves in matters with church members if they wanted the church to remain the greatest instrument of social enlightenment. Following the seminar, Dr. Johnson addressed the delegates with his keynote urging the audience to refrain from the status quo and to take a role in abolishing injustice caused by the American system against African-Americans. Dr. Johnson’s keynote addresses was received with great enthusiasm and applause from the delegates and observers, as it mainly was filled with advice for the young and criticized the old.

=== First session ===
The first conference also saw the establishment of the infrastructure of the Southern Negro Youth Congress in the National Office located in Richmond. The Congress looked to make officers consisting of young people who lived and worked in the South. The national officers elected to serve a one-year term were as follows: William F. Richardson as National Chairman, Edward Strong as Executive Secretary, C. Columbus Alston as National Field Representative, and James A. Cox as Treasurer. National officers were responsible for recruitment for the Southern Negro Youth Congress. The most frequently used method for expansion was the membership drives that consisted of three different types: affiliate, club, and individual.

== Four-point program ==
Throughout its history, SNYC followed a four-point program that was utilized in almost all issues and campaigns. In addition to the SNYC, 100 local councils associated with the group supported this four-point program. The four-point program sought to improve the areas of the South in citizenship, education, jobs, and health. In adopting these points, the SNYC attracted acceptance not only from African-Americans but white citizens in the south, as well.

=== Tobacco strikes ===
The Southern Negro Youth Congress was caught in two spontaneous strikes that occurred in Richmond, Virginia in 1937. The first strike occurred on April 16, 1937 against the Carrington & Michaux Tobacco Stemming Company. The second strike occurred on May 7, 1937 against the I. N. Vaughn & Company. At the time, the tobacco industry already had an established tobacco union, The Tobacco Workers’ International Union, which followed the policy of occupational segregation rather than racial discrimination which allowed them to ignore the rights and needs of African-American workers. In order to get the black workers organized, the Southern Negro Youth Congress sent a field representative, C. Columbus Alston. In addition to being a member of the Southern Negro Youth Congress, Alston was also a union member of the Youth Committee of the American Federation of Labor and helped organize the black workers into the Tobacco Stemmers and Laborers Industrial Union. With the help of Alston and Southern Negro Youth Congress, the Tobacco Stemmers and Laborers Industrial Union was able to draft a list of demands aimed at the Tobacco companies. Some of the demands listed by the black tobacco workers consisted of having higher wages, shorter working-hours and better working conditions. Within 48 hours of the union’s committee presenting its case to the management of the company, an agreement was reached with Frank Kruch of the State Labor Department and the owners of the companies.

=== Other campaigns ===
Although the Southern Negro Youth Congress often campaigned for the rights of black workers in the South, they also targeted lynching crimes, the poll tax, and registering African-Americans to vote. The Southern Negro Youth Congress sought to combat the lynch terror that was occurring against the youth throughout the south. The Southern Negro Youth Congress teamed up with the National Association for the Advancement of Colored People (NAACP), the Southern Conference on Human Welfare as well as many other organizations in hopes to support legislation that would make lynching a federal crime. Members of the Southern Negro Youth Congress were encouraged by members of the NAACP to send telegrams, letters and postcards to delegates in the area and more importantly, President Franklin D. Roosevelt. Since its inception, the Southern Negro Youth Congress attempted to get many blacks to vote in the South, despite the poll taxes. The Southern Negro Youth Congress pushed this movement through their editorial “Citizenship Campaign” which stated that the majority of problems blacks faced in the South could be changed if they voted. Besides editorials, the Southern Negro Youth Congress also passed out pamphlets, leaflets, manuals, and buttons to encourage interest in voting. Although not always successful in their tactics, the Southern Negro Youth Congress did excel in being one of the first community groups to have citizenship campaigns that included voter registration clinics.

In 1942, Mildred McAdory and three other SNYC members were beaten and arrested after moving a segregation barrier in a bus in Fairfield, Alabama. The incident gained national publicity with the SNYC pamphlet For Common Courtesy on Common Carriers and a brief boycott of buses in Birmingham.

A sample of the aims and projects of the Southern Negro Youth Conference can be found in Louis Burnham's organizational report at the 1942 Atlanta joint meeting of SNYC's Advisory Board and National Council. The proposals were:

- Creating some active councils in Alabama, Tennessee and Louisiana, to gain 3,000 new members in those areas by SNYC's sixth anniversary.
- Establish six more industrial youth centers in New Orleans and cities and towns in Alabama.
- Create councils on college campuses in the states mentioned above, and in Atlanta.
- Three campaigns: "expand opportunities for Negro youth to service in flying services of Army and Navy;" voting and education for citizenship; develop opportunities for war industry jobs and training.

All the proposals in Burnham's report passed.

=== Other tactics ===
Besides campaigning, the Southern Negro Youth Congress also believed in the power of using the arts as an instrument to promote their causes to the youth. The two main tactics used by the Southern Negro Youth Congress were poetry and drama. The Congress helped this movement by creating a literary publication Cavalcade: The March of Southern Negro Youth and a creative association entitled the Association of Young Writers and Artists to allow blacks to spread their expressions. In addition, the Southern Negro Youth Congress Community Theatre also performed across the South to reacquaint Southern African-Americans with their heritage, as well as show them that struggle was necessary to demonstrate that America should change its democratic pronouncement.

== Communism in the Southern Negro Youth Congress ==
Since the formation of the Southern Negro Youth Congress in 1937, there was a strong communist representation present. With the emergence of the American Communist Party and their visibility from 1935 to 1939, the United States government began to take actions to suppress organizations with Communist members. From 1940 to 1952, the FBI gathered data on the Southern Negro Youth Congress through technical surveillance such as telephone and microphone taps. During the McCarthy era, SNYC was on the Attorney General's List of Subversive Organizations from at least 1948 through 1961. The FBI paid informants and paid for subscriptions to the Southern Negro Youth Congress’s publications. However, the imminent perception of the Southern Negro Youth Congress as a Communist Party dominated the mass, which subsequently led to the downfall of many Southern Negro Youth Congress campaigns and its popularity. Sallye Davis, mother of communist scholar and activist Angela Y. Davis, was active in the Southern Negro Youth Congress in Birmingham, Alabama.

== Eighth and last conference meeting ==
The Southern Negro Youth Conference in 1948 held their eighth Southern Negro Youth Congress Conference that also happened to be the last conference. The meeting was held on April 23, 24, and 25, 1948 in Birmingham, Alabama where the headquarters was located. The eighth conference attracted national news headlines as well as showed the extent of control over the lives of citizens that lived in the South. During this time the Police Commissioner was Bull Connor who used everything in his power to prevent the Southern Negro Youth Congress from gathering stating that the separation of races was required and that any action that disobeyed this law was to be reinforced by the police. The Southern Negro Youth Congress looked for churches to hold the meetings but upon securing a location to use Bull Connor would often intervene and call the Minister of the church facilities being used and state that since the Southern Negro Youth Congress was an interracial organization that the meeting would violate the state of Alabama’s laws. Three black churches turned down the Southern Negro Youth Congress before Reverend H. Douglas Oliver allowed the meeting to be held in his pastor of the Alliance Gospel Tabernacle. The meeting was held on May 1, 1948 and upon arrival all white members were arrested and charged for breaking the segregation laws. Despite this occurrence the meeting still commenced with the remaining black members under the segregated conditions. At the meeting the Southern Negro Youth Congress passed resolutions condemning the segregation laws and denying any affiliation with the Communist Party. The contentions of the party were not accepted by the U.S. Department of Justice and shortly after the meeting Edward K. Weaver; president of the Southern Negro Youth Congress was forced to resign.

== Aftermath and legacy ==
With the end of the eighth Southern Negro Youth Congress and the resigning of the president the Congress began to lose rapid popularity in the south and north as membership declined drastically. The opposing powers against the Congress were too much to withstand as well as the times that occurred post World War II. The United States was undergoing what later became known as the Cold War and this led to heightened racial tension and encouraged local and national law enforcement agencies to increase the surveillance of radical and subversive organization. According to the United States Attorney General, Tom Clark, the Southern Negro Youth Congress appeared as a subversive organization. The Southern Negro Youth Congress was based on two fundamental objectives which were to democratize the South and to provide equal opportunities to its residents and although the Southern Negro Youth Congress disbanded by 1949 the effects of the Southern Negro Youth Congress efforts were not lost in that instilled an essence and spirit into the people for the further Civil Rights Movement that would occur a decade later.

== See also ==
- Colored Conventions Movement
- Gwendolyn Midlo Hall
- Louis E. Burnham
- Henry O. Mayfield
