= List of Sigma Gamma Rho members =

Sigma Gamma Rho is a historically African American sorority that was founded in 1922 at Butler University. Below is a list of some of the notable members of Sigma Gamma Rho Sorority.

== Business ==
- Fatim Badjie - entrepreneur, strategic communications expert, and infrastructure development partner in Gambia
- Mary T. Washington Wylie - first African-American Certified Public Accountant
- Lisa Price - founder/CEO of Carol's Daughter; inducted at the sorority's Northeastern Regional Conference, Charlotte, NC, April 22, 2016
- Kim Roxie (honorary) - founder of LAMIK cosmetics; breast cancer advocate; inducted at the 60th International Biennial Boulé, Houston, 2024
- Shontay Lundy (honorary) - founder of Black Girl Sunscreen, the first Black-owned sunscreen brand in major retailers
- Michele A. Newman-Lawrence (honorary) - JPMorgan Chase executive; first Black woman to run for Congress in Pennsylvania's 2nd District

== Civil rights and activism ==
- Sandra Bland - activist; her following a traffic stop invigorated the Black Lives Matter movement
- Hydeia Broadbent (honorary) - United-States–based HIV/AIDS activist
- Gwen Carr (honorary) - activist, public speaker, and author
- Priscilla Williams-Till (honorary) - educator; founder of the Emmett Till Justice for Families Foundation; cousin of Emmett Till
- Ann-Marie Dillard (honorary) - global humanitarian and trauma-informed therapist; founder of Project Safety Nets

== Education ==
- Lucille Baldwin Brown - first Black public county librarian in the state of Florida;
- Selena Sloan Butler (Eta Sigma) - founder and first president of the National Congress of Colored Parents and Teachers Association; co-founder of the National Parent-Teacher Association
- Mary Ellen Cable - educator and principal of Indianapolis Public Schools no. 4
- Tressie McMillan Cottom - American writer, sociologist, and professor
- Rosa Slade Gragg - educator who founded the first black vocational school in Detroit, Michigan
- Mary Lou Allison Gardner Little - (Alpha) - educator and primary founder of Sigma Gamma Rho
- Lorraine A. Williams - first African-American woman to serve as vice president for academic affairs at Howard University
- Kimberlyn Leary (honorary) - Harvard Kennedy School lecturer; executive vice president, Urban Institute; advisor to the Obama and Biden White Houses
- Cassandra Wells (honorary) - first African American woman to earn a Ph.D. in marketing from Georgia Tech; academic leader at Morehouse College

== Entertainment ==
- Marsha Ambrosius (honorary) - R&B singer and songwriter
- Vanessa Bell Armstrong - four-time Grammy-nominated gospel singer
- Deshauna Barber (Alpha Zeta) - Miss USA 2016
- Hettie Vyrine Barnhill - choreographer and dancer
- Louise Beavers (honorary) - film and television actress
- Teisha Brown - (honorary) - R&B singer, member of Brownstone
- Jekalyn Carr - (honorary) - gospel singer, speaker, entrepreneur, actress, and author
- Maranda Curtis (honorary) - gospel singer and worship leader
- DJ Spinderella (honorary) - DJ, rapper, and producer best known as a member of Salt-N-Pepa
- Ellia English - singer, dancer, stage and film actress
- Ezinma - (honorary) - violinist, model, music educator, and film composer
- Fantasia (honorary) - R&B singer, actress, American Idol contestant
- Sheila Fortson - television journalist, radio host, and media/communications specialist
- Mercedes Gilbert - actress, novelist, and poet
- Nicci Gilbert - R&B singer, founding member of Brownstone
- Trudy Haynes - television news reporter; first African American TV weather reporter in the United States
- Anna Maria Horsford - actress
- Arin Jackson - (honorary) R&B singer, member of Brownstone
- Alexis Jones (honorary) - Grammy-nominated singer and actress
- Jennifer Jones (honorary) - first Black Rockette (1987)
- Ta'Rhonda Jones (honorary) - actress
- Eva Jessye - conductor and composer
- Maysa Leak - jazz singer known for solo work and work with the band Incognito
- MC Lyte - rapper
- Sonia Manzano (honorary) - actress and writer; "Maria" on Sesame Street for 44 years; 15 Daytime Emmy Awards
- Dwan "Dee" Martin (honorary) - owner of Urban Luxe Cafe; salon chain owner; real estate investor; 2024 class
- Tasha Page-Lockhart (honorary) - Christian R&B and gospel singer
- MC Sha-Rock (honorary) - first female MC in hip-hop history; member of The Funky 4 + 1
- Marilyn McCoo - singer, actress, and television presenter
- Hattie McDaniel - actress, singer-songwriter, comedian, and first African American winner of an Academy Award; charter member of the Sigma Sigma Chapter in Los Angeles, the sorority's first West Coast chapter, founded July 1939
- Carriebel Cole Plummer - dance, dance teacher, and choreographer
- Kelly Price (honorary) - Grammy-nominated R&B and gospel singer
- Martha Reeves - lead singer of Martha and the Vandellas
- Vickilyn Reynolds (honorary) - film and television actress and singer
- LaTavia Roberson (honorary) - R&B singer, entrepreneur, television personality; founding member of Destiny's Child
- Rebecca Roberts - (honorary) - radio commentator and curator of programming at Planet Word
- Wendy Raquel Robinson (honorary) - actress, producer, and co-founder of Amazing Grace Conservatory
- Victoria Rowell - actress, screenwriter, director, and producer
- Lisa Simone (honorary) - U.S. Air Force veteran; Grammy-nominated vocalist; daughter of Nina Simone
- Tonya Williams - actress, director, and producer
- Tami Roman Youngblood (honorary) - actress and producer; (The Real World, Basketball Wives)

== Law ==
- Piper D. Griffin - Associate Justice of the Louisiana Supreme Court
- Anita Laster Mays - judge of the Ohio Eighth District Court of Appeals
- Ruth Whitehead Whaley - attorney, first Black woman admitted to the bar in North Carolina

== Literature and journalism ==
- Alice Childress - novelist and playwright
- Alice Allison Dunnigan - first African-American female journalist credentialed to cover the White House in 1948
- Cynthia Horner - writer and magazine editor
- Beverly Jenkins - American author of historical and contemporary romance novels
- Erika Renee Land (Lambda Delta) - war poet, author, and spoken word performer
- Era Bell Thompson - writer and editor with Ebony

== Medicine ==
- Kathleen Jones-King - physician, one of the first Caribbean-born women to earn a medical degree at Howard University College of Medicine

== Politics ==
- Tiffany T. Alston - Maryland House of Delegates
- Lindy Boggs - first woman from Louisiana elected to United States House of Representatives; first woman to chair the Democratic National Convention
- Aisha Braveboy - former member of the Maryland House of Delegates, state's attorney for Prince George's County
- Eugenia Charles - first woman to hold the position of Prime Minister of Dominica
- Gwen Cherry - first African American female to serve in the Florida House of Representatives
- Natasha Grey-Brookes (honorary) - first woman to lead a major Saint Kitts and Nevis political party, the People's Action Movement
- Robin Kelly - United States House of Representatives
- Barbara Lee - (honorary) - United States House of Representatives, Mayor of Oakland, California, chair of the Congressional Black Caucus
- JoAnn Maxey - Nebraska Legislature
- Wanda Brownlee Paige - Kansas House of Representatives
- Georgia Davis Powers (honorary, 1993) - Kentucky Senate
- Mary Pruitt (honorary) - Tennessee House of Representatives
- Leah Landrum Taylor - Arizona Senate
- Nina Turner - Ohio Senate

== Religion ==
- Carolyn Tyler Guidry - second women to become a bishop of the African Methodist Episcopal Church

== Sports ==
- Sharrieffa Barksdale - hurdler who competed at the 1984 Summer Olympics
- Femita Ayanbeku (honorary) - three-time U.S. Paralympian; founder of Limb-it-less Creations
- Tiana Bartoletta - (honorary) track and field athlete
- Michelle Carter (honorary) - three-time U.S. Olympian; first American woman to win Olympic gold in shot put
- Maritza Correia - first African-American woman to make the U.S. Olympic swim team and win a medal
- Tonya Edwards - (honorary) - professional basketball player and current assistant coach of the Chicago Sky
- Carmelita Jeter - sprinter, who competed in the 60, 100, and 200 meter races, winning three Olympic medals
- Bianca Knight (honorary) - former track and field athlete and Olympic gold medalist
- Yolett McPhee-McCuin - head coach of Ole Miss Rebels women's basketball
- Donna Orender - collegiate and professional basketball player; president of the Women's National Basketball Association
- Renee Powell - PGA Hall of Fame golfer; second Black woman to compete on the LPGA Tour; first woman of color elected to the membership in the PGA of America
- Sheryl Swoopes (honorary) - professional basketball player; first player to be signed in the Women's National Basketball Association; three-time WNBA Most Valuable Player
- Elana Meyers Taylor (honorary) - Olympic champion bobsledder; most decorated Black athlete in Winter Olympic history
- Lynette Woodard (honorary) - Olympic gold medalist; first female Harlem Globetrotter
