= A Hero Ain't Nothin' but a Sandwich =

A Hero Ain't Nothin' but a Sandwich may refer to:

- A Hero Ain't Nothin' but a Sandwich (novel)
- A Hero Ain't Nothin' but a Sandwich (film)
