= Freedom (American newspaper) =

1950–1955 monthly newspaper on African-American issues

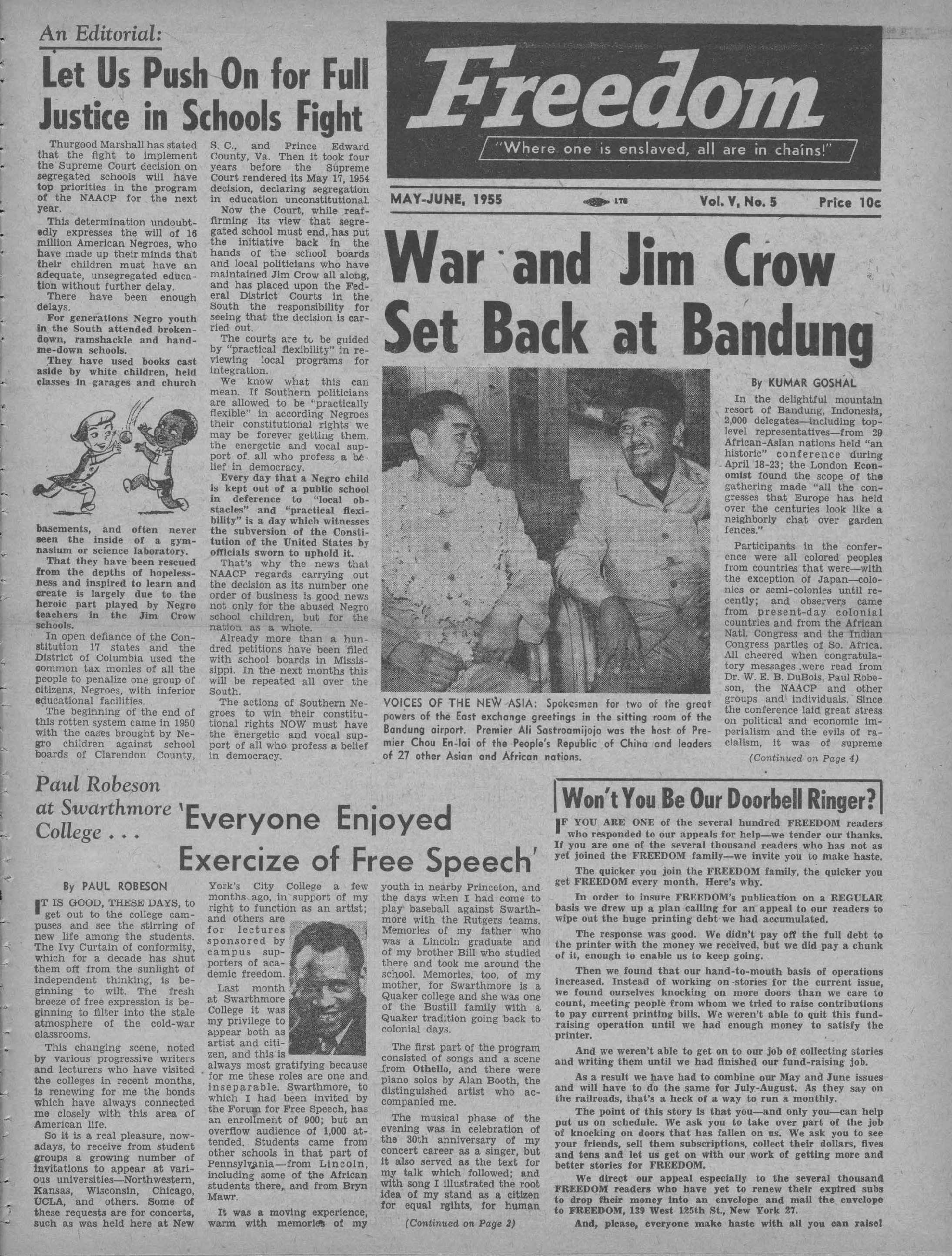
- Front page of Freedom newspaper, Vol. 5, No. 5, May – June 1955
- Editor: Louis E. Burnham
- Staff writers: Paul Robeson; Lorraine Hansberry; Alice Childress; Thelma Dale; Lloyd L. Brown; John H. Clarke W. E. B. Du Bois; Vicki Garvin; Shirley Graham; Lucy Parsons; John O. Killens; Beah Richards; Eslanda Robeson; Paul Robeson Jr. Robert F. Williams; Ollie Harrington; Moneta Barnett
- Photographer: Inge Hardison
- Categories: African-American newspapers
- Frequency: Monthly; bimonthly in 1954–1955 summers
- Format: Tabloid
- Publisher: Freedom Associates
- Founder: Paul Robeson; W. E. B. Du Bois
- First issue: November 1950; 75 years ago
- Final issue Number: August 1955; Vol 5 No 6
- Country: United States
- Based in: New York City
- Language: English language
- Website: dlib.nyu.edu/freedom/
- OCLC: 904283253

Freedom was a monthly newspaper focused on African-American issues published from 1950 to 1955. The publication was associated primarily with the internationally renowned singer, actor and then officially disfavored activist Paul Robeson, whose column, with his photograph, ran on most of its front pages. Freedom's motto was: "Where one is enslaved, all are in chains!" The newspaper has been described as "the most visible African American Left cultural institution during the early 1950s." In another characterization, "Freedom paper was basically an attempt by a small group of black activists, most of them Communists, to provide Robeson with a base in Harlem and a means of reaching his public... The paper offered more coverage of the labor movement than nearly any other publication, particularly of the left-led unions that were expelled from the CIO in the late 1940s... [It] encouraged its African American readership to identify its struggles with anti-colonial movements in Africa, Asia, and the Caribbean. Freedom gave extensive publicity to... the struggle against apartheid."

== History ==
Freedom was a venture by Robeson. It was named after Freedom's Journal, the first Black newspaper published in the United States. Louis Burnham, the former executive secretary of the Southern Negro Youth Congress (SNYC), was the Managing Editor of Freedom. Burnham was responsible for getting the monthly started. George B. Murphy Jr. (vice chairman of the American Committee for the Protection of Foreign Born and vice president of the International Workers Order), was the general manager. The monthly shared office space and staff with the Council on African Affairs. Each issue cost $0.10; a subscription for a year was $1.

When Lorraine Hansberry, later a Tony Award-winning playwright but then (in her own description) a confused 21 year old, went to work for Freedom soon after its founding, she found "an office furnished with two desks, one typewriter and a remarkably enthusiastic working staff of two": Louis Burnham, the editor, and Edith Roberts, the office manager.

The periodical became a magnet for primarily African-American leftist activists and artists, including Esther Cooper Jackson, former SNYC executive Edward Strong, historian Herbert Aptheker, members of the New York Negro Labor Council and members of the Committee for the Negro in the Arts, including Ossie Davis, Ruby Dee and Harry Belafonte. It promoted African-American culture, showcasing, among others, playwright Lorraine Hansberry, playwright and fiction writer Alice Childress (whose novel Like One of the Family first appeared serially in Freedom), novelists Lloyd Brown, Julian Mayfield, and John O. Killens, and poet Frank Marshall Davis. Alice Childress recalled "Eslanda Robeson bringing in the works of young artists, introducing them to the editor, asking him to give them an opportunity to present their talents in Freedom."

It supported the working class and the labor movement, as well as a variety of international issues, including world peace, human rights in Latin America, and the anti-colonial freedom struggle. It advocated for third-party politics. A rarity among American newspapers, Freedom consistently opposed the Korean War, linking the conflict to colonialism, discrimination against Black people in the armed forces, and Jim Crow laws at home. Presciently, in a front page Freedom column, "Ho Chi Minh is Toussaint L'Ouverture of Indo China," Robeson asked [emphasis in the original]: "Shall Negro sharecroppers from Mississippi be sent to shoot down brown-skinned peasants in Vietnam—to serve the interests of those who oppose Negro liberation at home and colonial freedom abroad?"

Women on the editorial board, and among its contributors, brought a proto-feminist viewpoint to Freedom, which published pieces expressing those views. Among these women were Vicki Garvin, whose article in the first issue began, "If it is true, as has often been stated, that a people can rise no higher than its women, then Negro people have a long way to go before reaching the ultimate goal of complete freedom and equality in the United States." Lorraine Hansberry started at Freedom as a subscription clerk, and subsequently worked as receptionist, typist, editorial assistant and ultimately associate editor. Hansberry covered local, national, and international stories that involved both national and international travel. Other contributors included Childress, Dorothy Burnham and Eslanda Goode Robeson. Thelma Dale worked at the monthly. Shirley Graham Du Bois was part of the "Freedom Family" as the paper's associates referred to themselves.

Freedom put on pageants celebrating African-American history. To commemorate the newspaper's first birthday, Hansberry wrote the script for a rally at Rockland Palace, a then-famous Harlem hall, on "the history of the Negro newspaper in America and its fighting role in the struggle for a people's freedom, from 1827 to the birth of FREEDOM." Performers in this pageant included Robeson, his longtime accompanist Lawrence Brown, the multi-discipline artist Asadata Dafora, and numerous others. The following year, Hansberry and Childress, an already produced playwright, collaborated on a pageant for Freedom's Negro History Festival, with Harry Belafonte, Sidney Poitier, Douglas Turner Ward and John O. Killens providing narration.

Freedom ceased publication after its July–August 1955 issue, which included an appeal for financial support on its front page. Ultimately, the monthly failed due not only to financial difficulties, but also to anti-communist FBI harassment. Because of McCarthyism, most Blacks were reluctant to have any association with Robeson or his publication. Although buying a Robeson concert ticket often included a subscription to Freedom, the FBI photographed attendees and recorded their license plate numbers, which would also especially discourage government employees. State and city governments prevented large venues from hosting Robeson, further limiting concert attendance to smaller facilities such as churches and union halls.

== Legacy ==
Following the failure of Freedom, many of those associated with it were able to initiate another periodical, Freedomways. The new quarterly, energized by the revival of the Civil Rights Movement, maintained Freedom's anti-imperialist and anti-Jim Crow stance, while continuing to support Black culture and feminism. In its final issue, the editorial in Freedomways acknowledged the importance of its predecessor Freedom: "The titles of two ventures in publishing helped inspire our name—most significantly, Freedom Newspaper, published by Paul Robeson and edited by Louis E. Burnham, which made such a valuable contribution to our movement in the ’50s."

== See also ==
- List of African-American newspapers in New York
- List of African-American newspapers and media outlets
- Communist Party USA and African Americans
