= Fortson =

Fortson is a surname. Notable people with the surname include:

- Benjamin W. Fortson Jr. (1904–1979), American politician from Georgia
- Benjamin W. Fortson IV, American linguist
- Bettiola Heloise Fortson (1890–1917), poet, suffragist, and civil rights activist
- Danny Fortson (born 1976), American basketball player
- Eleanor Fortson (1904–1997), American politician
- Jody Fortson (born 1997), American football player
- Lucy Fortson, American astronomer
- Sheila Fortson (born 1983), American television journalist, model, and writer

== See also ==
- Fortson, Georgia
