= Shontay Lundy =

American beauty company founder

- Born: October 12, 1982 (age 44); Fort Knox, U.S.
- Education: State University of New York at Cortland; St. Thomas University (Master of Business Administration in Management and Operations)
- Occupations: Cosmetic Innovator; Founder of Black Girl Sunscreen

Shontay Lundy (born October 12, 1982) is an American entrepreneur and activist. She is known for advocating for the visibility and sun safety within communities of color. She is the creator and founder of Black Girl Sunscreen, a sunscreen brand created specifically for people of color. She was awarded the 100 Greatest Innovations of 2018 by Popular Science.

== Early life and education ==
She was born on a military base in Fort Knox, Kentucky but grew up in Upstate New York. Lundy attended Valley Central High School in Montgomery, New York and received her Bachelor's from the State University of New York at Cortland. She then relocated to Miami, Florida to complete her MBA in 2004. In 2006, she completed her Master of Business Administration, Management and Operations from St. Thomas University.

== Career ==
Lundy had a decade-long career in middle and upper management within corporate America. At age 34, Lundy relocated to Los Angeles, California to continue on her career in Cosmetic industry, which led her to formulate the idea of Black Girl Sunscreen. She moved back to south Florida to launch the business. In Miami, Lundy used $33,000 from her personal savings to secure a chemist and manufacturer to introduce the brand birthing, her Sunscreen has since expanded its reach, becoming the first Black-owned sunscreen brand sold in major retailers such as Target, Walmart, and Ulta. In 2020, it secured $1 million in private funding, bringing the company's valuation to $5 million. She has secured partnerships, including collaborations with Disney Studios, USC Women's Track & Field Team, and iHeart Media. Lundy hosts the “Radio-to-Podcast” show, Shamelessly Shontay.

She has partnered with dermatology programs at schools such as George Washington University and Howard University.

Lundy has appeared on Good Morning America, The Sherri Shephard Show, The Real and featured on national radio and news stations across the country, and a guest spot on the 2024 BET Awards. She has been featured on Peacock's original documentary Founding In Color.

=== Activism ===
Her activism centers on inclusivity and health in sun care. Lundy raises awareness about the importance of sun protection for people of color, particularly in the Black community. She has critiqued the lack of representation of Black women in the beauty and skincare industries and calls for more research and development focused on the needs of Black consumers.

=== Honorary memberships ===
Shontay Lundy was inducted as an Honorary Member of Sigma Gamma Rho Sorority, Inc. on July 24, 2026, during its 61st Biennial Boule in Tampa, FL. The 2026 induction class includes women recognized for achievements spanning sports, entertainment, education, public service, advocacy, entrepreneurship, and global humanitarian work, carrying forward the sorority's mission of Greater Service, Greater Progress.

== Awards ==
- Lundy was awarded the 100 Greatest Innovations of 2018 by Popular Science.
- In 2021, she was listed as one of the Forbes Next 1000.
- In 2022, Lundy was awarded the RevolutionHER Trailblazer Award.
- In 2023, Lundy received the Where Brains Meet Beauty Podcast's Archive Award.
- In 2024, Lundy was honored by the Regional Cal Black Chamber of Commerce with a Phenomenal Women Award.
- In 2024, Lundy was honored at the inaugural Visionary Awards hosted by the Cosmetic Executive Women (CEW) organization.
- In 2026, Lundy was inducted as an Honorary Member of Sigma Gamma Rho Sorority, Inc. during its 61st Biennial Boule in Tampa, Florida, recognized for her achievements in entrepreneurship and advocacy.
