= Thelma Dale Perkins =

Thelma Dale Perkins (October 23, 1915 – September 29, 2014) was an African-American activist. Her maternal uncle was Frederick Douglass Patterson. She was also a member of the CPUSA.

She joined the Alpha Kappa Alpha sorority, the Liberal Club (an African-American integration group), the Southern Negro Youth Congress, and the American Youth Congress. As a member of the American Youth Congress she went to the White House for "chats" sponsored by First Lady Eleanor Roosevelt to discuss the issues facing young people. She graduated from Howard University in 1936. She worked for E. Franklin Frasier on a National Youth Administration Fellowship. She later worked for the government but resigned, instead becoming National Secretary of the National Negro Congress. In 1945 she attended the founding meeting of the Women's International Democratic Federation, held in Paris.

She was friends with Paul Robeson and his wife Eslanda Robeson, and worked as managing editor for Paul's Freedom newspaper, and was involved in a campaign to get his passport restored. She wrote a tribute to Paul Robeson in the book Paul Robeson: The Great Forerunner (1998), by the editors of Freedomways. She was a manager of community relations for CIBA-GEIGY Corporation, where she initiated and developed the "Exceptional Black Scientist" series, which was nationally recognized.

She married Lawrence Rickman Perkins Jr., in 1957, and adopted two children, Lawrence and Patrice.
