= Frederick D. Patterson =

American academic (1901–1988)

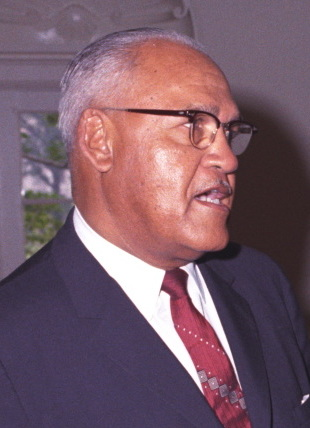
- Patterson in 1964

3rd President of Tuskegee Institute
- In office 1935–1953
- Preceded by: Robert R. Moton
- Succeeded by: Luther H. Foster

Personal details
- Born: October 10, 1901 Washington, D.C., U.S.
- Died: April 26, 1988 (aged 86)
- Relations: Thelma Dale Perkins (niece)
- Education: Prairie View Normal and Industrial Institute (BA), Iowa State College (DVM), Cornell University (PhD)

Frederick Douglass Patterson (October 10, 1901 – April 26, 1988) was an American academic administrator, teacher, and university president. He was the president of Tuskegee Institute (now Tuskegee University; 1935–1953), and founder of the United Negro College Fund (1944, UNCF). He was a 1987 recipient of the Presidential Medal of Freedom, the nation's highest civilian honor, and 1988 recipient of the Spingarn Medal from the NAACP.

== Early life and family ==
Patterson was born on October 10, 1901, in Washington, D.C., to Mamie Lucille and William Ross Patterson. He was named after the great abolitionist and D.C. resident Frederick Douglass. Patterson was orphaned by the age of two when both of his parents died from tuberculosis. He then moved in with his sister Bessie, his primary caregiver, who sacrificed to ensure him a good education. She dedicated nearly half her $20 monthly salary to enroll him in the private elementary school of Samuel Huston College (currently Huston-Tillotson University). Thelma Dale Perkins, born in 1915, was a niece of his.

== Early career ==
By the age of 31, Patterson had attained three educational degrees: a Doctorate degree of Veterinary Medicine and Master of Science degree from Iowa State University (ISU), and a Doctorate of Philosophy from Cornell University.

He studied in the Agriculture Department at the Prairie View Normal and Industrial Institute (now Prairie View A&M University) in Texas, where he first became interested in veterinary medicine. Later, he enrolled at Iowa State College (now Iowa State University) in the College of Veterinary Medicine, where he graduated with a Doctor of Veterinary Medicine in 1923 and a Master of Science in 1927. Patterson was a member of Alpha Phi Alpha fraternity.

His journey to academic accomplishment was not without its roadblocks. He was the only African American working at the Iowa State College veterinary clinic, where he learned important personal lessons about race and society. In his autobiography, reflecting on the experiences, he writes, "I learned a lesson with regard to race that I never forgot: how people feel about you reflects the way you permit yourself to be treated. If you permit yourself to be treated differently, you are condemned to an unequal relationship." Furthermore, he had to maintain employment while studying because he had no other source of income (other than what his sister Bessie could give him), working at both a sorority house and a hotel.

He earned a Doctorate of Philosophy in 1932 in Veterinary Pathology from Cornell University, where he was inducted to Phi Kappa Phi Honor Society.

== Professional career ==
Patterson taught veterinary medicine for four years at Virginia State College while serving as the director of the Department of Agriculture. From there, he became head of the Veterinary Division, then the director of the School of Agriculture at the Tuskegee Institute. While director of the Veterinary Division, the program attracted even white students due to its prestige, a rare occurrence for an HBCU in the segregated South.

In 1935, at the young age of 33, he had distinguished himself enough to be named the third President of Tuskegee Institute.

At Tuskegee Institute (between 1935–1953), President Patterson was responsible for transforming the Institute into a full-fledged university with graduate programs that exist to this day. Over the course of his Presidency he founded the School of Veterinary Medicine, the Commercial Dietetics program, and spearheaded the University's engineering and commercial aviation programs. All of these programs uniquely situated African Americans and Tuskegee University in a position where they could provide highly skilled interns for prestigious internships in emerging fields.

== Legacy ==
In 1944, he founded two institutions which would largely shape his overall legacy: the School of Veterinary Medicine at Tuskegee University which has graduated approximately 75 percent of the United States' black veterinarians, and the United Negro College Fund (UNCF) which administers 37 private historically black colleges and universities throughout the United States and administers 10,000 scholarships every year. Today, UNCF has raised over $3.6 billion since its inception in 1944.

Patterson's leadership won him national recognition and earned him an invitation to serve on President Harry S. Truman's President's Commission on Higher Education from 1946-47. This commission called for an important shift in American college education away from European concepts, and towards equality of opportunity. Important developments flowing historically from this Commission's report were the development of the community college network and the Title III of the Higher Education Act of 1965.

Patterson eventually became a director of the Phelps Stokes Fund from 1958-1969 where he worked to improve education for youth of all disadvantaged backgrounds. He also founded the nonprofit Robert R. Moton Memorial Institute to improve the recruitment and management processes of HBCUs.

Patterson received the Presidential Medal of Freedom from President Ronald Reagan on June 23, 1987, in recognition of his lifetime of leadership and success in the educational field. He received a Candace Award from the National Coalition of 100 Black Women in 1986.

In honor of the impact Patterson had on college education, especially in the African American community, UNCF established the Frederick D. Patterson Research Institute (FDPRI) in 1996.

Iowa State University College of Veterinary Medicine, his alma mater, has created two scholarships in his honor celebrating diversity and inclusion.

His remains are buried at Tuskegee University's campus.
