= Like One of the Family =

1956 book by Alice Childress

First edition

Like One of the Family is a novel by Alice Childress. It was originally published in 1956 by Independence Publishers in Brooklyn, New York. It was re-published by Beacon Press in Boston in 1986.

== Form ==
Each chapter, 62 in all, is told from the perspective of Mildred, a domestic worker in New York City, to her friend Marge, also a domestic worker. The chapters originally appeared with the title "Conversation from Life" in the Black Marxist newspaper Freedom (founded by Paul Robeson), and later were published in the Baltimore Afro-American.

== Reception ==
Literary scholar Trudier Harris notes that, in creating Mildred, "Childress may have been influenced by Langston Hughes's Jesse B. Simple... a gregarious, beer-loving, bar-hopping Harlemite who shared his adventures in the white world and his homely philosophies."

== Plot summary ==
Chapter title	Summary
Like One of the Family	Mrs. C. has a friend over while Mildred is working for her and makes a point of praising her, exaggerating the point that she does not think of Mildred as a servant. Once her friend leaves, Mildred confronts Mrs. C., explaining that she is a servant, not a member of the family.
Listen for the Music	While at work, Mildred overhears Frankie ask his mother where music came from. When she cannot satisfy his curiosity, she passes the storytelling off to Mildred, who explains that music has always existed. It originated in nature, then spread to people, bubbling up inside of them, until finally song was created. Frankie comes to understand that music is still organic, and his mother coaxes Mildred into telling another story.
On Saying No	Mildred invites Susie and her husband over, who brings a couple with them. The couple tells off-colored jokes and brag about the extravagances of their lives, all the while silently critiquing Mildred's home. The couple insists that Mildred needs to visit their Long Island house, which she continues to put off even weeks afterward, finally telling the couple she simply doesn't want to visit.
Ridin' the Bus	Mildred explains that she likes sitting in the back of the bus, even though she is no longer bound by Jim Crow laws or by custom to do so. She tells Marge that whites and blacks are able to sit next to each other without bothering the other.
Buyin' Presents	Mildred ponders the best way to spend five dollars on Angie and her family, and finally decides that buying food for them is the most practical gift.
If You Want to Get Along With Me	Mrs. M. is highly inquisitive of Mildred during her time working for her. While she appreciates how nice she is to her, Mildred grows irritated by Mrs. M. and confronts her. Their relationship is strained for a short while, until Mildred requests that Mrs. M. treat her the same as she would treat anybody, rather than be treated special.
Got to Go Someplace	One of Mildred's more somber stories, she relates how she was out for a picnic and while she and her friends were having fun in the car, a bunch of cars drove past waving Confederate flags, singing "Dixie", and aggressively harassing the revelers. Mildred sadly muses how white folks can kill black folks anytime they like and get away with it, but not the other way around. She and her friends tried to make the most of the picnic, but a pall was cast over the entire proceedings by the hateful displays of racism and ignorance. In a very matter-of-fact manner, Mildred defiantly vows to keep living her life because everyone's got a right as a human being to go somewhere... sometime.
"The Pocketbook Game"	Mildred relates how she'd been working for Mrs. E and how Mrs. E would clutch her pocketbook to her whenever Mildred was around. Mildred quietly waited a few months until she could show Mrs. E how it was silly to mistrust her, and upon leaving to fetch the super one day, she rushed back to breathlessly exclaim that she'd left her pocketbook. Later, Mrs. E tried to explain that it wasn't that she mistrusted Mildred, but Mildred cut her off by wryly saying that she understood because anyone who paid as little as Mrs. E did should probably hold onto her pocketbook! This highlights how silly it is to distrust people due to insulting and misguided preconceived notions.
New York's My Home	Mildred's friend, Mamie, is in town for a whirlwind tour of New York City where she tries to cram an entire city's worth of experiences into two weeks' vacation. She drags Mildred around with her and then haughtily proclaims that she could never live there. Mildred takes offense to that, since she hears that all the time, and she feels that it's because people visiting don't see the real New York City when they're too intent on seeing everything in such a short amount of time. The next visitor Mildred has, she vows to show her version of New York, composed of the smaller moments and real people that make it so special.
All About My Job	Mildred uses wit and humor to give the history and importance of the domestic worker. She teaches how the profession has been a big part of keeping African Americans employed during the post-slavery and Jim Crow era. She teaches this lesson to a fellow domestic worker who is ashamed of revealing what she does while in the company of middle class African Americans.
Bubba	Mildred and her sister Florence are faced with the dilemma of supporting Bubba's decision to go South and join the Civil Rights Movement. Bubba points out all of the injustices facing African Americans under Jim Crow laws and the need to join the movement. Mildred and Florence are afraid for his safety, but Mildred agrees with Bubba and convinces Florence that it's the right thing to do.
The Health Card	Mildred's boss asks her to produce a health card, insinuating that she may not be free and clean of diseases because she is from Harlem. Mildred uses a bit of reverse psychology by agreeing, but asking to see health cards for the entire family of her boss's household since she has to handle their dirty laundry. Mildred's boss quickly withdraws her request.
"Your Soul ... Another You"	Mildred explains to Marge what a soul is and what it does and does not do for a person.
Signs of the Times	Mildred tells Marge that she has found something that she would be very good at: writing signs that would be displayed on buses and subways. Mildred says that the writers of the signs "just don't get it", even though they're trying to create racial harmony. She believes she would be better at it because she has experienced racial struggles first hand.
Aren't You Happy?	Mildred tells Marge the story of her cousin Ellie leaving her job. Ellie's employer didn't understand why she was quitting, because she thought Ellie considered herself a part of one big happy family, despite Ellie's attempts at explaining herself. Ellie blames the misunderstanding on the fact that the woman had read Gone with the Wind four times and it had "just given her ideas."
Nasty Compliments	Mildred and Marge agree they do not like the nearby butcher shop. The owner always has something to say that is less than pleasant. He fails to realize that, regardless of race and skin color, all his customers should be treated with the same respect. Mildred gets fed up and gives him a piece of her mind that she hopes will straighten him out for good.
Old as the Hills	Mildred goes shopping and finds herself feuding with another customer; her response to the stranger was cruel as she attacked the woman about her age. Mildred finds herself in the same shoes as she too is attacked about her age by two much younger women. After a careful evaluation of what happened she realizes that age is not just a number: it's a social issue that would take the world's combined effort to resolve.
Mrs. James	Mildred tells Marge about the woman she's working for named Mrs. James, who always refers to herself in third person. Mildred soon catches on and realizes why she does it. When Mrs. James tells her she needs her to work on Saturday, she does not hesitate to tell her that "Mildred does not work on Saturdays."
Hands	The intricate processes of how the working class built everything. Marge is self-conscious about the way her hands look. Mildred explains to Marge how working class hands like hers build chairs and tables and houses and buildings.
All the Things We Are	Mildred had a little extra money saved up and decided to weigh her options on what to buy for herself. She was leaning towards beauty products but they were expensive, and too broad a selection. She discussed all the different things she would have to do and get to become a refined lady. After agonizing over all the tempting beauty advertisements, she decided to save the money for another day.
I Liked Workin' at That Place ...	Mildred tells Marge about a lady she worked for who was very kind to her. She describes how they worked alongside each other sometimes, and how the woman spoke to her as though they were equals – and not employer to employee. The lady was fair and upfront as far as her expectations from Mildred were concerned. She bought thoughtful gifts for Mildred and gave her reasonable downtime. Mildred was sorry the woman moved away.
Good Reason for a Good Time	Mildred tells Marge about her visit with Jim and Mabel. She tells about how much fun she had talking about creating a club that has teas, cocktail parties, beach parties and dinners, as well as spending the treasury money on colored writers and giving money to organizations instead of free formal dances. Mildred doesn't know why the people that she works for are always complaining about being bored; there are so many things to do!
I Go to a Funeral	Mildred tells Marge about her time spent at Mitchell's funeral. Mildred has a few problems with the obituary and the way Mitchell is dressed. She feels that he is not being represented as he was in life, and feels that Mitchell died of discouragement, not a heart attack. Mildred feels bad about the whole situation is because Mitchell could have had a nice shop for the cost of that funeral.
Weekend with Pearl	Mildred tells Marge about her weekend with her friend Pearl and her husband, Leo. They spent time watching political speeches on the television, and weren't pleased with the politicians tip-toeing around the Jim Crow laws. Instead, they would say "race situation", "problem", or "tensions". These speeches fire up Mildred, and when returning to work on Monday for Mrs. J., she gives her boss a sassy attitude about taking a week off.
More Blessed to Give ...	Mildred takes a child, Barbara, to a party for "underprivileged" children. While at the party, Mildred teaches one of the organizers a lesson in giving and receiving after they refuse a gift from Barbara. Mildred realizes how important it is to Barbara to give rather than receive and vows to make sure that the other children are able to give, and not just receive, at next years party.
Sometimes I Feel So Sorry	Mildred talks about how the worries of her employer, Mrs. B., seem to be trivial compared to the problems that Mildred and her family and friends face each day. She concludes that, while Mrs. B's problems may seem too big to her, if Mildred had the same problems she would not be worried about them and that her family would think her foolish if she was.
I Go to Church	After a long absence Mildred attends church. When the pastor questions her absence she tells him the truth as to why she has not been attending in an effort to make him change the message of the sermons he preaches.
I Hate Half-Days Off	Mildred goes to an interview for a full-time job with a highly structured schedule. She turns it down when she learns that the pay is on the first and fifteenth of the month based on two weeks' worth of work, wherein she loses pay for the uncovered days of the month.
What Does Africa Want? ... Freedom!	Mildred attends an African American meeting, where African-styled art is displayed alongside native photography. The attendees discuss what Africa wants from the world, and Mildred explains that the country wants freedom.
I Wish I Was a Poet	While visiting a cousin at a hotel, Mildred witnesses an elderly, obviously in love white couple checking into a cheap room with only a single plastic bag of luggage. Before going to their room, the woman smells the flowers off a desk. Mildred does not feel that her depiction of them does the scene justice.
Economy Corner	Mildred opts to watch a new show instead of the usual "Gory Story". A cooking program demonstrates how to use leftovers to craft a whole new meal by, in effect, making an entirely new meal and garnishing it with the leftover in question.
In the Laundry Room	Mildred takes Mrs. M.'s laundry to the wash. Another domestic worker snatches her laundry away from where Mildred sits, and Mildred scolds her behavior, thereby winning her friendship.
I Could Run a School Too	Mildred believes she could run an acting school because she understands the way theater works: the leading man is always dashing, even after a fight, and the leading woman is always a helpless damsel.
I Visit Yesterday	Mildred coaxes a family friend, Jeanie, into talking about her past: her mother never saw a full box of groceries; her family never had beds; and slaves were raped. Despite this, Jeanie sees good things happening in the present, and predicts better for the future.
Story Tellin' Time	Mrs. B. inquires as to whether Mildred goes to see trouble-rousing performers such as Paul Robeson perform. Mildred turns the conversation toward who the real trouble-causers are.
About Those Colored Movies	Mildred fumes over white actors being cast as fair-skinned African American in movies, whereas African Americans are delegated to stereotypical roles, such as house maids. She claims that people who have never met an African American would be shocked to find out that their personalities could be anything besides courteous. Mildred ends by remembering the "nice plays" she has seen, including plays of the Federal Theatre Project, which showcased the talent of African American performers in a way that films do not.
Why Should I Get Upset?	A drunken African American spurs Mildred's friend Berniece into wanting to take a different bus because she is ashamed of him. Mildred tells her that it's ridiculous to take one man's actions as a reason to be ashamed, especially when there are drunks in every nationality.
Inhibitions	The son of one of Mildred's employers is an absolute wild child, whose mother believes that he should not be inhibited in any way. Mildred explains to her why he should be taught to act within boundaries.
What is It All About?	Mildred and Nellie are frustrated over the fact that people's hearts are in the wrong places.
We Need a Union Too	Mildred hypothesizes that the creation of a union would take a ridiculous load off domestic workers' shoulders.
Pretty Sights and Good Feelin's	After overhearing nonchalant conversations about the different travels that some women at a luncheon were discussing, Mildred realizes that compared to her, they don't fully appreciate the beauty of what the world offers and the good feeling it brings when you can recognize it.
Dope and Things Like That	Mildred is trying to figure out what causes people, especially children under the age of thirteen, to turn to dope. She is sincerely concerned and feels that this issue should be addressed by the "big people" who make all the big decisions.
Merry Christmas, Marge!	Since the word "peace" is used so much especially during the Christmas season, Mildred thinks really hard about what exactly is the meaning of peace. She shares with Marge what peace means to her and what it would look like everywhere.
On Leavin' Notes!	Mildred comes up with her New Year's resolution and sticks to it by not letting her employers use her.
The 'Many Others' in History	Mildred attends a Negro History meeting and notices that many others are not receiving their recognition. She makes a point to voice this. She felt it was important that they all know that there are people behind the scenes that helped those who are in the spotlight.
Interestin' and Amusin'	At a house party that she is employed to work through, a man tries to single out Mildred by asking why she wants peace. Mildred silences the room by elaborating on the alternative option.
A New Kind of Prayer	While visiting with her sister, Mildred sends Marge a letter describing how she led her church in prayer. She asked for the ending of the Ku Klux Klan, as well as the cessation of the misuse of God's gifts and name.
History in the Makin'	African Americans make headline news when they get a job because they are considered to be representing their race. Mildred does not understand how the same standard is not upheld for whites, who are simply seen as working rather than figure-heading their race.
Dance With Me, Henry	Mildred purchases an expensive new dress and goes to a party, where she waits for someone to ask her to dance. The men eye all the women up like they are prizes. At last, Mildred grows frustrated with the lack of courtesy toward the less-attractive women and leaves.
Ain't You Mad?	Mr. and Mrs. B. read an article about a girl who is trying to get into college and express their sympathies over the ordeal. Mildred explodes in response, because the B's are courageous enough to will for change only behind closed doors, whereas, as privileged whites, they have the power to make a change, and yet they don't.
Discontent	Mildred once again proves that she can say nearly anything and get away with it. After listening to a ladder speaker, Mildred and a stranger leave for their individual homes. The woman expresses her views that if the speaker is so dissatisfied with his current life, he should leave for somewhere that would please him. Mildred tells of how dissatisfaction has shaped the present.
Northerners Can Be So Smug	Mildred attends another meeting, this time one that crucifies the South for its enduring racism. Mildred calls attention to the thousands of southerners who do not take part in anti-African American organizations or actions. She once again tells of how she wants her rights not only in the South, but everywhere.
Let's Face It	Mr. and Mrs. M. host company from Alabama, though they fear that the couple might speak racially in the presence of Mildred. At length, "Billy Alabama" and Mildred confront one another and converse: Billy Alabama neglects to respect Mildred and simultaneously tries to prove that he is not racist, ultimately proving that he is a pretentious bigot.
If Heaven is What We Want	Mildred speculates how everybody should be able to pick the section of Heaven they spend eternity in, whether they are segregated by religion or else Hitler-led white supremacist quarters.
Where is the Speakin' Place?	Mildred questions why famous people who have some measure of influence in society do not try to do something to change the world.
Missionaries	Mildred illustrates a radio program she heard, where the host preached of how India needs to be saved, in the light of how there are plenty of people that need saving in America, as well as problems that need fixing.
So Much for Nothing	Mildred convinces Marge to watch an infomercial that is trying to sell dishes, sweetening a low sale price by adding the sale of additional items to the dish set.
The Benevolent Club	Mildred wants to start a benefit club for African Americans to support families who have faced difficulties within society. The club nearly falls apart before it even gets started when Mildred states that she wants non-African American people be welcomed into the society and is faced with resistance.
All About Miss Tubman	Mildred offers up Marge's apartment for a children's affair, where she sits the kids down to tell them a story about Harriet Tubman. She tells of her work with the Underground Railroad and is shocked to find that the children know nothing of African American historical heroes.
The ABC's of Life and Learning	Mildred ponders over the bravery of children who walk to and from school.
Somehow I'd Like to Thank Them	Mildred recalls a small article she saw about white women in South Africa who silently protested a law that made it illegal for colored people to vote there. She praises them for having taken action, though she does not consider them particularly brave or extraordinary.
Men in Your Life	Mildred discusses raising a boy to be a decent man. She recalls going to visit Tessie and remembers how grouchy her husband Clarence was. She tells of dating Wallace, and describes him as cheap with his money. She concludes by saying that Eddie is the perfect man for her, and she would rather marry him and be broke and happy than either Clarence or Wallace and be well-off.
