= Alice Childress =

American novelist, playwright, and actress (1916–1994)

- Born: Alice Herndon; October 12, 1916; Charleston, South Carolina, U.S.
- Died: August 14, 1994 (aged 77); New York City, U.S.
- Other name: Louise Henderson
- Occupations: Playwright; novelist; actress
- Notable work: Like One of the Family (1956); A Hero Ain't Nothin' but a Sandwich (1973)
- Spouses: Alvin Childress (m. 1934; div. 1957): Nathan Woodard

Alice Childress (October 12, 1916 – August 14, 1994) was an American novelist, playwright, and actress, acknowledged as "the only African-American woman to have written, produced, and published plays for four decades." Childress described her work as trying to portray the have-nots in a have society, saying: "My writing attempts to interpret the 'ordinary' because they are not ordinary. Each human is uniquely different. Like snowflakes, the human pattern is never cast twice. We are uncommonly and marvellously intricate in thought and action, our problems are most complex and, too often, silently borne." Childress became involved in social causes, and formed an off-Broadway union for actors.

Alice Childress's paper archive is held at the Schomburg Center for Research in Black Culture in Harlem, New York.

== Early years ==
Childress (née Herndon) was born in Charleston, South Carolina, but at the age of nine, after her parents separated, she moved to Harlem, New York City, where she lived with her grandmother, Eliza Campbell White, on 118th Street, between Lenox Avenue and Fifth Avenue. Though her grandmother was the daughter of a slave and had no formal education, she encouraged Alice to pursue her talents in reading and writing. Alice attended public school in New York for her middle-school education and went on to Wadleigh High School, but had to drop out once her grandmother died. She became involved in theater immediately after her high school and she did not attend college.

== Career ==
=== Acting ===
Childress took odd jobs to pay for herself, including domestic worker, photo retoucher, assistant machinist, saleslady, and insurance agent. In 1939, she studied Drama in the American Negro Theatre (ANT), and performed for the company for 11 years. She acted in Abram Hill and John Silvera's On Strivers Row (1940), Theodore Brown's Natural Man (1941), and Philip Yordan's Anna Lucasta (1944). There she won acclaim as an actress in numerous other productions, and moved to Broadway with the transfer of ANT's hit Anna Lucasta, which became the longest-running all-black play in Broadway history among a cast that also included Hilda Simms, Canada Lee, Georgia Burke, Earle Hyman and Frederick O'Neal. Though many biographies list her as having received a Tony Award nomination for her starring performance, this information appears to be inaccurate as the Tony Awards did not begin until 1947, some years after the production.

=== Playwriting ===
In 1949, she began her writing career with the one-act play Florence, which she directed and starred in, and which reflected many of the themes that are characteristic of her later writing, including the empowerment of black women, interracial politics, and working-class life. In Florence, a black, Southern, working-class woman, Mama Whitney, decides to travel by train from South Carolina to New York City to retrieve her daughter, Florence, who is a struggling actor. However, after a white woman waiting for the same train offers to help Florence by recommending her for a job as a maid, Mama Whitney decides to send her daughter money instead bringing her home. Childress' goal in writing Florence was to "settle an argument with fellow actors (Sidney Poitier among others) who said that in a play about Negroes and whites, only a 'life and death thing' like lynching is interesting on stage."

Her 1950 play, Just a Little Simple, was adapted from the Langston Hughes novel Simple Speaks His Mind and was produced in Harlem at the Club Baron Theatre. Her next play, Gold Through the Trees (1952), gave her the distinction of being one of the first African-American women to have worked professionally produced on the New York stage. The success of these plays enabled her to bring Harlem's first all-union off-Broadway contracts into practice.

Childress's first full-length, dramatic play, Trouble in Mind was produced at Stella Holt's Greenwich Mews Theatre in 1955 and ran for 91 performances. Biographies and her 1994 obituary claim that Trouble in Mind won an Obie award for the best off-Broadway play of the 1955–56 season, which would have made Childress the first African-American woman to be awarded the honor. However, Trouble in Mind is not in the American Theatre Wing's records as having won an Obie for the 1955–56 season. Trouble in Mind is about racism in the theater world. In a play-within-a-play, Childress depicts the frustrations of black actors and actresses in mainstream white theater. The show's success led to plans for a Broadway transfer, but these plans were nixed when Childress refused to change the play's ending. Had it opened, it would have been the first play by an African-American woman to open on Broadway (a title taken by A Raisin in the Sun four years later). An acclaimed revival of Trouble in Mind was presented on Broadway from October 29, 2021, to January 9, 2022, at Roundabout Theatre Company's American Airlines Theatre. It starred LaChanze, Chuck Cooper, Michael Zegen, Danielle Campbell, Jessica Frances Dukes, Brandon Micheal Hall, Don Stephenson, Alex Mickiewicz, and Simon Jones and was directed by Charles Randolph-Wright. The production was nominated for four Tony Awards including Best Revival of a Play, Best Actress in a Play (LaChanze), Best Featured Actor in a Play (Chuck Cooper), and Best Costume Design in a Play (Emilio Sosa).

She completed her next dramatic work, Wedding Band: A Love/Hate Story in Black and White, in 1962. Its setting is South Carolina during World War I and deals with a forbidden interracial love affair. Due to the scandalous nature of the show and the stark realism it presented, it was impossible for Childress to persuade any theatre in New York to stage it. The show premiered in 1966 at the University of Michigan in Ann Arbor, and was also produced in Chicago. It was not until 1972 that it played in New York at the New York Shakespeare Festival, starring Ruby Dee. It was later filmed and shown on TV, but many stations refused to screen it. A production was staged at Theatre for a New Audience from April 23 to May 15, 2022, directed by Awoye Timpo and featuring Thomas Sadoski and Veanne Cox. In the summer of 2023, it was produced at the Stratford Shakespeare Festival, starring Antonette Rudder and Cyrus Lane, directed by Sam White.

In 1965, Childress was featured in the BBC presentation The Negro in the American Theatre. From 1966 to 1968, she was a scholar-in-residence at the Radcliffe Institute for Advanced Study, Harvard University.

In conjunction with her composer husband, Nathan Woodard, she wrote musical plays, including Young Martin Luther King (originally entitled The Freedom Drum) in 1968 and Sea Island Song (1977).

=== Newspaper columns ===
Childress published more than thirty columns in the Paul Robeson-associated newspaper, Freedom. The tabloid monthly ran from 1950 through 1955, and in 1956 she published a collection of them in her novel Like One of the Family. The ones in the book are not always identical with the originals in the newspaper, as the latter often explored a theme discussed elsewhere in the issue. As an example of Childress's approach here, when the unconsciously racist employer asks for a health card from the book's protagonist Mildred, a Black domestic worker, Mildred pretends to be relieved, saying she had wondered how to ask for their own health cards from the family whose laundry she handles and whose beds she makes. The embarrassed employer backs off.

Also in association with Freedom, in 1952 Childress collaborated with Lorraine Hansberry, who had recently relocated to New York City and begun working at the paper. They co-wrote a pageant for Freedom's Negro History Festival, with Harry Belafonte, Sidney Poitier, Douglas Turner Ward and John O. Killens providing narration. Childress, sixteen years older than Hansberry, introduced the latter to the Black theatrical community of New York. This was Hansberry's earliest surviving theatrical work.

=== Young adult books ===
Alice Childress is also known for her young adult novels, among which are Those Other People (1989) and A Hero Ain't Nothin' but a Sandwich (1973). She adapted the latter as a screenplay for the 1977 feature film also entitled A Hero Ain't Nothin' but a Sandwich, starring Cicely Tyson and Paul Winfield.

== Personal life ==
She had used the names Louise Henderson and Alice Herndon before her marriage in 1934 to actor Alvin Childress. The couple had a daughter together, Jean R. Childress, and divorced in 1957, when musician Nathan Woodard became her second husband.

She died of cancer, aged 77, at Astoria General Hospital in Queens, New York. At the time of her death, she was working on a story about her African great-grandmother, Ani-Campbell, who had been a slave, and her Scots-Irish great-grandmother.

== Awards ==
- Off-Broadway Magazine (Trouble in Mind), 1956
- ALA Best Young Adult Book of 1975 (for A Hero Ain't Nothin' but a Sandwich)
- Lewis Carroll Shelf Award (for A Hero Ain't Nothin' but a Sandwich)
- Jane Addams Children's Book Honor for a young adult novel (for A Hero Ain't Nothin' but a Sandwich)
- Paul Robeson Award for Outstanding Contributions to the Performing Arts, 1980
- Honorable Mention, Coretta Scott King Award, 1982
- What a Girl, 1985
- Drama Desk Award – Harold S. Prince Lifetime Achievement Award, 2022 (posthumous)

== Major works ==
=== Plays ===
- Florence (1949)
- Just a Little Simple (1950)
- Gold Through the Trees (1952)
- Trouble in Mind (1955)
- Wedding Band: A Love/Hate Story in Black and White (1966)
- The Freedom Dream, later retitled Young Martin Luther King, Jr. (1968)
- String (1969)
- Wine in the Wilderness (1969)
- Mojo: A Black Love Story (1970)
- When the Rattlesnake Sounds (1975)
- Let's Hear It for the Queen (1976)
- Sea Island Song, later retitled Gullah (1977)
- Moms: A Praise Play for a Black Comedienne (1987)

=== Novels ===
- Like One of the Family (1956)
- A Hero Ain't Nothin' but a Sandwich (1973), which became a film of the same title in 1977.
- A Short Walk (1979)
- Rainbow Jordan (1981)
- Those Other People (1989)

== Trivia ==
The song "Alice Childress" by the Ben Folds Five is not related to her. It is a coincidence that there was a woman with the same name who poured water on Ben Folds' wife at the time, Anna Goodman.

Childress was a member of Sigma Gamma Rho sorority.
