= A Hero Ain't Nothin' but a Sandwich (novel) =

1973 young adult novel by Alice Childress

- Author: Alice Childress
- Language: English
- Genre: Young adult
- Publisher: Coward, McCann & Geoghegan
- Publication date: 1973
- Publication place: United States
- Media type: Print (Hardcover)
- Pages: 126 pp
- ISBN: 0-698-20278-3
- OCLC: 797036
- LC Class: PZ7.C4412 He

A Hero Ain't Nothin' but a Sandwich is a 1973 young adult novel by American author Alice Childress. Set in the American ghettos of Harlem, the novel tells the story of a teenage boy who struggles with the abandonment instilled by his biological father. In order to feel wanted and a sense of euphoria in his dysfunctional life, he turns to drugs, becoming a product of his environment.

== Plot summary ==
The novel is told from the perspective of several characters, centered around protagonist Benjie Johnson, a 13-year-old living in the urban ghetto of Harlem in the 1970s, who succumbs to the allure of heroin. He lives with his mother, grandmother, and stepfather. Benjie's biological parents are separated, leaving Benjie with emotional abandonment and his mom, Rose, with the difficult task of raising a young Black man on her own. Despite the help of Benjie's grandmother, the need for a male figure is evident. At first, Benjie's mother is not aware of Benjie's addiction. However, her motherly intuitions sensed that something was wrong with her son.

Benjie possesses great potential, but he takes a drastic turn when he starts experimenting with drugs. Once encouraged by his friends, he gradually becomes addicted to heroin and tries to conceal the severity of his habits from those who care about him. Benjie battles internally during his addiction, as he puts on a façade of control over his life.

As the intensity of Benjie's addiction increases comes the unpredictability of his behavior. He starts stealing from his family in order to feed his addiction. His actions lead to the straining of relationships with his support system. His erratic behavior also leads to his stepfather, Butler, moving out. The decision is tricky for Butler, as he loves Benjie's mom dearly. However, he can no longer live complacent with Benjie's actions.

Benjie's addiction becomes so severe that he goes to school while intoxicated. He longs to attain euphoria in a dysfunctional environment. To save Benjie from becoming a product of his environment, one of his teachers, Nigeria Greene, turns him into the principal in hopes of Benjie receiving medical care, leading to Benjie's disdain towards him. The potential of Benjie is ever present to Nigeria. However, those around Benjie become complacent to the constant behaviors around them.

In an even further attempt to save Benjie, as a final resort, his mother goes to a root doctor in hopes of having her son cured of his addictions. Despite the "potion" provided by the root doctor, Benjie still has the mindset of addiction.

One night, Benjie sneaks into the apartment that his stepfather, Butler, had been staying in after his erratic behavior became unbearable. Butler suspects that it is Benjie, startling him. Benjie runs to the roof, where he has a near-death experience, and the only one who can save him is Butler. Benjie is saved, and the once unpleasant relationship between the two halts. This final confrontation with his stepfather leads to his promise to quit drugs.

Butler moves back in with Benjie and his family, becoming the male role model Benjie needs and desires. The rapport between Benjie and Butler increases substantially; now Butler can express his concerns and worries, and Benjie accepts. The two come up with a plan to meet each other at Benjie's therapy section. Butler arrives and patiently waits for Benjie, as it appears that Benjie is maturing. However, the novel ends on an ambiguous note.

== Major themes ==
=== Addiction ===
Addiction is a core theme in the novel. Author Alice Childress depicts a deep exploration of the theme of addiction, specifically in the American ghettos of Harlem. The novel showcases the realistic and complex circumstances of the protagonist, Benjie Johnson. The theme of addiction, seen from several perspectives throughout the novel, highlights the adverse consequences associated with addiction. Childress indirectly addresses the theme of addiction as being considered an issue that is not caused solely by one's financial situation, environment, or oppression; instead, addiction is caused by a lack of social support and a need for systemic change.

=== Heroism ===
The conventional definition of heroism is challenged and questioned concerning the modern-day definition of hero. The theme is present throughout the novel and is questioned by protagonist Benjie, as he does not believe heroism to be attainable. The novel's title, A Hero Ain't Nothin but a Sandwich, is how Benjie views a hero. He believes a hero only provides temporary satisfaction, as a sandwich does, especially in his environment. Concerning Benjie's perception of a hero, the novel also depicts characters like Nigeria Greene and Butler Craig, who exemplify heroes. Both characters see Benjie's potential despite his flawed behavior and try to help him overcome his addiction. The theme of heroism in the novel also portrays the realistic flaws some heroes possess through their willingness to help those around them.

== Major characters ==
=== Benjie Johnson ===
Benjie Johnson, the protagonist of the novel, is a thirteen-year-old heroin addict. He lives in an urban ghetto setting in Harlem, NY. His father has abandoned him and his mother. In his attempt to cope with his father's abandonment, he hangs around the wrong crowd, which incites his heroin addiction. He does not perceive himself as an addict, as he feels he could stop at any time. He is harsh towards those who try to help him feel understood and wanted.

=== Rose Johnson (Craig) ===
Rose Johnson (Craig) is the single mother of the protagonist, Benjie Johnson. She works odd jobs to support herself, Benjie, and her mother. She tries hard to fill the vacant role of Benjie's father, but her continuous attempts fail. Her character is resilient yet defined by the stereotypes of single Black mothers.

=== Mrs. Ransom Bell ===
Mrs. Ransom Bell is the mother of Rose Johnson (Craig) and grandmother of Benjie Johnson. She is portrayed as a religious woman with strong faith. Her immense faith comes off as overwhelming to those around her.

=== Butler Craig ===
Butler Craig is the spouse of Rose Johnson (Craig) and Benjie Johnson's, stepfather. He loves Rose dearly but struggles with accepting the behavior of her son Benjie. His love for Rose aids in his attempt to form a father-son bond with Benjie. He strives to be the male figure Benjie's heart desires. His once distant relationship with Benjie shifts when he saves his life.

=== Jimmy-Lee Powell ===
Jimmy-Lee Powell is Benjie's best friend. His relationship with Benjie becomes estranged as Benjie's drug use increases. Jimmy tries to encourage Benjie to stop his drug use, but Benjie is not accepting of his heartfelt messages. Jimmy feels slightly at fault for Benjie's drug use because he introduced him to his first marijuana high, which he no longer uses, as he wishes to be present in life.

=== Walter ===
Walter is a drug dealer who sells to Benjie and the rest of the community. He attains the name as a "pusher," yet he despises it because he believes that he is not pushing the drugs. Instead, his customers are searching for his services and products, guiding his unapologetic attitude about his way of living.

=== Nigeria Greene ===
Nigeria Greene is one of Benjie's teachers who takes pride in his Blackness. He believes the drug epidemic in the community to be the cause of the ongoing oppression Whites have on the Blacks. He sees firsthand the effects of drugs on his student Benjie. In his attempt to save Benjie from falling further into the trap of addiction, he turns him into the principal for being intoxicated. The teachers around him are noncompliant. However, he wins the fight. Nigeria's actions lead to Benjie's detest of him.

=== Bernard Cohen ===
Bernard Cohen is one of Benjie's teachers. He is one of the few White teachers in his place of employment. He possesses racist ideologies, yet he does not perceive himself as a racist. He has a grievance towards his coworker, Nigeria Greene. He perceives Nigeria's pride in his Blackness as arrogance. Despite his disdain towards Nigeria, he reluctantly decides to help with turning in Benjie.

=== Miss Emma Dudley ===
Emma Dudley is a tenant in the building with Rose, Benjie, and Mrs. Ransom Bell. Emma longs to be loved by a man and often criticizes the men around her for not being able to identify real beauty as a cause of her loneliness. She allows Butler to stay with her after he becomes fed up with Benjie's erratic behavior. Emma lusts over Butler's manliness, making several advances. However, Butler's love for Rose is too strong to accept.

== Awards and nominations ==
A Hero Ain't Nothin' but a Sandwich won an ALA Coretta Scott King Award honor, the Lewis Carroll Shelf Award, and the Jane Addams Award for a young adult novel.

== Reception ==
Ed Bullins in The New York Times commented: "This surprisingly exciting, entertaining book demystifies the pusher and the problem he sells by centering on the unwitting victim, Benjie, and the disintegration of a black family. With their own voices the people in this story tell the truths of their lives. The writer uses her considerable dramatic talents to expose a segment of society seldom spoken of above a whisper; she exposes the urban disease that hides behind the headlines of drug abuse, the child junkies, drug rehabilitation programs and the problem of sheer survival in the black urban community." Kirkus Reviews called the novel "An unusually honest and forceful novel, told in trenchant language by a variety of people concerned with thirteen year-old Benjie."

== Censorship ==
In 1975, the book was removed from high school library shelves by the board of education of the Island Trees Union Free School District in New York. This case became the subject of a U.S. Supreme Court case in 1982.

== Film adaptation ==
The book was adapted into a film in 1977 starring Cicely Tyson and Paul Winfield and directed by Ralph Nelson. Childress faced difficulties having the film published with a PG-13 rating rather than the original R rating.
