= Sheila Fortson =

American journalist

Sheila Fortson (born August 22, 1983) is an American television journalist, radio host, and media/communications specialist. Fortson worked as an entertainment and community affairs reporter for The Lehigh Valley's Service Electric Cable TV 2 News in Bethlehem, Pennsylvania. She hosted the radio show The Ladies Room with Sheila & Shay on WIFI 1460 AM in Burlington, New Jersey. She currently works in public relations and as a freelance television host. To date, she is noted as the only African American on-air reporter to have worked at SECTV in the station's history.

== Biography ==
=== Early life and education ===
Fortson was born in West Philadelphia, Pennsylvania. She graduated from Temple University's School of Journalism.

=== Career ===
While working as a student producer at her university's student-run station, Temple Update, Fortson was mentored by former WTXF-TV Fox 29 Philadelphia anchor Tracey Matisak. After finishing at Temple, Fortson began working as a post-graduate intern at Blue Ridge Cable TV 13 in Lehighton, Pennsylvania. After her internship at TV 13, Fortson was hired as a reporter at SECTV2 News.

During that time, Fortson also worked for the Lehigh Valley, reporting an annual 10-day live coverage of the music festival Musikfest. She has also covered Valley visits from then-presidential candidate Barack Obama, his wife Michelle Obama, high-profile journalists like Larry Kane, and NBC correspondent Lisa Myers. Following her time at SECTV, Fortson opened a women's clothing boutique, Hidden Glam. She freelanced as a host for shows like Food For Thought. She is also the creator and host of 12 Minute Mom.

Fortson currently hosts the Insights Video Edition, an online insurance news program for the National Council on Compensation Insurance (NCCI), in Boca Raton.

== Awards and affiliations ==
Fortson is a member of the National Association of Black Journalists, the National Council of Negro Women, the National Congress of Black Women, and the prestigious African American sororities, Sigma Gamma Rho sorority. She and her husband were featured in the Spring/Summer 2009 issue of the Temple University alumni magazine, the Temple Review.

== Personal life ==
Fortson is married to Muhammed Williams, also a Temple University graduate. Williams works in the IT industry as a software executive and business analyst. Fortson is the cousin of former NBA power forward Danny Fortson and the sister-in-law of former NFL and Arena League football player Jafar Williams. Fortson and her husband have two daughters.
