= Mary Lou Allison Gardner Little =

American educator and sorority founder

- Born: November 2, 1896; Kentucky, U.S.
- Died: March 1992; Los Angeles, California, U.S.
- Occupation: Educator
- Known for: Primary founder and first national president of Sigma Gamma Rho

Mary Lou Allison Gardner Little (November 2, 1896 – March 1992) was an American educator and the primary founder of Sigma Gamma Rho. She served as the sorority's first national president, or Grand Basileus, from 1925 to 1926. Her teaching career began in Indianapolis and continued in the Los Angeles public school system until her retirement in 1967.

== Early life and education ==
Allison was born in Kentucky on November 2, 1896. After losing both parents at approximately three years old, she and her siblings were raised in separate households. She remained in Indianapolis with Katie Johnson, a family friend.

She graduated from Shortridge High School in 1915 and earned a teaching certificate from the Indianapolis Normal School in 1918. She attended Butler University part time from 1919 to 1924. She later completed her undergraduate education at the University of California, Los Angeles.

== Founding of Sigma Gamma Rho ==
In the early 1920s, Allison brought together a group of Black women educators to discuss forming an organization that would support teachers' professional development and serve the wider community. The women met in their homes on weeknights and Saturdays.

On November 12, 1922, Allison invited six fellow educators to a meeting in Indianapolis. With Nannie Mae Gahn, Vivian White, Bessie Downey, Cubena McClure, Hattie Mae Dulin and Dorothy Hanley, she founded Sigma Gamma Rho.

Attorney and civil rights leader Robert Lee Brokenburr served as the organization's legal adviser and filed its incorporation papers in December 1922. The original organization limited membership to schoolteachers and encouraged members to pursue further education and inspire others to do the same.

Allison wrote the sorority's pledge in 1925 and served as its first Grand Basileus from 1925 to 1926. The first national Boulé was held in Indianapolis in December 1925. Members approved changes to the organization's articles of incorporation in 1929 to broaden membership to college women, and Brokenburr filed the amended articles in 1930.

== Teaching career ==
Allison began her career in the Indianapolis Public Schools after completing her teacher training. In 1928, she moved to Los Angeles with her husband and continued her education at UCLA.

She taught in the Los Angeles Unified School District for 35 years, retiring in 1967.

== Death and recognition ==
Little died in Los Angeles in March 1992.

Sigma Gamma Rho's Mary Lou Allison Little Loving Cup Award is named in her honor. It is presented at the sorority's Boulé to its most outstanding chapter.

On May 6, 2022, Butler University posthumously awarded honorary degrees to Little and the sorority's six other founders.
