= A Hero Ain't Nothin' but a Sandwich (film) =

- Directed by: Ralph Nelson
- Screenplay by: Alice Childress
- Based on: A Hero Ain't Nothin' but a Sandwich by Alice Childless
- Produced by: Terry Nelson; Robert B. Radnitz
- Starring: Cicely Tyson; Paul Winfield; Larry B. Scott; David Groh; Helen Martin; Harold Sylvester; Glynn Turman
- Cinematography: Frank Stanley
- Edited by: Fred A. Chulack
- Music by: Tom McIntosh
- Production company: Radnitz/Mattel Productions
- Distributed by: New World Pictures
- Release dates: December 14, 1977 (California); February 3, 1978 (United States)
- Running time: 107 minutes
- Country: United States

A Hero Ain't Nothin' but a Sandwich is a 1977 film directed by Ralph Nelson about a black junior high school student who becomes a heroin addict. The screenplay was written by Alice Childress, based on her novel of the same name. It was shot on location in South Central Los Angeles. It was Nelson's last theatrical film before his death.

== Plot ==
Thirteen-year-old Benjie lives in a historic but declining neighborhood with his mother Raylene (Sweets), his grandmother Mrs. Peggy Bell, and his mother's boyfriend Butler, a maintenance worker and former musician. Benjie appears to be well adjusted, living in a decent house with a loving family, getting good grades in school, and spending time with his friends Jimmy Lee and Carwell. However, internally he struggles with the pain of being abandoned by his biological father, his mixed feelings about Sweets and Butler, and a growing awareness of racism in society. At Sweets' urging, Butler tries to forge a fatherly relationship with Benjie, who rejects his overtures.

When Benjie tries marijuana with his friends, he enjoys the high, and soon moves on to injecting heroin provided by local drug dealer Tiger. Benjie is attracted by Tiger's flattery and glamorous lifestyle, and the heroin initially helps him cope with his feelings. He soon becomes addicted, and must support his habit by stealing from his family and delivering drugs for Tiger. After a violent confrontation with Butler over his behavior, Benjie nods out at school and is sent to a drug rehabilitation hospital, where he undergoes therapy to learn to honestly express his suppressed thoughts and feelings. He is finally released from the hospital, only to learn that Carwell has died at age 12 from a lethal shot of heroin.

As Benjie struggles to stay clean, he and his family also struggle to communicate more honestly with each other, which often leads to family arguments. Unable to deal with Benjie, Butler moves out, but he and Sweets love each other too much to stay apart, and they reconcile. After Butler saves Benjie from a near-fatal accident, Benjie finally begins to trust and accept Butler as his father.

== Cast ==
- Cicely Tyson as "Sweets"
- Paul Winfield as Butler
- Larry B. Scott as Benjie
- Helen Martin as Mrs. Bell
- Glynn Turman as "Nigeria"
- David Groh as Mr. Cohen
- Harold Sylvester as Doctor
- Bill Cobbs as The Bartender
- Kevin Hooks as Tiger
- Erin Blunt as Carwell
- Joey Green as Jimmy Lee

== Critical reception ==
Janet Maslin of The New York Times thought that the film was poorly executed but praised some of the acting:

In no time at all, though, Benjie has become a heroin addict, a development for which the screenplay lays too much groundwork and Ralph Nelson's soft-pedaling direction lays none at all. This is a tragic tale told by film makers who don't seem able to believe that such things are really possible... is a movie that spells out everything but never manages to be entirely lucid... However, Mr. Scott is a winning young actor.

Jaqueline Trescott of The Washington Post felt similarly saying: ""Sandwich," now playing at several area theaters, becomes a prime social statement film of the restless high school assembly but not the riveting exploration of contemporary life its outline suggests for the mass audience. It is superficial and predictable but, worse, detached - and detachment from a monumental social problem like drugs is a disgrace...Participating in the unwieldy "Sandwich" is a fine roster of talent."
