= Inge Hardison =

American sculptor, artist and photographer

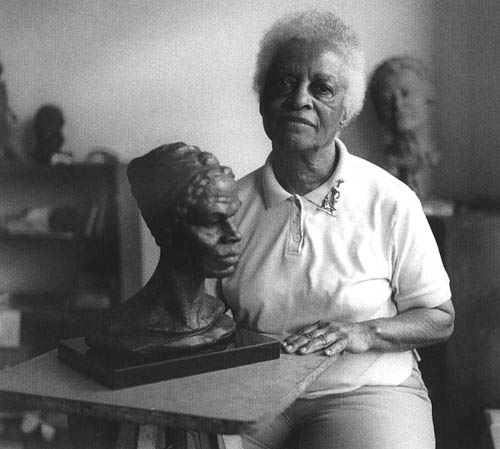
- Born: Ruth Inge Hardison; February 3, 1914; Portsmouth, Virginia, U.S.
- Died: March 23, 2016 (aged 102); New York City, New York, U.S.
- Occupation(s): Actress, Photographer, Sculptor, artist
- Known for: "Negro Giants in History" (1960s busts)
- Children: 1

Ruth Inge Hardison (February 3, 1914 – March 23, 2016) was an American sculptor, artist, and photographer, known particularly for her 1960s busts (or sculpted portraits) entitled "Negro Giants in History". Hardison's 1983 collection called "Our Folks", which features sculpted portraits of everyday people, is also of note. Her artistic productions largely surround historical black portraiture. She was especially interested in creatively representing the unspoken voices of the African American past. She was the only female in the Black Academy of Arts and Letters (BAAL), a group that encourages awareness of black artistic accomplishments, when this organization was founded in 1969.

== Early life ==
She was born in Portsmouth, Virginia in 1914. Her family later moved to Brooklyn, New York. Before completing her education, Hardison acted in the Broadway Productions of George Abbott's Sweet River and Country Wife (the latter opposite Ruth Gordon).

During her brief career in the theater, she began sculpting as a hobby. When she took part in the year long What a Life production, she created a sculpture of its cast, which was later displayed at the Mansfield Theatre. As a young woman, she studied Music and Creative Writing at Vassar College. She also studied at the Art Students League of New York and Tennessee State University.

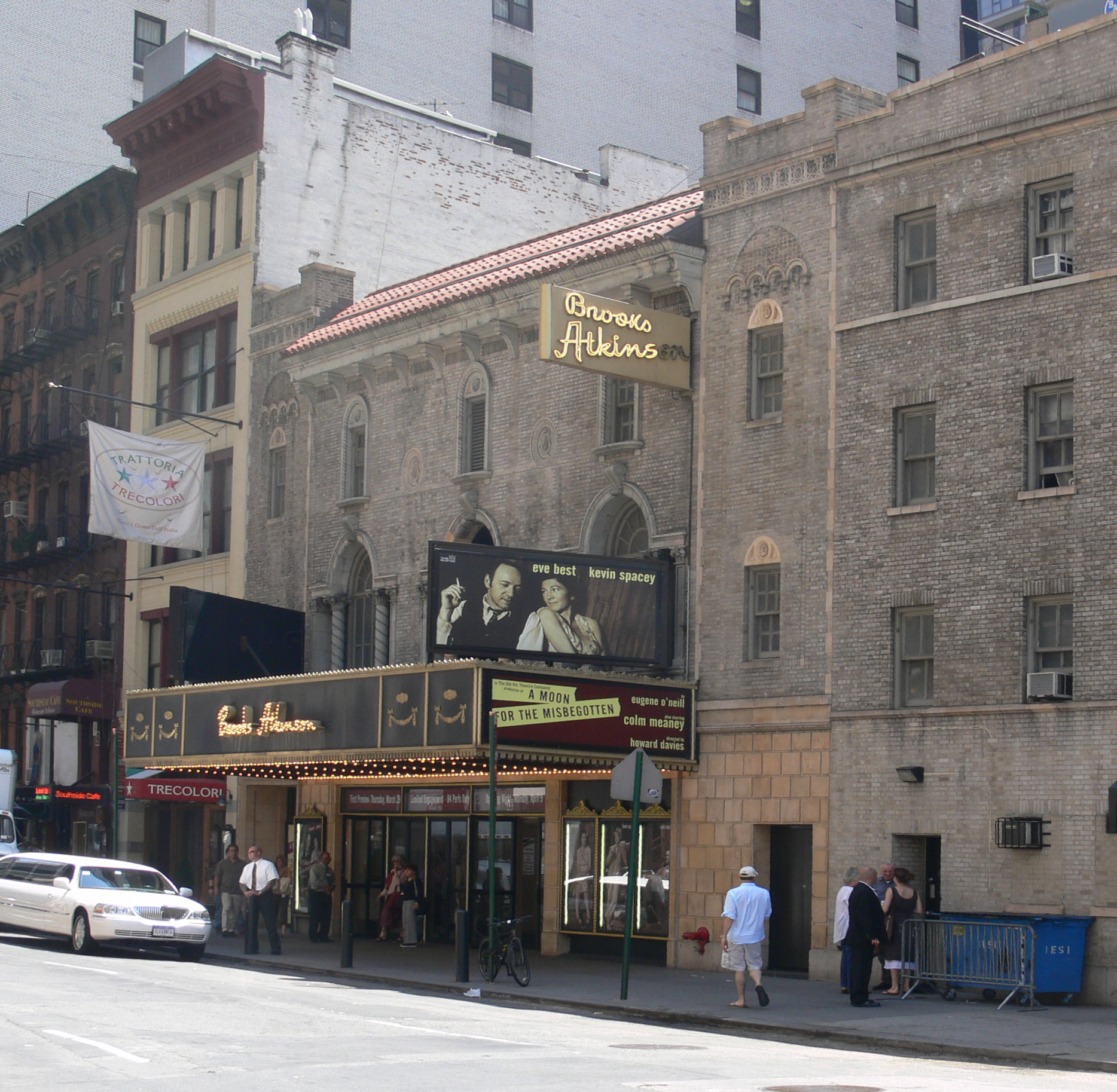
The Brooks Atkinson Theatre NYC, formerly the Mansfield Theatre, displayed one of Hardison's first sculptures

== Artistic works ==
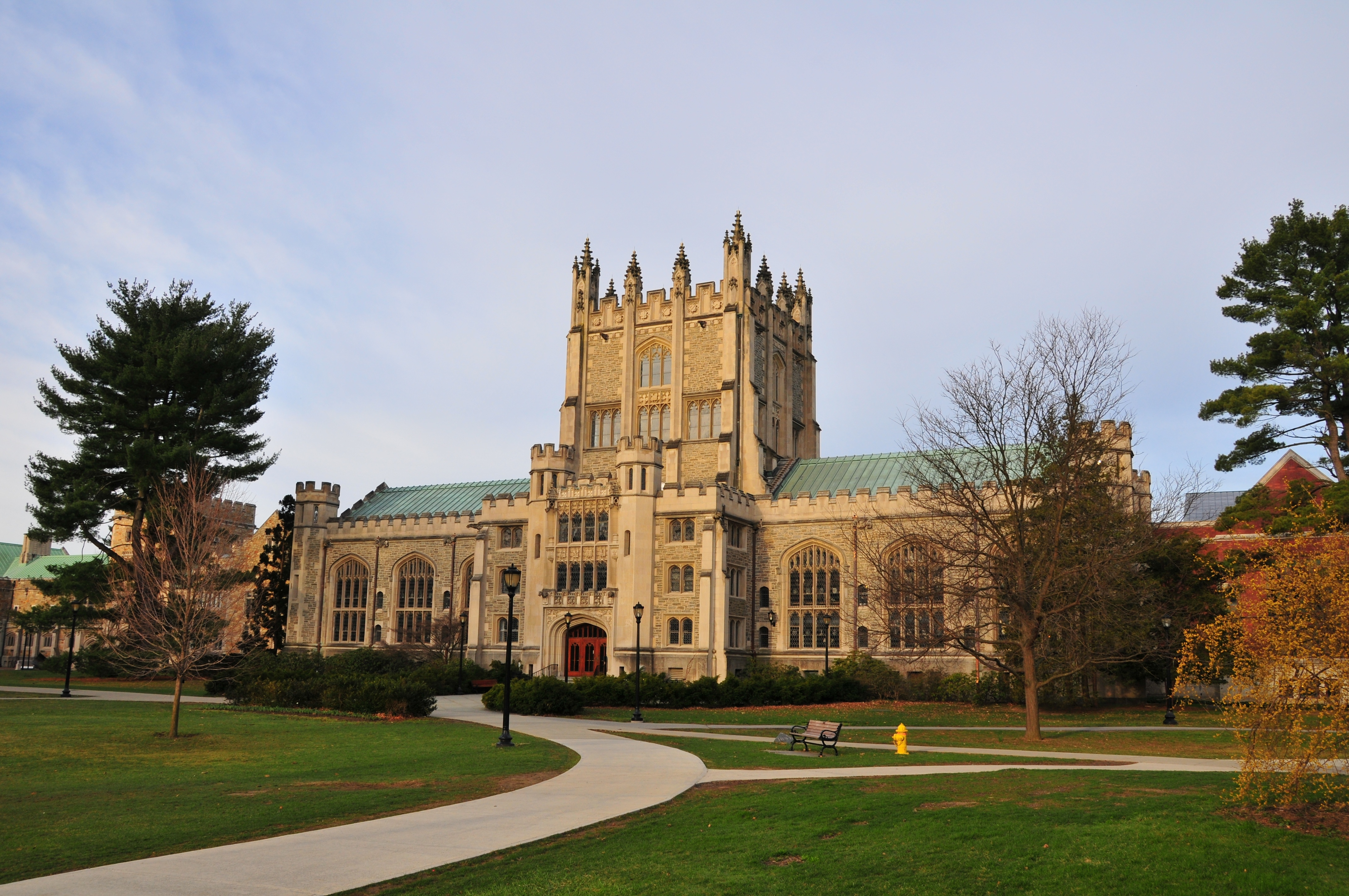
Hardison attended Vassar College in New York

Hardison's works largely begin as clay, wax, or plaster molds, and are later cast into cast stone or bronze. Hardison began "Negro Giants in History" (a series of cast iron busts) in 1963. Her first bust in that series was of Harriet Tubman, which measured eight inches in height; she created busts of W. E. B. Du Bois, Paul Robeson, George Washington Carver, Frederick Douglass, Rev. Dr. Martin Luther King, Sojourner Truth, and Mary McCleod Bethune, among others. Her bronze bust of Douglass, for example, was unveiled at Princeton's Firestone Library in 1983.

Other public works include a 7-foot abstract figure called "Jubilee" which stands on the campus of Medgar Evers College in Brooklyn, a series of 18 children on an outdoor wall of I.S.74 in Hunts Point in the Bronx, and a five-foot mother and child given to Mount Sinai Hospital in 1957 to express her gratitude for their help in delivering her only child, Yolande, in 1954.

== Death ==
Hardison died in 2016, aged 102, from Alzheimer's disease. She was survived by her daughter (Yolande Hardison), her grandson and three great-grandchildren.

== Work ==
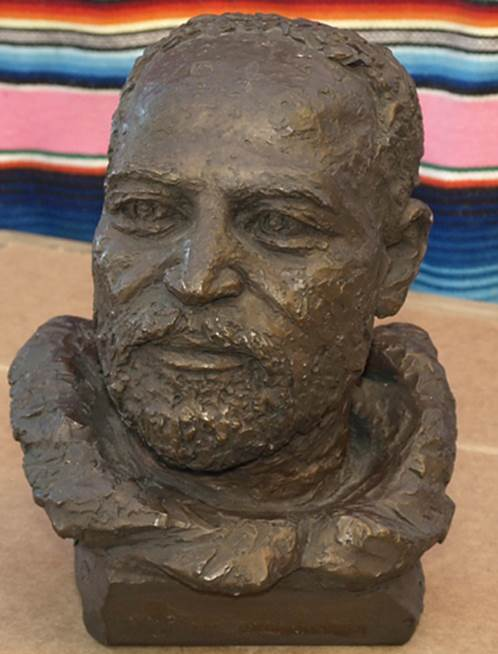
Matthew Henson

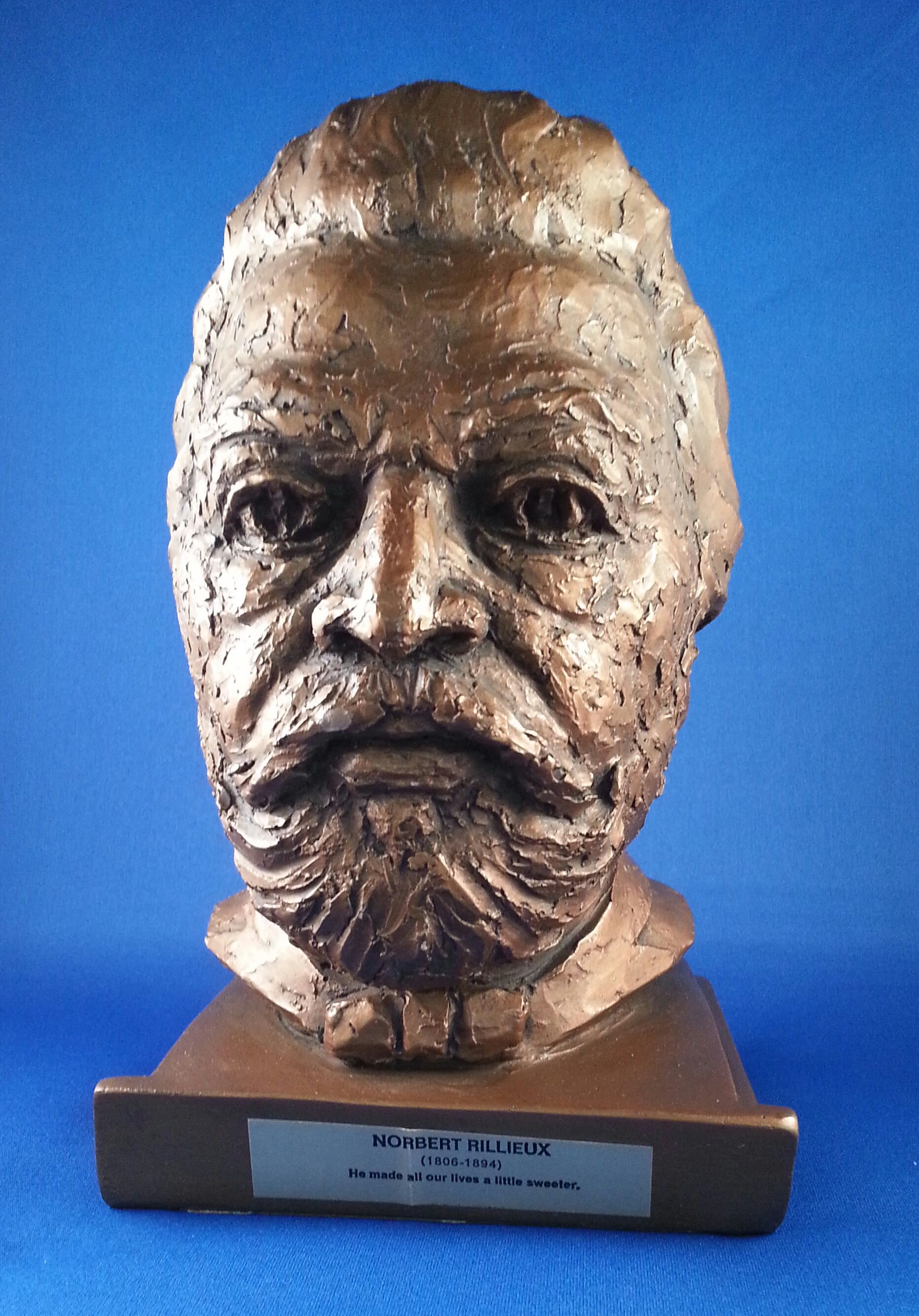
Norbert Rillieux

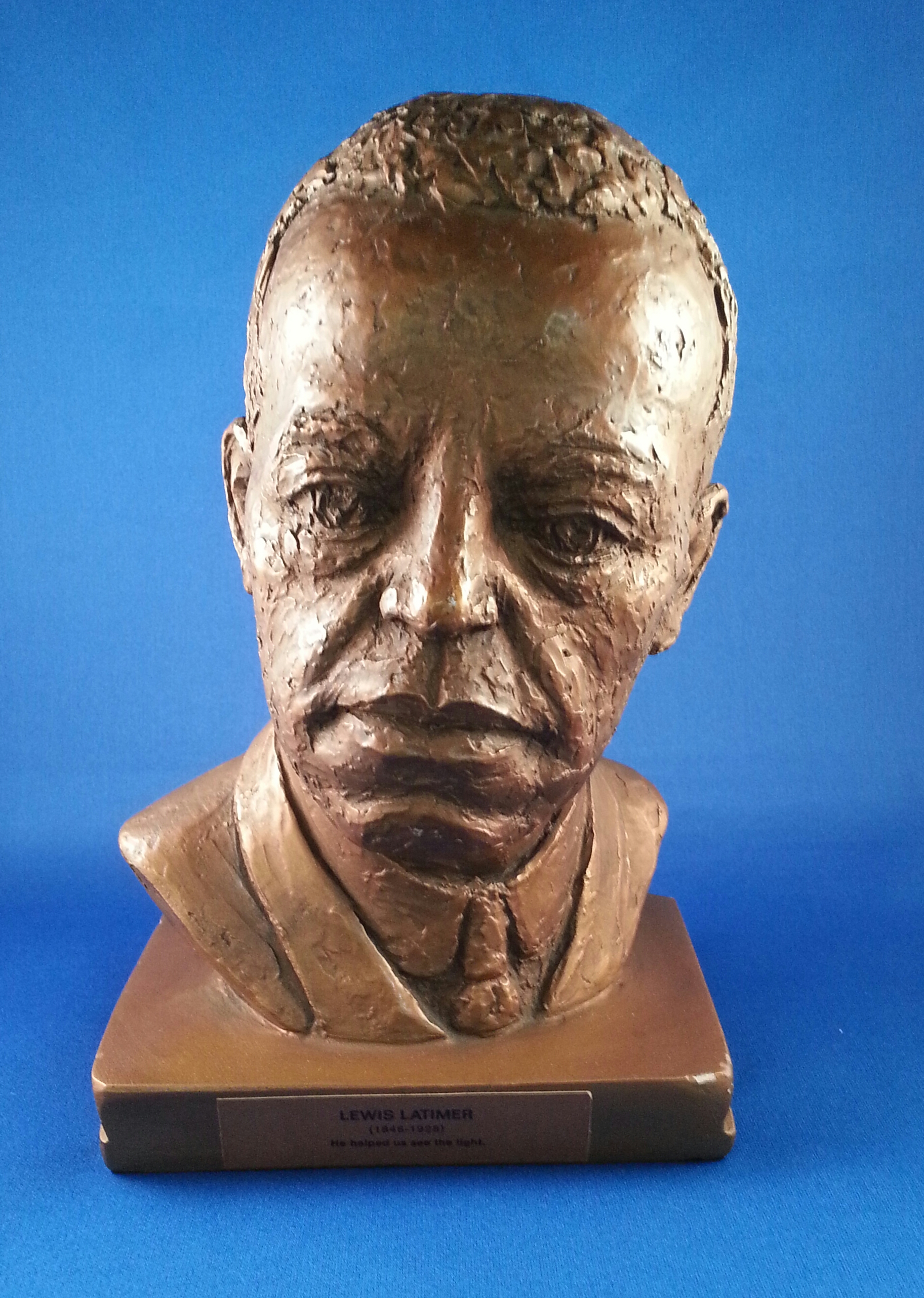
Lewis Latimer

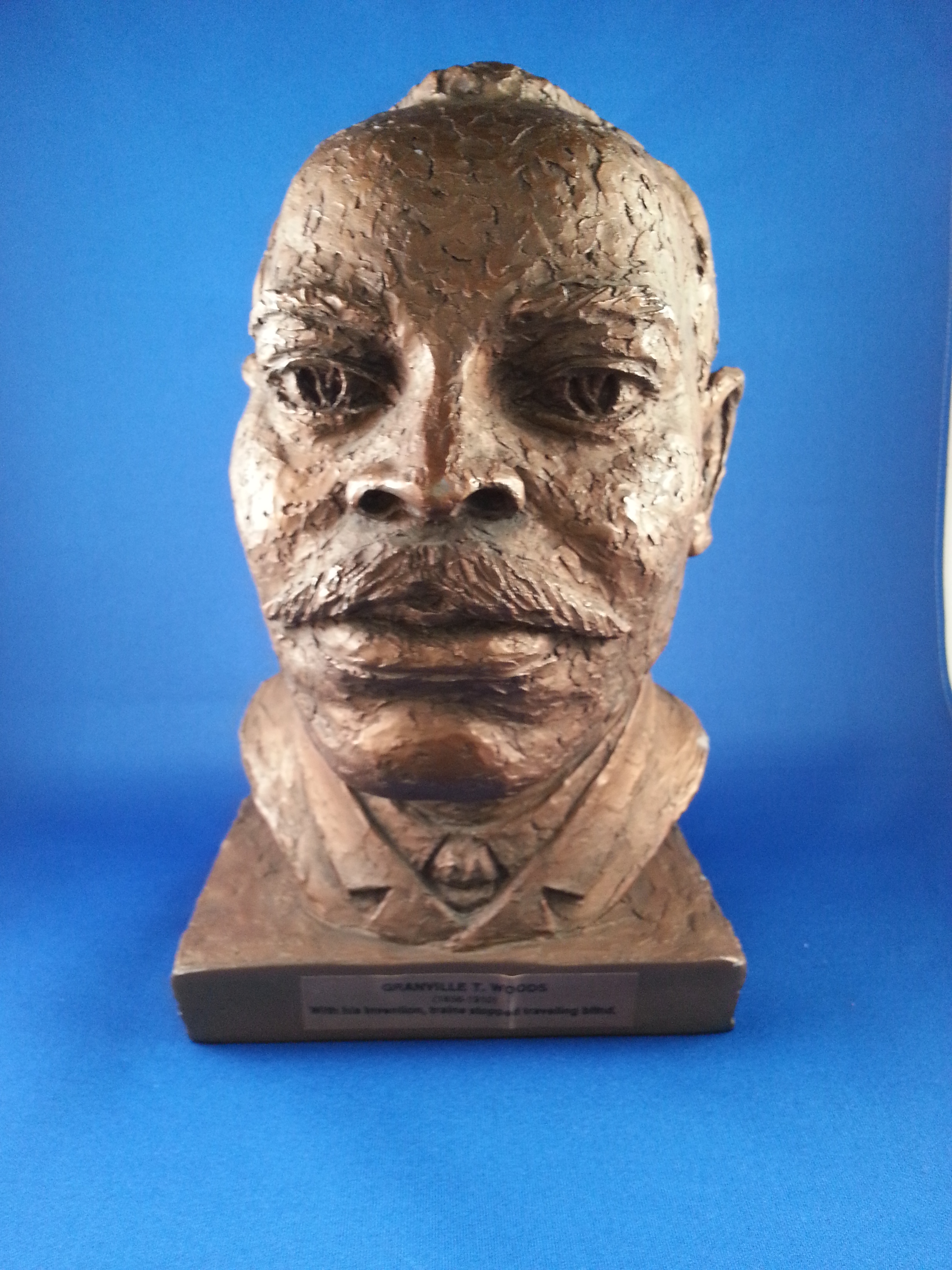
Granville Woods

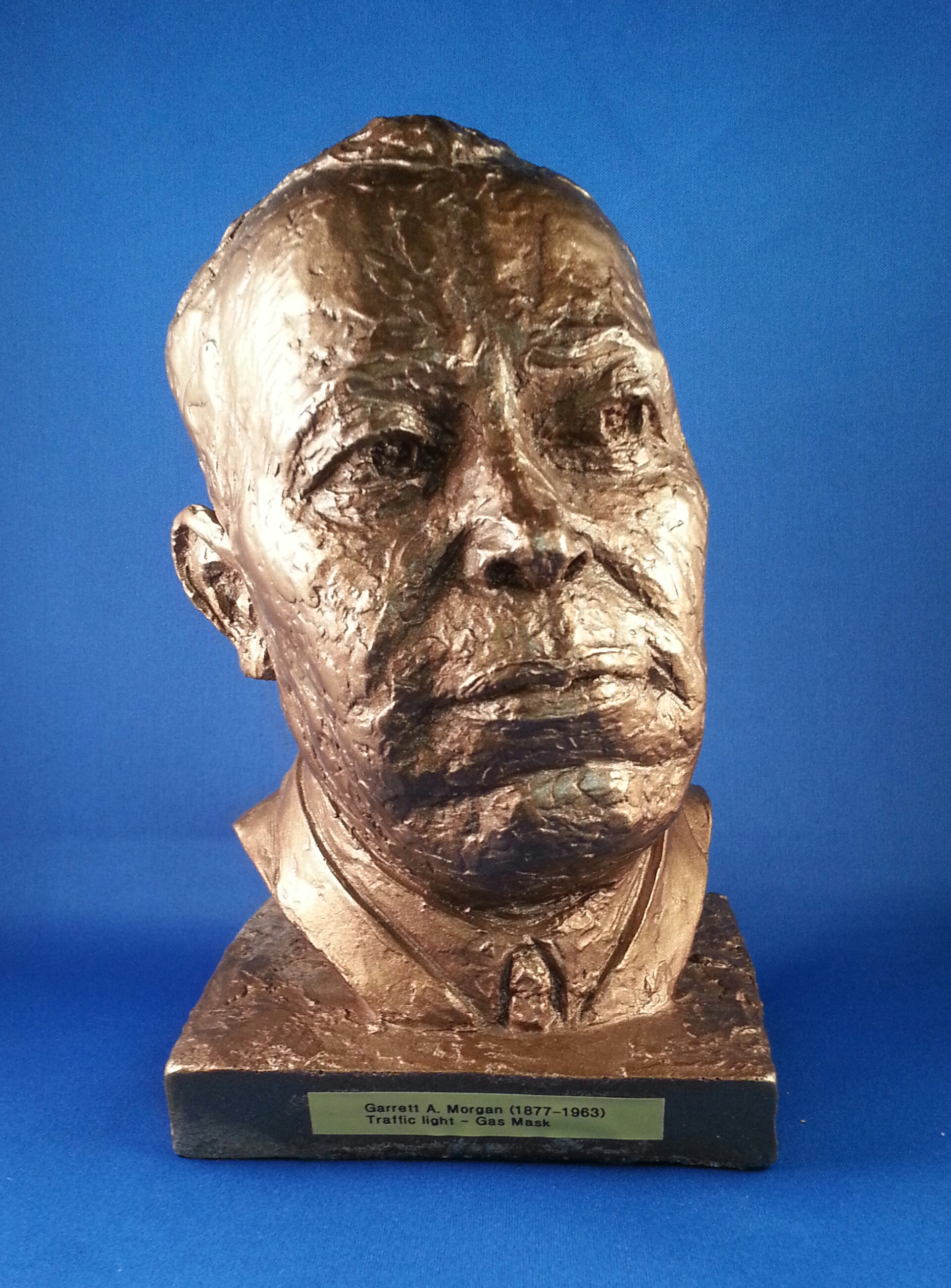
Garrett Morgan

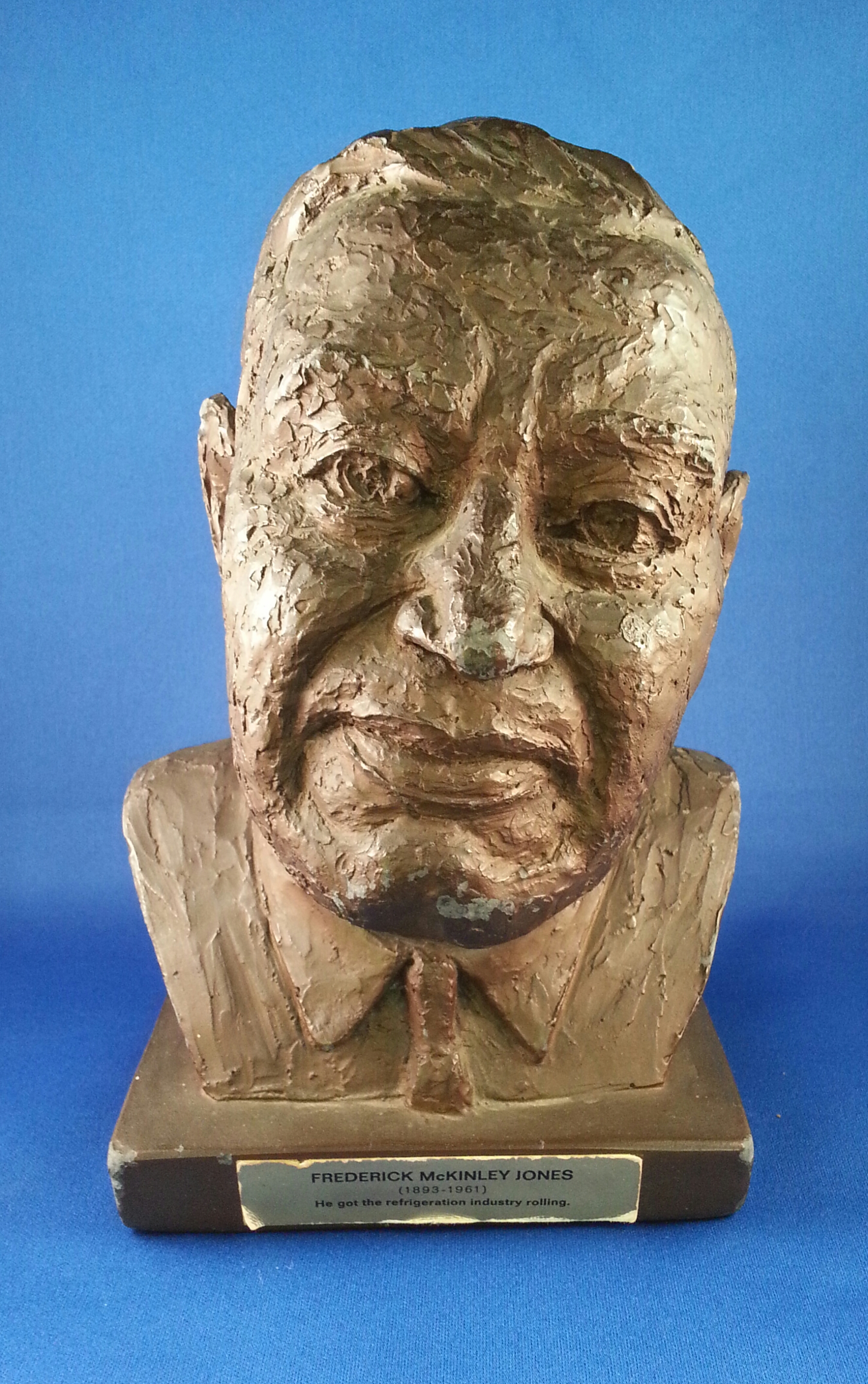
Frederick McKinley Jones

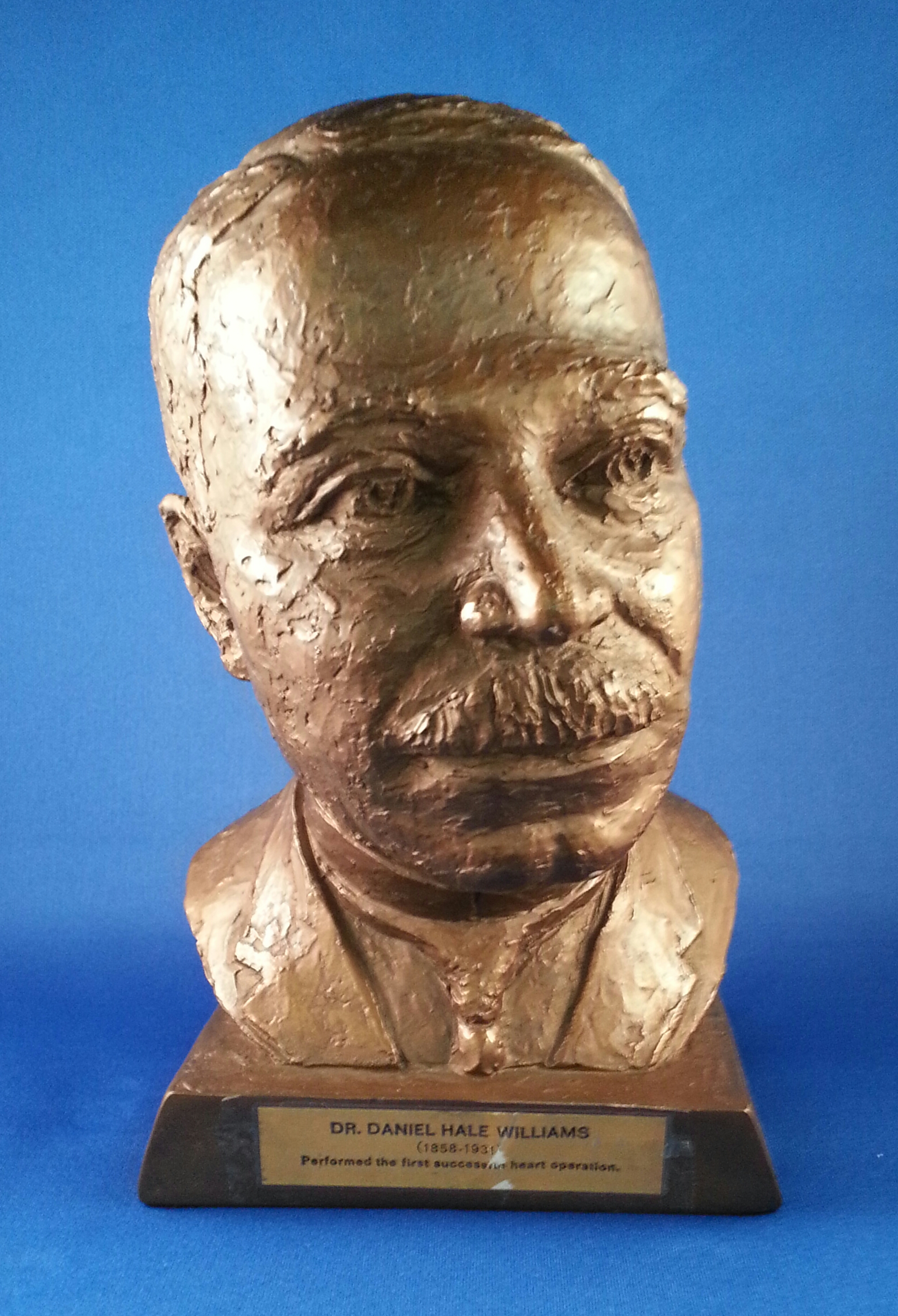
Dr. Daniel Hale Williams

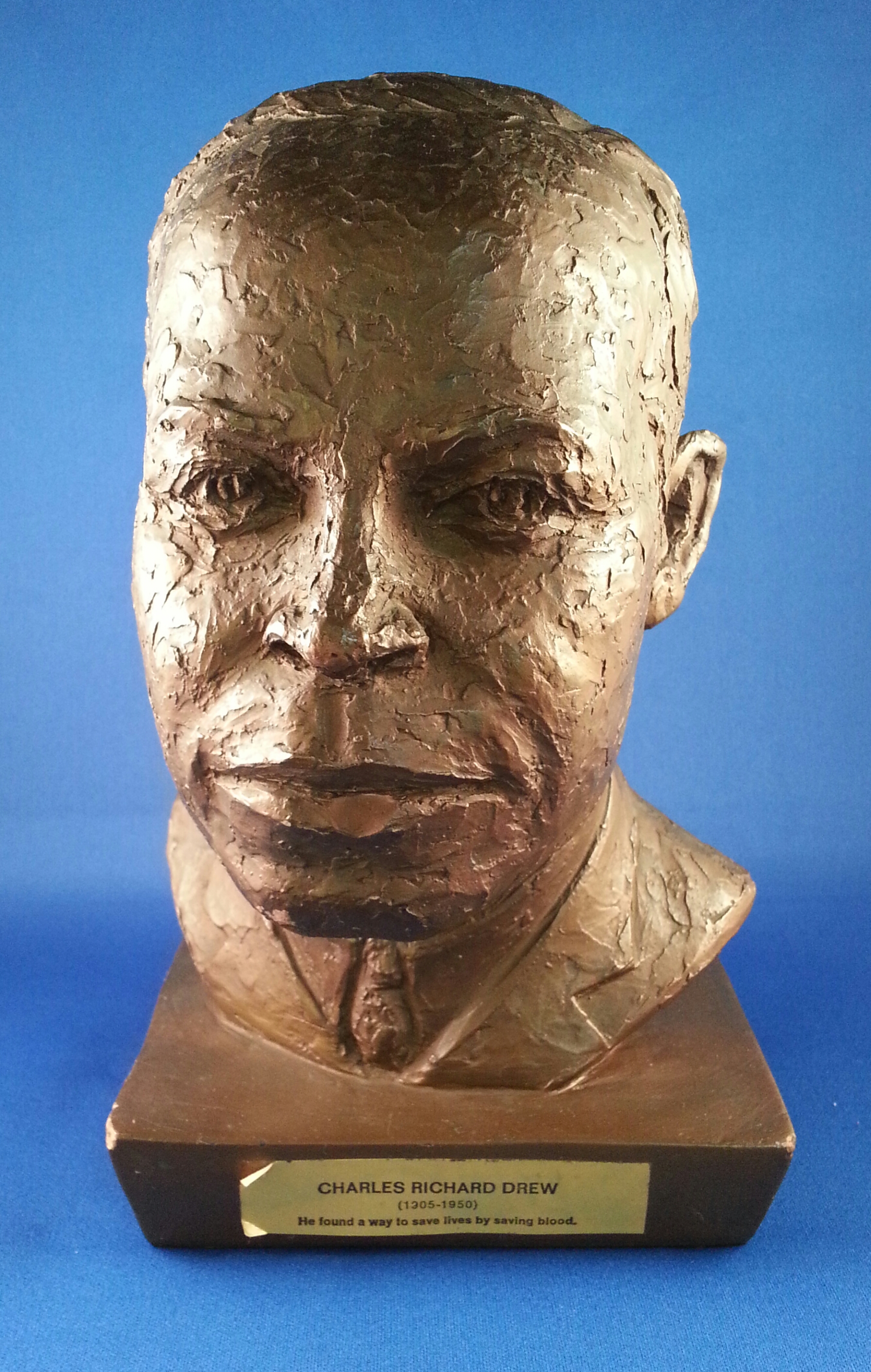
Charles Richard Drew

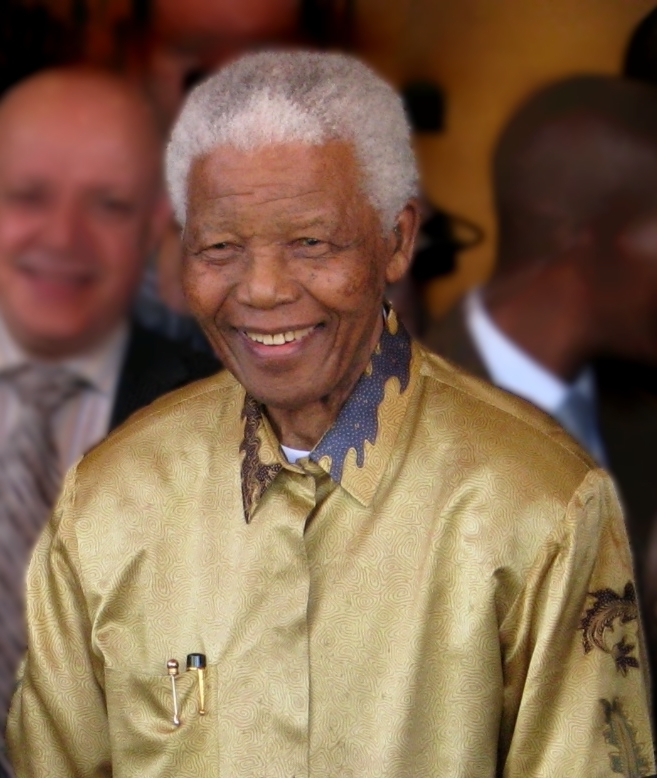
Nelson Mandela was one recipient of Hardison's work

At auction, her sculptures have earned more than $1300 apiece. In 1990 New York's Governor Mario Cuomo presented Hardison's 1990 two-foot sculpture of Sojourner Truth to Nelson Mandela on behalf of the people of New York State. Reflecting on her work, Hardison once said: 'During my long life I have enjoyed using different ways to distill the essences of my experiences so as to share for the good they might do in the lives of others.'
