= Sigma Gamma Rho =

Historically African American sorority

- ΣΓΡ
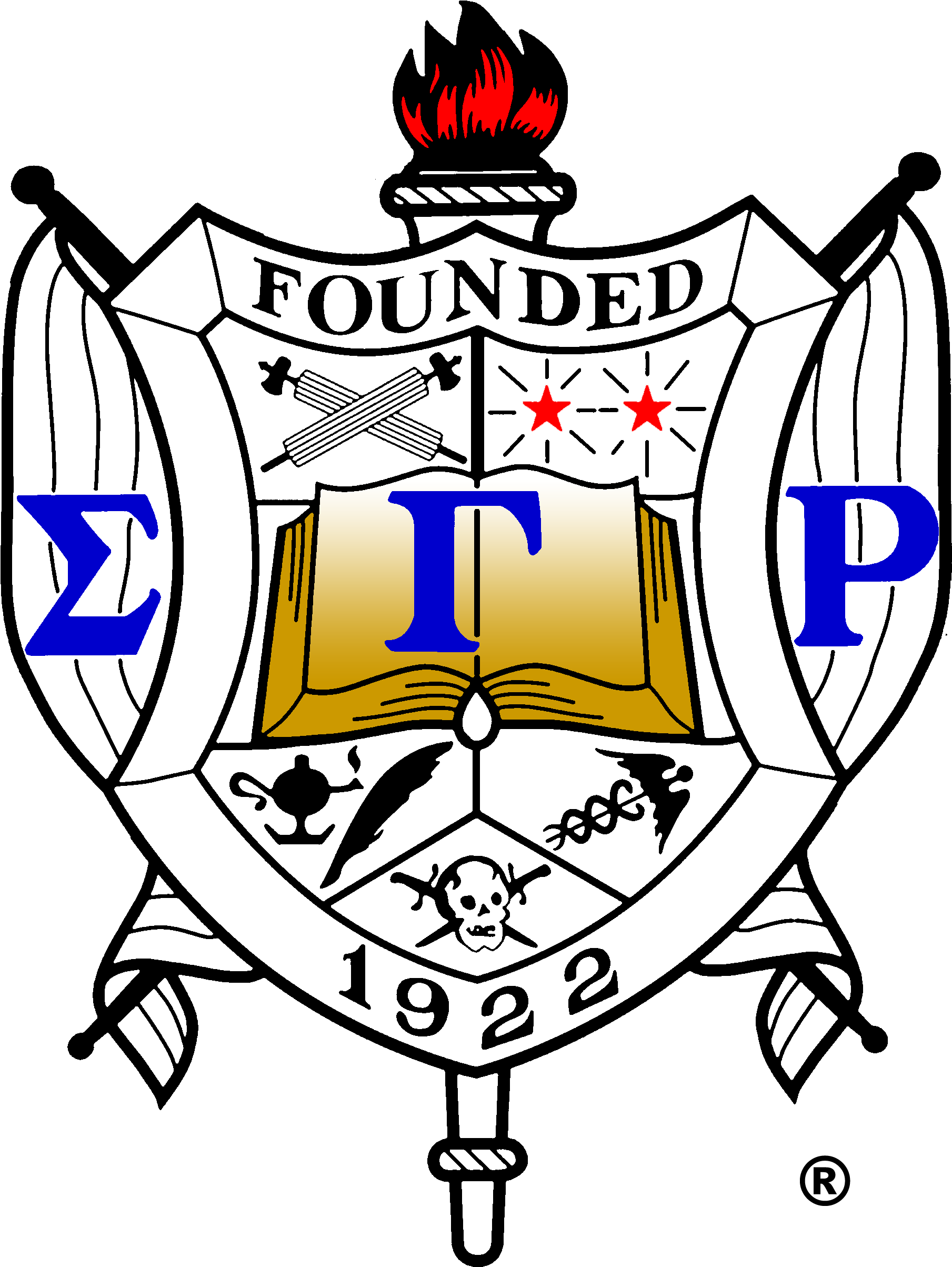
- Founded: November 12, 1922; 104 years ago Butler University
- Type: Social
- Affiliation: NPHC
- Status: Active
- Emphasis: African Americans
- Scope: International
- Motto: "Greater Service, Greater Progress"
- Colors: Royal Blue and Gold
- Flower: Yellow Tea Rose
- Mascot: Poodle
- Publication: The Aurora
- Chapters: 500+
- Nicknames: SGRhos, Lady Sigmas, Sigma Women, Pretty Poodles
- Headquarters: 1000 Southhill Drive, Suite 200; Cary, North Carolina 27513; United States
- Website: www.sgrho1922.org

Sigma Gamma Rho Sorority, Inc. (ΣГΡ), is a historically African-American sorority that was established in Indianapolis on November 12, 1922. Seven African-American educators were the founders of this sorority, which began as an organization for supporting the professional advancement and education of African-American women in education.

Sigma Gamma Rho gained its status as a national collegiate sorority with the granting of a charter in 1929 to the Alpha chapter at Butler University. Of the four historically African-American sororities affiliated with the National Pan-Hellenic Council, Sigma Gamma Rho is the only one that was originally formed at a predominantly white university instead of being formed at Howard University.

Sigma Gamma Rho has over 100,000 active members with more than 500 chapters across the US and elsewhere. Sigma Gamma Rho has affiliate groups designed to serve a variety of age groups and life stages. The groups are: Rhosebuds for young ladies ages 8–11 years old, the Rhoer Club for young ladies ages 12–18 years old and the Philos (friends) which is an adult group composed of women supporting the sorority's goals and programs.

== History ==
=== Founding ===
Sigma Gamma Rho Sorority, Inc. was founded on November 12, 1922, in Indianapolis, Indiana, by seven African American educators who were taking courses at Butler University. They were Mary Lou Allison Gardner Little, Dorothy Hanley Whiteside, Vivian Irene White Marbury, Nannie Mae Gahn Johnson, Hattie Mae Annette Dulin Redford, Bessie Mae Downey Rhoades Martin, and Cubena McClure. When it was first formed, the sorority was a professional sorority for Black female educators.

The founders focused on continuing their education, advancing professionally as educators in the Black community, supporting students’ academic success, and providing more educational opportunities for Black women.

The sorority developed during a period of significant racial discrimination in Indiana. The Ku Klux Klan held a great deal of power in Indiana during the 1920s. Butler University in Indianapolis later adopted a quota system that allowed only a small number of Black students to be accepted each year.

Robert Lee Brokenburr was an Indianapolis lawyer who became the legal advisor to the sorority. In December 1922, Brokenburr filed incorporation papers for Sigma Gamma Rho. Membership was limited to teachers working in recognized schools. Members were encouraged to pursue additional education and encourage others to do the same.

Over the next few years, the sorority focused on creating its organizational structure and identifying itself and its symbols. The sorority hosted its first national convention, called the Boulé, in Indianapolis in 1925. At the convention, the motto “Greater Progress, Greater Service” was introduced; it was later changed to “Greater Service, Greater Progress.”

By the time of the fifth Boulé in 1929, which took place in Cleveland, Ohio, members of Sigma Gamma Rho Sorority voted to make changes to the Articles of Incorporation that would allow the sorority to expand its mission beyond professional educators. A Charter Committee formed to obtain a charter for an Alpha Chapter at Butler University. Brokenburr filed the amended Articles of Incorporation for Sigma Gamma Rho Sorority in 1930.

=== National Pan-Hellenic Council ===
Sigma Gamma Rho was part of early discussions about establishing a long-term coordinating organization for Black Greek-letter organizations. In December 1928, representatives from Alpha Phi Alpha, Kappa Alpha Psi, Omega Psi Phi, Alpha Kappa Alpha, Delta Sigma Theta, and Sigma Gamma Rho attended a meeting in Indianapolis. The representatives agreed to create a temporary organization to coordinate efforts toward the formation of a permanent organization. Historian André McKenzie referred to this meeting as the “spiritual birth” of what later became the National Pan-Hellenic Council.

By 1930, the National Pan-Hellenic Council officially came into existence with five founding organizations. Alpha Phi Alpha and Phi Beta Sigma joined the Council in 1931, followed by Sigma Gamma Rho Sorority in 1937. On February 20, 1937, an article in the New Pittsburgh Courier stated that Sigma Gamma Rho Sorority was one of the original organizations involved in forming the National Pan-Hellenic Council. The article reported that Sigma Gamma Rho later withdrew after it did not meet newly adopted membership qualifications. It also stated that the sorority later petitioned for readmission and rejoined the Council as a full member in 1937.

=== Great Depression and initial national initiatives ===
During the Great Depression, Sigma Gamma Rho Sorority increased its educational and social services for African Americans. As part of its response to the challenges facing African American families during this era, Sigma Gamma Rho Sorority implemented several initiatives. Examples included sponsoring literary contests that awarded books to African American children, implementing vocational guidance programs, and establishing the Sigma Gamma Rho Employment Aid Bureau to help members locate employment.

Sigma Gamma Rho Sorority and other members of the National Pan-Hellenic Council lent their support to the NAACP's efforts to have Congress pass anti-lynching legislation, including the Costigan-Wagner Anti-Lynching Bill of 1935. Additionally, individual chapters of Sigma Gamma Rho Sorority established employment bureaus, literacy classes, and health programs in their respective communities.

In 1928, Alpha chapter in Indianapolis contributed to the NAACP defense fund. At its 1938 Boule in Houston, the sorority adopted a national program that included an annual April fundraising drive for the NAACP, continued work for passage of a federal anti-lynching bill, letters of thanks to the NAACP and the justices of the Supreme Court for the decision in Missouri ex rel. Gaines v. Canada, and plans for an employment bureau in each local chapter.

=== World War II and youth programs ===
During World War II, Sigma Gamma Rho Sorority worked with national organizations such as the American Red Cross and the U.S.O. to support wartime efforts. The sorority also supported the Fair Employment Practices Committee, which addressed racial discrimination in defense employment.

The sorority also developed youth programming during this period. One example was Sigma Teen Town, a national youth initiative designed to provide adolescents with places where they could gather and participate in supervised activities. Local chapters adapted the program according to the needs of their communities by opening teen canteens and developing other youth-centered activities.

=== Civil rights era ===
Sigma Gamma Rho created Camp Achievement near Pittsburgh in the 1950s, a program for Black and white participants. During the 1960s and 1970s the sorority supported several civil rights organizations and received the NAACP Service Trophy Award, and members backed the federal anti-poverty program and a nationwide Vocational Guidance Workshop Center. At its 30th Boule in New York in 1965, the sorority adopted resolutions on civil rights, commended Martin Luther King Jr. for his civil rights work, and voted NAACP life memberships for all 130 of its local chapters. At its 32nd Boule in Atlanta in 1969, the sorority presented $1,000 to Fannie Lou Hamer for economic development in Sunflower County, Mississippi. Its partnership with the March of Dimes dates to the 1970s.

=== Modern era ===
The sorority formed the Sigma Gamma Rho Sorority National Education Fund in 1984 to support education and research in the health and education fields. In the 1990s it worked with Africare and was named a Project Africa Gold Donor honoree for raising money for equipment for women in Zimbabwe. LaRona J. Morris, Grand Basileus from 1996 to 2000, founded Operation BigBookBag and launched the Youth Symposium nationwide. Sigma Gamma Rho marked its centennial in 2022.

== Governance ==
Sigma Gamma Rho is led by the International Grand Basileus, its national president, and its national headquarters is in Cary, North Carolina. Grand Basilei are elected, and the current holder is Marcia Harris (2024–present); earlier holders are listed under Past Grand Basilei. The sorority's national convention is called the Boulé; the first met in Indianapolis in 1925. Its chapters are undergraduate and alumnae chapters.

== Past Grand Basilei ==
Term	Grand Basileus
1922–1926	Mary Lou Allison Gardner Little (first elected; acting 1925–1926)
1926–1927	Edith Marlone Ward
1927–1931	Fannie O'Bannon
1931–1934	Edith Roache Walker
1934–1944	Bertha Black Rhoda
1944–1948	Ethel Ross Smith
1948–1954	Sallie Edwards Johnson
1954–1959	Edna Douglas
1959–1962	Dr. Lorraine A. Williams
1962–1963	Dr. Cleo Surry Higgins
1963–1967	Annie Lee Whitehead Neville
1967–1971	Dr. Lorraine A. Williams (second term)
1971–1976	Dr. Annie Lawrence-Brown
1976–1980	Evelyn Hood
1980–1984	Dr. Alice M. Swain
1984–1988	Rejesta V. Perry
1988–1992	Dr. Katie K. White
1992–1996	Corine J. Green
1996–2000	Dr. LaRona J. Morris
2000–2004	Helen J. Owens
2004–2008	Dr. Mynora J. Bryant
2008–2012	Joann Loveless
2012–2016	Bonita M. Herring
2016–2020	Deborah Catchings Smith
2020–2024	Rasheeda Liberty
2024–present	Marcia Harris

== Symbols ==
Sigma Gamma Rho's official colors are Royal Blue and Gold, and its official flower is the Yellow Tea Rose. The sorority's official mascot is the Poodle. Its official slogan is "Greater Service, Greater Progress," and its call is "EE-yip!" The sorority's official publication is The Aurora. The sorority is commonly abbreviated as SGRho or Sigma.

== Affiliate groups ==
Sigma Gamma Rho has three national affiliate groups for different ages and life stages.

Group	Ages / members	Established	Focus
Rhosebud Club	Girls 8–11	—	Introduces values of service, sisterhood and personal development.
Rhoer Club	Young women 12–18	1939, at the 14th Boulé in New York City	Leadership, academic and personal counseling, mentoring and community service. Over 500 clubs worldwide.
Philo Affiliate	Adult women who are not initiated members	Local auxiliaries from 1943; named "Philo" in 1954; national organization in 1980	Supports the sorority's service projects, programming, outreach and fundraising. Over 1,000 members.

== Programs ==
=== Project Reassurance ===
Project Reassurance is the sorority's signature program and is offered wherever it has chapters.

=== Operation BigBookBag ===
Founded in 1996 by LaRona J. Morris, in partnership with the Ancient Egyptian Arabic Order Nobles Mystic Shrine, Operation BigBookBag supplies school supplies and educational materials to at-risk children.

=== Youth Symposium ===
Launched nationwide during Morris's term (1996–2000), the Youth Symposium is held each March during "Sigma Week" and addresses issues affecting youth.

=== Women's Wellness Initiative ===
The initiative coordinates chapter programming on health issues affecting women of color.

=== Swim 1922 ===
Developed with USA Swimming, Swim 1922 teaches water safety to address racial disparities in swimming ability.

=== Project CRADLE Care ===
Project CRADLE Care works with the March of Dimes on Black maternal and infant health through outreach, advocacy, and education.

== Philanthropy ==
=== National Education Fund ===
The Sigma Gamma Rho Sorority National Education Fund, Inc. (NEF) provides access to scholarships, leadership development, and educational enrichment opportunities for students from all backgrounds. NEF seeks to remove barriers to academic achievement and open doors to future success. Its mission is twofold: to offer financial assistance to students with demonstrated need and to conduct educational programs that enhance quality of life through workshops, symposiums, and public forums.

=== SPEAR Foundation ===
SPEAR seeks to promote social, civic, cultural, economic, and educational progress for underserved communities. It supports public education and social science research aimed at reducing poverty and improving the lives of minorities, women, and children. SPEAR also provides fiscal sponsorship, enabling local chapters and community-based organizations to secure resources and implement service and advocacy programs effectively.

=== G.O.L.D.E.N. Charitable Foundation ===
The G.O.L.D.E.N. Charitable Foundation carries forward the sorority's public-service work by connecting members, affiliates, families, and community members with charitable initiatives and giving opportunities that serve women, children, and families in underserved communities.

== Chapters ==
The sorority has chartered more than 500 chapters in the United States, the Bahamas, Bermuda, Canada, Ghana, Germany, Japan, South Korea, the U.S. Virgin Islands and the United Arab Emirates.

== Member misconduct ==
The New York Times wrote about two hazing incidents involving the sorority. In 2008, a pledge at San Jose State University filed a civil suit against the sorority after being severely beaten, harassed, and threatened to keep the abuse a secret. Four sorority members were arrested and served 90 days in county jail. In 2010, at Rutgers University, six Sigma Gamma Rho women were arrested and charged with a felony after striking one pledge over 200 times which forced her to seek medical attention.

In March 2022, the sorority was expelled from Bowling Green State University following reports of "severe hazing"; the sorority committed at least six policy violations of the BGSU Code of Student Conduct including aggravated assault and forcing pledges to steal alcohol and marijuana.

== See also ==
- Cultural interest fraternities and sororities
- List of social sororities and women's fraternities
