= Southwest Border Regional Commission =

United States commission

Agency overview
- Formed: 2008
- Jurisdiction: Federal government of the United States
- Agency executive: Juan Sanchez, Federal Co-Chair
- Website: https://sbrc.gov/

The Southwest Border Regional Commission (SBRC) is one of seven federal regional commissions and authorities authorized by the United States Congress to address instances of major economic distress in certain defined socioeconomic regions.

== History ==
The SBRC was created by the 2008 U.S. Farm Bill, which also created the Northern Border Regional Commission (NBRC) and the Southeast Crescent Regional Commission (SCRC). All three commissions share common authorizing language modeled after the Appalachian Regional Commission (ARC).

On December 6, 2022, the United States Senate confirmed Juan Sanchez, then-Director of Economic Development and Special Initiatives for Senator Martin Heinrich (D-NM), to serve as the first Federal Co-chairman for the SBRC.

== Service area ==
- Arizona: Cochise, Gila, Graham, Greenlee, La Paz, Maricopa, Pima, Pinal, Santa Cruz, and Yuma counties.
- California: Imperial, Los Angeles, Orange, Riverside, San Bernardino, San Diego, and Ventura counties
- New Mexico: Catron, Chaves, Dona Ana, Eddy, Grant, Hidalgo, Lincoln, Luna, Otero, Sierra, and Socorro counties
- Texas: Atascosa, Bandera, Bee, Bexar, Brewster, Brooks, Cameron, Coke, Concho, Crane, Crockett, Culberson, Dimmit, Duval, Ector, Edwards, El Paso, Frio, Gillespie, Glasscock, Hidalgo, Hudspeth, Irion, Jeff Davis, Jim Hogg, Jim Wells, Karnes, Kendall, Kenedy, Kerr, Kimble, Kinney, Kleberg, LaSalle, Live Oak, Loving, Mason, Maverick, McMullen, Medina, Menard, Midland, Nueces, Pecos, Presidio, Reagan, Real, Reeves, San Patricio, Shleicher, Sutton, Starr, Sterling, Terrell, Tom Green, Upton, Uvalde, Val Verde, Ward, Webb, Willacy, Wilson, Winkler, Zapata, and Zavala counties

== See also ==
- Appalachian Regional Commission
- Delta Regional Authority
- Denali Commission
- Southeast Crescent Regional Commission
