= Appalachian Regional Commission =

Government agency in the United States

- Counties included within the Appalachian Regional Commission's charter as of July 2023
- Predecessor: Council of Appalachian Governors, President's Appalachian Regional Commission
- Formation: March 9, 1965; 61 years ago
- Type: State–federal partnership
- Purpose: To innovate, partner, and invest to build community capacity and strengthen economic growth in Appalachia.
- Headquarters: 1666 Connecticut Ave NW; Suite 700; Washington, D.C., U.S.
- Coordinates: 38.912448°N 77.045374°W
- Federal co-chair: Gayle Conelly Manchin
- States' co-chair: Tate Reeves
- Executive director: Brandon McBride
- Budget: $285,600,000 _{(2019)}
- Website: www.arc.gov

The Appalachian Regional Commission (ARC) is a United States federal–state partnership that works with the people of Appalachia to create opportunities for self-sustaining economic development and improved quality of life. Congress established ARC to bring the region into socioeconomic parity with the rest of the nation.

The Appalachian Region, as defined by Congress, includes all of West Virginia and portions of 12 other states: Alabama, Georgia, Kentucky, Maryland, Mississippi, New York, North Carolina, Ohio, Pennsylvania, South Carolina, Tennessee, and Virginia. ARC serves 423 counties and 8 independent cities that encompass roughly 205,000 square miles (530,000 km^{2}), with a population of more than 25 million people.

The Appalachian Regional Commission has 14 members: the governors of the 13 Appalachian states and a federal co-chair, who is appointed by the president and confirmed by the Senate. A professional staff carries out the work of the commission.

The current federal co-chair is Gayle Conelly Manchin. Manchin was appointed by President Joe Biden and confirmed by the Senate on April 29, 2021, by voice vote. The 2026 states' co-chair is Mississippi governor Tate Reeves. Grassroots participation is provided through 73 local development districts, which are multi-county organizations with boards made up of elected officials, business people, and other local leaders. The ARC is a planning, research, advocacy, and funding organization. It does not have any governing power within the region.

== Geography and sociology ==
The ARC's geographic range of coverage was defined by Congress broadly, in order to cover as many economically underdeveloped areas as possible; as a result, it extends beyond the geographic area usually thought of as "Appalachia." While Congress did aim to define Appalachia, the ultimate purpose and concern of the ARC is economic development rather than cultural definition.

=== ARC boundaries versus cultural boundaries ===
A study conducted in 1981 comparing the perceptions of Appalachia's boundaries and the ARC's definition, published in the academic journal Southeastern Geographer, asked respondents to draw an encircled area identifying what they considered to be Appalachia on a map. The study found less than 20% of respondents agreed that southern New York was part of Appalachia, as designated by the ARC, and that less than 10% of respondents agreed with the ARC's inclusion of northeastern Mississippi and northwestern Alabama in Appalachia. Respondents residing outside of Appalachia were more likely to define the region broadly, in agreement with the ARC, and respondents from within the region were more likely to define it restrictively. The majority of responses defined Appalachia as an area encircling the locations possessing the highest amount of negative characteristics that the ARC was created to combat—flooding, environmental degradation, poverty, and geographic isolation, among others.

Cultural definitions of Appalachia. This map should not be taken at face value, as cultural definitions vary widely between regions and individuals: Always included in Appalachia Usually included in Appalachia Sometimes included in Appalachia Rarely included in Appalachia Physically contains the Appalachian Mountains or associated features; not culturally Appalachian The blue dotted line encloses the counties included in the ARC definition

=== Socioeconomic characteristics of ARC boundaries ===
The ARC does not precisely correspond to what is considered Appalachia by the general public. For instance, parts of Mississippi were included in the commission because of similar problems with unemployment and poverty. In 2008, the Youngstown, Ohio region was declared part of Appalachia by the ARC due to the collapse of the steel industry in the region in the early 1980s, and the continuing unemployment problems in the region since. Additionally, certain regions generally considered to be part of Appalachia, such as most of Virginia's portion of the Shenandoah Valley, are not included in the ARC's charter.

The inclusion of northeastern Mississippi and northwestern Alabama in the ARC's charter was additionally in part based on an altered Rand McNally map submitted to Congress and the governor of Mississippi at the suggestion of local developer George Thompson Pound, depicting mountains in the two states that did not exist. However, northeastern Alabama does contain mountains and foothills that extend as far south as the Pinhoti Trail, which indirectly connects to the Appalachian Trail.

The journal Southern Cultures explained the inclusion of northeastern Mississippi and northwestern Alabama as having been done for two main reasons—to undermine the direct funding of Black communities in the affected areas in favor of preserving white supremacy, and to engage in historical negationism, made possible due to the method which the ARC used to fund communities within its charter. An area home to a large number of Black Americans with an extensive history was effectively forced into a region known for its predominantly white culture and lack of slavery within American history, in spite of the protest of Black residents. As part of the scheme, attractions were to be built in the area with ARC funds celebrating the history of white settlers, with no attention paid towards the native Chickasaws who had once inhabited the region or the current Black residents.

Funding and development directed to the region after the establishment of the ARC largely eschewed Black residents and communities as a result of the efforts of Pound and Southern Democrats, and was instead directly sent to local ruling whites. In the early 2020s, few residents of northeastern Mississippi and northwestern Alabama were aware they are a part of what Congress has designated as Appalachia, and do not consider themselves to be Appalachian.

=== County economic classifications ===
The ARC uses an index-based system to classify counties based on economic status, with five categories: distressed, at-risk, transitional, competitive, and attainment. In addition to county classifications, the ARC additionally classifies specific census tracts within non-distressed counties as distressed if they meet the standards of economic distress set by the ARC. The category at-risk was introduced on ARC maps in 2006; before then only the four other categories were used.

A map depicting the economic status of counties within the ARC's service area as of fiscal year 2024.

An animated map depicting the economic status of counties within the ARC's service area from fiscal year 2002–2024.

The ARC uses several indicators to designate an area as distressed, including median family income and the local poverty rate. Additional factors that go into determining a county's status are the three-year average unemployment rate and per capital market income.

Criteria for ARC economic classification
Economic classification	Description
Distressed	Counties designated as distressed are the most economically depressed of counties within the ARC. They are extremely below average, ranking in the bottom 10% of counties in the United States.
At-risk	Counties designated as at-risk have a high chance of falling into the category of distressed. They are well below average, ranking in the bottom 10-25% of counties in the United States.
Transitional	Counties designated as transitional are economically below average, average, or above average, and may be moving from a weak to a strong economy or vice versa. They consist of most counties within the ARC and make up the bottom 25% and top 25% of counties in the United States.
Competitive	Counties designated as competitive are well above average and are able to compete in the national economy, attracting business. Economic conditions may be good, but they do not rank within the top 10% of counties in the United States.
Attainment	Counties designated as attainment are the economically strongest counties in the ARC and in the nation. They are very above average and rank in the top 10% of counties in the United States.

States in the ARC by amount of counties with economic classification as of FY 2024
By percent of total ARC counties

ARC state	Percent Distressed	Percent with distressed tracts	Total % of distressed and with distressed tract	Percent at-risk	Percent transitional	Percent competitive	Percent attainment
Alabama	05.41%	81.08%	86.49%	16.22%	72.97%	02.70%	02.70%
Georgia	05.41%	59.46%	86.49%	10.81%	70.27%	08.11%	05.41%
Kentucky	66.67%	27.77%	94.44%	27.77%	05.56%	0%	0%
Maryland	0%	66.67%	66.67%	00.00%	100%	0%	0%
Mississippi	37.50%	45.83%	83.33%	41.67%	20.83%	0%	0%
New York	0%	71.43%	71.43%	21.43%	78.57%	0%	0%
North Carolina	0%	67.74%	67.74%	19.35%	80.65%	0%	0%
Ohio	12.50%	71.88%	84.38%	46.88%	34.38%	06.25%	0%
Pennsylvania	01.92%	59.62%	61.54%	03.85%	90.38%	03.85%	0%
South Carolina	14.29%	71.43%	85.71%	14.29%	57.14%	14.29%	0%
Tennessee	09.62%	76.92%	86.54%	36.54%	51.92%	01.92%	0%
Virginia	15.15%	54.55%	69.70%	33.33%	48.48%	0%	03.03%
West Virginia	32.73%	43.64%	76.36%	21.82%	43.64%	01.82%	0%
% of all counties	19.26%	58.47%	86.54%	24.13%	51.13%	02.55%	00.93%

By numbers

ARC state	Distressed	With distressed tract	# of Distressed tracts	Total # of distressed and with distressed tract	At-risk	Transitional	Competitive	Attainment	Total counties in ARC
Alabama	2	30	173	32	6	27	1	1	37
Georgia	2	22	71	32	4	26	3	2	37
Kentucky	36	15	50	51	15	3	0	0	54
Maryland	0	2	12	2	0	3	0	0	3
Mississippi	9	11	26	20	10	5	0	0	24
New York	0	10	40	10	3	11	0	0	14
North Carolina	0	21	84	21	6	25	0	0	31
Ohio	4	23	105	27	15	11	2	0	32
Pennsylvania	1	31	196	32	2	47	2	0	52
South Carolina	1	5	36	6	1	4	1	0	7
Tennessee	5	40	128	45	19	27	1	0	52
Virginia	5	18	28	23	11	16	0	1	33
West Virginia	18	24	80	42	12	24	1	0	55
Total	83	252	1,029	373	104	229	11	4	431

=== ARC subregions ===
In order to better facilitate subregional analysis and in recognition of the differences between various areas in Appalachia, the ARC splits their service area into different regions—Northern, North Central, Central, South Central, and Southern. The ARC's definitions take into account political boundaries, physical geography, demographics, economic activity, and transportation activity.

Previously, the ARC's subregions only consisted of Northern, Central, and Southern. These classifications were revised in 2009 in order to make subregional analysis more specific. As part of this process, in 2005, several new subregion schemes were proposed. Notably, two proposals involved the categorization of the ARC's service area into areas that were distinctly labeled as being part of Appalachia or separate from it, which had addressed the fact that not all of the area the ARC serves is Appalachian.

The subregions of the ARC as of July 2023.

2005 ARC Subregion Proposals
Case	Description	Map
Baseline	"Under Appalachia’s current subregional configuration, the Appalachian counties of New York, Pennsylvania, Maryland, and Ohio, along with most of West Virginia, comprise northern Appalachia. Included among the counties in central Appalachia are the Mountaineer State’s nine southernmost counties, as well as eastern Kentucky, Virginia’s southwestern tip, and parts of Tennessee. Southern Appalachia contains western Virginia and East Tennessee, as well as the western Carolinas and the northern parts of Georgia, Alabama, and Mississippi."	
A	"The first of the five alternate configurations maintains the three subregions, but shrinks northern Appalachia by reclassifying most counties in Ohio and West Virginia that lie south of the extended Mason-Dixon line into the central portion. Counties in the Potomac Valley (western Maryland and the West Virginia panhandle) remain in northern Appalachia. Southern Appalachia’s boundaries remain unchanged from the baseline case."	
B	"This configuration divides Appalachia into four subregions. Northern Appalachia includes only those counties lying north of the extended Mason-Dixon line, while southern Appalachia includes only the Appalachian counties in South Carolina, Georgia, Alabama, and Mississippi. A now-extended central Appalachia is then split into east-central and west-central subregions—using interstate highways (Interstates 77 and 79 in West Virginia, then Interstate 81 south of the I-77 intersection) to form the boundary. For those counties through which the highways pass, the preponderance of their land area determines whether they end up in east-central Appalachia or west-central Appalachia. The result separates western North Carolina and the Great Valley (which includes many recreational and retirement magnets, plus several university towns) from the West Virginia counties where mining and manufacturing predominate."	
C	"Like Alternative Case B, this is a four-subregion configuration that maintains the southern boundaries of Alternative B. Under this case, however, the dividing line between east-central Appalachia and west-central Appalachia are more freely drawn, placing a greater weight on a county’s economic status in Fiscal Year 2003 (which had been used in the report series Demographic and Socioeconomic Change in Appalachia). This resulted in west-central Appalachia encompassing blocs of Distressed counties in West Virginia and northern Tennessee. The greater emphasis on economic status also comes into effect for the Ohio counties south of the extended Mason-Dixon line, as a handful of counties that were not classified as Distressed are returned to northern Appalachia, leaving a bloc of mostly Distressed counties in the west-central subregion."	
D	"Under this configuration, Appalachia again is divided into three subregions—only in this case the boundaries are determined by the major physiographic divisions designated by the U.S. Geological Service (USGS). The USGS bases their system— used throughout the country—on geology type, surface texture, elevation, and other factors. The Appalachian region covers three physiographic divisions: the Appalachian Highlands (containing 331 of the 410 counties), the Atlantic Plain (which includes eastern Mississippi and central Alabama), and the Interior Plains (containing parts of Ohio, Kentucky, Tennessee, and northwestern Alabama)."	
E	"As in Alternative D, this final case uses the USGS physiographic classifications in determining the subregions, but divides the Appalachian Highlands into its four physiographic “provinces”—Piedmont, Blue Ridge, Valley and Ridge, and Appalachian Plateaus. The resulting configuration produces six subregions, reducing the imbalance that exists in Alternative D. (Yet it does not eliminate the imbalance: the Appalachian Plateaus subregion consists of 177 counties, while another 74 are in the Valley and Ridge subregion. None of the other subregions, by contrast, contains more than 43 counties.)"	

== History ==
Beginning in about 1960, the Council of Appalachian Governors, a group of the ten governors of the Appalachian states of Alabama, Georgia, Kentucky, Maryland, North Carolina, South Carolina, Pennsylvania, Tennessee, Virginia, and West Virginia, united to seek federal government assistance for the mountainous portions of their states, which lagged behind the rest of the United States in income, education, health care, and transportation. During the 1960 Presidential campaign, candidate John F. Kennedy met with the governors to hear their concerns and observed living conditions in West Virginia that convinced him of the need for federal assistance to address the region's problems.

Unrest in the coal industry with movements like the Roving Pickets illustrated the need for federal government intervention in Appalachia. Another catalyst that helped lead to the creation of the ARC was the 1962 book Night Comes to the Cumberlands: A Biography of a Depressed Area by Harry M. Caudill on the poverty and history of the Cumberland area of Appalachia, predominantly in Kentucky. This book brought the situation in Appalachia to national attention.

In 1963 President Kennedy formed the President's Appalachian Regional Commission to assist in advancing legislation to bring federal dollars to Appalachia. This legislation, the Appalachian Redevelopment Act, was enacted by Congress in 1965, creating the ARC as a federal agency. It was signed into law by President Lyndon B. Johnson on March 9, 1965.

== Projects ==
All of ARC's activities must advance at least one of the five strategic investment goals articulated in its 2016–2020 strategic plan adopted in November 2015:

- creating economic opportunities,
- developing a ready workforce,
- investing in infrastructure, including the Appalachian Development Highway System,
- leveraging natural and cultural assets,
- and bolstering leadership and community capacity.

The bulk of ARC funds, which come from a federal appropriation, support grant making across a broad range of categories. All grants require performance measures. A regional research and evaluation program helps inform the agency's work. ARC emphasizes the leveraging of private-sector investments, relies on a broad network of public and private partnerships, and focuses on innovative, regional strategies to help communities help themselves. ARC targets its resources to the areas of greatest need, with at least half of its grants going to projects that benefit economically distressed areas and counties.

ARC's FY 2016 appropriation included $50 million in funding through the Partnerships for Opportunity and Workforce and Economic Revitalization (POWER) Initiative. This multi-agency initiative, launched in 2015, targets federal resources to help diversify economies in communities and regions that have been affected by job losses in coal mining, coal power plant operations, and coal-related supply chain industries due to the changing economics of America's energy production.

The Trump Administration's proposed budget for FY 2018 would have eliminated funding for the ARC. However, Senate Majority Leader Mitch McConnell assured constituents no funding would be cut from the ARC. In contrast, President Biden's first budget included $253,000,000 for the ARC. Biden's stimulus proposal budgeted an additional $5.3 Billion in direct aid to local governments in the Appalachian region. One of the ARC's Co-Chairs is also quoted as saying that Biden's proposed American Jobs Plan provides $1B in infrastructure repair to help distressed communities.

== Funding and community development ==
As mandated by Congress, ARC helps coordinate federal, state, and local initiatives to spur economic development^{[23]} in Appalachia. Each year, Congress appropriates funds, which ARC allocates among its member states. The Appalachian governors submit to ARC their state spending plans for the year, which include lists of projects they recommend for funding. The spending plans are reviewed and approved at a meeting of all the governors and the federal co-chair.

The next step is approval of individual projects by the ARC federal co-chair. After the states submit project applications to the ARC, each project is reviewed by ARC program analysts. The process is completed when the federal co-chair reviews a project and formally approves it.

ARC is designed as a federal-state partnership that employs a flexible "bottom up" approach, enabling local communities to tailor support to their individual needs. ARC relies on local regional planning agencies (local development districts) to develop effective strategies for local economic development. ARC has made investments in such essentials of comprehensive economic development as a safe and efficient highway system; education, job-training, and health care programs; water and sewer systems; and entrepreneurial and capital market development.

== Accomplishments ==
ARC has helped cut the number of high-poverty counties in Appalachia from 295 in 1960 to 91 in 2015, reduce the infant mortality rate by two-thirds, and double the percentage of high school graduates. From 2010 to 2015, ARC programs helped create or retain over 101,000 jobs in Appalachia through projects that include entrepreneurship, education and training, health care, telecommunications, business development, and basic infrastructure. Grants during that period leveraged almost $2.7 billion in private investments.

ARC commissioned a report on diseases of despair, which found that deaths due to drug overdose, suicide, and alcoholic liver disease were higher than average, especially in the parts of Appalachia under the most economic stress.

From September 1967 to 2008, the Commission published a magazine Appalachia (ISSN 0003-6595), which was bimonthly from September 1967 to the fall of 1986. Then it was quarterly between summer 1987 and summer/fall 1995, and annual from 2004 to 2008.

== See also ==
- Appalachian Mountains
- Delta Regional Authority
- Denali Commission
- List of Appalachian Regional Commission counties
- List of micro-regional organizations
- Northern Border Regional Commission
- Southeast Crescent Regional Commission
- Tennessee Valley Authority
- War on Poverty
