= Jennifer Clyburn Reed =

American businesswoman and schoolteacher

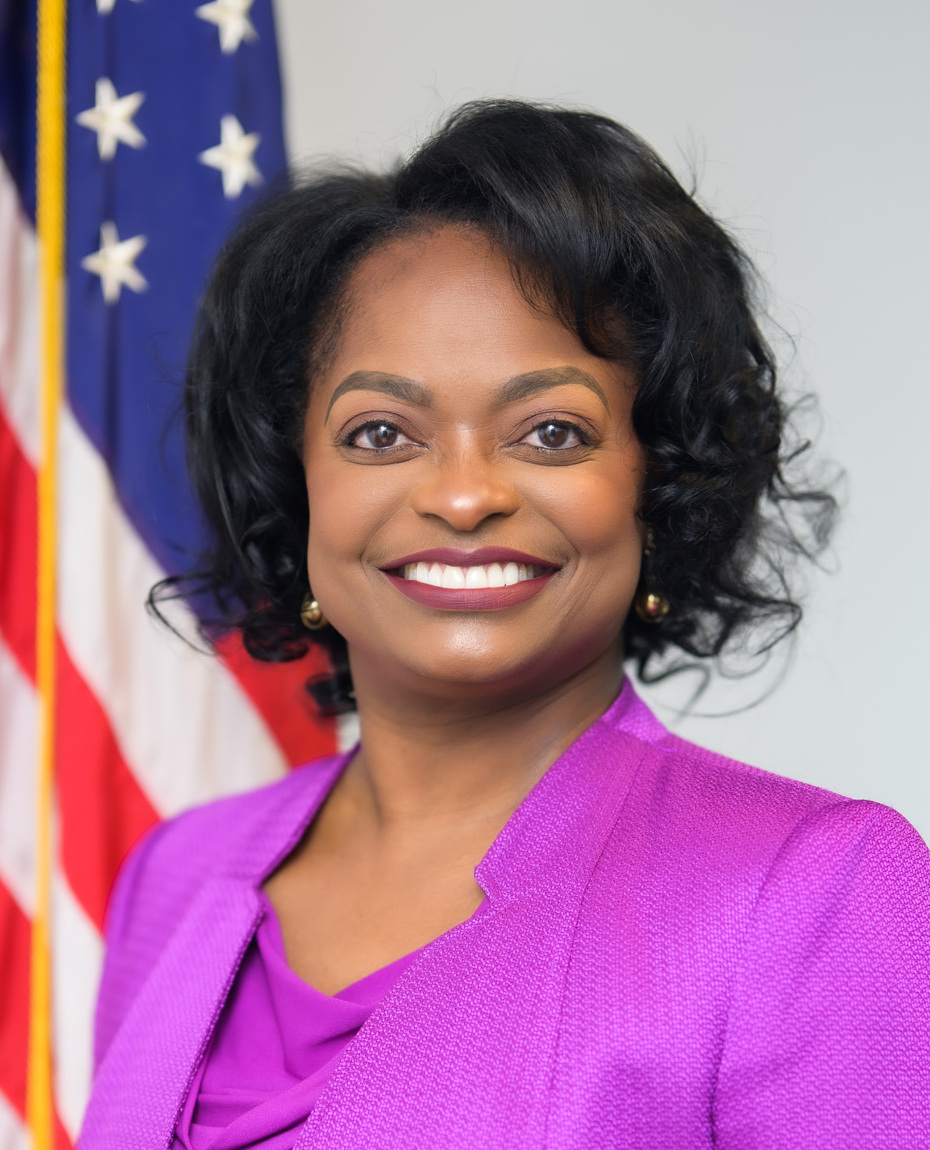

Federal Co-Chair of the Southeast Crescent Regional Commission
- Incumbent
- Assumed office December 9, 2021
- President: Joe Biden; Donald Trump
- Preceded by: Position established

Personal details
- Party: Democratic
- Spouse: Walter A. Reed
- Children: Walter A. Clyburn Reed
- Relatives: Jim Clyburn (father); Mignon Clyburn (sister)
- Education: University of South Carolina (BA, MAT, EdS); Nova Southeastern University (EdD)

Jennifer Clyburn Reed is an American businesswoman and retired schoolteacher. She served as the federal co-chair of the Southeast Crescent Regional Commission from 2021 to 2025. Reed is a co-owner of the 49 Magnolia investment property company and chief executive officer of the Palmetto Issues Conference. She was a schoolteacher for 28 years and served as director of the center for the education and equity of African American students at the University of South Carolina.

== Early life and education ==
Jennifer Clyburn Reed is the middle daughter of Emily England and Rep. Jim Clyburn, the Democratic U.S. representative for South Carolina's 6th congressional district since 1993. Her older sister is Mignon Clyburn. Reed majored in political science at University of South Carolina in the 1990s. She assisted Stephen K. Benjamin's campaign for student government president.

Reed is a three-time graduate of the University of South Carolina, earning Bachelor of Arts in political science, Master of Arts in Teaching and Education Specialist in teaching degrees. She also earned a Doctor of Education degree in educational leadership from Nova Southeastern University in Fort Lauderdale, Florida.

== Career ==
=== Education ===
Reed taught as an elementary and middle schoolteacher for 28 years. She taught and coordinated the Advancement Via Individual Determination (AVID) colleges preparatory system at Dent Middle School, a Richland County District 2 school. Reed was an education specialist for the South Carolina Department of Education and worked as a school district literacy coach for the South Carolina Reading Initiative. Reed also taught English language arts. By November 2020, she had retired as an educator. Reed also helped manage her father’s campaign in 2020 earning $45,000 campaign funds.

Until her retirement in 2021, Reed was director of the center for the education and equity of African American students at the University of South Carolina. She helped to design the Apple Core Initiative scholarship program for freshmen students at the University of South Carolina. Reed served on the selection committee for the Emily Clyburn Honors College Scholarship at the South Carolina State University.

=== Business and community advocacy ===
Reed co-owns the investment property company 49 Magnolia Blossom. Reed and her husband rented office space to Tom Steyer's 2020 presidential campaign. She is chief executive officer of the advisory group, Palmetto Issues Conference, aimed at advocating for equitable socioeconomic policies.

In November 2020, Reed filed plans with the city of Columbia, South Carolina to renovate the Alston House.

=== Politics ===
In 2020, Reed was a board member for Unite the Country PAC, a pro-Biden Super PAC, which was indicated as one of the Biden Campaign preferred Super PAC in the 2020 election.

In August 2021, U.S. President Joe Biden nominated Reed as federal co-chair of the Southeast Crescent Regional Commission. The U.S. Senate confirmed her appointment on December 9, 2021. In this role, Reed worked on economic and poverty issues in the Southeastern United States.

== Personal life ==
Reed is married to Mississippi native Walter A. Reed, and have two adult children, Walter A. Clyburn Reed and Sydney Reed Jackson.
