= Jim Clyburn =

American politician (born 1940)

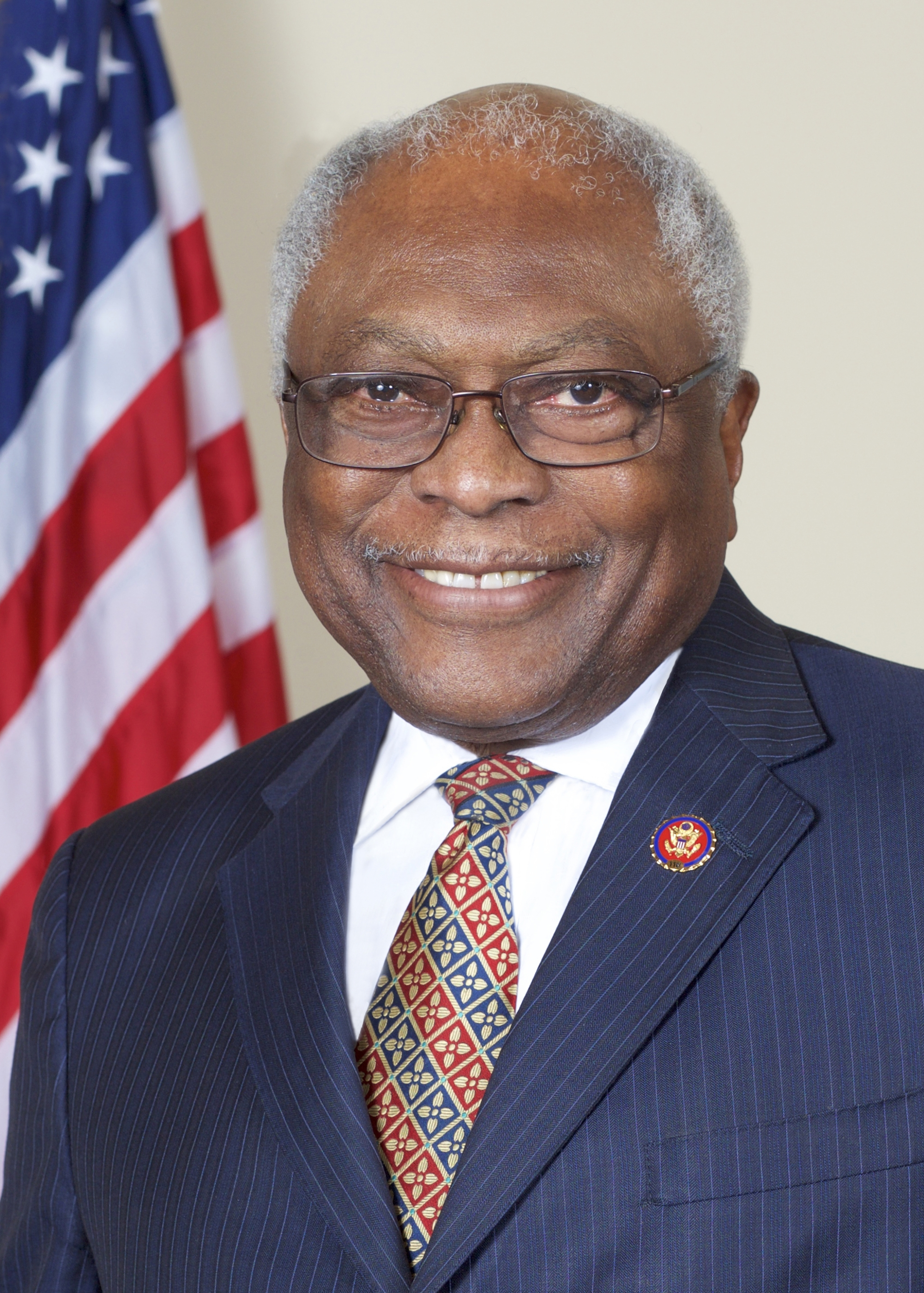
- Official portrait, 2019

Member of the U.S. House of Representatives from South Carolina's 6th district
- Incumbent
- Assumed office January 3, 1993
- Preceded by: Robin Tallon
House positions
House Assistant Democratic Leader
In office January 3, 2023 – March 20, 2024
Leader	Hakeem Jeffries
Preceded by	Katherine Clark (Assistant to the Speaker)
Succeeded by	Joe Neguse
In office January 3, 2011 – January 3, 2019
Leader	Nancy Pelosi
Preceded by	Chris Van Hollen (Assistant to the Leader)
Succeeded by	Ben Ray Luján (Assistant Speaker)
House Majority Whip
In office January 3, 2019 – January 3, 2023
Leader	Nancy Pelosi
Preceded by	Steve Scalise
Succeeded by	Tom Emmer
In office January 3, 2007 – January 3, 2011
Leader	Nancy Pelosi
Preceded by	Roy Blunt
Succeeded by	Kevin McCarthy
Chair of the House Democratic Caucus
In office January 16, 2006 – January 3, 2007
Leader	Nancy Pelosi
Preceded by	Bob Menendez
Succeeded by	Rahm Emanuel
Vice Chair of the House Democratic Caucus
In office January 3, 2003 – January 16, 2006
Leader	Nancy Pelosi
Preceded by	Bob Menendez
Succeeded by	John B. Larson

Personal details
- Born: James Enos Clyburn; July 21, 1940 (age 86) Sumter, South Carolina, U.S.
- Party: Democratic
- Spouse: Emily England (m. 1961; died 2019)
- Children: 3, including Mignon and Jennifer
- Education: South Carolina State University (BS)
- Awards: Presidential Medal of Freedom (2024)
- Website: House website Campaign website
- Clyburn's voice Clyburn on the death of Dorothy Height, civil rights leader. Recorded April 21, 2010

James Enos Clyburn (born July 21, 1940) is an American politician serving as the U.S. representative for South Carolina's 6th congressional district. First elected in 1992, Clyburn is serving his 17th term, representing a congressional district that includes most of the majority-black precincts in and around Columbia and Charleston, as well as most of the majority-black areas outside Beaufort and nearly all of South Carolina's share of the Black Belt. Since Joe Cunningham's departure in 2021, Clyburn has been the only Democrat in South Carolina's congressional delegation as well as the dean of the state's delegation since 2011 after fellow Democrat John Spratt lost re-election.

Clyburn was the third-ranking House Democrat, behind Nancy Pelosi and Steny Hoyer, from 2007 until 2023, serving as majority whip behind Pelosi and Hoyer during periods of Democratic House control, and as assistant Democratic leader behind Pelosi and Hoyer during periods of Republican control. He was majority whip from 2007 to 2011 and again from 2019 to 2023 and also House assistant Democratic leader from 2011 to 2019 and again from 2023 to 2024. After the Democrats took control of the House in the 2018 midterm elections, Clyburn was re-elected majority whip in January 2019 at the opening of the 116th Congress, alongside the reelected Speaker Pelosi and Majority Leader Hoyer, marking the second time the trio has served in these roles together.

In the 2022 midterm elections, Republicans gained control of the House, and Pelosi retired as leader of the House Democratic Caucus. In the 2022 United States House of Representatives Democratic Caucus leadership election, Clyburn successfully sought the position as House assistant Democratic leader, rather than that of Democratic whip.

Clyburn played a pivotal role in the 2020 presidential election by endorsing Joe Biden three days before the South Carolina Democratic primary. His endorsement came at a time when Biden's campaign had suffered three disappointing finishes in the Iowa and Nevada caucuses and the New Hampshire primary. Biden's South Carolina win three days before Super Tuesday transformed his campaign, helping him secure the Democratic nomination and later the presidency.

== Early life and education ==
Clyburn was born on July 21, 1940, in Sumter, South Carolina, the son of Enos Lloyd Clyburn, a fundamentalist minister, and his wife Almeta (née Dizzley), a beautician. A distant kinsman was George W. Murray, an organizer for the Colored Farmers Alliance (CFA), who was a Republican South Carolina Congressman in the 53rd and 54th U.S. Congresses in the late 19th century. He and other black politicians strongly opposed the 1895 state constitution, which essentially disenfranchised most African-American citizens, a situation the state maintained for more than half a century until federal civil rights legislation passed in the mid-1960s.

Clyburn graduated from Mather Academy (later named Boylan-Haven-Mather Academy) in Camden, South Carolina, then attended South Carolina State College (now South Carolina State University), a historically black college in Orangeburg. He joined the Omega Psi Phi fraternity and graduated with a baccalaureate in history.

In his first full-time position after college, Clyburn taught at C.A. Brown High School in Charleston, South Carolina.

== Early political career ==
Clyburn became involved in politics during the 1969 Charleston hospital strike. After assisting the settlement of the protests at the Medical University of South Carolina, he became involved in St. Julian Devine's campaign for a seat on the Charleston city council in 1969. Clyburn came up with the campaign's slogan, "Devine for Ward Nine". When Devine won the race, he became the first African American to hold a seat on the city council since Reconstruction. Clyburn later credited that campaign as the reason he got into electoral politics.

After an unsuccessful run for the South Carolina General Assembly, Clyburn moved to Columbia to join the staff of Governor John C. West in 1971. West offered Clyburn a job as his advisor after reading Clyburn's response to his loss in the newspaper. After West appointed Clyburn as his advisor, Clyburn became the first African American advisor to a governor in South Carolina since Reconstruction.

In the aftermath of the 1968 Orangeburg massacre, when police killed three protesting students at South Carolina State, West appointed Clyburn as the Commissioner of the South Carolina Human Affairs Commission. He served in this position until 1992, when he stepped down to run for Congress. The Orangeburg massacre and civil-rights protest predated the 1970 Kent State shootings and 1970 Jackson State killings, in which the National Guard at Kent State, and police and state highway patrol at Jackson State, killed student protesters demonstrating against the U.S. invasion of Cambodia during the Vietnam War.

== U.S. House of Representatives (1993–present) ==
=== Elections ===
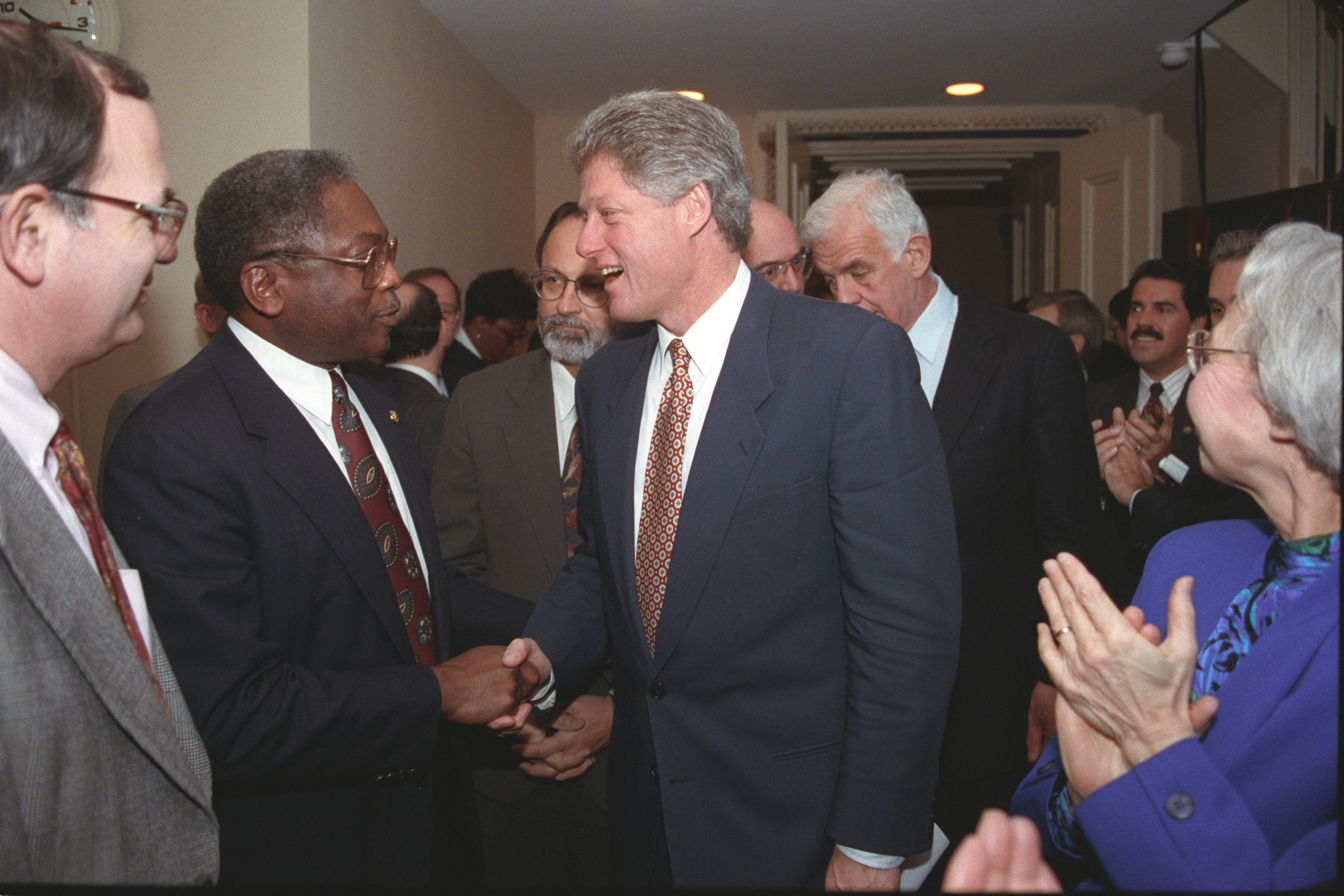
Clyburn greeting President Bill Clinton in 1993

After the 1990 census South Carolina's district lines were redrawn. Due to prior racial discrimination before the Voting Rights Act of 1965, the Supreme Court required the 6th district, which had previously included the northeastern portion of the state, to be redrawn as a black-majority district. The 6th was reconfigured to take in most of the majority-black areas near Columbia and Charleston, as well as most of the Black Belt. Five-term incumbent Robin Tallon's home in Florence stayed in the district, but he chose to retire. Five candidates, all of whom were African American, ran for the Democratic nomination for the seat. Clyburn's campaign was led by NAACP activist Isaac W. Williams.

Clyburn won 55% of the vote in the primary, eliminating the need for a runoff. As expected, he won the general election in November handily, becoming the first Democrat to represent a significant portion of Columbia since 1965 and the first Democrat to represent a significant portion of Charleston since 1981. He was the first African-American to represent South Carolina in Congress since George W. Murray in 1893. He has been reelected 16 times.

For his first 10 terms, Clyburn represented a district that stretched from the Pee Dee through most of South Carolina's share of the Black Belt, but swept west to include most of the majority-black precincts in and around Columbia and south to include most of the majority-black precincts in and around Charleston. After the 2010 census, the district was pushed well to the south, losing its portion of the Pee Dee while picking up almost all of the majority-black precincts near Beaufort and Hilton Head Island (though not taking in any of Beaufort or Hilton Head themselves). The reconfigured 6th was no less Democratic than its predecessor. In all its incarnations as a gerrymandered black-majority district, it has been dominated by black voters in the Columbia and Charleston areas, and for much of that time has been the only safe Democratic district in the state.

In 2008, Clyburn defeated Nancy Harrelson, 68% to 32%. In 2010, he defeated Jim Pratt, 65% to 34%. In 2012, Clyburn defeated Anthony Culler, 73% to 25%.

In March 2024, Clyburn announced his run for re-election. Duke Buckner, who ran against Clyburn in 2022, defeated Justin Scott in the June Republican Primary. Gregg Marcel Dixon, who ran against Clyburn as a Democrat in 2022, switched to the United Citizens Party for his 2024 run for the seat. Alliance Party candidate Joseph Oddo and Libertarian candidate Michael Simpson have also filed for the seat. In November 2024, Clyburn won re-election with 59.5% of the vote.

On March 12, 2026, Clyburn announced his run for re-election; he will face Republican John Peterson in November.

Clyburn ranked number 19 on the Post and Courier Columbia's 2025 Power List.

==== South Carolina redistricting ====
In 2023, ProPublica reported that Clyburn secretly worked with South Carolina Republicans during the 2020 Congressional redistricting process to dilute the state's Black vote. The resulting Congressional map made Democrats "have virtually no shot of winning any congressional seat in South Carolina other than Clyburn’s." The NAACP, in 2022, challenged the South Carolina's redistricting as an unconstitutional racial gerrymander, alleging that Republicans deliberately moved Black voters into Clyburn’s district to solidify Republican control over a neighboring swing district. A spokesperson for Clyburn denied "any accusation that Congressman Clyburn in any way enabled or facilitated Republican gerrymandering." The NAACP case, filed as Alexander v. South Carolina State Conference of the NAACP, was argued on October 11, 2023, in the Supreme Court and a ruling siding with the State was made in the 2024 term.

=== Tenure ===
==== Party leadership ====
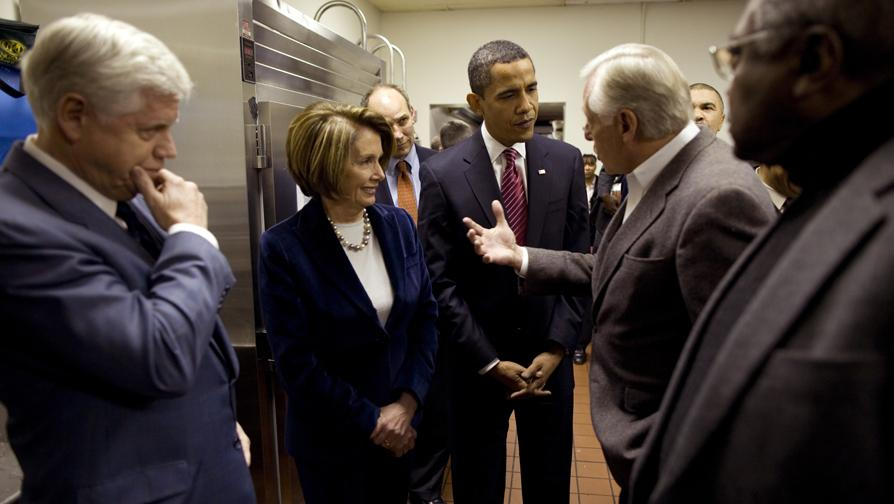
Clyburn with President Barack Obama as he meets with House leaders in 2009

Clyburn was elected vice-chairman of the House Democratic Caucus in 2002, the caucus's third-ranking post. He became chair of the House Democratic Caucus in early 2006 after caucus chair Bob Menendez was appointed to the Senate. After the Democrats won control of the House in the 2006 election, Clyburn was unanimously elected Majority Whip in the 110th Congress.

Clyburn would have faced a challenge from Democratic Congressional Campaign Committee chair Rahm Emanuel, but Speaker-elect Nancy Pelosi persuaded Emanuel to run for Democratic Caucus chair. Clyburn was interviewed by National Public Radio's Morning Edition on January 12, 2007, and acknowledged the difficulty of counting votes and rallying the fractious Democratic caucus while his party held the House majority.

In the 2010 elections, the Democrats lost their House majority. Pelosi ran for Minority Leader in order to remain the House party leader, while Clyburn announced that he would challenge Steny Hoyer, the second-ranking House Democrat and outgoing Majority Leader, for Minority Whip. Clyburn had the support of the Congressional Black Caucus, which wanted to keep an African-American in the House leadership, while Hoyer had 35 public endorsements, including three standing committee chairs. On November 13, Pelosi announced a deal whereby Hoyer would remain Minority Whip, while a "number three" leadership position styled Assistant Leader would be created for Clyburn. The exact responsibilities of Clyburn's assistant leader office were unclear, though it was said to replace the Assistant to the Leader post previously held by Chris Van Hollen, who had attended all leadership meetings but was not in the leadership hierarchy.

On November 28, 2018, Clyburn was elected to serve his second stint as House Majority Whip.

== Political views and ideology ==
Clyburn is regarded as liberal in his political stances, actions and votes. In 2007 the National Journal ranked him the 77th most liberal U.S. representative, with a score of 81, indicating that the conductors of this study found his voting record to be more liberal than 81% of other House members, based on their recent voting records. Clyburn identifies as a progressive, but thinks the Democratic Party's more liberal wing should be "practical," and that liberalism and conservatism have to be balanced out. Various progressives have called him "conservative" and "centrist".

Clyburn has established liberal stances on health care, education, organized labor and environmental conservation issues, based on his legislative actions as well as evaluations and ratings by pertinent interest groups.

=== Healthcare ===
In 2009, Clyburn introduced the Access for All Americans Act. The $26 billion sought by the Act would provide funding to quadruple the number of community health centers in the US that provide medical care to uninsured and low-income citizens.

The American Public Health Association, the American Academy of Family Physicians, The Children’s Health Fund, and other health care interest groups rate Clyburn highly based on his voting record on pertinent issues. Other groups in this field, such as the American College of Obstetricians and Gynecologists, gave Clyburn a rating of zero in 2014.

Despite his opposition to partial-birth abortion, Clyburn is regarded as pro-abortion rights, as shown by his high ratings from Planned Parenthood and NARAL Pro-Choice America and low rating from the National Right to Life Committee. But at the height of national polarization after the Supreme Court's intention to overturn Roe v. Wade had been leaked, Clyburn campaigned on behalf of anti-abortion incumbent Representative Henry Cuellar, who faced a pro-choice primary challenger.

=== Education ===
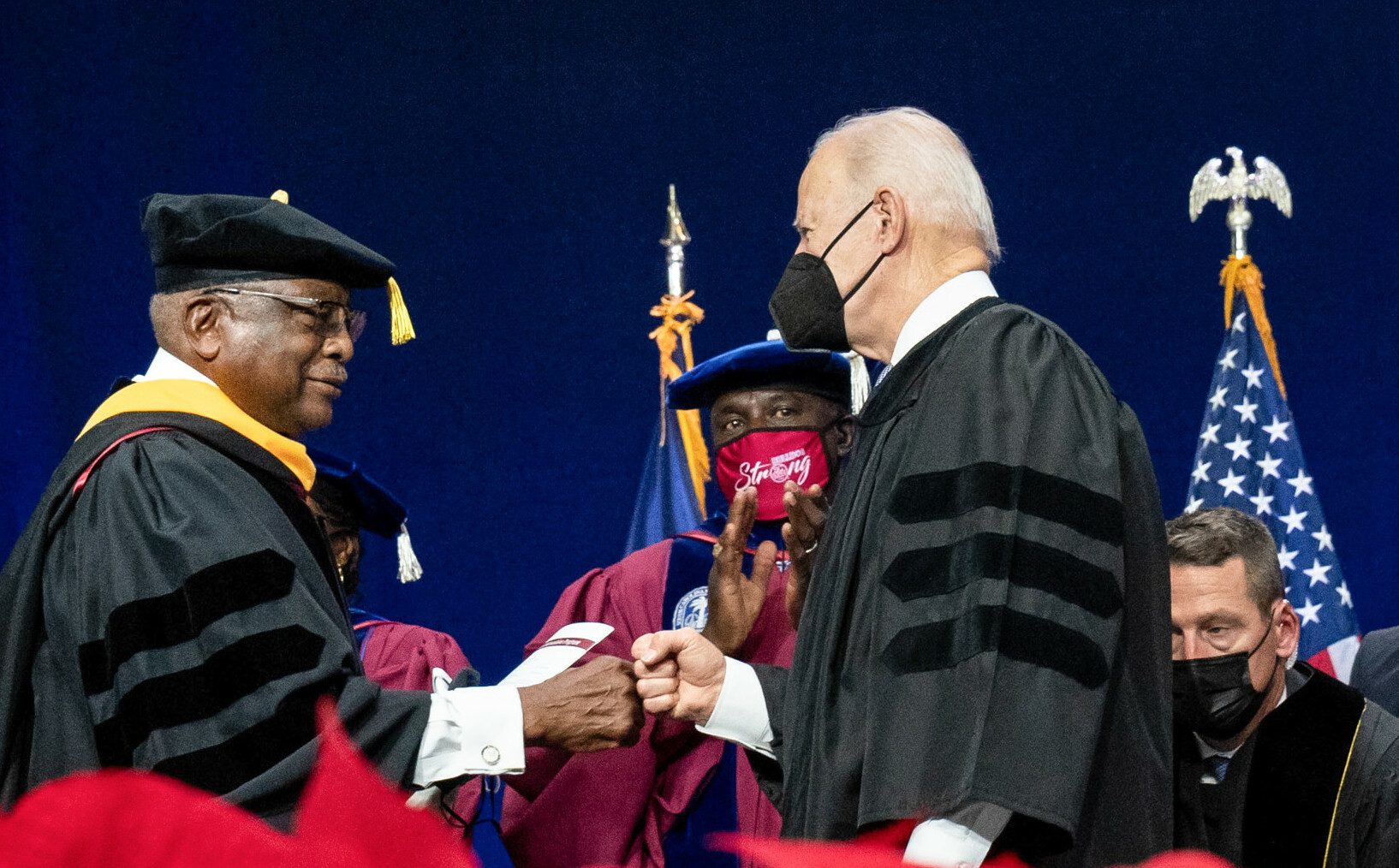
Clyburn (left) at South Carolina State University with President Joe Biden in 2021

Clyburn has continuously sought new and additional funding for education. He has gained additional funding for special education and lower interest rates on federal student loans. In many sessions Clyburn has sought, sponsored and/or voted for improvements in Pell Grant funding for college loans.

The National Education Association and the National Association of Elementary School Principals rate Clyburn very highly, as do other education interest groups.

=== Ports ===
Although he was criticized for a previous expenditure of 160 million dollars to expand South Carolina's ports, Clyburn said he would continue to make funding available for further expansions. The plan is to deepen the ports to allow for larger commercial ships to arrive from the Panama Canal, which is being expanded to allow for larger ships to pass through. This is primarily because of larger commercial ships from China, and China's extremely high demand for soybeans, which are produced in South Carolina but must be sent to larger ports for exporting. This measure will benefit South Carolina business and farmers and is thus heavily backed by these groups.

=== Labor ===
Clyburn has consistently voted for increases in minimum wage income and to restrict employer interference with labor union organization.

Many national labor unions, including the AFL-CIO, the United Auto Workers, the Communication Workers Association, and the International Brotherhood of Boilermakers, give Clyburn outstanding ratings based on his voting record on issues that pertain to labor and employment.

=== Environment ===
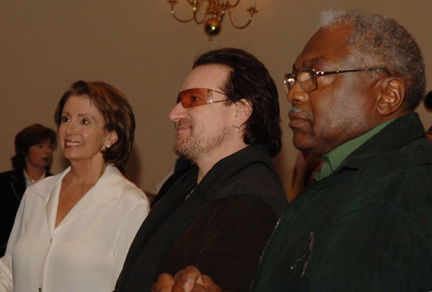
Clyburn with Nancy Pelosi and U2 lead singer Bono in 2006

Clyburn has opposed legislation to increase offshore drilling for oil or natural gas. Instead, he has promoted use of nuclear energy as a cheaper alternative to fossil fuels than wind and solar energy. Members of the nuclear power industry have said that there is mutual respect between Clyburn and themselves. Clyburn pushed for a 2010 contract to convert plutonium from old weapons into nuclear fuel.

Organizations such as the League of Conservation Voters and Defenders of Wildlife have viewed Clyburn favorably, but he angered environmentalists when he proposed building a $150 million bridge across a swampy area of Lake Marion in Calhoun County.

=== Objection to the 2004 presidential election ===
Clyburn was one of 31 House Democrats who voted not to count Ohio's 20 electoral votes in the 2004 presidential election. George W. Bush won Ohio by 118,457 votes. Without Ohio's electoral votes, the election would have been decided by the U.S. House of Representatives, with each state having one vote in accordance with the Twelfth Amendment to the United States Constitution.

=== War in Iraq ===
On July 31, 2007, Clyburn said in a broadcast interview that it would be a "real big problem" for the Democratic Party if General David Petraeus issued a positive report in September, as it would split the Democratic caucus on whether to continue to fund the Iraq War. While this soundbite caused some controversy, the full quote was, in reference to the 47-member Blue Dog caucus, "I think there would be enough support in that group to want to stay the course and if the Republicans were to stay united as they have been, then it would be a problem for us."

=== Bill Clinton comments ===
Clyburn was officially neutral during the 2008 primary battle between Hillary Clinton and Barack Obama, but former President Bill Clinton blamed Clyburn for Hillary's 29-point defeat in the South Carolina primary and the two of them had a heated telephone conversation. Clyburn had voted for Obama, saying, "How could I ever look in the faces of our children and grandchildren had I not voted for Barack Obama?" He negatively viewed Bill Clinton's remarks about Obama winning the South Carolina primary. Clinton had compared Obama's victory to Jesse Jackson's win in the 1988 primary. "Black people are incensed all over this", Clyburn said. Clinton responded that the campaign "played the race card on me", denying any racial tone in the comment. Speaking to The New York Times, Clyburn said such actions could lead to a longtime division between Clinton and his once most reliable constituency. "When he was going through his impeachment problems, it was the black community that bellied up to the bar", Clyburn said. "I think black folks feel strongly that this is a strange way for President Clinton to show his appreciation."

=== Impeachments of Bill Clinton and Donald Trump ===
On December 19, 1998, Clyburn voted against all four articles of impeachment against President Bill Clinton. On December 18, 2019, Clyburn voted for both articles of impeachment against President Donald Trump. On January 13, 2021, one week after the January 6 United States Capitol attack, Clyburn voted for the single article of impeachment against Trump.

=== Israel–Palestine conflict ===
In January 2017, Clyburn voted against a House resolution condemning the UN Security Council Resolution 2334, which called Israeli settlement building in the occupied Palestinian territories in the West Bank a "flagrant violation" of international law and a major obstacle to peace. He voted to provide Israel with support following October 7 attacks.

=== Homosexuality and same-sex marriage ===
In 1996, Clyburn voted in favor of the Defense of Marriage Act. The act restricted federal recognition of marriage to the union of a man and a woman, and explicitly granted states the power not to introduce same-sex marriage and refuse to acknowledge same-sex marriages granted under the laws of other states. The House Judiciary Committee had explicitly said the act was meant to "express moral disapproval of homosexuality". The act passed by an 85-vote majority in the Senate and was signed into law by President Bill Clinton.

In 2012, after Obama's public endorsement of same-sex marriage, Clyburn said in an interview that he too supported same-sex marriage. In the interview, he said his former disapproval was rooted in his Christian faith, but that he had since "evolved". Clyburn called for nationwide legislation of marriage equality, opposing Obama's state-by-state approach, saying, "if you consider this to be a civil right—and I do—I don't think civil rights ought to be left up to a state-by-state approach".

During the 2020 Democratic presidential primaries, when considering an endorsement, Clyburn cited Pete Buttigieg's sexual orientation as an issue, saying it was "no question" that his sexuality would hurt his popularity and that "[he] knew a lot of people [his] age that felt that way." Clyburn added, "I'm not going to sit here and tell you otherwise, because I think everybody knows that's an issue." In the wake of his comments, then-candidate Kamala Harris dismissed his comments as "nonsense" and "a trope" of the African American community, but the Benson Strategy Group reported that "being gay was a barrier for these voters, particularly for the men who seemed uncomfortable discussing it."

=== Donald Trump felony indictments ===
In 2024, Clyburn said he would support President Joe Biden pardoning Donald Trump for Trump's felony indictments.

=== Committee assignments ===
For the 119th Congress:

- Committee on Appropriations
  - Subcommittee on Energy and Water Development and Related Agencies
  - Subcommittee on Interior, Environment, and Related Agencies
  - Subcommittee on Transportation, Housing and Urban Development, and Related Agencies (Ranking Member)

=== Caucus memberships ===
- Black Maternal Health Caucus
- Congressional Black Caucus
- House Democratic Caucus
- United States Congressional International Conservation Caucus
- Congressional Arts Caucus
- Congressional Cement Caucus
- United States–China Working Group

== Presidential endorsements ==
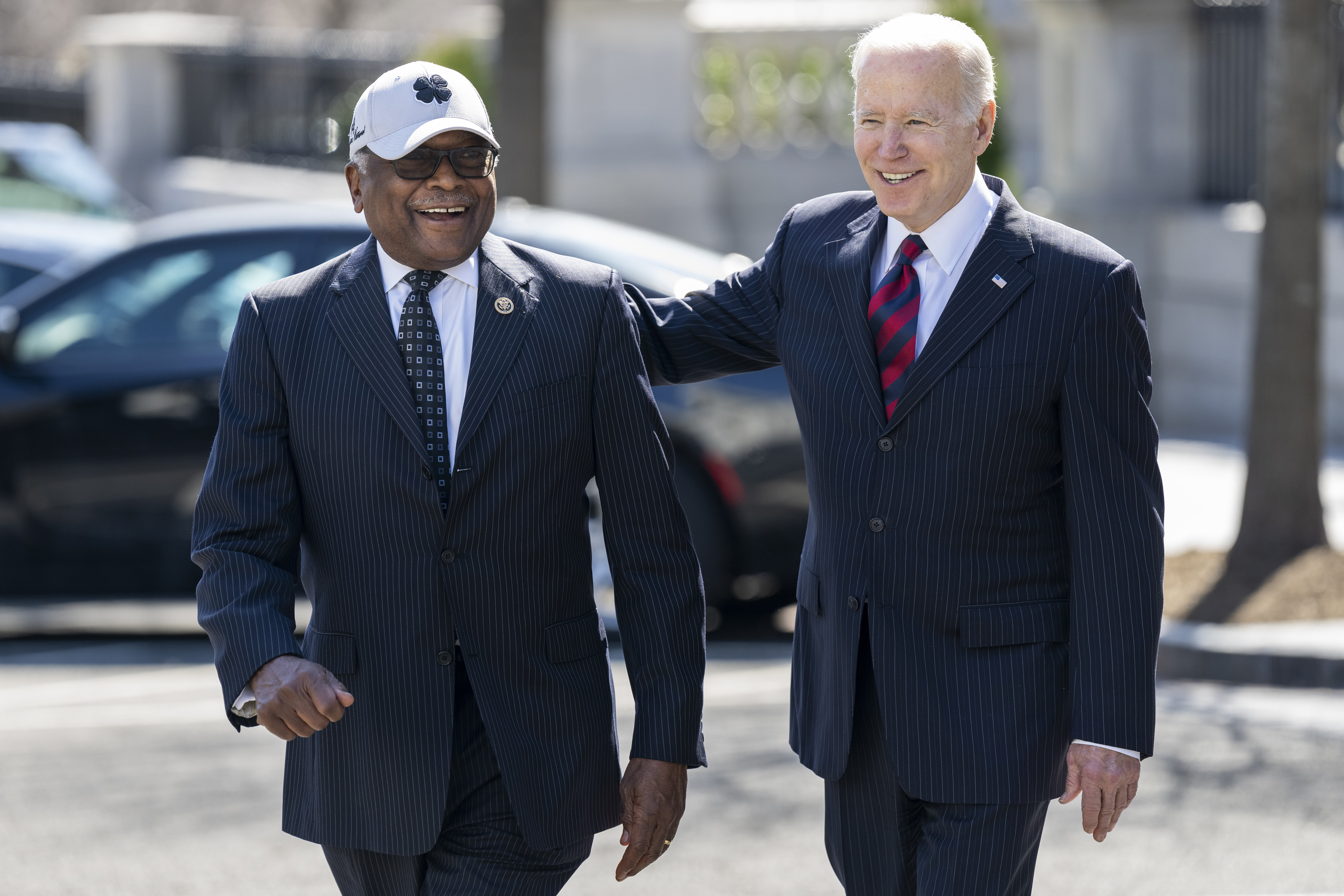
Clyburn with President Joe Biden in 2022

Clyburn is considered a power broker in South Carolina. For almost 30 years, he has hosted an annual fish fry "that every four years becomes a must-attend event for presidential hopefuls."

During the 2004 Democratic presidential primaries, Clyburn supported former House Minority Leader Dick Gephardt until he dropped out of the race and then supported John Kerry. Clyburn was one of the 31 who voted in the House not to count Ohio's electoral votes in the 2004 presidential election amid a dispute over irregularities.

Like other Democratic congressional leaders, Clyburn remained publicly uncommitted throughout most of the 2008 presidential primary elections. Despite being officially neutral, Clyburn voted for Obama in the South Carolina primary. Former President Bill Clinton accused Clyburn of being responsible for Hillary's 29-point defeat in South Carolina, while Clyburn criticized Bill Clinton's comments on race comparing Obama's win to that of Jesse Jackson. Clyburn endorsed Obama on June 3, immediately before the Montana and South Dakota primaries. By that time, Obama's lead in pledged delegates was substantial enough that those two primaries could not undo it.

Clyburn endorsed Hillary Clinton in the 2016 presidential campaign.

Clyburn's endorsement of Joe Biden on February 26, 2020, three days before the South Carolina primary, was considered pivotal in the 2020 Democratic presidential primaries. Several analyses have determined the endorsement changed the trajectory of the race, due to Clyburn's influence over the state's African-Americans, who make up the majority of its Democratic electorate. Until Clyburn's endorsement, Biden had not won a single primary and had placed fourth, fifth, and a distant second in the Iowa, New Hampshire, and Nevada caucuses and primaries, respectively. Three days after the South Carolina primary, Biden took a delegate lead on Super Tuesday, and a month later he clinched the nomination. Biden went on to win the 2020 presidential election. Clyburn's endorsement of Biden, and subsequent political endorsements in later Democratic primaries, have given him a reputation as a political "kingmaker".

In 2024, amidst calls from other Democrats for Biden to withdraw from his 2024 presidential campaign, Clyburn stated his support for Biden, but also that he would back Vice President Kamala Harris as the Democratic presidential candidate if Biden were to withdraw, which eventually came to happen.

== Controversies ==
Clyburn was identified by ProPublica as having been investigated by the FBI for bribery, though the case and prosecution were ended when the FBI's public corruption squad was disbanded.. The investigation reportedly centered around appropriations designed to favour contractor Navatek, in exchange for a $100,000 donation to his campaign and a $10,000 donation to Clyburn's alma mater.

== Electoral history ==
South Carolina's 6th congressional district results, 1992
Primary election
Party	Candidate	Votes	%
Democratic	Jim Clyburn	41,415	56.11
Democratic	Frank Gilbert	11,089	15.02
Democratic	Ken Mosely	9,494	12.86
Democratic	Herbert Fielding	9,130	12.37
Democratic	John Roy Harper II	2,680	3.63
Total votes		73,808	100
General election
Democratic	Jim Clyburn	120,647	65.26
Republican	John Chase	64,149	34.70
Write-in		75	0.04
Total votes		184,871	100
Democratic hold			

South Carolina's 6th congressional district results, 1994
Primary election
Party	Candidate	Votes	%
Democratic	Jim Clyburn (incumbent)	50,476	85.71
Democratic	Ben Frasier	8,419	14.29
Total votes		58,895	100
General election
Democratic	Jim Clyburn (incumbent)	88,635	63.80
Republican	Gary McLeod	50,259	36.18
Write-in		29	0.02
Total votes		138,923	100
Democratic hold			

South Carolina's 6th congressional district results, 1996
Primary election
Party	Candidate	Votes	%
Democratic	Jim Clyburn (incumbent)	50,933	87.75
Democratic	Ben Frasier	7,107	12.25
Total votes		58,040	100
General election
Democratic	Jim Clyburn (incumbent)	120,132	69.41
Republican	Gary McLeod	51,974	30.03
Natural Law	Savitap Joshi	948	0.55
Write-in		26	0.02
Total votes		173,080	100
Democratic hold			

South Carolina's 6th congressional district results, 1998
Primary election
Party	Candidate	Votes	%
Democratic	Jim Clyburn (incumbent)	32,652	83.07
Democratic	Mike Wilson	6,655	16.93
Total votes		39,307	100
General election
Democratic	Jim Clyburn (incumbent)	116,507	72.56
Republican	Gary McLeod	41,421	25.80
Natural Law	George C. Taylor	2,496	1.55
Write-in		152	0.09
Total votes		173,080	100
Democratic hold			

South Carolina's 6th congressional district results, 2000
Party	Candidate	Votes	%
Democratic	Jim Clyburn (incumbent)	138,053	71.76
Republican	Vince Ellison	50,005	25.99
Natural Law	Dianne Nevins	2,339	1.22
Libertarian	Lynwood Hines	1,934	1.01
Write-in		49	0.03
Total votes		192,380	100
Democratic hold			

South Carolina's 6th congressional district results, 2002
Primary election
Party	Candidate	Votes	%
Democratic	Jim Clyburn (incumbent)	34,106	88.79
Democratic	Ben Frasier	4,304	11.21
Total votes		38,410	100
General election
Democratic	Jim Clyburn (incumbent)	115,855	66.95
Republican	Gary McLeod	55,490	32.07
Libertarian	R. Craig Augenstein	1,662	0.96
Write-in		40	0.02
Total votes		173,047	100
Democratic hold			

South Carolina's 6th congressional district results, 2004
Party	Candidate	Votes	%
Democratic	Jim Clyburn (incumbent)	161,987	66.98
Republican	Gary McLeod	75,443	31.20
Constitution	Gary McLeod	4,157	1.72
Total	Gary McLeod	79,600	32.92
Write-in		242	0.10
Total votes		241,829	100
Democratic hold			

South Carolina's 6th congressional district results, 2006
Party	Candidate	Votes	%
Democratic	Jim Clyburn (incumbent)	100,213	64.36
Republican	Gary McLeod	53,181	34.15
Green	Antonio Williams	2,224	1.43
Write-in		88	0.06
Total votes		155,706	100%
Democratic hold			

South Carolina's 6th congressional district results, 2008
Party	Candidate	Votes	%
Democratic	Jim Clyburn (incumbent)	193,378	67.48
Republican	Nancy Harrelson	93,059	32.47
Write-in		134	0.05
Total votes		286,571	100
Democratic hold			

South Carolina's 6th congressional district results, 2010
Primary election
Party	Candidate	Votes	%
Democratic	Jim Clyburn (incumbent)	50,138	90.07
Democratic	Gregory Brown	5,527	9.93
Total votes		55,665	100
General election
Democratic	Jim Clyburn (incumbent)	125,459	62.86
Republican	Jim Pratt	72,661	36.41
Green	Nammu Muhammad	1,389	0.70
Write-in		81	0.04
Total votes		199,590	100
Democratic hold			

South Carolina's 6th congressional district results, 2012
Party	Candidate	Votes	%
Democratic	Jim Clyburn (incumbent)	218,717	93.62
Green	Nammu Muhammad	12,920	5.53
Write-in		1,978	0.85
Total votes		233,615	100
Democratic hold			

South Carolina's 6th congressional district results, 2014
Primary election
Party	Candidate	Votes	%
Democratic	Jim Clyburn (incumbent)	37,429	85.98
Democratic	Karen Smith	6,101	14.02
Total votes		43,530	100
General election
Democratic	Jim Clyburn (incumbent)	125,747	72.51
Republican	Anthony Culler	44,311	25.55
Libertarian	Kevin Umbaugh	3,176	1.83
Write-in		198	0.11
Total votes		173,432	100
Democratic hold			

South Carolina's 6th congressional district results, 2016
Party	Candidate	Votes	%
Democratic	Jim Clyburn (incumbent)	177,947	70.09
Republican	Laura Sterling	70,099	27.61
Libertarian	Rich Piotrowski	3,131	1.23
Green	Prince Charles Mallory	2,499	0.98
Write-in		225	0.09
Total votes		253,901	100
Democratic hold			

South Carolina's 6th congressional district results, 2018
Party	Candidate	Votes	%
Democratic	Jim Clyburn (incumbent)	144,765	70.13
Republican	Gerhard Gressmann	58,282	28.23
Green	Bryan Pugh	3,214	1.56
Write-in		172	0.08
Total votes		206,433	100
Democratic hold			

South Carolina's 6th congressional district results, 2020
Party	Candidate	Votes	%
Democratic	Jim Clyburn (incumbent)	197,477	68.18
Republican	John McCollum	89,258	30.82
Constitution	Mark Hackett	2,646	0.91
Write-in		272	0.09
Total votes		289,653	100
Democratic hold			

South Carolina's 6th congressional district results, 2022
Primary election
Party	Candidate	Votes	%
Democratic	Jim Clyburn (incumbent)	48,729	87.90
Democratic	Michael Addison	4,203	7.58
Democratic	Gregg Dixon	2,503	4.52
Total votes		55,435	100
General election
Democratic	Jim Clyburn (incumbent)	130,923	62.04
Republican	Duke Buckner	79,879	37.85
Write-in		226	0.11
Total votes		211,028	100
Democratic hold			

South Carolina's 6th congressional district results, 2024
Party	Candidate	Votes	%
Democratic	Jim Clyburn (incumbent)	182,056	59.50
Republican	Duke Buckner	112,360	36.72
Libertarian	Michael Simpson	5,279	1.73
United Citizens	Gregg Dixon	4,927	1.61
Alliance	Joseph Oddo	1,056	0.35
Write-in		299	0.10
Total votes		305,977	100
Democratic hold			

South Carolina's 6th congressional district results, 2026
Primary election
Party	Candidate	Votes	%
Democratic	Jim Clyburn (incumbent)	75,411	90.25
Democratic	Frederick Goodwin	8,145	9.75
Total votes		83,556	100

== Personal life ==
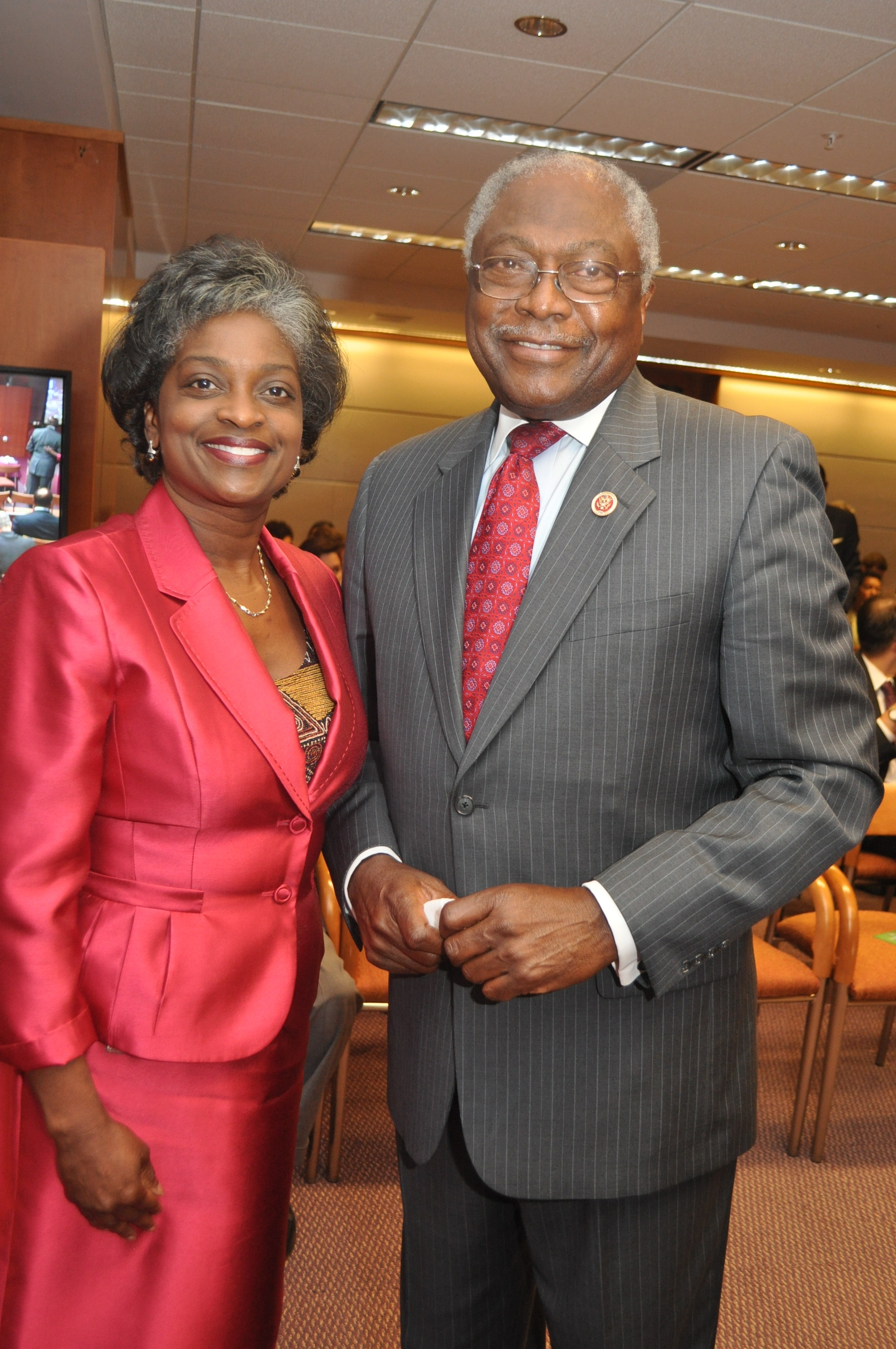
Clyburn with his daughter Mignon in 2013

Clyburn was married to librarian Emily England Clyburn from 1961 until her death in 2019. They had three daughters; their eldest, Mignon Clyburn, was appointed to the Federal Communications Commission by President Barack Obama, and their second daughter, Jennifer Clyburn Reed, was appointed as federal co-chair of the newly formed Southeast Crescent Regional Commission. Their third daughter, Angela Clyburn, is Political Director for the South Carolina Democratic Party and a member of Richland County District One School Board. In 2024, Clyburn was awarded the Presidential Medal of Freedom by President Joe Biden.

== See also ==
- List of African-American United States representatives

U.S. House of Representatives
Preceded by Robin Tallon	Member of the U.S. House of Representatives from South Carolina's 6th congressional district 1993–present	Incumbent
Preceded by Maxine Waters	Chair of the Congressional Black Caucus; 1999–2001	Succeeded by Eddie Bernice Johnson
Preceded by Roy Blunt	House Majority Whip; 2007–2011	Succeeded by Kevin McCarthy
Preceded by Steve Scalise	House Majority Whip; 2019–2023	Succeeded by Tom Emmer
Party political offices
Preceded by Bob Menendez	Vice Chair of the House Democratic Caucus; 2003–2006	Succeeded by John B. Larson
Preceded by Bob Menendez	Chair of the House Democratic Caucus; 2006–2007	Succeeded by Rahm Emanuel
Preceded by Chris Van Hollen as House Democratic Assistant to the Leader	House Assistant Democratic Leader; 2011–2019	Succeeded by Ben Ray Luján as Assistant Speaker of the House of Representatives
Preceded by Katherine Clark as Assistant Speaker of the House of Representatives	House Assistant Democratic Leader; 2023–2024	Succeeded by Joe Neguse
U.S. order of precedence (ceremonial)
Preceded by Ken Calvert	United States representatives by seniority 13th	Succeeded by Bobby Scott
Preceded by Jerry Nadler	Order of precedence of the United States	Succeeded by Bobby Scott
