= Alston House =

Alston House may refer to:

- Alston-Cobb House, Grove Hill, Alabama, listed on the National Register of Historic Places (NRHP) in Clarke County
- Dr. Lucius Charles Alston House, Mesa, Arizona, listed on the NRHP in Maricopa County
- Robert A. Alston House, Atlanta, Georgia, listed on the NRHP in DeKalb County
- Smith-Alston House, Richland, Georgia, listed on the NRHP in Stewart County
- Alston House (Glendon, North Carolina), listed on the NRHP in Moore County
- Alston-DeGraffenried Plantation, Pittsboro, North Carolina, listed on the NRHP in Chatham County
- Alston-Bedwell House, Tahlequah, Oklahoma, listed on the NRHP in Cherokee County
- Alston House (Columbia, South Carolina), listed on the NRHP in Richland County
- Emanuel Alston House, Frogmore, South Carolina, listed on the NRHP in Beaufort County
