= List of Appalachian Regional Commission counties =

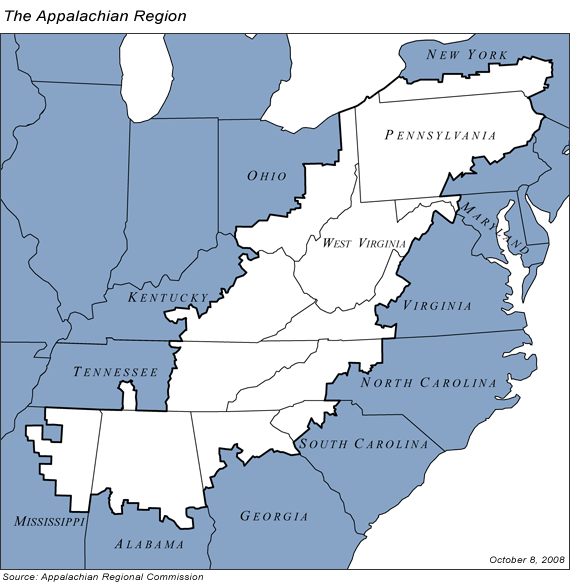
Counties included within the Appalachian Regional Commission's charter.

The following list contains the 420 counties and eight independent cities that comprise the region of Appalachia as defined by the Appalachian Regional Commission. The ARC was established by the United States federal government in 1965 to alleviate poverty in the Appalachian region, and currently monitors areas in 13 states.

The list shows the population of each county as of the 2000 U.S. Census; cities in Virginia, which are legally independent of counties, are included within the county with which they were historically associated. It also gives the following four variables:

- 3-year average unemployment rate, based on data collected 2006–2008
- Per capita market income, as of 2007
- Poverty rate, showing what percentage of the county lives below the national poverty rate, as of 2000
- Status, the ARC's economic status designation for the county, based on the three variables above. There are five possible designations:
  - Distressed — these counties have at least twice the national poverty rate and have a per capita market income 67% of the national average or a three-year average unemployment rate that is twice the national average.
  - At-Risk — these counties meet two of the following three criteria: 1) 3-year unemployment rate 125% of the national average, 2) per capita market income 67% or less of national average, or 3) poverty rate of 125% or more of the national average
  - Transitional — these counties are worse than the national average on at least one of the three indicators, but do not meet criteria for "At-Risk" or "Distressed"
  - Competitive — these counties have a three-year unemployment rate and poverty rate at least equal to the national average, and a per capita market income at least 80% of the national average
  - Attainment — these counties are at least equal to the national average on all three indicators. To date, only six counties meet Attainment status, with five of them between Alabama and Georgia; the three that are in Georgia (Cherokee, Forsyth, and Gwinnett) are all part of the Atlanta metropolitan area. The other county that has reached Attainment status, as of 2013, is in Virginia.

The national 3-year average unemployment rate for the United States was 5.0% in the period 2006–2008. The national per capita market income was $32,930 in 2007. The national poverty rate was 12.4% in 2000. The 3-year average unemployment rate for the Appalachian region in 2006-2008 was 5.2%. The region's per capita market income in 2007 was $24,360. The region's poverty rate was 13.6%.

Alabama's Appalachian counties led all states' Appalachian counties in unemployment (3.8%) and per capita market income ($27,723). Georgia's Appalachian counties had the lowest average poverty rate (9.2%). Mississippi's Appalachian counties had the highest average unemployment rate at 7.9%, while Kentucky's Appalachian counties had the lowest average per capita market income ($15,690) and the highest average poverty rate (24.4%).

== Alabama ==
County	Population	Unemployment Rate	Market Income Per Capita	Poverty Rate	Status
Bibb	21,482	4.1%	$16,886	20.6%	At-Risk
Blount	56,436	3.2%	$19,354	11.7%	Transitional
Calhoun	112,903	4.0%	$24,157	16.1%	Transitional
Chambers	35,176	7.9%	$18,062	17.0%	At-Risk
Cherokee	24,863	4.2%	$18,348	15.6%	Transitional
Chilton	41,953	3.5%	$20,677	15.7%	Transitional
Clay	13,829	5.3%	$18,756	17.1%	Transitional
Cleburne	14,700	3.6%	$20,854	13.9%	Transitional
Colbert	54,766	4.6%	$20,281	14.0%	Transitional
Coosa	11,044	5.8%	$16,394	14.9%	At-Risk
Cullman	80,187	3.4%	$21,038	13.0%	Transitional
DeKalb	69,014	4.2%	$19,191	15.4%	Transitional
Elmore	75,688	3.5%	$23,811	10.2%	Transitional
Etowah	103,362	4.3%	$21,004	15.7%	Transitional
Fayette	18,005	4.7%	$16,948	17.3%	Transitional
Franklin	30,847	4.9%	$18,647	18.9%	Transitional
Hale	18,236	5.3%	$15,762	26.9%	Distressed
Jackson	53,745	4.5%	$20,610	13.7%	Transitional
Jefferson	656,700	3.9%	$36,594	14.8%	Competitive
Lamar	14,548	5.7%	$16,420	16.1%	At-Risk
Lauderdale	87,891	4.2%	$22,186	14.4%	Transitional
Lawrence	34,312	4.5%	$21,003	15.3%	Transitional
Limestone	72,446	3.4%	$24,247	12.3%	Transitional
Macon	22,594	5.3%	$15,193	32.8%	Distressed
Madison	304,307	3.1%	$33,633	10.5%	Attainment
Marion	30,165	5.2%	$18,726	15.6%	Transitional
Marshall	87,185	3.4%	$22,546	14.7%	Transitional
Morgan	115,237	3.7%	$28,069	12.3%	Transitional
Pickens	20,133	5.1%	$18,275	24.9%	At-Risk
Randolph	22,673	5.2%	$16,850	17.0%	At-Risk
Shelby	178,182	2.7%	$40,595	6.3%	Attainment
St. Clair	75,232	3.5%	$24,383	12.1%	Transitional
Talladega	80,271	5.2%	$22,622	17.6%	Transitional
Tallapoosa	41,010	5.2%	$20,518	16.6%	Transitional
Tuscaloosa	171,159	3.3%	$28,044	17.0%	Transitional
Walker	70,034	4.3%	$21,039	16.5%	Transitional
Winston	24,634	5.6%	$17,041	17.1%	At-Risk

== Georgia ==
County	Population	Unemployment Rate	Market Income Per Capita	Poverty Rate	Status
Banks	14,422	3.6%	$24,326	12.5%	Transitional
Barrow	46,144	4.9%	$22,217	8.3%	Transitional
Bartow	76,019	5.7%	$23,853	8.6%	Transitional
Carroll	87,268	5.5%	$21,980	13.7%	Transitional
Catoosa	53,282	4.2%	$22,313	9.4%	Transitional
Chattooga	25,470	6.9%	$14,526	14.3%	At-Risk
Cherokee	141,903	4.2%	$31,735	5.3%	Attainment
Dade	15,154	4.7%	$20,621	9.7%	Transitional
Dawson	15,999	4.5%	$28,243	7.6%	Competitive
Douglas	92,174	5.4%	$24,243	7.8%	Transitional
Elbert	20,511	6.9%	$18,837	17.3%	At-Risk
Fannin	19,798	4.7%	$18,775	12.4%	Transitional
Floyd	90,565	5.2%	$22,926	14.4%	Transitional
Forsyth	98,407	3.8%	$36,334	5.5%	Attainment
Franklin	20,285	5.6%	$19,603	13.9%	Transitional
Gilmer	23,456	4.3%	$20,037	12.5.%	Transitional
Gordon	44,104	5.5%	$20,958	9.9%	Transitional
Gwinnett	757,104	4.6%	$30,541	5.7%	Attainment
Habersham	35,902	4.5%	$20,006	12.2%	Transitional
Hall	139,277	4.3%	$25,437	12.4%	Transitional
Haralson	25,690	5.3%	$20,539	15.5%	Transitional
Hart	22,997	7.2%	$17,604	14.8%	At-Risk
Heard	11,012	5.8%	$18,112	13.6%	Transitional
Jackson	41,589	4.8%	$23,306	12.0%	Transitional
Lumpkin	21,016	5.1%	$22,870	13.2%	Transitional
Madison	25,730	4.2%	$21,761	11.6%	Transitional
Murray	36,506	5.4%	$19,292	12.7%	Transitional
Paulding	81,678	4.7%	$26,634	5.5%	Competitive
Pickens	22,983	4.5%	$28,622	9.2%	Competitive
Polk	38,127	5.1%	$17,089	15.5%	Transitional
Rabun	15,050	5.9%	$21,780	11.1%	Transitional
Stephens	25,435	5.3%	$20,484	15.1%	Transitional
Towns	9,319	4.3%	$22,737	11.8%	Transitional
Union	17,289	4.4%	$20,794	12.5%	Transitional
Walker	61,053	5.1%	$19,439	12.5%	Transitional
White	19,944	4.2%	$19,762	10.5%	Transitional
Whitfield	83,525	5.5%	$26,359	11.5%	Transitional

== Kentucky ==
County	Population	Unemployment Rate	Market Income Per Capita	Poverty Rate	Status
Adair	17,244	6.2%	$14,883	24.0%	Distressed
Bath	11,085	8.2%	$15,055	21.9%	Distressed
Bell	30,060	8.4%	$12,161	31.1%	Distressed
Boyd	49,752	5.6%	$22,853	15.5%	Transitional
Breathitt	16,100	7.3%	$12,352	33.2%	Distressed
Carter	26,889	7.8%	$14,335	22.3%	Distressed
Casey	15,447	6.3%	$13,855	25.5%	Distressed
Clark	33,144	5.6%	$24,902	10.6%	Transitional
Clay	24,556	10.5%	$9,707	39.7%	Distressed
Clinton	9,634	6.0%	$13,747	25.8%	Distressed
Cumberland	7,147	7.5%	$11,281	23.8%	Distressed
Edmonson	12,085	7.0%	$16,301	18.4%	At-Risk
Elliott	6,748	8.2%	$9,977	25.9%	Distressed
Estill	15,307	7.1%	$12,647	26.4%	Distressed
Fleming	13,792	6.8%	$14,291	18.6%	Distressed
Floyd	42,441	6.7%	$14,809	30.3%	Distressed
Garrard	14,792	6.1%	$17,299	14.7%	At-Risk
Green	11,518	6.6%	$13,078	18.4%	Distressed
Greenup	36,891	6.0%	$21,230	14.1%	Transitional
Harlan	33,202	8.8%	$12,178	32.5%	Distressed
Hart	17,445	6.2%	$13,726	22.4%	Distressed
Jackson	13,495	11.8%	$9,090	30.2%	Distressed
Johnson	23,445	6.6%	$14,810	26.6%	Distressed
Knott	17,649	7.0%	$13,015	31.1%	Distressed
Knox	31,795	7.2%	$14,283	34.8%	Distressed
Laurel	52,715	6.0%	$17,343	21.3%	At-Risk
Lawrence	15,569	8.4%	$13,129	30.7%	Distressed
Lee	7,916	7.2%	$11,883	30.4%	Distressed
Leslie	12,401	8.8%	$11,428	32.7%	Distressed
Letcher	25,277	7.4%	$14,191	27.1%	Distressed
Lewis	14,092	8.5%	$10,770	28.5%	Distressed
Lincoln	23,361	7.2%	$15,014	21.1%	Distressed
Madison	70,872	5.1%	$19,835	16.8%	Transitional
Magoffin	13,332	10.7%	$11,415	36.6%	Distressed
Martin	12,578	7.8%	$12,930	37.0%	Distressed
McCreary	17,080	9.8%	$8,985	32.2%	Distressed
Menifee	6,556	9.1%	$10,459	29.6%	Distressed
Metcalfe	10,037	6.1%	$13,504	23.6%	Distressed
Monroe	11,756	7.2%	$13,023	23.4%	Distressed
Montgomery	22,554	6.5%	$19,075	15.2%	Transitional
Morgan	13,948	9.2%	$11,267	27.2%	Distressed
Nicholas	6,813	6.9%	$17,044	13.2%	At-Risk
Owsley	4,858	8.7%	$10,393	45.4%	Distressed
Perry	29,390	7.0%	$16,825	29.1%	Distressed
Pike	68,736	6.0%	$18,772	23.4%	At-Risk
Powell	13,237	7.6%	$14,404	23.5%	Distressed
Pulaski	56,217	6.5%	$17,883	19.1%	At-Risk
Robertson	2,266	5.9%	$13,959	22.2%	Distressed
Rockcastle	16,582	7.0%	$12,900	23.1%	Distressed
Rowan	22,094	5.8%	$16,183	21.3%	At-Risk
Russell	16,315	6.8%	$14,677	24.3%	Distressed
Wayne	19,923	7.3%	$13,111	29.4%	Distressed
Whitley	35,865	6.7%	$14,105	26.4%	Distressed
Wolfe	7,065	9.9%	$9,737	35.9%	Distressed

== Maryland ==
County	Population	Unemployment Rate	Market Income Per Capita	Poverty Rate	Status
Allegany	73,639	5.5%	$18,482	14.8%	Transitional
Garrett	29,846	4.7%	$22,776	13.3%	Transitional
Washington	143,748	4.8%	$27,738	9.5%	Transitional

== Mississippi ==
County	Population	Unemployment Rate	Market Income Per Capita	Poverty Rate	Status
Alcorn	34,558	7.5%	$17,453	16.6%	At-Risk
Benton	8,026	10.1%	$11,831	23.2%	Distressed
Calhoun	15,069	8.6%	$17,397	18.1%	At-Risk
Chickasaw	19,440	10.2%	$15,815	20.0%	Distressed
Choctaw	9,758	7.9%	$14,063	24.7%	Distressed
Clay	21,979	13.2%	$18,977	23.5%	Distressed
Itawamba	22,770	7.4%	$19,426	14.0%	At-Risk
Kemper	10,453	8.2%	$13,477	26.0%	Distressed
Lee	75,755	6.5%	$25,212	13.4%	Transitional
Lowndes	61,586	7.5%	$23,211	21.3%	At-Risk
Marshall	34,993	8.0%	$17,861	21.9%	Distressed
Monroe	38,014	9.5%	$18,602	17.2%	At-Risk
Montgomery	12,189	9.2%	$15,433	24.3%	Distressed
Noxubee	12,548	12.6%	$12,690	32.8%	Distressed
Oktibbeha	42,902	6.4%	$22,010	28.2%	At-Risk
Panola	34,274	8.2%	$16,610	25.3%	Distressed
Pontotoc	26,726	6.9%	$18,813	13.8%	Transitional
Prentiss	25,556	7.8%	$14,693	16.5%	At-Risk
Tippah	20,826	8.1%	$15,886	16.9%	At-Risk
Tishomingo	19,163	8.2%	$14,190	14.1%	At-Risk
Union	25,362	6.5%	$18,778	12.6%	Transitional
Webster	10,294	8.6%	$12,983	18.7%	Distressed
Winston	20,160	7.2%	$17,094	23.7%	Distressed
Yalobusha	13,051	8.2%	$15,125	21.8%	Distressed

== New York ==
County	Population	Unemployment Rate	Market Income Per Capita	Poverty Rate	Status
Allegany	49,927	5.8%	$16,850	15.5%	At Risk
Broome	200,536	5.0%	$24,199	12.8%	Transitional
Cattaraugus	83,955	5.5%	$21,285	13.7%	Transitional
Chautauqua	136,409	4.9%	$19,622	13.8%	Transitional
Chemung	91,070	5.1%	$22,513	13.0%	Transitional
Chenango	51,401	5.5%	$20,896	14.4%	Transitional
Cortland	48,599	5.7%	$21,134	15.5%	Transitional
Delaware	48,055	4.9%	$21,160	12.9%	Transitional
Otsego	61,676	4.9%	$21,819	14.9%	Transitional
Schoharie	31,582	6.0%	$23,145	11.4%	Transitional
Schuyler	19,224	5.4%	$21,042	11.8%	Transitional
Steuben	98,726	5.6%	$28,065	13.2%	Transitional
Tioga	51,784	4.8%	$24,885	8.4%	Transitional
Tompkins	96,501	3.7%	$26,007	17.6%	Transitional

== North Carolina ==
County	Population	Unemployment Rate	Market Income Per Capita	Poverty Rate	Status
Alexander	33,603	5.8%	$22,866	8.5%	Transitional
Alleghany	10,667	5.9%	$18,382	17.2%	At-Risk
Ashe	24,384	5.8%	$18,759	13.5%	Transitional
Avery	17,167	5.2%	$18,131	15.3%	Transitional
Buncombe	206,330	4.0%	$27,032	11.4%	Transitional
Burke	89,148	6.7%	$21,216	10.7%	Transitional
Caldwell	77,415	7.5%	$20,559	10.7%	Transitional
Cherokee	24,298	7.0%	$14,637	15.3%	At-Risk
Clay	8,775	4.8%	$16,941	11.4%	Transitional
Davie	34,835	5.1%	$28,942	8.6%	Competitive
Forsyth	306,067	4.9%	$31,922	11.0%	Competitive
Graham	7,993	8.2%	$17,362	19.5%	At-Risk
Haywood	54,033	4.6%	$21,709	11.5%	Transitional
Henderson	89,173	4.0%	$26,449	9.7%	Competitive
Jackson	33,121	4.2%	$22,083	15.1%	Transitional
Macon	29,811	4.8%	$20,931	12.6%	Transitional
Madison	19,635	4.6%	$18,114	15.4%	Transitional
McDowell	42,151	6.7%	$17,929	11.6%	Transitional
Mitchell	15,687	7.2%	$16,171	13.8%	At-Risk
Polk	18,324	4.0%	$31,391	10.1%	Competitive
Rutherford	62,889	7.5%	$19,511	13.9%	At-Risk
Stokes	44,711	4.9%	$21,442	9.1%	Transitional
Surry	71,219	6.2%	$21,621	12.4%	Transitional
Swain	12,968	6.6%	$16,981	18.3%	At-Risk
Transylvania	29,334	4.4%	$23,938	9.5%	Transitional
Watauga	42,695	3.9%	$25,899	17.9%	Transitional
Wilkes	65,632	6.2%	$23,730	11.9%	Transitional
Yadkin	36,348	4.8%	$21,503	10.0%	Transitional
Yancey	17,774	6.4%	$15,555	15.8%	At-Risk

== Ohio ==
County	Population	Unemployment Rate	Market Income Per Capita	Poverty Rate	Status
Adams	27,477	8.2%	$16,496	17.4%	At-Risk
Ashtabula	97,574	7.2%	$19,971	12.1%	Transitional
Athens	62,431	6.2%	$17,478	27.4%	Distressed
Belmont	66,497	5.8%	$19,613	14.6%	Transitional
Brown	43,676	6.9%	$21,053	11.6%	Transitional
Carroll	26,721	6.6%	$19,794	11.4%	Transitional
Clermont	208,601	5.3%	$30,139	7.1%	Competitive
Columbiana	101,877	6.6%	$19,460	11.5%	Transitional
Coshocton	36,612	7.4%	$20,338	9.1%	Transitional
Gallia	29,220	6.3%	$19,658	18.1%	At-Risk
Guernsey	38,438	7.1%	$17,783	16.0%	At-Risk
Harrison	14,483	6.4%	$17,481	13.3%	Transitional
Highland	43,317	6.3%	$20,528	11.8%	Transitional
Hocking	28,050	6.7%	$18,832	13.5%	Transitional
Holmes	44,223	4.2%	$20,215	12.9%	Transitional
Jackson	32,653	7.9%	$17,334	16.5%	At-Risk
Jefferson	65,249	6.8%	$19,858	15.1%	Transitional
Lawrence	58,240	5.3%	$17,249	18.9%	At-Risk
Mahoning	228,614	6.6%	$23,812	12.5%	Transitional
Meigs	22,210	9.1%	$15,102	19.8%	Distressed
Monroe	13,385	9.2%	$17,967	13.9%	At-Risk
Morgan	13,802	9.6%	$13,958	18.4%	Distressed
Muskingum	86,410	7.8%	$20,353	12.9%	Transitional
Noble	14,115	7.6%	$13,556	11.4%	At-Risk
Perry	35,408	7.7%	$16,446	11.8%	At-Risk
Pike	27,088	9.4%	$16,496	18.6%	Distressed
Ross	77,093	7.0%	$20,200	12.0%	Transitional
Scioto	74,008	7.7%	$17,028	19.3%	At-Risk
Trumbull	201,977	6.6%	$22,221	10.3%	Transitional
Tuscarawas	93,263	5.5%	$21,465	9.4%	Transitional
Vinton	12,800	8.3%	$14,116	20.0%	Distressed
Washington	59,711	5.3%	$22,660	11.4%	Transitional

== Pennsylvania ==
Although none of the counties in Pennsylvania have reached Attainment status, six of them have reached Competitive stats. Of the six, four of them (Allegheny, Butler, Washington and Westmoreland) are all part of the Pittsburgh metropolitan area, including the city of Pittsburgh. The area has been largely unaffected by the Great Recession and has seen economic growth due to recent activity in the Marcellus Formation.

County	Population	Unemployment Rate	Market Income Per Capita	Poverty Rate	Status
Allegheny	1,281,666	4.5%	$38,941	11.2%	Competitive
Armstrong	72,392	5.4%	$23,449	11.7%	Transitional
Beaver	181,412	4.9%	$24,802	9.4%	Transitional
Bedford	49,984	6.1%	$19,888	10.3%	Transitional
Blair	129,144	4.6%	$22,536	12.6%	Transitional
Bradford	62,761	4.9%	$20,846	11.8%	Transitional
Butler	174,083	4.3%	$31,614	9.1%	Competitive
Cambria	152,593	5.6%	$20,382	12.5%	Transitional
Cameron	5,974	7.1%	$20,763	9.4%	At-Risk
Carbon	58,802	6.0%	$22,652	9.5%	Transitional
Centre	135,758	3.8%	$27,167	18.8%	Transitional
Clarion	41,765	5.3%	$21,823	15.4%	Transitional
Clearfield	83,382	5.8%	$19,425	12.5%	Transitional
Clinton	37,914	5.7%	$20,410	14.2%	Transitional
Columbia	64,151	5.5%	$23,425	13.1%	Transitional
Crawford	90,366	5.3%	$$19,880	12.8%	Transitional
Elk	35,112	5.1%	$23,904	7.0%	Transitional
Erie	280,843	5.2%	$23,536	12.0%	Transitional
Fayette	148,644	6.2%	$18,834	18.0%	At-Risk
Forest	4,946	7.1%	$11,982	16.4	Distressed
Fulton	14,261	6.0%	$24,424	10.8%	Transitional
Greene	40,672	5.5%	$18,372	15.9%	Transitional
Huntingdon	45,586	5.7%	$18,905	11.3%	Transitional
Indiana	89,605	5.0%	$23,838	17.3%	Transitional
Jefferson	45,932	5.0%	$20,924	11.8%	Transitional
Juniata	22,821	4.6%	$22,939	9.5%	Transitional
Lackawanna	213,295	5.2%	$25,979	10.6%	Transitional
Lawrence	213,295	5.6%	$21,046	12.1%	Transitional
Luzerne	319,250	5.5%	$25,387	11.1%	Transitional
Lycoming	120,044	5.3%	$23,467	11.5%	Transitional
McKean	45,936	5.5%	$21,872	13.1%	Transitional
Mercer	120,293	6.0%	$21,615	11.5%	Transitional
Mifflin	46,486	5.6%	$19,262	12.5%	Transitional
Monroe	138,687	5.4%	$24,443	9.0%	Transitional
Montour	18,236	4.2%	$30,136	8.7%	Competitive
Northumberland	94,556	5.6%	$21,604	11.9%	Transitional
Perry	43,602	4.4%	$24,861	7.7%	Competitive
Pike	46,302	5.9%	$24,369	6.9%	Transitional
Potter	18,080	6.8%	$22,442	12.7%	Transitional
Schuylkill	150,336	5.6%	$20,922	9.5%	Transitional
Snyder	37,546	4.9%	$22,382	9.9%	Transitional
Somerset	80,023	5.8%	$19,564	11.8%	Transitional
Sullivan	6,556	5.2%	$18,285	14.5%	Transitional
Susquehanna	42,238	4.9%	$22,350	12.3%	Transitional
Tioga	41,373	5.7%	$17,936	13.5%	Transitional
Union	41,624	5.5%	$22,531	8.8%	Transitional
Venango	57,565	5.3%	$19,295	13.4%	Transitional
Warren	43,863	5.0%	$22,401	9.9%	Transitional
Washington	202,897	4.9%	$31,320	9.8%	Competitive
Wayne	47,722	4.5%	$21,725	11.3%	Transitional
Westmoreland	369,993	4.9%	$28,708	8.6%	Competitive
Wyoming	28,080	5.5%	$23,525	10.2%	Transitional

== South Carolina ==
County	Population	Unemployment Rate	Market Income Per Capita	Poverty Rate	Status
Anderson	203,718	6.4%	$23,200	12.0%	Transitional
Cherokee	56,216	7.9%	$18,593	13.9%	At-Risk
Greenville	525,534	5.2%	$29,859	10.5%	Transitional
Oconee	78,607	7.7%	$24,991	10.8%	Transitional
Pickens	131,404	5.7%	$21,287	13.7%	Transitional
Spartanburg	327,997	6.3%	$23,290	12.3%	Transitional

== Tennessee ==
County	Population	Unemployment Rate	Market Income Per Capita	Poverty Rate	Status
Anderson	71,330	4.9%	$24,362	13.1%	Transitional
Bledsoe	12,367	6.9%	$17,822	18.1%	At-Risk
Blount	105,823	4.8%	$23,668	9.7%	Transitional
Bradley	87,965	5.3%	$23,302	12.2%	Transitional
Campbell	39,854	6.4%	$16,281	22.8%	At-Risk
Cannon	12,826	5.8%	$20,820	12.8%	Transitional
Carter	56,742	5.5%	$17,213	16.9%	At-Risk
Claiborne	29,862	6.1%	$16,412	22.6%	At-Risk
Clay	7,976	9.9%	$14,569	19.1%	Distressed
Cocke	33,565	7.4%	$13,966	22.5%	Distressed
Coffee	48,014	5.4%	$22,855	14.3%	Transitional
Cumberland	46,802	6.5%	$19,101	14.7%	Transitional
DeKalb	17,423	5.5%	$19,913	17.0%	Transitional
Fentress	16,625	7.5%	$15,796	23.1%	Distressed
Franklin	39,270	5.7%	$19,803	13.2%	Transitional
Grainger	20,659	6.4%	$16,834	18.7%	At-Risk
Greene	62,909	8.0%	$20,980	14.5%	At-Risk
Grundy	14,332	7.4%	$14,565	25.8%	Distressed
Hamblen	58,128	5.9%	$20,876	14.4%	Transitional
Hamilton	307,896	4.7%	$30,637	12.1%	Transitional
Hancock	6,780	7.0%	$8,483	29.4%	Distressed
Hawkins	53,563	5.7%	$18,278	15.8%	Transitional
Jackson	10,984	7.5%	$16,768	18.1%	At-Risk
Jefferson	44,294	6.0%	$18,122	13.4%	Transitional
Johnson	17,499	6.9%	$13,306	22.6%	Distressed
Knox	382,032	4.1%	$30,203	12.6%	Transitional
Lawrence	39,926	9.7%	$15,553	14.6%	Distressed
Lewis	11,367	8.2%	$14,491	13.4%	At-Risk
Loudon	39,086	4.7%	$26,158	10.0%	Transitional
Macon	20,386	7.1%	$18,404	15.1%	At-Risk
Marion	27,776	6.4%	$21,265	14.1%	Transitional
McMinn	49,015	6.6%	$19,380	14.5%	Transitional
Meigs	11,086	7.3%	$17,364	18.3%	At-Risk
Monroe	38,961	7.1%	$18,065	15.5%	At-Risk
Morgan	19,757	6.7%	$15,247	16.0%	At-Risk
Overton	20,118	7.7%	$15,544	16.0%	At-Risk
Pickett	4,945	9.2%	$13,450	15.6%	Distressed
Polk	16,050	6.2%	$18,407	13.0%	Transitional
Putnam	62,315	5.6%	$21,302	16.4%	Transitional
Rhea	28,400	6.7%	$17,184	14.7%	At-Risk
Roane	51,910	5.2%	$22,544	13.9%	Transitional
Scott	21,127	8.4%	$13,259	20.2%	Distressed
Sequatchie	11,370	5.7%	$20,216	16.5%	Transitional
Sevier	71,170	5.8%	$24,619	10.7%	Transitional
Smith	17,712	6.4%	$21,478	12.2%	Transitional
Sullivan	153,048	4.6%	$24,950	12.9%	Transitional
Unicoi	17,667	6.3%	$19,159	13.1%	Transitional
Union	17,808	5.2%	$16,120	19.6%	At-Risk
Van Buren	5,508	7.4%	$17,427	15.2%	At-Risk
Warren	38,276	7.9%	$18,252	16.6%	At-Risk
Washington	107,198	4.7%	$24,163	13.9%	Transitional
White	23,102	7.9%	$14,964	14.3%	At-Risk

== Virginia ==
In Virginia, all municipalities incorporated as "cities" are legally separate from the counties in which they are located. As of the 2000 Census, nine cities were part of the federally designated Appalachia region. This number was reduced to eight in 2001, when Clifton Forge relinquished its city charter and reincorporated as a town within Alleghany County.

County	Population	Unemployment Rate	Market Income Per Capita	Poverty Rate	Status
Alleghany (includes Covington)	23,518	5.3%	$19,773	10.9%	Transitional
Bath	5,048	3.4%	$27,394	7.8%	Competitive
Bland	6,871	4.1%	$18,181	12.4%	Transitional
Botetourt	30,496	2.8%	$32,851	5.2%	Attainment
Buchanan	26,978	4.9%	$16,141	23.2%	At-Risk
Carroll (includes Galax)	36,082	5.8%	$17,632	13.6%	Transitional
Craig	5,091	3.7%	$22,296	10.3%	Transitional
Dickenson	16,395	5.3%	$13,488	21.3%	Distressed
Floyd	13,874	3.7%	$19,624	11.7%	Transitional
Giles	16,657	4.5%	$18,676	9.5%	Transitional
Grayson	17,917	5.7%	$15,731	13.6%	At-Risk
Henry (includes Martinsville)	73,346	6.7%	$19,704	13.2%	Transitional
Highland	2,536	3.9%	$21,944	12.6%	Transitional
Lee	23,589	4.5%	$15,453	23.9%	At-Risk
Montgomery (includes Radford)	99,488	3.6%	$21,518	24.5%	Transitional
Patrick	19,407	5.0%	$15,586	13.4%	Transitional
Pulaski	35,127	5.3%	$22,219	13.1%	Transitional
Rockbridge (includes Buena Vista and Lexington)	34,024	3.7%	$23,660	11.5%	Transitional
Russell	30,308	5.6%	$14,880	16.3%	At-Risk
Scott	23,403	5.0%	$16,840	16.8%	At-Risk
Smyth	33,081	5.4%	$18,124	13.3%	Transitional
Tazewell	44,598	4.3%	$20,178	15.3%	Transitional
Washington (includes Bristol)	68,470	4.7%	$22,965	12.3%	Transitional
Wise (includes Norton)	44,027	4.3%	$17,565	20.2%	At-Risk
Wythe	27,599	4.6%	$19,547	11.0%	Transitional

== West Virginia ==
County	Population	Unemployment Rate	Market Income Per Capita	Poverty Rate	Status
Barbour	15,557	5.1%	$15,596	22.6%	Distressed
Berkeley	75,905	4.2%	$24,517	11.5%	Transitional
Boone	25,535	4.2%	$16,406	22.0%	At-Risk
Braxton	14,702	5.1%	$14,237	22.0%	At-Risk
Brooke	25,447	6.0%	$20,611	11.7%	Transitional
Cabell	96,784	4.0%	$22,692	19.2%	Transitional
Calhoun	7,582	6.7%	$12,250	25.1%	Distressed
Clay	10,330	6.4%	$12,221	27.5%	Distressed
Doddridge	7,403	4.8%	$16,250	19.8%	At-Risk
Fayette	47,579	5.0%	$15,463	21.7%	At-Risk
Gilmer	7,160	4.0%	$16,822	25.9%	At-Risk
Grant	11,299	5.2%	$19,850	16.3%	Transitional
Greenbrier	34,453	5.6%	$20,060	18.2%	Transitional
Hampshire	20,203	3.8%	$17,146	16.3%	Transitional
Hancock	32,667	6.1%	$20,434	11.1%	Transitional
Hardy	12,669	4.0%	$19,041	13.1%	Transitional
Harrison	68,652	4.1%	$25,006	17.2%	Transitional
Jackson	28,000	4.8%	$18,265	15.2%	Transitional
Jefferson	42,190	3.3%	$31,215	10.3%	Competitive
Kanawha	200,073	3.8%	$30,926	14.4%	Transitional
Lewis	16,919	4.6%	$19,631	19.9%	Transitional
Lincoln	22,108	5.2%	$14,423	27.9%	Distressed
Logan	37,710	4.5%	$16,900	24.1%	At-Risk
Marion	56,598	3.9%	$22,515	16.3%	Transitional
Marshall	35,519	5.1%	$21,293	16.6%	Transitional
Mason	25,957	6.7%	$16,435	19.9%	At-Risk
McDowell	27,329	6.7%	$10,199	37.7%	Distressed
Mercer	62,980	4.2%	$18,191	19.7%	Transitional
Mineral	27,078	4.6%	$19,279	14.7%	Transitional
Mingo	28,253	4.9%	$15,964	29.7%	Distressed
Monongalia	81,866	3.0%	$27,791	22.8%	Transitional
Monroe	14,583	4.6%	$15,380	16.2%	At-Risk
Morgan	14,943	4.7%	$26,818	10.4%	Transitional
Nicholas	26,562	4.7%	$17,905	19.2%	At-Risk
Ohio	47,427	4.2%	$27,798	15.8%	Transitional
Pendleton	8,196	3.9%	$20,271	11.4%	Transitional
Pleasants	7,514	5.5%	$20,858	13.7%	Transitional
Pocahontas	9,131	7.1%	$16,708	17.1%	At-Risk
Preston	29,334	4.0%	$18,942	18.3%	Transitional
Putnam	51,589	3.5%	$28,040	9.3%	Competitive
Raleigh	79,220	4.1%	$21,313	18.5%	Transitional
Randolph	28,262	5.0%	$19,628	18.0%	Transitional
Ritchie	10,343	5.0%	$18,308	19.1%	At-Risk
Roane	15,446	6.1%	$14,434	22.6%	Distressed
Summers	12,999	5.5%	$11,980	24.4%	Distressed
Taylor	16,089	4.6%	$16,815	20.3%	At-Risk
Tucker	7,321	5.9%	$17,487	18.1%	At-Risk
Tyler	9,592	6.2%	$15,851	16.6%	At-Risk
Upshur	23,404	4.2%	$17,987	20.0%	At-Risk
Wayne	42,903	4.7%	$18,768	19.6%	Transitional
Webster	9,719	5.4%	$12,789	31.8%	Distressed
Wetzel	17,693	7.1%	$18,909	19.8%	At-Risk
Wirt	5,873	5.7%	$12,895	19.6%	Distressed
Wood	87,986	4.6%	$22,189	13.9%	Transitional
Wyoming	25,708	5.2%	$15,336	25.1%	Distressed
