= Denali Commission =

US federal agency operating in Alaska

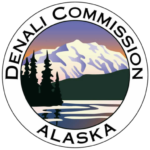

Agency overview
- Formed: 1998
- Jurisdiction: United States (Alaska)
- Headquarters: Anchorage, Alaska
- Agency executive: Incumbent: Julie E. Kitka, Federal Co-Chair
- Website: www.denali.gov

The Denali Commission is a federal agency in the US based in Anchorage, Alaska that provides utilities, infrastructure, and economic support throughout Alaska.

== History ==
The Denali Commission was established in 1998 by the Denali Commission Act of 1998 which was part of an omnibus appropriations bill. Since 2015, it has been assisting Alaskan communities threatened by rising sea levels caused by climate change.

As of 2019, it had a budget of over $46 million.

== Governance ==
Modeled on the Appalachian Regional Commission, the Denali Commission is led by a federal Co-Chair. Unlike similar commissions, the federal Co-Chair is appointed by the Secretary of Commerce rather than by the President with the advice and consent of the Senate. As a single state commission, its state co-chair is the Governor of Alaska. The remaining membership consists of the University of Alaska president; the Alaska Municipal League president; the Alaska Federation of Natives president; the Alaska State AFL-CIO president; and the Associated General Contractors of Alaska president.

== See also ==
- Appalachian Regional Commission, a similar federal-state partnership in Appalachia
- Delta Regional Authority, a similar federal-state partnership in the Mississippi Delta region
- List of micro-regional organizations
- Northern Border Regional Commission, a similar federal-state partnership consisting of areas of Maine, New Hampshire, New York, and Vermont along the Canada–United States border.
- Southeast Crescent Regional Commission
- Tennessee Valley Authority
