= Northern Border Regional Commission =

US economic commission

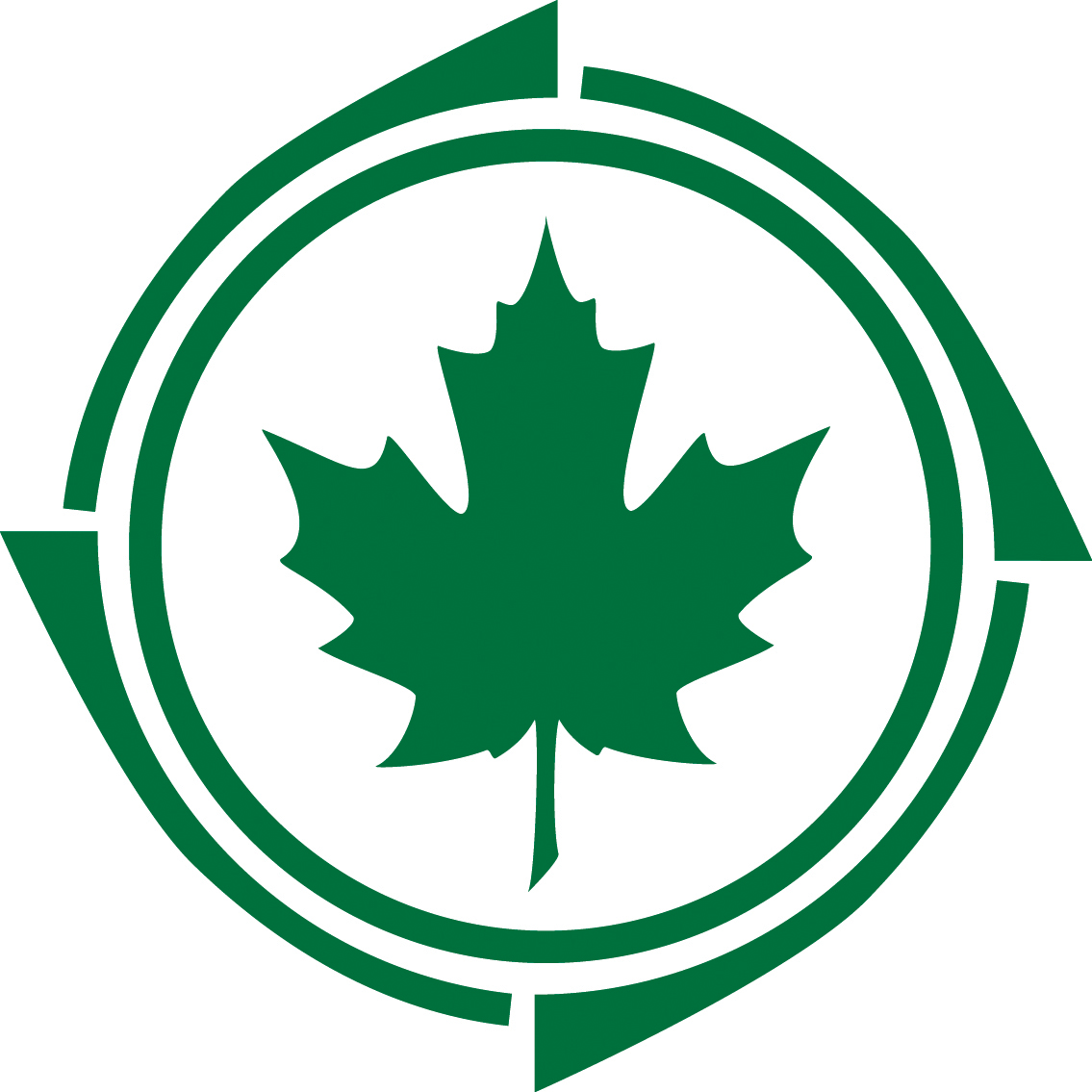
- The seal of the Northern Border Regional Commission

Agency overview
- Formed: 2008
- Jurisdiction: Federal government of the United States
- Headquarters: Concord, New Hampshire
- Agency executive: Chris Saunders, Federal Co-Chair
- Website: www.nbrc.gov

The Northern Border Regional Commission is an American federal-state partnership for community and economic development in counties near the Canada–United States border.

== History ==
The Northern Border Regional Commission (NBRC) was created as part of the Food, Conservation, and Energy Act of 2008. As of 2021, the NBRC has been reauthorized twice.

== Governance ==
Modeled off the Appalachian Regional Commission, the NBRC is led by a federal co-chair and the respective state governors. The federal co-chair nominated by the president of the United States and confirmed by the United States Senate. One of the governors is designated a state co-chair.

=== Federal co-chair ===
Chris Saunders was confirmed by the Senate on March 24, 2022, and began service on April 11, 2022.

List of federal co-chairs:

- Sanford "Sandy" Blitz of Maine (2010-2014)
- Mark Scarano of New Hampshire (2015-2018)
- Harold B. Parker of New Hampshire (2018-2022)
- Chris Saunders of Vermont (2022-present)

== Service area ==
The service area consists of upstate New York, most of Maine and New Hampshire, and all of Vermont.

== See also ==
- Appalachian Regional Commission
- Delta Regional Authority
- Denali Commission
- List of local government organizations
- Southeast Crescent Regional Commission
- Tennessee Valley Authority
