= Delta Regional Authority =

U.S. Federal–State partnership

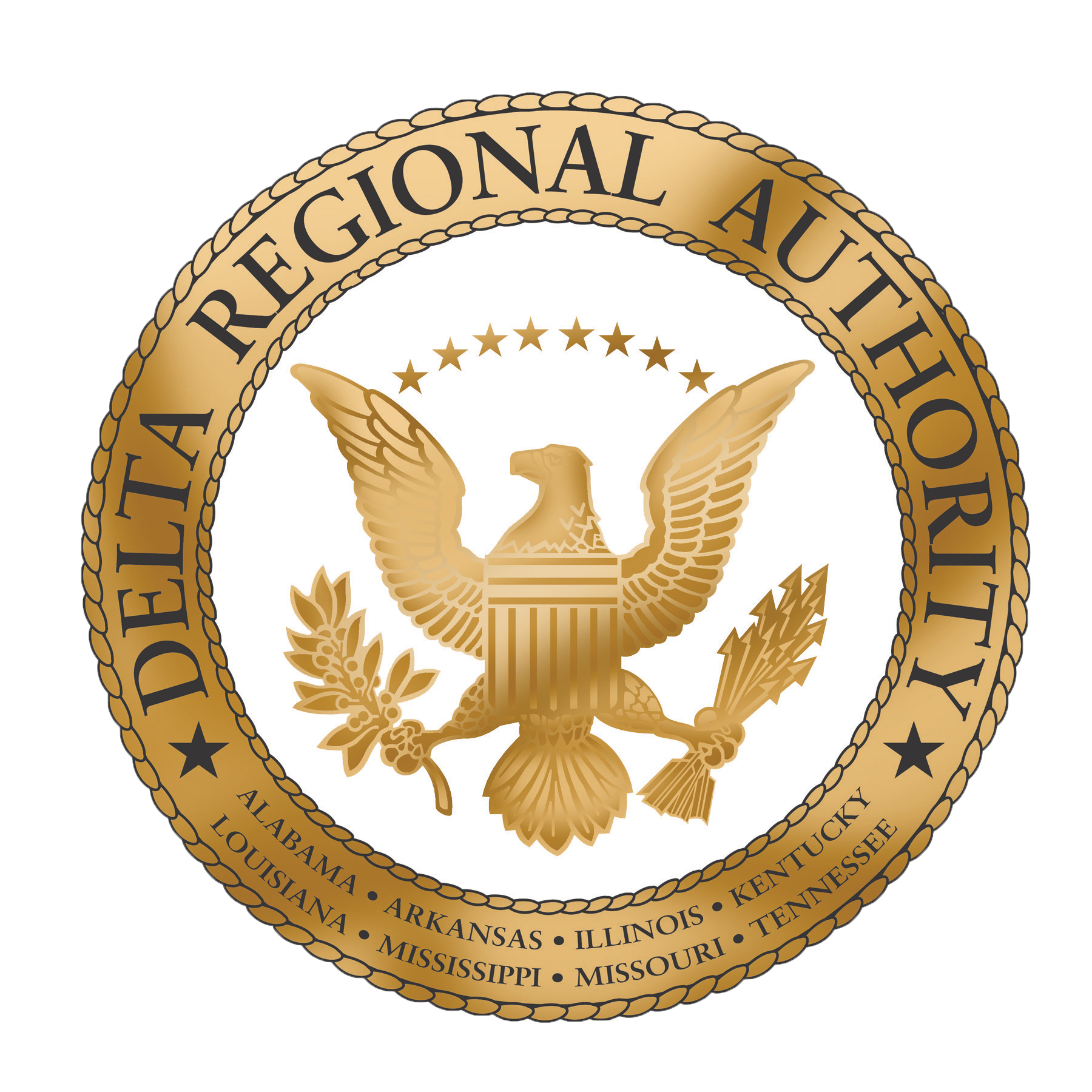
- The seal of the Delta Regional Authority

Agency overview
- Formed: 2000
- Headquarters: Clarksdale, Mississippi
- Annual budget: $30 million (2017)
- Agency executives: Corey Wiggins, Federal Co-Chair; Gov. Tate Reeves, States' Co-Chair
- Website: dra.gov

The Delta Regional Authority (DRA) is a federal-state partnership whose mission is to improve the quality of life for the residents of the Mississippi Delta. The Delta Regional Authority serves 255 counties and parishes in parts of eight states: Alabama, Arkansas, Illinois, Kentucky, Louisiana, Mississippi, Missouri, and Tennessee.

The DRA is led by a Federal Co-chairman appointed by the President and the governors of its eight member states. It builds partnerships across the region to promote economic development in the Delta. DRA funds may be used to supplement other federal and state programs.

Under federal law, at least 75 percent of DRA funds must be invested in economically distressed counties and parishes. Half of DRA funds are awarded for transportation and basic infrastructure improvements.

== About ==
The 1990 report of the Lower Mississippi Delta Development Commission spurred efforts to direct federal economic assistance toward the Lower Mississippi River Valley region. The region, as defined in the Lower Mississippi Delta Development Act of 1988, consisted of 219 counties in Arkansas, Tennessee, Louisiana, Mississippi, Kentucky, Missouri, and Illinois and was the poorest in the United States, with a poverty rate of 22% compared to a national rate of 12%. In 1998, President Bill Clinton, an Arkansas native, proposed channeling $26 million in federal aid to the region through the Appalachian Regional Commission, but Mississippi Governor Kirk Fordice opposed the plan, fearing it would divert aid from the Appalachian Region, including several counties in northern Mississippi. Instead, Congress funneled the allocation through the Department of Agriculture, but the department said it was unable to comply with Congress' intent without more specific direction.

In 1999, Arkansas Democrats Senator Blanche Lincoln and Representative Marion Berry introduced the Delta Regional Authority Act of 1999 to create the Delta Regional Authority to administer funds allocated to the region. The legislation was co-sponsored by Arkansas Republican Senator Tim Hutchinson, Tennessee Republican Senator Bill Frist, and Tennessee Democratic Representative Harold Ford Jr. Clinton announced in December 1999 that he would include $30 million in funding for the Authority in his next budget proposal. Mississippi Republican Senator Thad Cochran become the leading voice against the legislation, opining that the money should be channeled to the Delta Region through existing agencies such as colleges and universities.

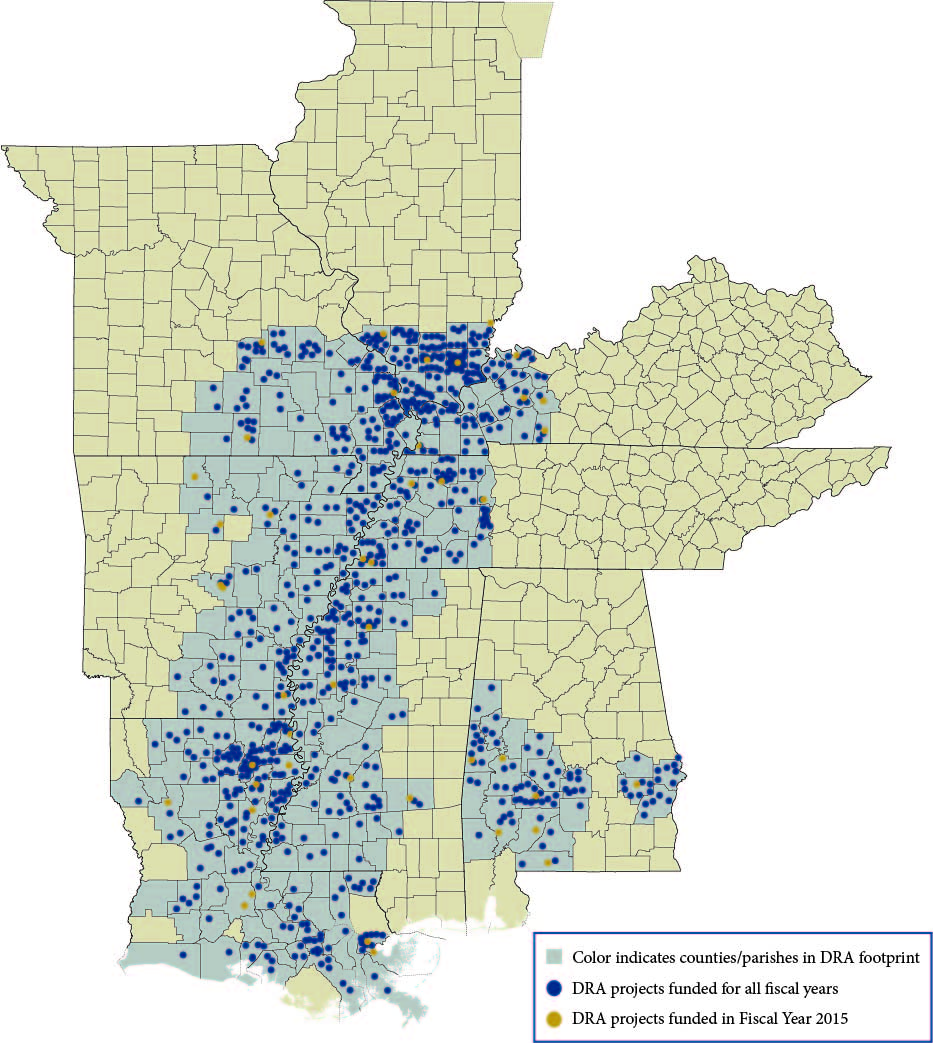
The DRA footprint includes 252 counties and parishes across 8 states. Since 2002, DRA has invested in 934 projects, represented by the blue and yellow dots; yellow indicates FY 2015 projects. Source: dra.gov/sedap

In 2000, Congress established the Delta Regional Authority to enhance economic development and improve the quality of life for the residents of the Lower Mississippi River Delta region.

The Delta Regional Authority is a regional economic development agency serving 252 counties and parishes in the following eight states:

- Alabama
- Arkansas
- Illinois
- Kentucky
- Louisiana
- Mississippi
- Missouri
- Tennessee

Two presidential appointees lead the DRA, the Federal Co-chairman (FCC) and the Alternate Federal Co-chairman (AFCC), along with a State Co-chairman and the governor of each participating state. It is designed to remedy severe and chronic economic distress by stimulating economic development and fostering partnerships that will have a positive impact on the region's economy.

== Mission ==
The Delta Regional Authority helps economically distressed communities to leverage other federal and state programs in the four Congressionally mandated priority funding categories:

- Basic public infrastructure in distressed counties and isolated areas of distress;
- Transportation infrastructure for the purpose of facilitating economic development in the region;
- Business development, with emphasis on entrepreneurship; and
- Workforce development or employment-related education, with emphasis on the use of existing public educational institutions located in the region.

== Outcomes ==
Since the start of the DRA Federal Funding Program, renamed the States' Economic Development Assistance Program in 2010, the agency has reported the following outcomes:

- Creation or retention of 26,000 jobs
- Improved water and sewer services for nearly 65,000 families
- Job training for 7,200 individuals

== Partnerships ==
At the local level, the Delta Regional Authority coordinates efforts with various agencies. Assisting the Delta Regional Authority are local development districts ("LDDs"), regional entities with a proven track record of helping municipalities, counties, and parishes improve basic infrastructure and stimulate growth.

DRA partners with USDA's Rural Development (RDA) Program. Through its network of state and local offices, the RDA assists the Delta Regional Authority with the Rural Community Advancement Program (RCAP). DRA also partnered with the Economic Development Association (EDA) by conducting community evaluations related to the 2010 Deepwater Horizon oil spill. Additionally, the Delta Regional Authority works with each member state's Department of Economic Development, local development districts, Departments of Transportation, governor's offices, Department of Health, Department of Defense, Department of Commerce, congressional offices, and city and county governments.

== Programs and initiatives ==
The Delta Regional Authority is involved in numerous efforts to improve the lives of the people it serves. The following programs are currently under operation throughout the Authority's region:

- DRA Growing a Health Workforce in the Delta Initiative (HDI);
- Delta Doctors Program (DDP);
- BF Smith Foundation – Adult Literacy/Workforce Training (BFS);
- Information Technology/iDelta (IT);
- Delta Development Highway System (DDHS);
- Multi-Modal Transportation (MMT);
- Delta Green Jobs Initiative (DGJI);
- Innovative Readiness Training Program (IRT);
- Local Development District (LDD);
- Entrepreneurship Training (SIU);
- Delta Leadership Institute (DLI).

== Service area ==
Alabama

Barbour County, Alabama; Bullock County, Alabama; Butler County, Alabama; Choctaw County, Alabama; Clarke County, Alabama; Conecuh County, Alabama; Dallas County, Alabama; Escambia County, Alabama; Greene County, Alabama; Hale County, Alabama; Lowndes County, Alabama; Macon County, Alabama; Marengo County, Alabama; Monroe County, Alabama; Perry County, Alabama; Pickens County, Alabama; Russell County, Alabama; Sumter County, Alabama; Washington County, Alabama; Wilcox County, Alabama

Arkansas

Arkansas County, Arkansas; Ashley County, Arkansas; Baxter County, Arkansas; Bradley County, Arkansas; Calhoun County, Arkansas; Chicot County, Arkansas; Clay County, Arkansas; Cleveland County, Arkansas; Craighead County, Arkansas; Crittenden County, Arkansas; Cross County, Arkansas; Dallas County, Arkansas; Desha County, Arkansas; Drew County, Arkansas; Fulton County, Arkansas; Grant County, Arkansas; Greene County, Arkansas; Independence County, Arkansas; Izard County, Arkansas; Jackson County, Arkansas; Jefferson County, Arkansas; Lawrence County, Arkansas; Lee County, Arkansas; Lincoln County, Arkansas; Lonoke County, Arkansas; Marion County, Arkansas; Mississippi County, Arkansas; Monroe County, Arkansas; Ouachita County, Arkansas; Phillips County, Arkansas; Poinsett County, Arkansas; Prairie County, Arkansas; Pulaski County, Arkansas; Randolph County, Arkansas; Searcy County, Arkansas; Sharp County, Arkansas; Stone County, Arkansas; St. Francis County, Arkansas; Union County, Arkansas; Van Buren County, Arkansas; White County, Arkansas; Woodruff County, Arkansas

Illinois

Alexander County, Illinois; Franklin County, Illinois; Gallatin County, Illinois; Hamilton County, Illinois; Hardin County, Illinois; Jackson County, Illinois; Johnson County, Illinois; Massac County, Illinois; Perry County, Illinois; Pope County, Illinois; Pulaski County, Illinois; Randolph County, Illinois; Saline County, Illinois; Union County, Illinois; White County, Illinois; Williamson County, Illinois

Kentucky

Ballard County, Kentucky; Caldwell County, Kentucky; Christian County, Kentucky; Calloway County, Kentucky; Carlisle County, Kentucky; Crittenden County, Kentucky; Fulton County, Kentucky; Graves County, Kentucky; Henderson County, Kentucky; Hickman County, Kentucky; Hopkins County, Kentucky; Livingston County, Kentucky; Lyon County, Kentucky; Marshall County, Kentucky; McCracken County, Kentucky; McLean County, Kentucky; Muhlenberg County, Kentucky; Todd County, Kentucky; Trigg County, Kentucky; Union County, Kentucky; Webster County, Kentucky

Louisiana

Acadia Parish, Louisiana; Allen Parish, Louisiana; Ascension Parish, Louisiana; Assumption Parish, Louisiana; Avoyelles Parish, Louisiana; Beauregard Parish, Louisiana; Bienville Parish, Louisiana; Caldwell Parish, Louisiana; Cameron Parish, Louisiana; Claiborne Parish, Louisiana; Concordia Parish, Louisiana; Catahoula Parish, Louisiana; DeSoto Parish, Louisiana; East Carroll Parish, Louisiana; East Baton Rouge Parish, Louisiana; Evangeline Parish, Louisiana; Franklin Parish, Louisiana; Iberia Parish, Louisiana; Iberville Parish, Louisiana; East Feliciana Parish, Louisiana; Grant Parish, Louisiana; Lafourche Parish, Louisiana; Jackson Parish, Louisiana; Jefferson Davis Parish, Louisiana; Livingston Parish, Louisiana; Jefferson Parish, Louisiana; Lincoln Parish, Louisiana; Natchitoches Parish, Louisiana; La Salle Parish, Louisiana; Morehouse Parish, Louisiana; Plaquemines Parish, Louisiana; Madison Parish, Louisiana; Ouachita Parish, Louisiana; Richland Parish, Louisiana; Orleans Parish, Louisiana; Rapides Parish, Louisiana; St. Helena Parish, Louisiana; Pointe Coupee Parish, Louisiana; Red River Parish, Louisiana;St. Landry Parish, Louisiana; St. Bernard Parish, Louisiana; St. Charles Parish, Louisiana; St. Mary Parish, Louisiana; St. James Parish, Louisiana; St. John the Baptist Parish, Louisiana; St. Martin Parish, Louisiana; Tangipahoa Parish, Louisiana; Tensas Parish, Louisiana; Union Parish, Louisiana; Vermillion Parish, Louisiana; Washington Parish, Louisiana; Webster Parish, Louisiana; West Baton Rouge Parish, Louisiana; West Carroll Parish, Louisiana; West Feliciana Parish, Louisiana; Winn Parish, Louisiana

Mississippi

Adams County, Mississippi; Amite County, Mississippi; Attala County, Mississippi; Benton County, Mississippi; Bolivar County, Mississippi; Carroll County, Mississippi; Claiborne County, Mississippi; Coahoma County, Mississippi; Copiah County, Mississippi; Covington County, Mississippi; DeSoto County, Mississippi; Franklin County, Mississippi; Grenada County, Mississippi; Hinds County, Mississippi; Holmes County, Mississippi; Humphreys County, Mississippi; Issaquena County, Mississippi; Jasper County, Mississippi; Jefferson County, Mississippi; Jefferson Davis County, Mississippi; Lawrence County, Mississippi; Leflore County, Mississippi; Lafayette County, Mississippi; Madison County, Mississippi; Marion County, Mississippi; Lincoln County, Mississippi; Montgomery County, Mississippi; Panola County, Mississippi; Marshall County, Mississippi; Quitman County, Mississippi; Rankin County, Mississippi; Pike County, Mississippi; Smith County, Mississippi; Sunflower County, Mississippi; Sharkey County, Mississippi; Simpson County, Mississippi; Tippah County, Mississippi; Tallahatchie County, Mississippi; Tate County, Mississippi; Tunica County, Mississippi; Union County, Mississippi; Walthall County, Mississippi; Warren County, Mississippi; Washington County, Mississippi; Wilkinson County, Mississippi; Yalobusha County, Mississippi; Yazoo County, Mississippi

Missouri

Bollinger County, Missouri; Butler County, Missouri; Cape Girardeau County, Missouri; Carter County, Missouri; Crawford County, Missouri; Dent County, Missouri; Douglas County, Missouri; Dunklin County, Missouri; Howell County, Missouri; Iron County, Missouri; Madison County, Missouri; Mississippi County, Missouri; New Madrid County, Missouri; Ozark County, Missouri; Pemiscot County, Missouri; Oregon County, Missouri; Phelps County, Missouri; Perry County, Missouri; Reynolds County, Missouri; Ripley County, Missouri; Scott County, Missouri; Shannon County, Missouri; Ste. Genevieve County, Missouri; St. Francois County, Missouri; Stoddard County, Missouri; Texas County, Missouri; Washington County, Missouri; Wayne County, Missouri; Wright County, Missouri

Tennessee

Benton County, Tennessee; Carroll County, Tennessee; Chester County, Tennessee; Crockett County, Tennessee; Decatur County, Tennessee; Dyer County, Tennessee; Fayette County, Tennessee; Gibson County, Tennessee; Hardeman County, Tennessee; Hardin County, Tennessee; Haywood County, Tennessee; Henderson County, Tennessee; Henry County, Tennessee; Lake County, Tennessee; Lauderdale County, Tennessee; Madison County, Tennessee; McNairy County, Tennessee; Obion County, Tennessee; Shelby County, Tennessee; Tipton County, Tennessee; Weakley County, Tennessee

== See also ==
- Denali Commission
- List of micro-regional organizations
- Northern Border Regional Commission
- Southeast Crescent Regional Commission
- Tennessee Valley Authority
