= Night Comes to the Cumberlands =

Non-fiction book by Harry Caudill

- First edition
- Author: Harry M. Caudill
- Publisher: Little, Brown
- Publication date: 1963

Night Comes to the Cumberlands: A Biography of a Depressed Area is a 1963 book by American historian Harry M. Caudill, which brought national attention to poverty in Appalachia and is credited with making the region a focus of the United States government's War on Poverty. In Poverty in the United States: An Encyclopedia of History, Politics, and Policy (2004), the book is described as a "definitive text on poverty in Appalachia among journalists, academics, and government bureaucrats concerned with economic inequality in America."
