= Harry M. Caudill =

American politician (1922–1990)

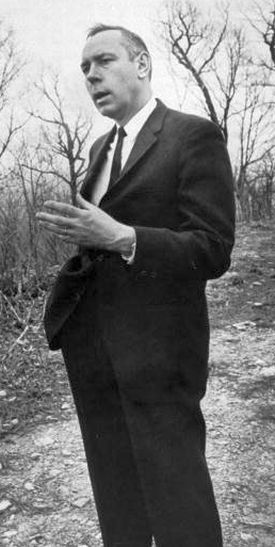
- Caudill in 1967
- Born: Harry Monroe Caudill; May 3, 1922; Whitesburg, Kentucky, U.S.
- Died: November 29, 1990 (aged 68); Whitesburg, Kentucky, U.S.
- Occupations: Author, historian, lawyer, legislator, and environmentalist
- Spouse(s): Anne Robertson (Frye) Caudill (m. 19??; his death 1990)
- Writing career
- Notable work: Night Comes to the Cumberlands

Member of the Kentucky House of Representatives from the 92nd district
- In office January 1, 1960 – January 1, 1962
- Preceded by: Hillard Kincer
- Succeeded by: William R. Jordan
- In office January 1, 1954 – January 1, 1958
- Preceded by: Bill Adams
- Succeeded by: Hillard Kincer

Harry Monroe Caudill (May 3, 1922 – November 29, 1990) was an American author, historian, lawyer, legislator, and environmentalist from Whitesburg, Kentucky, in the Central Appalachian coalfield.

== Biography ==
Caudill served in World War II as a private in the U.S. Army and was a 1948 graduate of the University of Kentucky law school. He was elected as a Democrat to the Kentucky House of Representatives in 1953, 1955, and 1959 to represent Letcher County. He taught in the History Department at the university from 1976 to 1984, and was named to UK's Hall of Distinguished Alumni in 1980.

A common theme explored in many of Caudill's writings is the historic underdevelopment of Appalachia, particularly his home area of southeastern Kentucky. In several of his books (most prominently Night Comes to the Cumberlands, 1962) and many of his published articles, he probes the historical poverty of the region, which he attributes in large part to the rapacious policies of the coal mining industries in the region, as well as their backers: politicians of Kentucky and bankers of the northeastern United States. He notes that the owners and financiers of the industry had their headquarters not in Appalachia but in the Northeast or Midwest, and argued that they failed to properly reinvest their sizable profits in the Appalachian region. Following publication of Night Comes to the Cumberlands, President John F. Kennedy appointed a commission to investigate conditions in the region and subsequently the federal government invested more than $15 billion in the region over the first 25 years of the Appalachian Regional Commission.

Caudill became an active opponent of the rapidly growing practice of strip mining in Appalachia, which he believed was causing irreparable harm to the land and its people. He published articles in many magazines in addition to speaking out about the subject. Caudill pointed out that strip mining could be done responsibly as in England, Germany, and Czechoslovakia where topsoil, subsoil, and rocks are removed separately and placed back in layers in their original order. His efforts contributed to passage of the first federal strip-mine law in 1977.

He became interested in the work of William Shockley, a Stanford University scientist with controversial eugenicist stances. Caudill came to believe in Shockley's theory of "dysgenics," the argument that unintelligent people weaken the genes of a "race" over time. He felt that "genetic decline" in Eastern Kentucky contributed to issues of poverty. "The slobs continue to multiply," Caudill wrote in a 1975 letter to Time magazine. The editors of Time rejected Caudill's letter.

Caudill also produced several volumes of folklore and oral history, which he collected himself from residents of southeastern Kentucky. One of those oral history interviews in 1941 of a man who would have been about 90 years old, was the basis for the 1995 movie, Pharaoh's Army, starring Chris Cooper, Patricia Clarkson, and Kris Kristofferson.

Faced with an advancing case of Parkinson's disease in 1990, Caudill killed himself with a gunshot to the head in the yard of his home, facing the mountains he wrote about. He is buried in Battle Grove Cemetery, Cynthiana, Kentucky.

== Legacy ==
The Harry M. Caudill Library located in Whitesburg, Kentucky, the main library of the Letcher County Public Library District, is named for Caudill.

== Quote ==
"And we just can't afford to sit back and watch all that (land) be destroyed so a few people can get rich now. One of these days the dear old federal government is going to have to come in and spend billions of dollars just to repair the damage that's already been done. And guess who will have the machines and the workmen to do the job? The same coal operators who made the mess in the first place will be hired to fix it back, and the taxpayers will bear the cost."

== Books by Harry M. Caudill ==
- Night Comes to the Cumberlands: A Biography of a Depressed Area (1962; Boston: Little, Brown and Co., 1963). ISBN 0-316-13212-8.
- My Land Is Dying (New York: E. P. Dutton, 1973). ISBN 0-525-47302-5.
- The Watches of the Night (Boston: Little, Brown and Co., 1976). ISBN 0-316-13218-7.
- A Darkness at Dawn: Appalachian Kentucky and the Future (Lexington: The University Press of Kentucky, 1976). ISBN 0-8131-0218-9.
- Dark Hills to Westward: The Saga of Jenny Wiley (1969; Ashland, KY: Jesse Stuart Foundation, 1994). ISBN 978-0-945084-45-7.
- The Senator from Slaughter County (1973; Ashland, KY: Jesse Stuart Foundation, 1997). ISBN 978-0-945084-66-2.
- The Mountain, the Miner, and the Lord and Other Tales from a Country Law Office (Lexington: The University Press of Kentucky, 1980).
- Slender is the Thread: Tales from a Country Law Office (Lexington: The University Press of Kentucky, 1987).
- Appalachian Wilderness: The Great Smoky Mountains (Epilogue written by Caudill; co-authored by Eliot Porter and Edward Abbey) (New York: Dutton, 1970) ISBN 978-0-525-05685-0.
- Theirs Be the Power: The Moguls of Kentucky (Campaign, IL:University of Illinois Press, 1983) ISBN 0-252-01029-9
