= Alston House (Columbia, South Carolina) =

Historic house in South Carolina, United States

- U.S. National Register of Historic Places
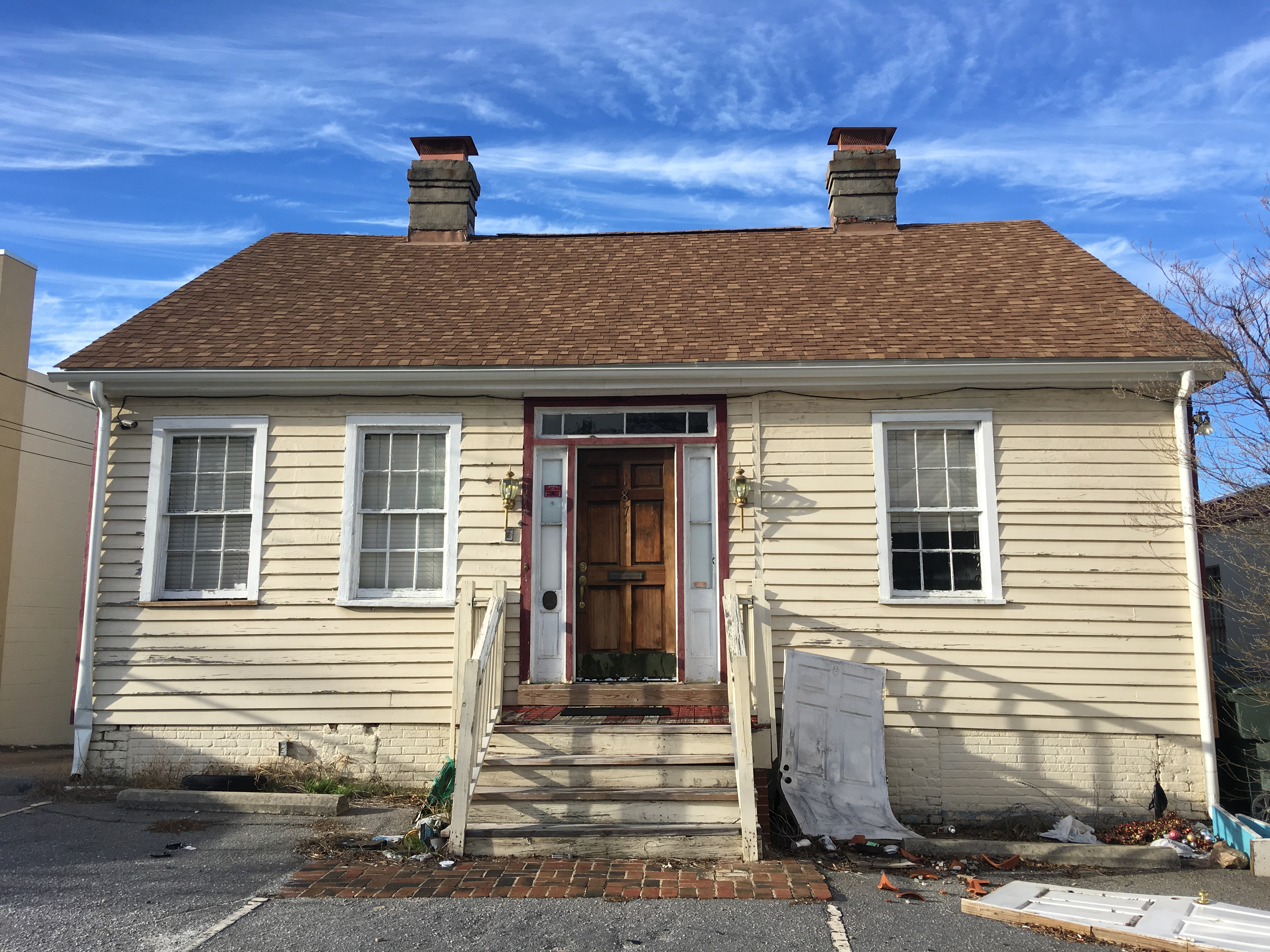

- Location within South Carolina Location within the United States
- Location: 1811 Gervais Street, Columbia, South Carolina
- Coordinates: 34°0′16″N 81°1′25″W
- Area: 0.20 acres (0.081 ha)
- Built: 1872
- Architectural style: Greek Revival
- MPS: Columbia MRA
- NRHP reference No.: 79003359
- Added to NRHP: March 2, 1979

Alston House (also known as McDuffie's Antiques) is a historic house located in Columbia, South Carolina.

== Description and history ==
The 1 1/2-story Greek Revival style house was built in 1872, and is significant for its historic architecture. It was added to the National Register of Historic Places on March 2, 1979.
