= Southeast Crescent Regional Commission =

U.S. federal commission

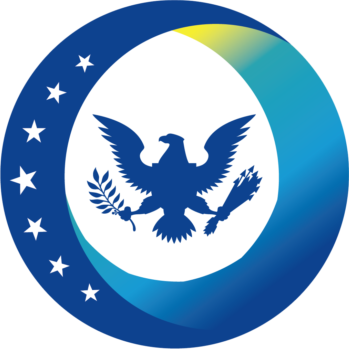
- Seal of the Southeast Crescent Regional Commission

Agency overview
- Formed: 2008
- Jurisdiction: Federal government of the United States
- Agency executive: Jennifer Clyburn Reed, Federal Co-Chair
- Website: scrc.gov

The Southeast Crescent Regional Commission (SCRC) is one of seven federal regional commissions and authorities authorized by the United States Congress to address instances of major economic distress in certain defined socioeconomic regions.

== Origins ==
The SCRC was created by the 2008 U.S. Farm Bill, which also created the Northern Border Regional Commission (NBRC) and the Southwest Border Regional Commission. All three commissions share common authorizing language modeled after the Appalachian Regional Commission (ARC). The SCRC received regular appropriations of $250,000 annually from FY2010 through FY2020 but did not form during that time due to the absence of an appointed federal co-chair.

On December 8, 2021, the U.S. Senate confirmed the SCRC’s first federal co-chairperson, Jennifer Clyburn Reed, thereby allowing the SCRC to convene and begin other activities.

=== Legislative history ===
The SCRC concept was first introduced by university researchers working on rural development issues in 1990 at Tuskegee University’s Annual Professional Agricultural Worker’s Conference for 1862 and 1890 Land-Grant Universities.

In 1994, the Southern Rural Development Commission Act was introduced in the United States House Committee on Agriculture, which would provide the statutory basis for a “Southern Black Belt Commission.” While the concept was not reintroduced in Congress until the 2000s, various nongovernmental initiatives sustained discussion and interest in the concept in the intervening period. Supportive legislation was reintroduced in 2002, which touched off other accompanying legislative efforts until the SCRC was authorized in 2008.

== Governance ==
In August 2021, U.S. President Joe Biden nominated Jennifer Clyburn Reed as Federal Co-Chair of the Southeast Crescent Regional Commission. The U.S. Senate confirmed her appointment on December 9, 2021. In this role, Reed will work on economic and poverty issues in the Southeastern United States.

The state co-chair is a Governor of one of the seven SCRC member states. McMaster served a two year term as state co-chair, and in June 2024, North Carolina Democratic Governor Roy Cooper was appointed to serve as state co-chair. Cooper left office on January 1, 2025.

== Service area ==
The SCRC was created to address economic distress in areas of Virginia, North Carolina, South Carolina, Georgia, Alabama, Mississippi, and Florida not served by the ARC or the Delta Regional Authority (DRA).
