= 2018–2019 United States federal government shutdown =

From December 22, 2018, until January 25, 2019, the United States federal government entered a shutdown. It was the second (Note: Not including the February 2018 funding lapse related to the January 2018 shutdown.) and final federal government shutdown involving furloughs during the first presidency of Donald Trump. It occurred when the 115th Congress and Trump could not agree on an appropriations bill to fund the operations of the federal government for the 2019 fiscal year, or a temporary continuing resolution that could extend the deadline for passing a bill. The Antideficiency Act prohibits federal departments or agencies from conducting non-essential operations without appropriations legislation in place. As a result, nine executive departments with around 800,000 employees had to shut down partially or in full, affecting about a quarter of government activities and causing employees to be furloughed or required to work without being paid. The Congressional Budget Office estimated the shutdown cost the American economy at least $11 billion USD, excluding indirect costs that were difficult to quantify.

The shutdown stemmed from an impasse over Trump's demand for $5.7 billion in federal funds for a U.S.–Mexico border wall. In December 2018, the Senate unanimously passed an appropriations bill without wall funding, and the bill appeared likely to be approved by the Republican-controlled House of Representatives and Trump. After Trump faced heavy criticism from some right-wing media outlets and pundits for appearing to back down on his campaign promise to "build the wall", he announced that he would not sign any appropriations bill that did not fund its construction. As a result, the House passed a stopgap bill with funding for the wall, but it was blocked in the Senate by the threat of a Democratic filibuster.

In January 2019, representatives elected in the November 2018 election took office, giving the Democrats a majority in the House. The House immediately voted to approve the appropriations bill that had previously passed the Senate unanimously and included no funding for the wall. For several weeks, Trump maintained that he would veto any bill that did not fund an entire border wall, and Republican Senate majority leader Mitch McConnell blocked the Senate from considering any appropriations legislation that Trump would not support, including the bill that had previously passed. Democrats and some Republicans opposed the shutdown and passed multiple bills to reopen the government, arguing that the government shutdown amounted to taking civil servants "hostage" and that negotiations could only begin once the government was reopened.

On January 25, 2019, Trump endorsed a stopgap bill to reopen the government until February 15 to allow for negotiations to take place on an appropriations bill. However, he reiterated his demand for border wall funding and said that he would shut down the government again or declare a national emergency and use military funding to build the wall if Congress did not appropriate the funds by February 15. With a veto-proof majority, both houses of Congress passed an appropriations bill on February 14 that included $1.375 billion for 55 miles of steel fencing along the border. The following day, Trump declared a national emergency to fund the wall, after being unsatisfied with the funding in the appropriations bill.

The end of the shutdown on January 25 occurred several hours after the Federal Aviation Administration was forced to limit flights at several major airports due to a high incidence of sick leave taken by air traffic controllers, who had been required to work during the shutdown without receiving paychecks. Though never claimed as a strike action, the development was widely credited as precipitating the shutdown's end.

Trump's approval rating dropped during the shutdown. A majority of Americans opposed exploitation of the shutdown as a negotiating strategy and held Trump responsible for the shutdown: A CBS News poll found that 71% of Americans considered the border wall "not worth the shutdown" and a Washington Post/ABC News poll found that 53% of Americans blamed Trump and Republicans for the shutdown, compared to 34% who blamed Democrats and 10% who blamed both parties.

== Background ==
During his 2016 campaign, then-candidate Trump falsely promised to build a wall along the Mexico–United States border for which Mexico would pay. The president of Mexico rejected the idea of providing any funding for a U.S. border wall. In 2018, Trump requested $22.7 billion in federal funding for some 700 miles (1,100 km) of barrier on the border, mostly to replace 654 miles (1,053 km) of aging fence built under the Secure Fence Act of 2006. On December 25, 2018, Trump reversed course, suggesting that he might accept 500 to 550 miles (800 to 890 km) of either mostly refurbished barrier (rather than new barriers in locations that did not previously have them) by November 2020. Trump's proposals and public statements on the wall have shifted widely over time, with varied proposals as to the design, material, length, height, and width of a wall.

In September 2018, Congress passed two "minibus" appropriations bills for the 2019 United States federal budget, which began on October 1, 2018. These bills combined five of the 12 regular appropriations bills covering 77% of federal discretionary funding, and included a continuing resolution until December 7 for the remaining agencies. On December 6, Congress passed a second continuing resolution to December 21, to give more time for negotiations on Trump's proposed border wall, which had been delayed due to the funeral of George H. W. Bush.

A Senate Homeland Security appropriations bill, negotiated by both parties and reported by the committee to the Senate, provided for $2.01 billion for border security, including funds for "approximately 65 miles of pedestrian fencing along the southwest border in the Rio Grande Valley Sector". The bill did not receive a vote on the Senate floor, although House Democratic Whip Steny Hoyer indicated that such a proposal could be acceptable to House Democrats. Senate Minority Leader Chuck Schumer (D-NY) said the Democratic Party would not support $7.31 billion for the border wall. At a press conference before the government shutdown, he noted "the $1.6 billion for border security negotiated by Democrats and Republicans is our position. We believe that is the right way to go."

=== Beginning of shutdown ===
Donald Trump meets with Nancy Pelosi and Chuck Schumer on December 11, 2018, stating "I will be the one to shut it down."

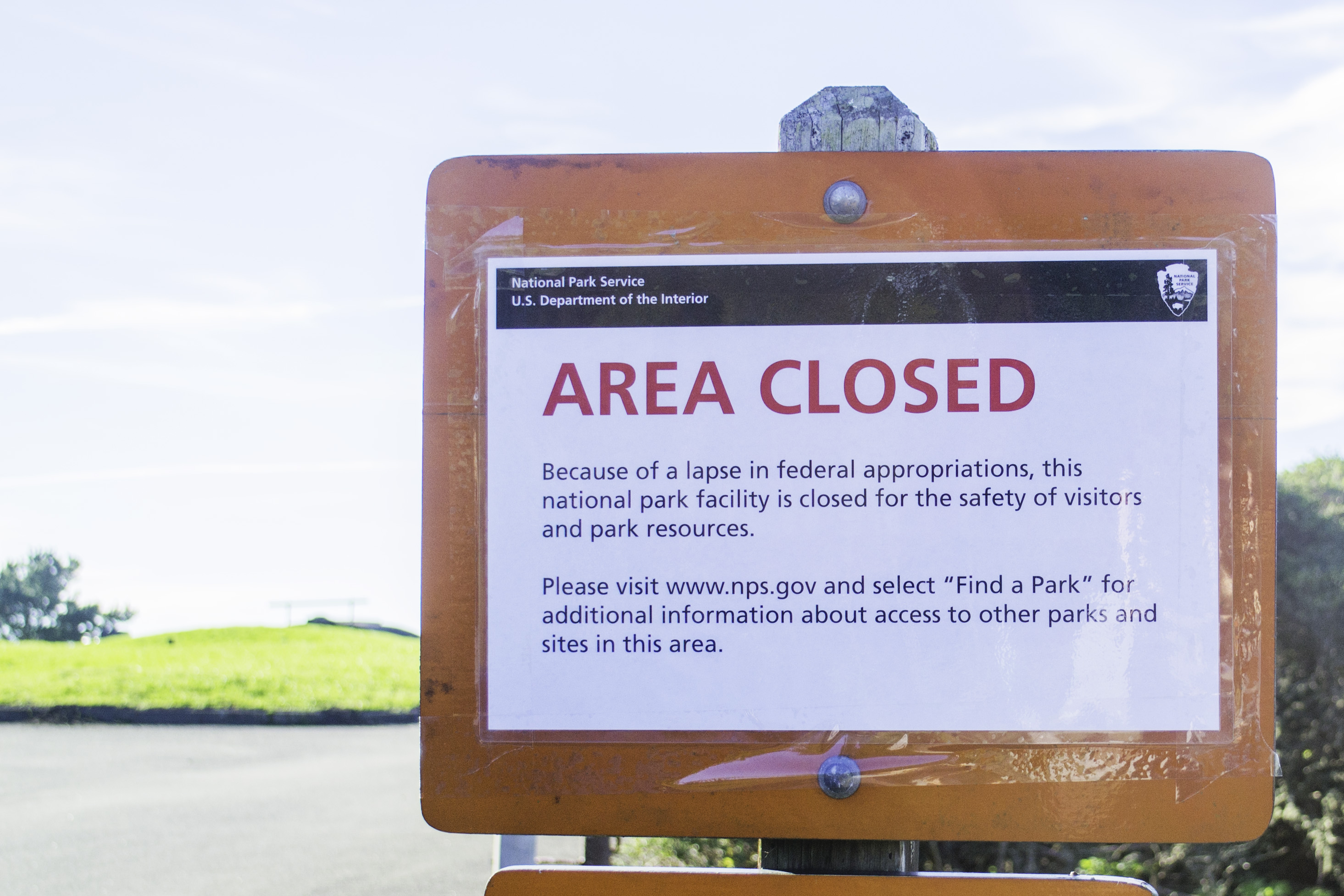
Muir Beach Overlook in San Francisco, closed for the shutdown in December 2018

On December 11, President Trump held a televised meeting with Speaker-designate Nancy Pelosi and Senate Minority Leader Chuck Schumer in the Oval Office and asked them to support an appropriation of $5.7 billion for funding of a border wall along the U.S. southern border with Mexico. They refused, resulting in an argument between Trump and both Congressional leaders. During the contentious discussion, Trump remarked, "I am proud to shut down the government for border security ... I will be the one to shut [the government] down. I'm not going to blame you for it ... I will take the mantle. I will be the one to shut it down." Schumer replied, "We shouldn't shut down the government over a dispute." Ten days later, Trump blamed Democrats for the impending shutdown.

Three days later, Politico reported that Trump was willing to sign a bill with no funding for a border wall that delayed a government shutdown into 2019 and the new Congress. On December 18, following a meeting with Trump, Senate Majority Leader Mitch McConnell said that the government would not shut down on December 22 and that Trump was "flexible" over funding for a border wall. Senate Appropriations Committee Chairman Richard Shelby commented that the most likely resolution was a bill that funded the government until early February. Schumer added that his caucus would "very seriously" consider such a bill and Senate Majority Whip John Cornyn said "I don't know anybody on the Hill that wants a shutdown, and I think all the president's advisers are telling him this would not be good."

On December 19, the Senate passed a second continuing resolution (H.R. 695) that would fund the government until February 8, 2019. Pelosi announced that House Democrats would support the measure, meaning it would overcome opposition from conservative Republicans and pass the House. On December 20, following increased criticism from conservative media, pundits, and political figures, Trump reversed his position and declared that he would not sign any funding bill that did not include border wall funding. The same day, the House passed a continuing resolution that included $5 billion for the wall and $8 billion in disaster aid. This bill failed in the Senate. Trump's changing position caused consternation among Senate Republicans.

== Shutdown ==
The shutdown started December 22 and Trump announced that he would cancel his planned trip to Mar-a-Lago for Christmas and stay in Washington, D.C. The meaning of the term "wall" was expected to be an aspect of the negotiations.

=== Legislation ===
==== 115th Congress ====
Congress adjourned on December 22 for the Christmas and holiday season, with many predicting that the shutdown would not be resolved until the start of the 116th Congress. The Senate reconvened on December 27 for four minutes, with Senator Pat Roberts (R-KS) presiding over the session. The House briefly reconvened as well, with Majority Whip Steve Scalise (R-LA) saying that members should not expect any further votes for the rest of 2018. Representative Jim McGovern (D-MA) went to the House floor to try to force consideration of a short-term funding bill to end the shutdown that the Senate had already passed, but the Republican Speaker-pro-tem refused to let him speak.

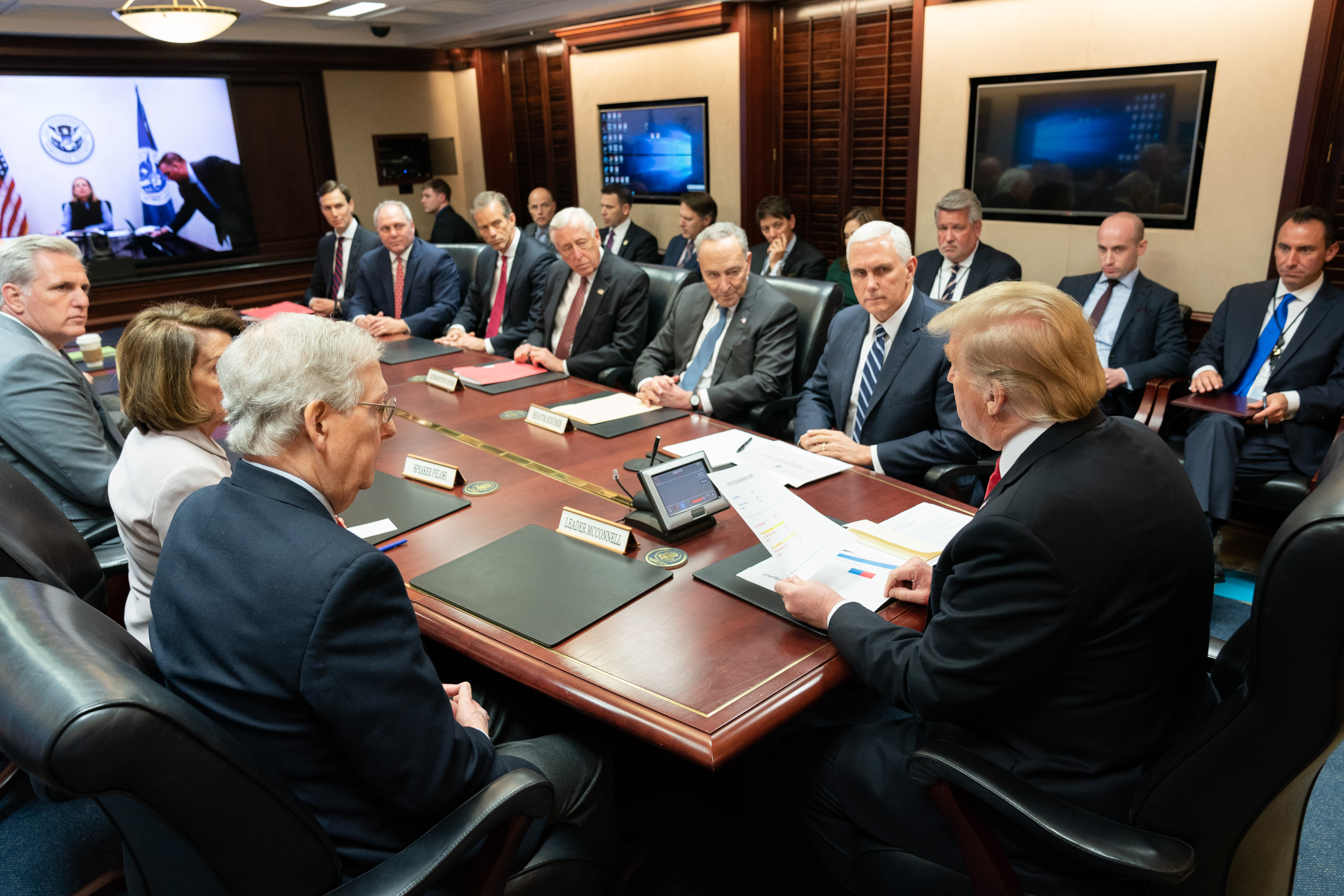
President Trump meets with Congressional leadership in the White House Situation Room on January 2, 2019

Congress then adjourned again until December 31, 2018, for a pro forma session. On January 2, 2019, the last full day of the 115th Congress, there was a pro forma session scheduled to last several minutes.

==== 116th Congress ====
===== House =====
The new Congress was sworn in on January 3, 2019, and one of the first orders of business in the House after electing the Speaker and swearing in the new members was a continuing resolution to fund the Department of Homeland Security until February 8 (H.J.Res. 1), which passed by a vote of 239–192; and a package combining five appropriation bills funding the rest of the government for the remainder of the fiscal year (H.R. 21), passed by a vote of 242–189. The bills contained $1.3 billion of funding for border security, but no additional funding for a border wall.

Beginning on January 9, the Democratic-controlled House voted on four appropriations bills individually:

- Financial Services and General Government Appropriations Act, 2019 (H.R. 264) – bill to restore appropriations to the Treasury (including the Internal Revenue Service), federal judiciary, District of Columbia, and a number of independent agencies, including the Federal Communications Commission, Federal Trade Commission, General Services Administration, and Securities and Exchange Commission. The House passed the legislation on January 9, on a 240–188 vote, with every Democrat and eight Republicans voting yes, and all other Republicans voting no.
- Agriculture, Rural Development, Food and Drug Administration, and Related Agencies Appropriations Act, 2019 (H.R. 265) – bill to restore appropriations to the Department of Agriculture (including food stamps), the Food and Drug Administration, and related entities. On January 10, the House passed this bill 243–183.
- Transportation, Housing and Urban Development, and Related Agencies Appropriations Act, 2019 (H.R. 267) – bill to restore Transportation and Housing and Urban Development (including some federal mortgage programs). On January 10, the House passed this bill 244–180.
- Department of the Interior, Environment, and Related Agencies Appropriations Act, 2019 (H.R. 266) – bill to restore appropriations to the Interior Department, Environmental Protection Agency, and other agencies, including the Smithsonian Institution. On January 11, ten House Republicans voted with Democrats in a 240–179 vote to end the shutdown of Interior-Environment programs. It was the most recent of a "series of standalone appropriations measures" the House sent to the Senate.

This strategy has been compared to one used by Republicans during the 2013 shutdown in the form of a series of fourteen mini-continuing resolutions.

===== Senate =====
Senate Majority Leader Mitch McConnell vowed that the Senate would not consider the House bills to reopen the government, indicating that Senate Republicans would not support any bill unless it had Trump's support. In January 2019, McConnell and Senate Republicans came under increased pressure to break the impasse and reopen the government. Three Republican Senators—Susan Collins of Maine, Lisa Murkowski of Alaska, and Cory Gardner of Colorado—called for an end to the shutdown. Senators Collins and Gardner said they supported the House's budget bills to end the shutdown. West Virginia Senator Shelley Moore Capito said that she could support ending the shutdown provided border wall talks continued. Pat Roberts of Kansas said that shutdowns "never work" and only turned affected federal workers into "pawns" and that, although the time had not yet come for Senate Republicans to override any possible Trump veto and end the shutdown, "we're getting pretty close." Johnny Isakson of Georgia echoed that sentiment, saying that support for McConnell's refusal to support bills that do not include funding for a wall would not last indefinitely: "There's a time when that may run out."

On January 16, McConnell again blocked the House appropriation bills to reopen the government from being considered on the Senate floor. The following day, McConnell blocked consideration of bills to reopen most of the closed government agencies for a third time. On January 23, McConnell blocked a bill to reopen most of the government for the fourth time.

On January 22, McConnell stated that the Senate would be voting on two different bills to end the shutdown on January 24. The first vote is on a bill to reopen the government which includes Trump's proposal to provide $5.7 billion for a border wall and temporary protections to some immigration classes. The other bill is a three-week continuing resolution to fund 25% of the government through February 8.

On January 22, Senator Mark Warner introduced a bill to keep the federal government running in the event of future shutdown events. The bill is called the "Stop Shutdowns Transferring Unnecessary Pain and Inflicting Damage in the Coming Years Act" or the "Stop STUPIDITY Act".

==== Late January legislative votes ====
On January 24, the Senate held two votes on competing Democratic and Republican proposals to end the shutdown. The Democratic proposal was largely similar to the measure that had previously passed the Senate unanimously in the 115th Congress, and then been passed by the Democratic-controlled House in the 116th Congress. It provided funding for the government with no money for the border wall. The Republican proposal incorporated Trump's proposal, which would fund a border wall; temporarily extend TPS and DACA for three years, but would substantially narrow eligibility for DACA; and make significant legal changes to make it more difficult for persons escaping violence and persecution to be granted asylum in the United States. Neither proposal was able to attain the 60 votes needed for passage. The Trump plan failed in a 50–47 vote. The Democratic plan failed in a 52–44 vote. Most Republicans voted for Trump's plan and against the Democratic plan. Most Democrats voted for the Democratic plan and against Trump's plan. Republicans Tom Cotton and Mike Lee voted against both plans. Democrat Joe Manchin and Republicans Lamar Alexander, Susan Collins, Cory Gardner, Johnny Isakson, Lisa Murkowski and Mitt Romney voted for both plans. Not voting on either were Republicans Rand Paul and Jim Risch and Democrat Jacky Rosen. Republican Richard Burr voted for Trump's plan and did not vote on the Democratic plan.

On January 25, House Democrats prepared a compromise proposal to reopen the government, which would provide $5 billion for border security but no wall construction. However, the shutdown ended that same day.

=== Negotiations ===
On January 4, after the new Congress was sworn-in and Pelosi regained the speakership, she and Schumer, as well as congressional Republican leadership met with Trump at the White House. Pelosi and Schumer argued that the shutdown needed to end and reported that Trump refused. They said that Trump threatened to "keep the government closed for a very long period of time. Months or even years." Later that day, Trump admitted to "absolutely" making that threat, adding, "I'm very proud of doing what I'm doing." Trump then said that he was considering declaring a national emergency to use military funding for the wall. At the meeting, Trump reprimanded his acting chief of staff Mick Mulvaney for attempting to propose a compromise between Trump's $5.7 billion demand for a border wall and the Democrats' proposal of $1.3 billion for border security.

President Trump addressing the nation on January 8, 2019

Trump addressed the nation from the Oval Office at 9 p.m. EST on January 8, in a nationally televised address broadcast on both network and cable television. In his speech, Trump asserted that there was a "growing humanitarian and security crisis" on the Mexico–United States border that could only be solved by appropriating $5.7 billion for construction of a steel wall. Trump did not make any new proposals in his speech to break the impasse. Immediately after Trump's speech, Schumer and Pelosi delivered a response on behalf of the Democrats, in which they demanded an end to the shutdown and said: "President Trump must stop holding the American people hostage, must stop manufacturing a crisis and must reopen the government."

==== January 9 meeting ====
Trump met with congressional leadership again on January 9, in a meeting lasting 14 minutes. Trump asked Pelosi, "Will you agree to my wall?" and when she replied that she would not, Trump said "bye-bye" and walked out of the meeting, later declaring it "a total waste of time". Schumer accused Trump of throwing a "temper tantrum" and slamming his hands on the table. Trump rebuked Schumer's comments on Twitter. Vice President Mike Pence and House Minority Leader Kevin McCarthy said that Trump remained calm and never raised his voice. On January 10, Pelosi described the preceding day's meeting with Trump as "a setup" staged by White House aides so that Trump could walk out of the meeting. Pelosi described Trump as "un-presidential"; accused him of "exploiting this situation in a way that enhances his power"; and said: "I don't think he really wants a solution. I think he loves the distraction."

After Trump walked out of the January 9 meeting with congressional Democratic leaders, no further negotiations were conducted. Several Republican senators met in the office of South Carolina Senator Lindsey Graham, a close Trump ally, after the meeting to discuss a compromise to end the shutdown. They discussed agreeing to Trump's demand for border wall funding and offering the Democrats help for Dreamers, refugee protections and extensions to H-2B visas. On January 13, Graham proposed that Trump agree to a congressional vote to reopen the government pending the resumption of negotiations. Graham suggested that if Trump and congressional Democrats did not come to an agreement at that time, Trump could declare a national emergency. Trump rejected this proposal the next day.

==== Trump's proposal ====
President Trump announced a proposal to end the shutdown from the White House Diplomatic Reception Room on January 19, 2019.

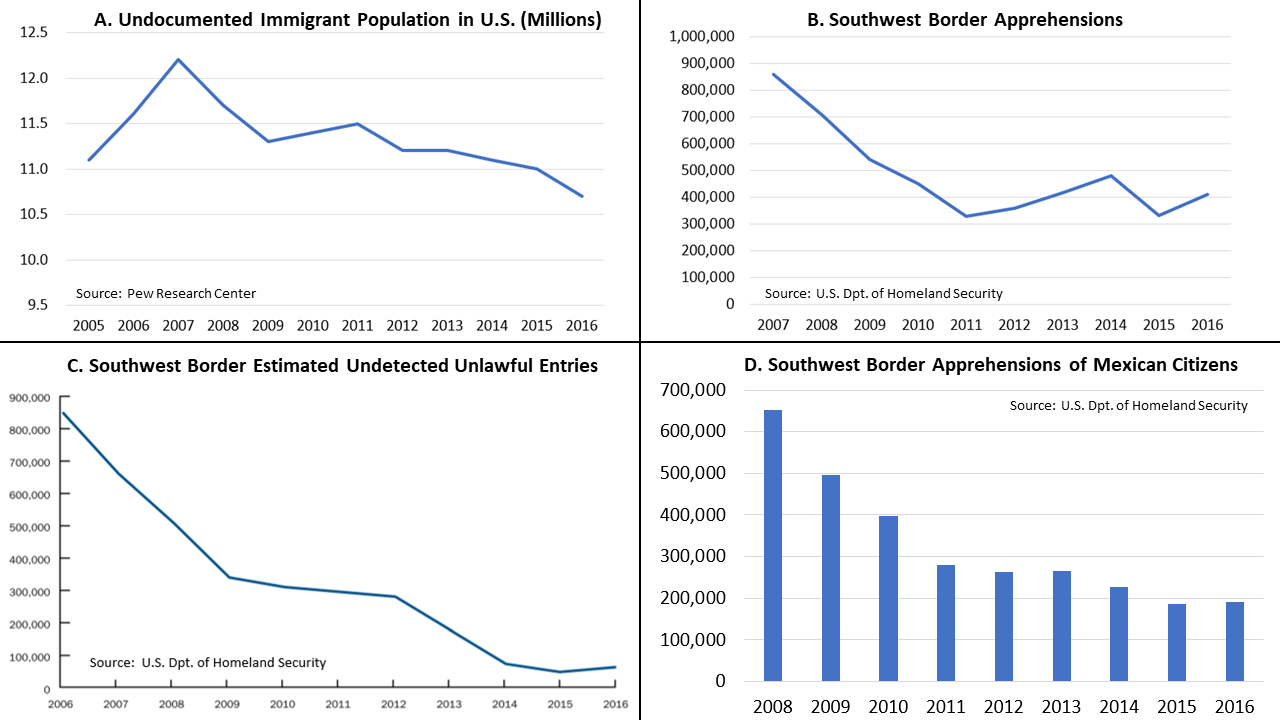
Border statistics: Both the population of unauthorized immigrants in the U.S. and southwestern border apprehensions have declined significantly over the past decade.

On January 19, Trump proposed a temporary extension of the two programs that protect about 700,000 immigrants from deportation—Temporary Protected Status (TPS) and Deferred Action for Childhood Arrivals (DACA)—in exchange for funding for the border wall. The protections would be temporary, with no path to citizenship. Trump had previously revoked TPS for people from a number of Latin American and African countries, and taken steps to rescind DACA. In his remarks at the White House, Trump referred to a "barrier" rather than a "wall" and indicated that he aimed to erect "steel barriers in high priority locations" rather than "a 2,000-mile concrete structure from sea to sea".

In addition to funding a border wall, the 1,300-page Republican bill released after Trump made his proposal would make major changes to U.S. immigration policy (which were not included in Trump's public announcement). The legislation would severely restrict the ability of children from Honduras, Guatemala and El Salvador to apply for asylum in the United States. Specifically, participation in the Central American Minors Program would be subject to an annual cap and migrant children would be barred from applying for asylum in person at the border, and only migrant children with a "qualified" parent in the U.S. would be eligible to apply. The bill would also create a new, more burdensome application process for TPS holders, and would exclude TPS holders from Sudan, Somalia, and Yemen. The American Immigration Lawyers Association government relations director said that the proposal "would categorically block tens of thousands of children from ever applying for asylum", while a Cato Institute immigration analyst wrote that the proposal would not extend DACA, but rather replace it with "a totally different program that will exclude untold thousands of Dreamers who would have been eligible under DACA".

Democrats rejected Trump's proposal. In a speech on the Senate floor, Minority Leader Chuck Schumer said: "The president's proposal is one-sided, harshly partisan and was made in bad faith. The asylum changes are a poison pill, if there ever was one." House Speaker Nancy Pelosi said extending the DACA proposal temporarily was "unacceptable" and a "non-starter" because it did not "represent a good faith effort to restore certainty to people's lives". Analysts pointed out that Trump had previously rejected a deal that would have provided funding for the border wall in exchange for further protection for DACA recipients. Conversely, Republicans reacted positively to Trump's proposal, and Mitch McConnell said he would bring it to a vote in the Senate.

=== Related disputes ===
==== Trump's threat to declare national emergency ====
President Trump states on January 14, 2019, "I'm not looking to call a national emergency [...] I have the absolute legal right to call it but I'm not looking to do that because this is too simple."

During the shutdown, on January 8 in a press conference, a reporter asked Trump if he was considering declaring a national emergency, to which Trump replied, "I have the absolute right to do national emergency if I want" and suggested that he could declare an emergency. After this, Trump repeatedly threatened to declare a national emergency to unilaterally order wall construction without congressional authorization. Some of Trump's advisors, including his son-in-law Jared Kushner, reportedly attempted to dissuade him from doing so. Administration officials considered diverting hurricane-relief and wildfire-relief funds from a $13.9 billion February 2018 emergency supplemental appropriations bill (for disaster relief in Puerto Rico, Florida, Texas and California, among other places) in order to fund a wall, and directed the U.S. Army Corps of Engineers to look into this possibility.

An attempt by Trump to invoke emergency powers would almost certainly have prompted a lengthy legal challenge in court. Democrats responded that Trump lacked the authority to declare a national emergency; Representative Adam Schiff called it a "non-starter" and said that "if Harry Truman couldn't nationalize the steel industry during wartime, this President doesn't have the power to declare an emergency and build a multibillion dollar wall on the border." Democratic Representative Nydia Velázquez said the notion of redirecting disaster-relief funds to a border wall was "beyond appalling". Presidents have declared emergencies in the past, but none has "involved funding a policy goal after failing to win congressional approval". Yale Law School professor Bruce Ackerman wrote that the declaration of a national emergency to build a wall as Trump suggested would be unconstitutional and illegal. Other scholars, such as Elizabeth Goitein of the Brennan Center for Justice, believed that Trump could make a colorable argument that diverting military-construction appropriations for border-wall construction was legal, but that doing so would be an abuse of power. Law professor Ilya Somin stated that in the unlikely case that Trump succeeded in using the emergency powers in this way, it would set a dangerous precedent, which Republicans would come to regret next time the president was a Democrat.

On January 11, Trump—while maintaining he has the authority to do so anytime—said he was not in any rush to declare a national emergency to secure wall funding, saying he would rather see Congress "do its job" and that the Democrats "should come back and vote". The next day he again threatened to use emergency powers if Democrats did not "come to their senses".

==== State of the Union Address ====
Pelosi and Trump's initial letters

On January 16, Pelosi sent a letter to Trump that indicated the House would be unavailable for the 2019 State of the Union Address that was scheduled for January 29. Pelosi wrote, "Sadly, given the security concerns and unless government reopens this week, I suggest that we work together to determine another suitable date after government has reopened for this address or for you to consider delivering your State of the Union address in writing to the Congress on Jan. 29." The delivery of the State of the Union address had been delayed or substantially changed on only two occasions since 1913. In a letter sent to the Speaker the next day, Trump said she would not be allowed to take military transport aircraft on scheduled visits to Brussels, Egypt, and Afghanistan. Trump replied, "We will reschedule this seven-day excursion when the shutdown is over." Pelosi and a congressional delegation had planned on visiting overseas American military personnel.

Trump and Pelosi's second letters

On January 23, Trump sent a letter to Pelosi insisting that there were no security concerns and that he would hold the State of the Union Address as scheduled. Trump wrote, "Therefore, I will be honoring your invitation, and fulfilling my Constitutional duty, to deliver important information to the people and Congress of the United States of America regarding the State of our Union." In a letter sent in reply, Pelosi stated that the House would not consider a concurrent resolution to authorize the State of the Union Address in the House Chamber until the shutdown ended, writing, "Again, I look forward to welcoming you to the House on a mutually agreeable date for this address when government has been opened."

Trump later stated he would look for an alternative, but then retracted that statement in a pair of tweets announcing that he would wait until the end of the shutdown to give the address in the House Chamber.

=== Resolution ===
President Trump announced a 3-week agreement to end the shutdown from the White House Rose Garden on January 25, 2019.

On January 25, Trump announced his support for a three-week funding measure that would reopen the government until February 15. The deal, which also moved forward with long-term Department of Homeland Security funding, did not include funds for a wall. As expected, the agreement provided federal employees with back pay. Both the Senate and House of Representatives passed the funding measure by voice vote, sending the resolution to the President's desk. Trump signed the bill the same day, ending the shutdown.

Later in January, Republican senators voted unanimously against a bill to provide back pay to federal contractors.

== Aftermath ==
Without legislation enacted by February 15, a new partial shutdown would have begun, three weeks after the last ended. A bipartisan group of senators and representatives reached an agreement "in principle" on February 11, but Trump did not say whether he would sign it. Included was $1.375 billion for 55 miles of steel border fencing. On February 13, it was reported that, against the wishes of Democratic leaders and many Republicans, Trump was blocking the provision of back pay to federal contractors who were still out of pocket from the shutdown. Both houses passed the bill February 14 with enough votes to override a veto if that happened.

On February 15, at the White House Rose Garden, Trump announced that he had signed the spending bill to keep the government open. He also declared a national emergency, hoping to get access to $8 billion to use for border security.

== Effects ==
Agencies funded by two "minibus" appropriations bills passed in September 2018 were not affected by the shutdown. About 380,000 federal employees were furloughed, and an additional 420,000 employees for the affected agencies were expected to work with their pay delayed until the end of the shutdown, totaling 800,000 workers affected out of 2.1 million civilian non-postal federal employees. As only about a quarter of the government was shut down, many people who are not federal employees did not fully realize the effects of the shutdown.

=== Agencies ===
According to H.R. 5895 and H.R. 6157, these were the affected agencies:

- Department of State
- Department of the Treasury
- Department of Justice
- Most of the Department of the Interior
- Department of Agriculture
- Department of Commerce
- Department of Housing and Urban Development
- Department of Transportation
- Department of Homeland Security
- Some Department of Health and Human Services agencies
  - Food and Drug Administration
  - Indian Health Service
  - Agency for Toxic Substances and Disease Registry
  - Superfund Research Program
- Executive Office of the President
- Most independent agencies
- Judicial Branch

Unaffected agencies include, according to H.R. 5895 and H.R. 6157:

- Department of Defense
- Department of Labor
- Most of the Department of Health and Human Services
- Department of Energy
- Department of Education
- Department of Veterans Affairs
- Some Department of the Interior agencies
  - Bureau of Reclamation
  - Central Utah Project
- District of Columbia (excluding courts)
- Legislative Branch
- Social Security Administration
- Nuclear Regulatory Commission
- Appalachian Regional Commission
- Defense Nuclear Facilities Safety Board
- Delta Regional Authority
- Denali Commission
- Northern Border Regional Commission
- Southeast Crescent Regional Commission
- Nuclear Waste Technical Review Board
- American Battle Monuments Commission
- U.S. Court of Appeals for Veterans Claims
- Cemeterial Expenses of the Army, including Arlington National Cemetery and Soldiers' and Airmen's Home National Cemetery
- Armed Forces Retirement Home
- Central Intelligence Agency Retirement and Disability System Fund
- Intelligence Community Management Account
- Committee for Purchase from People Who Are Blind or Severely Disabled
- Corporation for National and Community Service
- Corporation for Public Broadcasting
- Federal Mediation and Conciliation Service
- Federal Mine Safety and Health Review Commission
- Institute of Museum and Library Services
- Medicaid and CHIP Payment and Access Commission
- Medicare Payment Advisory Commission
- National Council on Disability
- National Labor Relations Board
- National Mediation Board
- Occupational Safety and Health Review Commission
- Railroad Retirement Board

=== On federal employees ===
A sample letter provided by the Office of Personnel Management

Jobs affected included staff throughout the United States, not just DC area employees. FBI agents, federal corrections officers, FDA inspectors, NASA employees, TSA staff, Border Patrol staff and CBP officers, census staff, National Park Service staff, members of the Coast Guard, and Federal Aviation Administration air traffic controllers either worked without pay or were furloughed, with increasing numbers of unpaid essential employees failing to show up for work.

On January 11, 800,000 workers for agencies shutdown or furloughed missed their first paycheck. Federal workers normally receive pay on federal holidays, which include Christmas, New Year's Day and potentially Martin Luther King Jr. Day. The shutdown affected the employees' entitlement to paid holidays due to the shutdown. Unemployment assistance to federal workers furloughed under the government shutdown varied by locality. Only non-reporting workers were eligible for assistance, whereas furloughed workers who still reported to work were not. Workers who received unemployment assistance were required pay it back after the shut down ended and they received backpay. Some furloughed workers sought other employment opportunities while they were idled. However, external employment must meet agency-specific ethics guidelines, and mandatory reviews of external employment were also curtailed as most ethics officials were also furloughed. Federal employees were not able to use vacation or sick leave during the shutdown so scheduled holiday vacation time either became unpaid if the worker was deemed non-essential or was cancelled if the worker was deemed essential. In many cases unused leave over a certain threshold expired at year-end, but employees who had leave scheduled in advance of the shutdown did not have "use or lose" leave balances deducted from their accrued leave. Many furloughed employees took to crowd-funding campaigns to raise cash to replace missed paychecks, but these types of solicitations also run afoul of government ethics rules.

"Managing Your Finances During a Furlough" by the United States Coast Guard

As furloughed federal workers and their families shared stories of their hardships, such as not being able to meet rent or mortgage payments and missed bills, the hashtag "#ShutdownStories" went viral on social media. The federal government's Office of Personnel Management (OPM) responded by publishing sample letters that employees could send to their creditors. One read, in part, "I am a Federal employee who has recently been furloughed due to a lack of funding of my agency. Because of this, my income has been severely cut and I am unable to pay the entire cost of my mortgage, along with my other expenses." Other federal workers reached out to other news outlets to share stories about having to stretch their budgets and the impact of the shutdown on their families. In addition to being unable to meet rent or pay bills, many federal workers around the country were unable to pay for groceries and turned to food banks. One federal prison guard in Louisiana attempted suicide after posting about the financial pressures of the shutdown on Facebook.

The OPM also suggested that employees who had landlords write: "I would like to discuss with you the possibility of trading my services to perform maintenance (e.g. painting, carpentry work) in exchange for partial rent payments" and suggested those who lacked funds to pay bills should hire personal attorneys to assist them. Other organizations also posted advice on how to "find supplemental income"; the Coast Guard suggested that Coast Guard members "have a garage sale, offer to watch children, walk pets or house sit" while furloughed.

On January 4, The Washington Post reported that because the shutdown was triggered by the failure to enact spending bills that continued a federal government pay freeze, hundreds of senior Trump administration political appointees would receive a roughly $10,000 pay raise the following day. White House press secretary Sarah Sanders said the pending pay raise was an "unnecessary byproduct of the shutdown".

On January 10, the Senate approved by unanimous consent a bill (S.24, the Government Employee Fair Treatment Act of 2019) providing that furloughed federal employees would receive back pay for the period of the furlough once appropriations were restored; the bill was approved the next day by the House on a vote of 411–7. Trump signed the bill into law on January 16.

=== On Native Americans ===
Native American tribes were not paid for treaties negotiated with the United States government. These treaties specified that the federal government must provide funding for health clinics, employee salaries, education, infrastructure and other services, which were not paid during the shutdown. Native lands are "owned, managed and maintained by the federal government". Native Americans who receive a per capita check for profits from oil and gas sales from tribal land did not receive check for the month of February. Roads were not plowed on tribal land, and some areas received significant snowfall. This caused people of the Navajo Nation to become trapped inside their homes. Food services, which fed 90,000 Native Americans in 2017, were halted.

Native American communities had a high percentage of individuals who worked for the federal government and lost income during the shutdown. In North and South Dakota, one of the largest employers is the Indian Health Service. The Chippewa tribe reported an economic loss of nearly $100,000 daily in funds that the federal government was supposed to provide as a treaty obligation.

The Bureau of Indian Affairs (BIA) was closed for the shutdown. However, 60 percent of the Indian Health Service (IHS) continued to work without pay. IHS provides care for 2.2 million Native Americans and on January 23, began to deny care that was not considered "life threatening". The Bureau of Indian Education was able to stay open because it was funded on a different schedule. Unlike other government shutdowns, there was little outreach from the Trump Administration to Native Americans and the Chippewa tribe in Michigan was given a 24-hour notice that the shutdown would take place and affect the tribe.

=== On the military ===
The only military branch that was affected by the shutdown was the Coast Guard because it was part of the Department of Homeland Security, while the Navy, Army, Air Force, and Marine Corps were all funded through the Department of Defense. Officials were able to fund payment on December 31, 2018, but were not able to do so for the paychecks of January 15 and 30, 2019, along with the pay and benefits for civilian workers and retirees. During the shutdown, the Coast Guard continued to engage in patrolling the American coastline and carrying out overseas missions in locations such as the Persian Gulf along with the Navy and in the Caribbean. Other issues arose in the payment processes for Coast Guard members Tricare Health and Dental Program payments, although the individuals were still covered.

Military schools, such as the Coast Guard Academy and the National War College, lost funding due to the shutdown and the schools had to work to find funds to pay professors.

Although the Department of Defense was not shut down, the February 4, 2019, date for release of the Pentagon's 2020 budget was delayed by at least one month. This had repercussions on the interim period which is usually used by Pentagon planners for adjustments before the 2020 fiscal year which will begin in October 2019. The White House Office of Management and Budget, which oversees the Pentagon request, was shut down when the Pentagon budget arrived in December, and remained inactive, so no work was done on the budget.

On February 25, 2019, the Pentagon's counter-drug (interdiction) funding has up to $85 million not yet obligated, but that money was planned for the known corridors in El Paso, Tucson, Yuma, and El Centro for border fencing, lighting, and road projects, so any funds which might possibly be intended for additional projects elsewhere along the border must be obligated by September 30, 2019, in order not to affect the known corridors. Otherwise appropriations above the $85 million not yet obligated for additional interdiction border projects will have to be approved by additional Congressional appropriations, to reach the $2 billion target.

=== Economic impact ===
The Congressional Budget Office estimated the total cost of the shutdown to be $11 billion.

A January 28, 2019 Congressional Budget Office report estimated that the 35-day partial government shutdown cost the American economy at least $11 billion, including $3 billion in permanent losses; the CBO estimate excluded indirect costs that were difficult to quantify. The furloughing of 145,000 federal workers and 112,500 federal contractors in the Washington, D.C. metropolitan area cost the regional economy $119 million each day, or 7.3% of the region's total output. That reduced GDP by over $2.8 billion in the Washington DC area alone. The shutdown also had a noticeable impact on hunger in the national capital region: food pantries in Washington, D.C. and Northern Virginia reported an increase of around 10% in the number of people coming to pick up groceries, with most of that increase coming from federal workers and contractors.

Fitch Ratings warned that an extended shutdown might lead to a downgrade in the U.S.'s Triple-A credit rating if lawmakers were unable to pass a budget or manage the debt ceiling. That in turn would make borrowing more costly for companies and American households, because it is the benchmark for many other lines of credit. The only time the U.S. credit rating has been downgraded by S&P was during the 2011 debt ceiling crisis.

Some economists believed that an extended shutdown would weaken consumer confidence and heighten the risk of pushing the U.S. economy into a recession. Between 800,000 federal government employees and some 4 million federal contractors, the shutdown directly affected nearly 3% of the U.S. labor force; in a typical recession, unemployment increases 2–4%. The reduction in spending by those households combined with the reduction of government services could have macroeconomic results similar to a typical recession. The shutdown had an adverse effect on the budgets of state and local governments, as states covered some federal services (particularly the most vulnerable) during the shutdown.

By mid-January 2019, the White House Council of Economic Advisors estimated that each week of the shutdown reduced GDP growth by 0.1 percentage points, the equivalent of 1.2 points per quarter. CEA chairman Kevin Hassett later acknowledged that GDP growth could decline to zero in the first quarter of 2019 if the shutdown lasted the entire quarter.

==== Taxes ====
As tax season began in the United States on January 28, some 46,000 Internal Revenue Service workers were called back to work to ensure tax refunds and returns were not affected by the shutdown. The recalled workers allowed the department to continue operations that were automatic and those deemed necessary for the safety of human life or protection of government property, such as processing electronic returns, returns with payments, mailing tax forms, appeals, criminal law enforcement investigations and technical support.

=== Food stamps, inspections, and school lunches ===
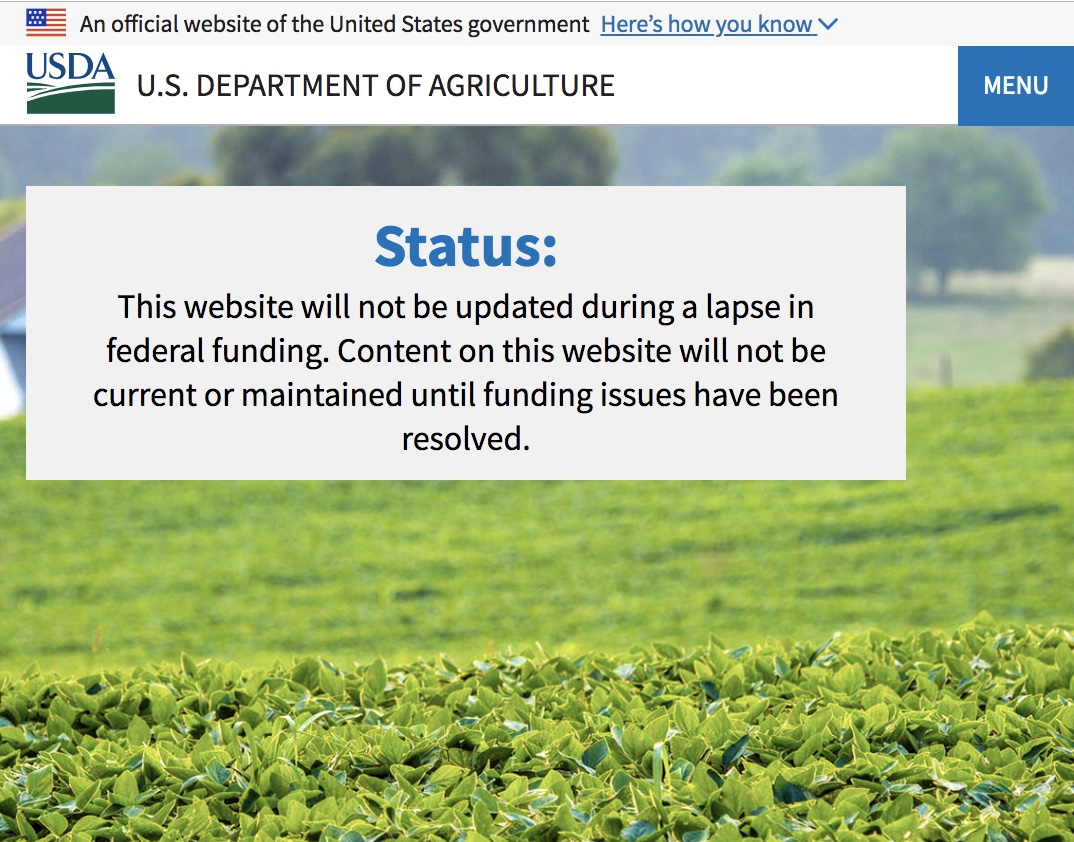
USDA's website during the shutdown as of January 13, 2019

During the shutdown, 95% of federal staff for the USDA's Food and Nutrition Services were furloughed. The Supplemental Nutrition Assistance Program (SNAP), the food-stamp program, could be funded through a $3 billion contingency fund appropriated by Congress in 2018; if the shutdown had continued through March 2019, those funds would have been exhausted, leaving some 38 million Americans without food stamps and endangering food security. Concerns were raised that continuation of the shutdown could delay the issuance of some $140 billion in tax refunds from the Internal Revenue Service (IRS).

The Food and Drug Administration (FDA) oversees most of the food supply in the U.S. In early January, Dr. Scott Gottlieb, the FDA commissioner, reported that the FDA suspended food inspections. He noted that inspection of foreign food was continuing as "almost normal", because they are considered vital. Around January 14, "high-risk" food inspections resumed. As of January 22, 2019, 46 percent of the FDA were working, though 20 percent of them were working without pay. During the shutdown, two new recalls for contamination with Listeria or Salmonella took place. Consumer advocacy groups advised of food safety issues during the shutdown. Food safety attorney, Bill Marler, advocated against eating "fresh, uncooked products on the market place". Because there was a shortage of FDA inspectors, many imported perishable items, such as produce or flowers, were at risk of spoilage. Meat and some egg products are inspected by the USDA's Food Safety and Inspection Service. Federal legislation required those inspectors to remain working without pay.

School administrations raised concern about how to feed children who purchase food at the schools for lunch, as funding concerns caused some districts to conserve food and funding. Many limited the amount or variation of foods available for the children to purchase, and alerted parents to the concerns and the limited availability of some of the items. Most schools affected were in high-poverty areas, and depended on federally funded lunch programs, such as the Community Eligibility Provision (CEP) a federal grant established by the Healthy, Hunger-Free Kids Act of 2010 and operated through the Department of Agriculture. Some 22 million students in nearly 100,000 schools received school meals through that operation.

=== National parks and capital museums ===
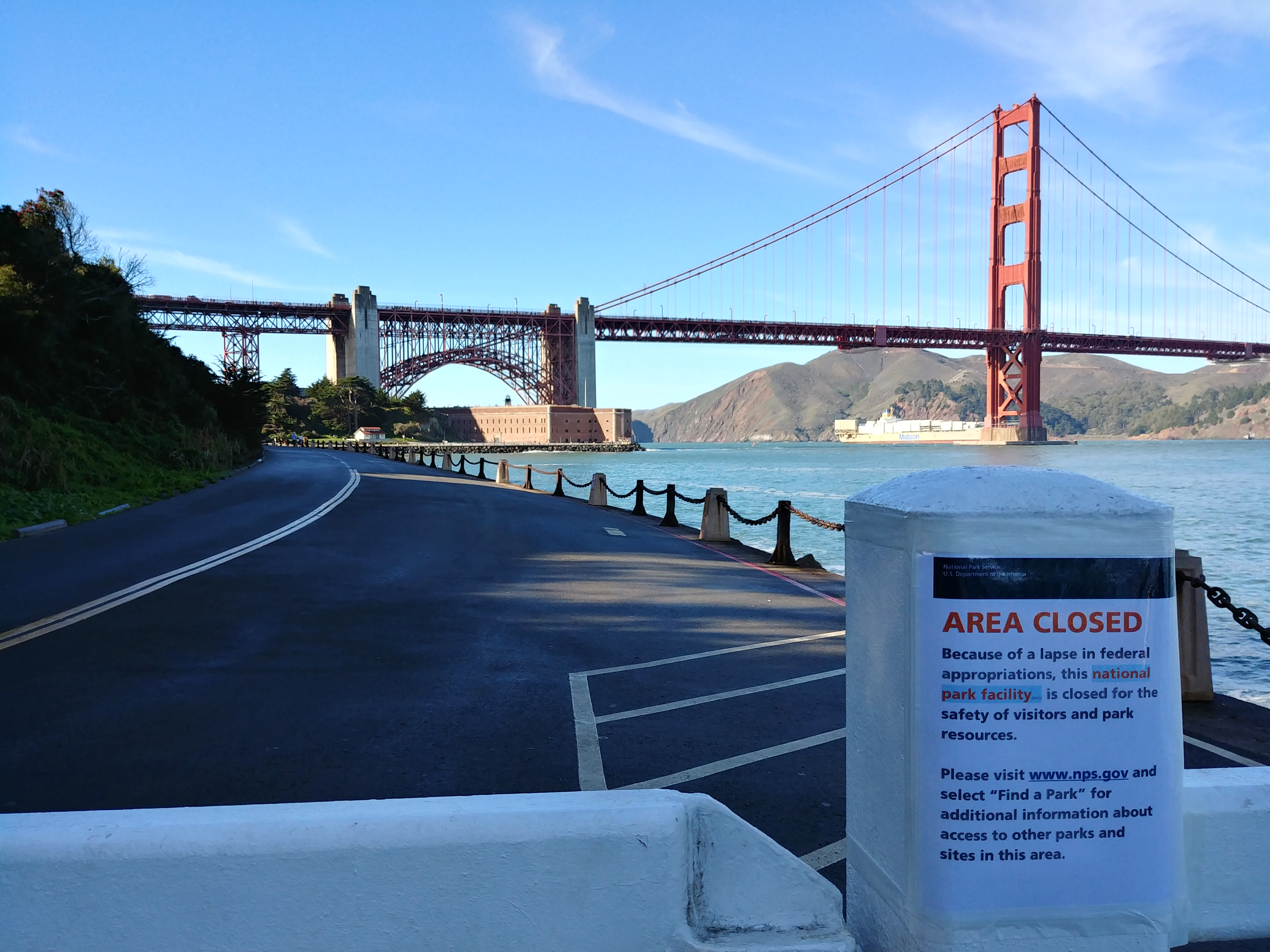
Fort Point, San Francisco under shutdown

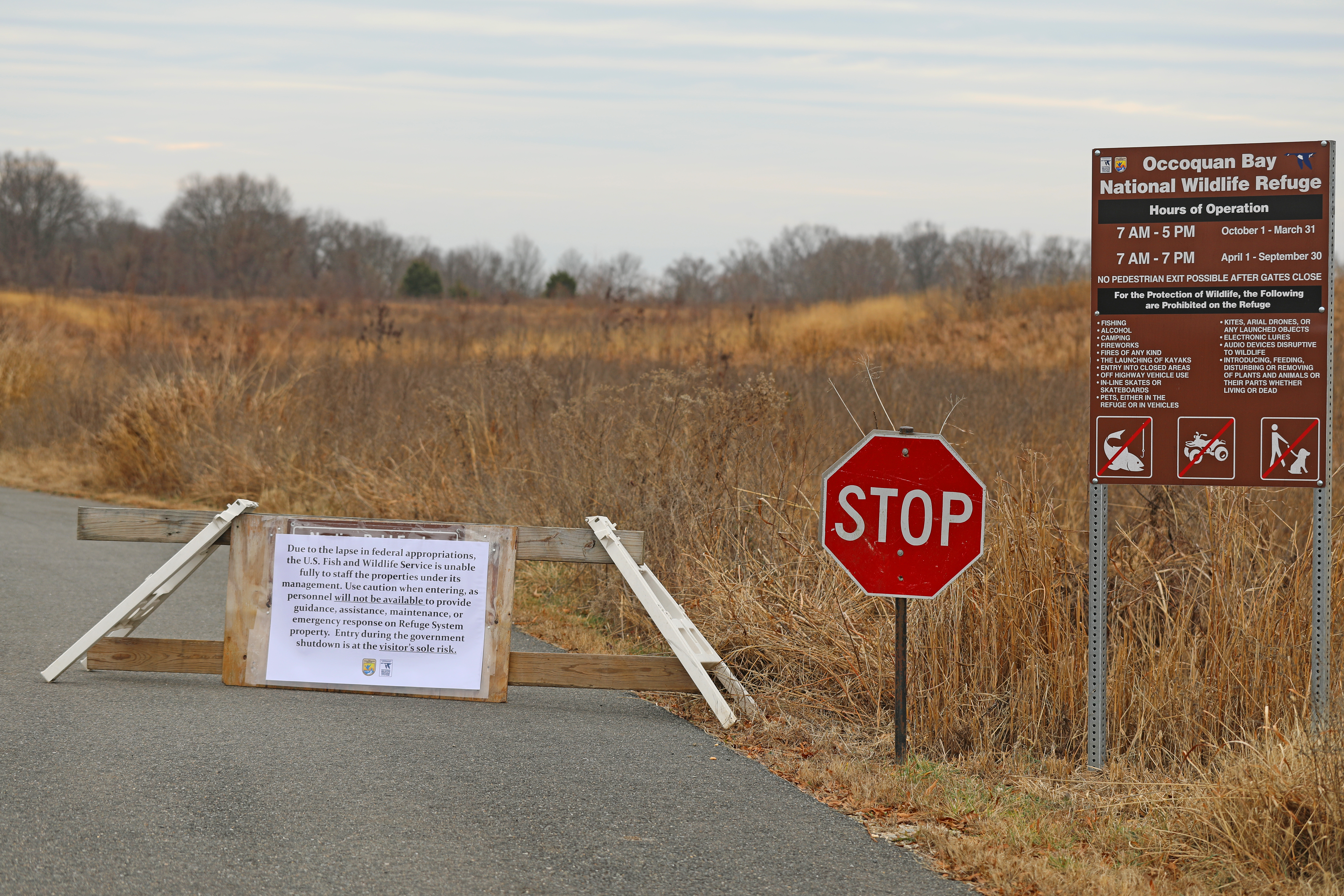
Occoquan Bay National Wildlife Refuge under shutdown on January 3

As with the January 2018 shutdown, national parks were expected to be open to the extent practical, though there would be no staff and buildings would be closed. The shutdown affected national parks unevenly, some were accessible with bare-bones staffing levels, some operated with money from states or charitable groups, and others were locked off. Diane Regas, president and chief executive of the Trust for Public Land, called upon Trump to close all national parks to protect the public: by the third week of the shutdown, three people had died in national parks. This number was reported as being within 'usual' levels. At Yosemite National Park, on January 4, 2019, a death from a fall went unreported for a week.

By January 1, 2019, the problems of neglected trash pileup, overflowing public toilets, and access to first aid were repeated across the Park system. Health and safety concerns were raised, with concerns by scientists that the expansive amount of garbage and human waste could impact water and soil quality, or cause damage to animals in the parks. Other issues that arose due to the shutdown included illegal campsites, protected agriculture being damaged, damaging of government property and trespassing on foot and by vehicle.

==== Closures or limited access ====
New York kept the Statue of Liberty and Ellis Island open, as it did during the January 2018 shutdown. Arizona and Utah were able to keep Grand Canyon National Park, Zion National Park, Arches National Park, and Bryce Canyon National Park open and provided services including public restrooms, shuttles and trash collection. Utah's funding included visitor centers. The sites closed outright in the southwest alone included Bandelier National Monument and Valles Caldera National Preserve in northern New Mexico, White Sands National Monument in southern New Mexico, Petrified Forest National Park in northern Arizona and Casa Grande Ruins National Monument in south-central Arizona. Access to major parts of Sequoia and Kings Canyon parks were closed, and at Joshua Tree National Park, the administration policy of leaving parks open to visitors despite the staff furloughs resulted in park damage, including the toppling of protected trees. In Texas, Big Bend National Park had no visitor services, such as restrooms. Some trailheads were closed. Regulations continued to be enforced, as the park remained open. Visitors were reminded to remove their own trash and toilet paper. The Alamo remained open but no NPS services were available at the San Antonio Missions National Historical Park. Channel Islands National Park remained open to public access, although services normally provided by the national park service were instead provided by Island Packers Cruises, the company normally in charge of ferries to the islands.

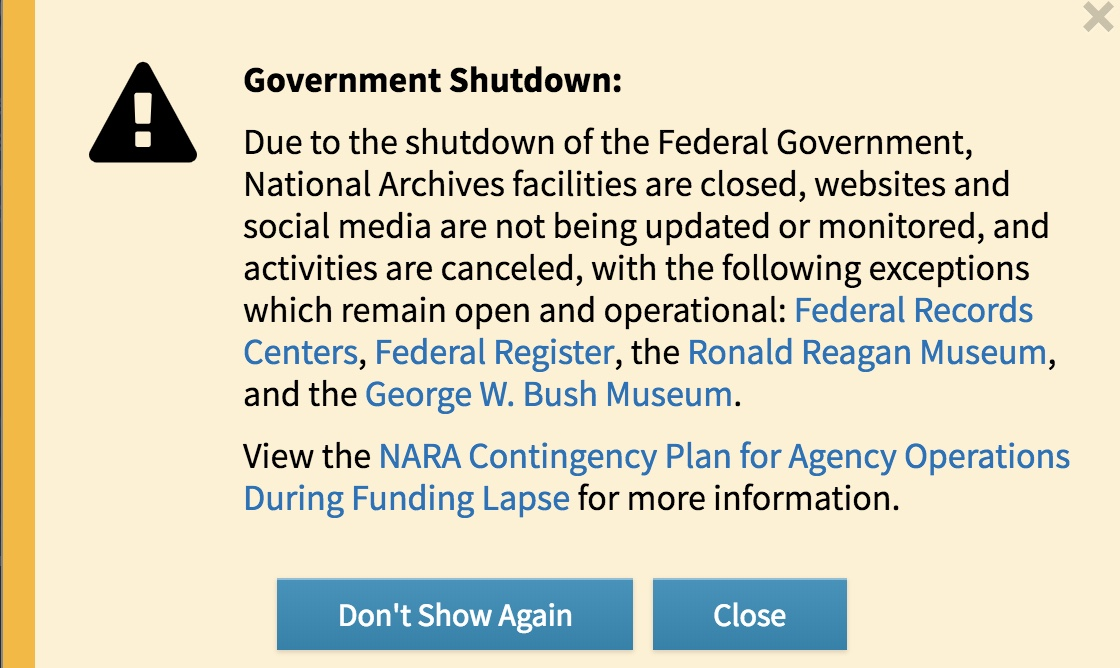
National Archives and Records Administration website shutdown message

The National Archives and Records Administration closed immediately on December 22, 2018. The Library of Congress, the U.S. Botanic Garden, the Capitol Visitor Center, and the U.S. Capitol Building remained open as they were funded by the 2019 Legislative Branch appropriations bill. The Smithsonian Institution operated on "prior-year funds" through January 1, 2019. On January 2, 2019, the Smithsonian Institution initiated an orderly shutdown of all its facilities, including 19 museums in Washington, D.C., and New York City, the National Zoo, and the Smithsonian Conservation Biology Institute. The following day, the National Gallery of Art was closed. The National Zoo also closed on January 3, 2019. Tourism attendance on the National Mall was affected. On January 5, 2019, acting Interior Secretary David Bernhardt directed the diversion of fee revenue defined by the Federal Lands Recreation Enhancement Act to be used to fund minimal maintenance activities so as to preserve access to highly visited parks.

=== Airspace and aviation workers ===
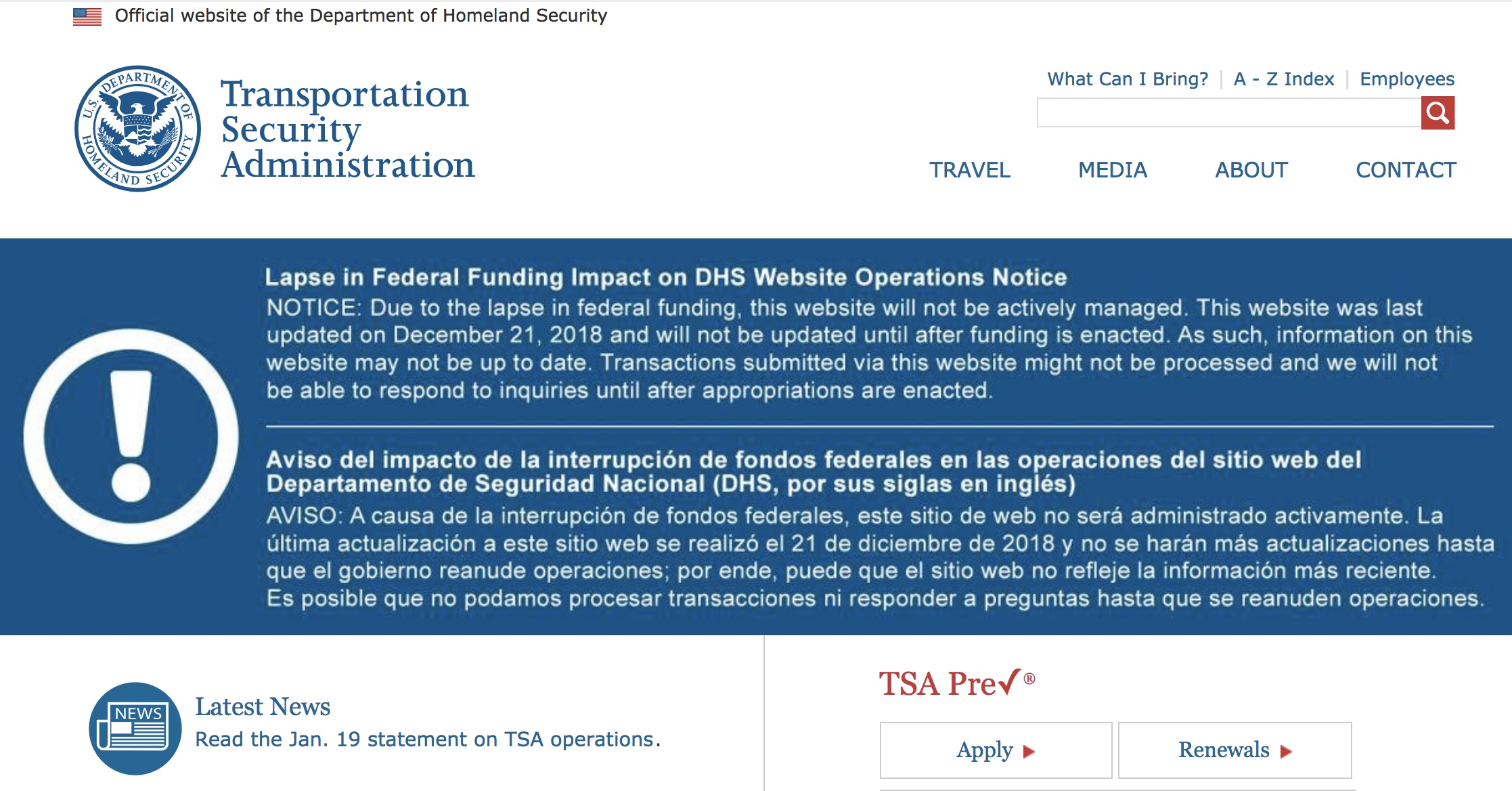
TSA shutdown message as of January 21, 2019

According to a January 12, 2019, article in The Economist, on January 11, the Transportation Security Administration (TSA) was unable to pay its workers who had not been paid since December 22; 55% more of them called in sick than in January 2018.

As the air traffic controllers were deemed essential employees, they were required to work without pay. The National Air Traffic Controllers Association, the union that represents air traffic controllers, filed a lawsuit against the federal government for the shutdown on January 11, 2019, claiming that requiring 16,000 air traffic controllers to work without being paid violated their constitutional rights and federal minimum wage law. That was the third lawsuit filed against the federal government since the beginning of the shutdown.

Airline and aircraft safety inspectors, on the other hand, were deemed nonessential and furloughed. A news report on January 12, 2019, stated that the Federal Aviation Administration had returned 500 furloughed safety inspectors back to work and would return more to work in the following weeks. As the airline and aircraft safety inspectors were furloughed, the certification process of the Airbus A220 in the U.S. was stalled. Delta Air Lines was forced to delay the launch of the new aircraft, and to use other models of aircraft to serve those routes that was supposed to be served with A220. Many TSA employees also called out sick, most of them because they were trying to find other jobs that would provide immediate paychecks.

The shutdown initially prevented the National Transportation Safety Board from assisting the Mexican government's investigation of the 2018 Puebla helicopter crash that killed a state governor and senator; an exception allowed the NTSB to assist with the Mexican government in the investigation along with the Transportation Safety Board of Canada. The NTSB also had to delay several investigations until the government reopened and only continued investigations into accidents that were considered the most serious. Issues in receiving certification and oversight from the FAA led to a month-long delay in the commencement of passenger service at Paine Field in Everett, Washington.

As the shutdown continued into its fourth week, the unions representing airline pilots, flight attendants and air traffic controllers issued a statement asserting, "we cannot even calculate the level of risk currently at play" because of the shutdown.

==== On airports ====
The Philadelphia International Airport launched food and item donations for federal employees who were affected by the shutdown. The Miami International Airport and the George Bush International Airport closed down terminals due to a shortage of TSA workers.

On January 25, flights destined for LaGuardia Airport in New York were halted to a groundstop by FAA officials due to staffing shortages directly as a result of the shutdown. As a result, several flights to and from neighboring airports in the Northeast, specifically Philadelphia and Newark, suffered significant delays of their own. Soon after that, appropriations passed and the government reopened.

The shutdown delayed software updates to the Boeing 737 MAX airplane which may have caused the crash of Ethiopian Airlines Flight 302.

=== Judiciary and law enforcement ===
During the shutdown, court-appointed private lawyers who represent indigent defendants worked without pay. The Federal Judiciary initially had a goal of sustaining paid operations through January 18, 2019. It said it would run out of money to sustain court operations no earlier than January 25, but perhaps as late as February 1. Failing funding, the Judiciary would operate under the terms of the Antideficiency Act. This Act does not allow federal agencies to expend federal funds before an appropriation, nor to accept any voluntary services. The judiciary had 33,000 employees nationwide. Under the Constitution, Supreme Court Justices, appeals court judges and district judges would continue to be paid.

The shutdown caused many delays and disruptions in cases. Budgets were watched carefully to be able to pay public defenders, DNA testing, informants, and travel costs to interview victims and witnesses. Staffing issues also brought about concerns and constraints with prisons lacking the staff to safely hold attorney-client visits, and caused a delay in bail hearings.

==== Investigation and enforcement ====
Video released by the FBI for FBI staff, released on January 25, 2019. Video from Voice of America.

Agents of the Federal Bureau of Investigation (FBI) revealed in a report released on January 22, 2019, by the FBI Agents Association, that several different investigations were compromised by the shutdown. The report was called "Voices from the Field" and was 72 pages long. FBI agents were unable to pay Confidential Human Sources which risks losing that informant permanently. Some FBI divisions no longer have Spanish-speaking staff on hand and could not work with informants who only speak Spanish. Some agents reported that they did not have the funds to assist in joint operations with local law enforcement.

Federal law enforcement agencies working on Native American land worked without pay through the shutdown.

==== Homeland security ====
The Department of Homeland Security (DHS) was forced to cancel a trip to the United States/Mexico border in early January due to the shutdown. DHS was also unable to inspect Immigration Customs Enforcement (ICE) facilities during the shutdown to ensure that immigrants were being held in facilities appropriately. During the shutdown, the federal government's e-Verify system—a system for employers to check the eligibility of their employees to work in the United States—was halted.

During the shutdown, a wave of Domain Name System (DNS) attacks on government sites was detected by Homeland Security. The attacks were serious because these Internet sites could be hijacked.

=== Other agencies ===
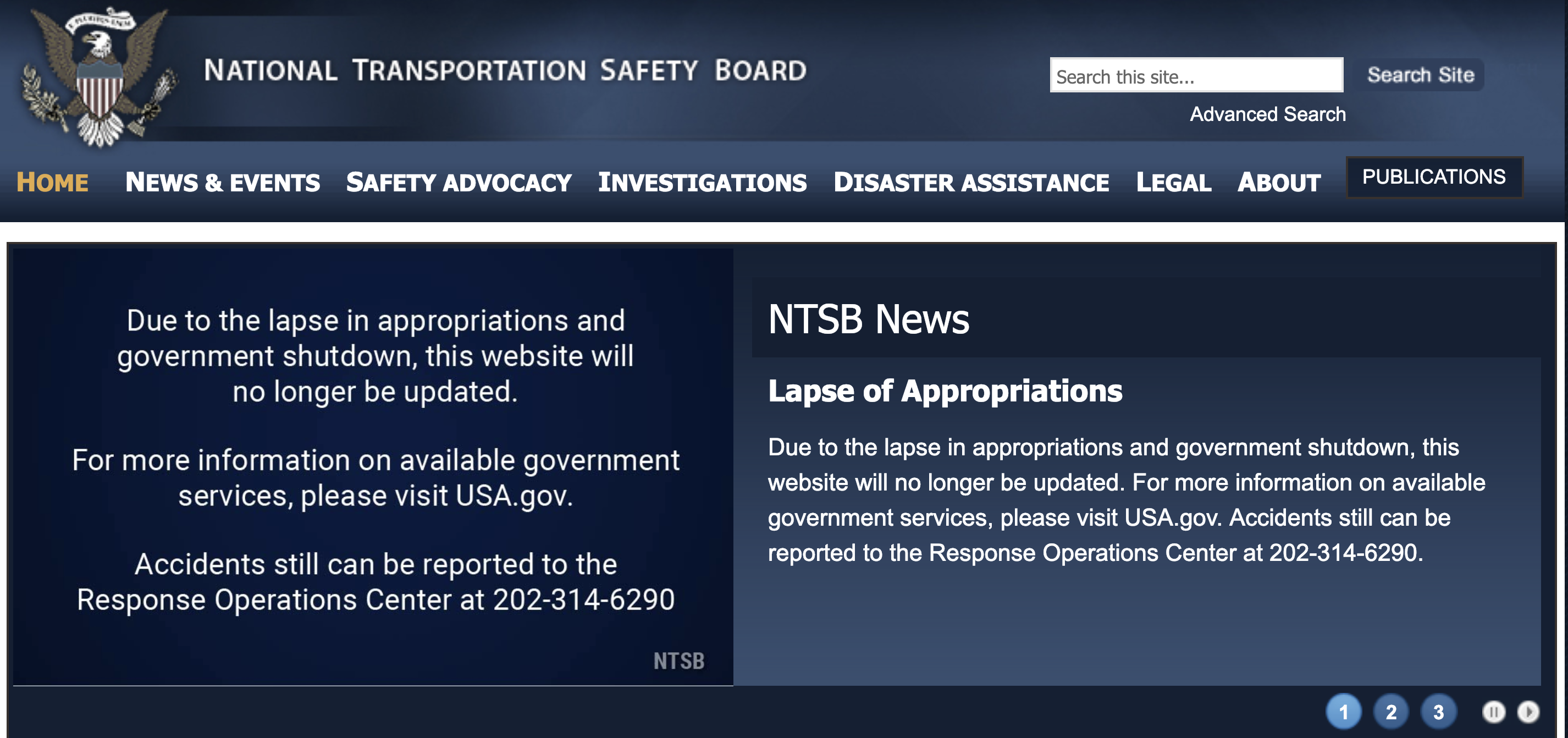
NTSB site shutdown message

Public notice from the FCC published on January 2, 2019, regarding effects of shutdown on FCC operations

Official websites for agencies were rendered insecure or inaccessible through the shutdown, as the expired digital certificates were not renewed. On January 23, DHS asked all government agencies to secure their DNS records; however, many agencies were not able to respond quickly to this request.

Executive and legislative affairs of the local government of the District of Columbia continued operating through the shutdown, due to a provision previously enacted as part of the Consolidated Appropriations Act, 2017. The District's local court system, including the Superior Court of the District of Columbia and the District of Columbia Court of Appeals, are part of the federal judiciary. Thus, they were partially shut down, preventing District residents from accessing services such as marriage licensing. The District of Columbia government said it would take over trash collection and snow plowing operations for National Park Service facilities in Washington.

The shutdown also interfered with the response to the 2018 Sunda Strait tsunami, as the U.S. Embassy in Jakarta's Twitter account was unable to tweet updates, and the United States Geological Survey was unable to provide data on the tsunami. The American weather model, the GFS, suffered a significant drop in forecast quality when a data format change during the shutdown prevented certain weather data from being recognized by the GFS, and the shutdown prevented the bug from being corrected.

By mid-day Thursday, January 3, 2019, the FCC had suspended operations. FCC Chairman Ajit Pai canceled his trip to the Consumer Electronics Show. The FTC also suspended certain online operations. The EPA and Department of Energy's Energy Star website was not available for the duration of the shutdown.

Makers of alcoholic beverages were unable to receive approval from the Alcohol and Tobacco Tax and Trade Bureau for new labels and recipes during the shutdown.

Based on the recalculation of their operating reserves, the U.S. Patent and Trademark Office (USPTO) would have had to cease patent operations in the second week of February. A cadre of personnel was allocated to continue receiving patent applications, receive payments, and maintain the IT infrastructure. Even though the USPTO is self-funded, a Congressional appropriation is required to permit the USPTO to spend money. The pipeline of patent applications at the time took 15.8 months for a response from an examiner.

The Smithsonian Institution shortened to two days and downscaled its scheduled ten-day 2019 Folklife Festival on the National Mall because of the shutdown's effects. Sabrina Motley, the director of the festival, said that initially, crucial funding for the June—July event arrived later than expected, slowing preparations. Motley stated: "The government opened back up, but it took a while for systems to come back online. ... We looked at our production schedule, and it became clear we would need more time than we had."

=== White House ===
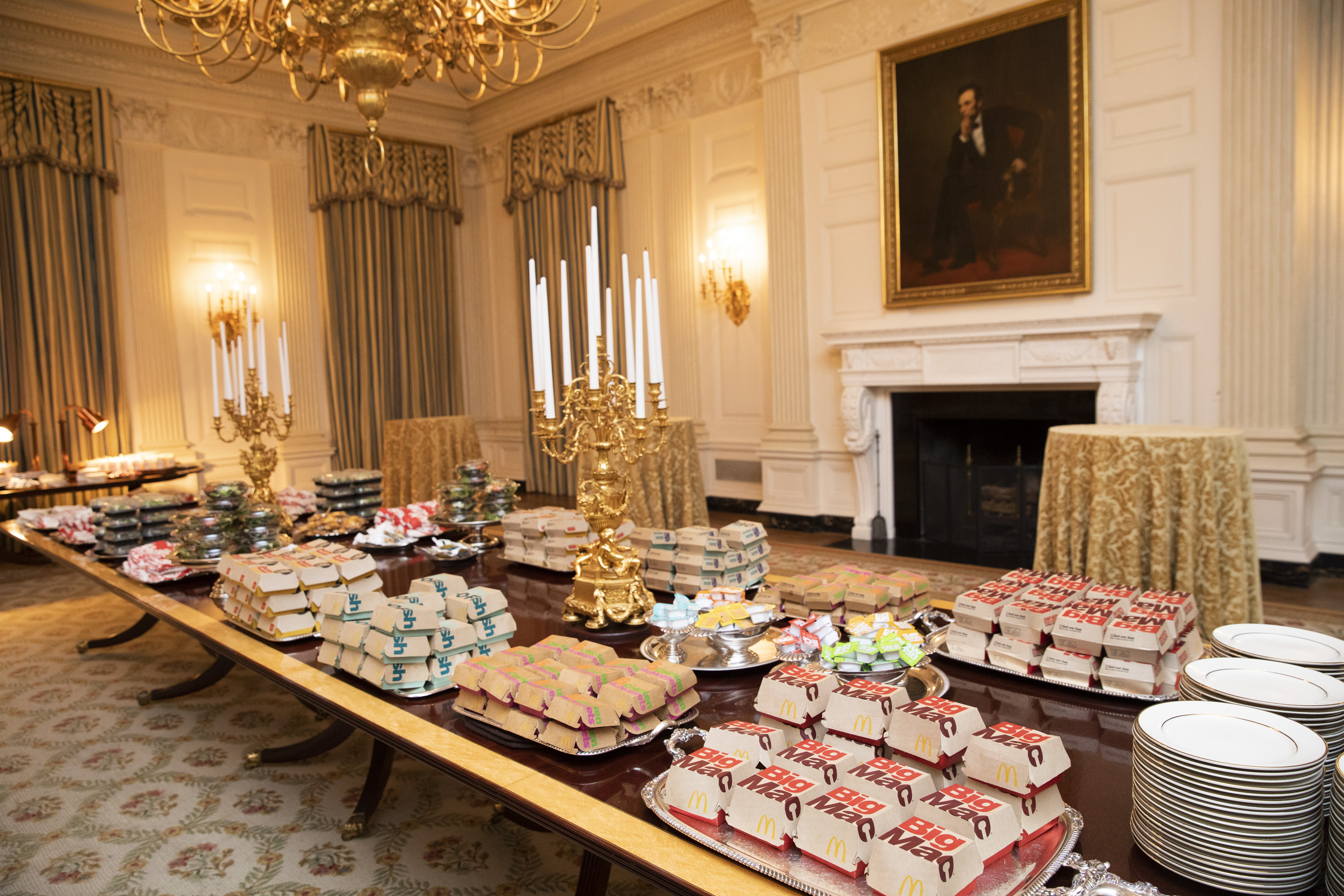
Clemson Tigers dinner spread

The White House residence staff who stage public receptions were among those furloughed, with a minimal staff continuing to work unpaid for the first family. In the midst of the shutdown Trump invited the Clemson Tigers football team to a White House dinner reception on January 14 in recognition of their College Football Playoff National Championship win. On the morning of the reception Trump announced that he intended to serve fast food hamburgers and pizza to the team, a remark that some commentators interpreted as a joke. That evening Trump welcomed the team in the State Dining Room with a buffet of fast food and pizza from McDonald's, Wendy's and other restaurant chains, which he stated that he had paid for personally. Trump served fast food to other visiting athletes later that year, after the shutdown had ended.

== Reactions ==
=== Protests and lawsuits ===
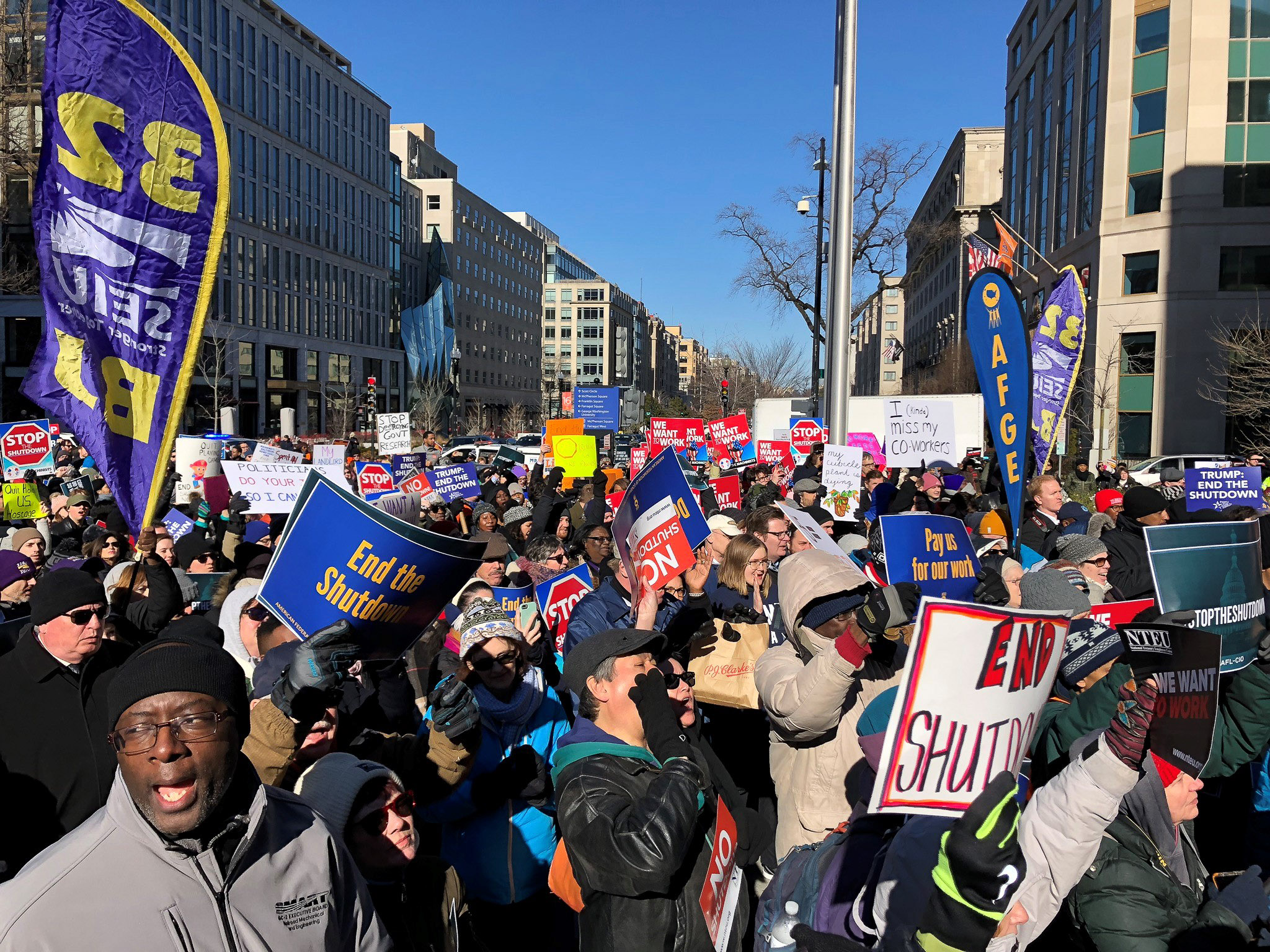
American Federation of Government Employees protest on January 10 in D.C.

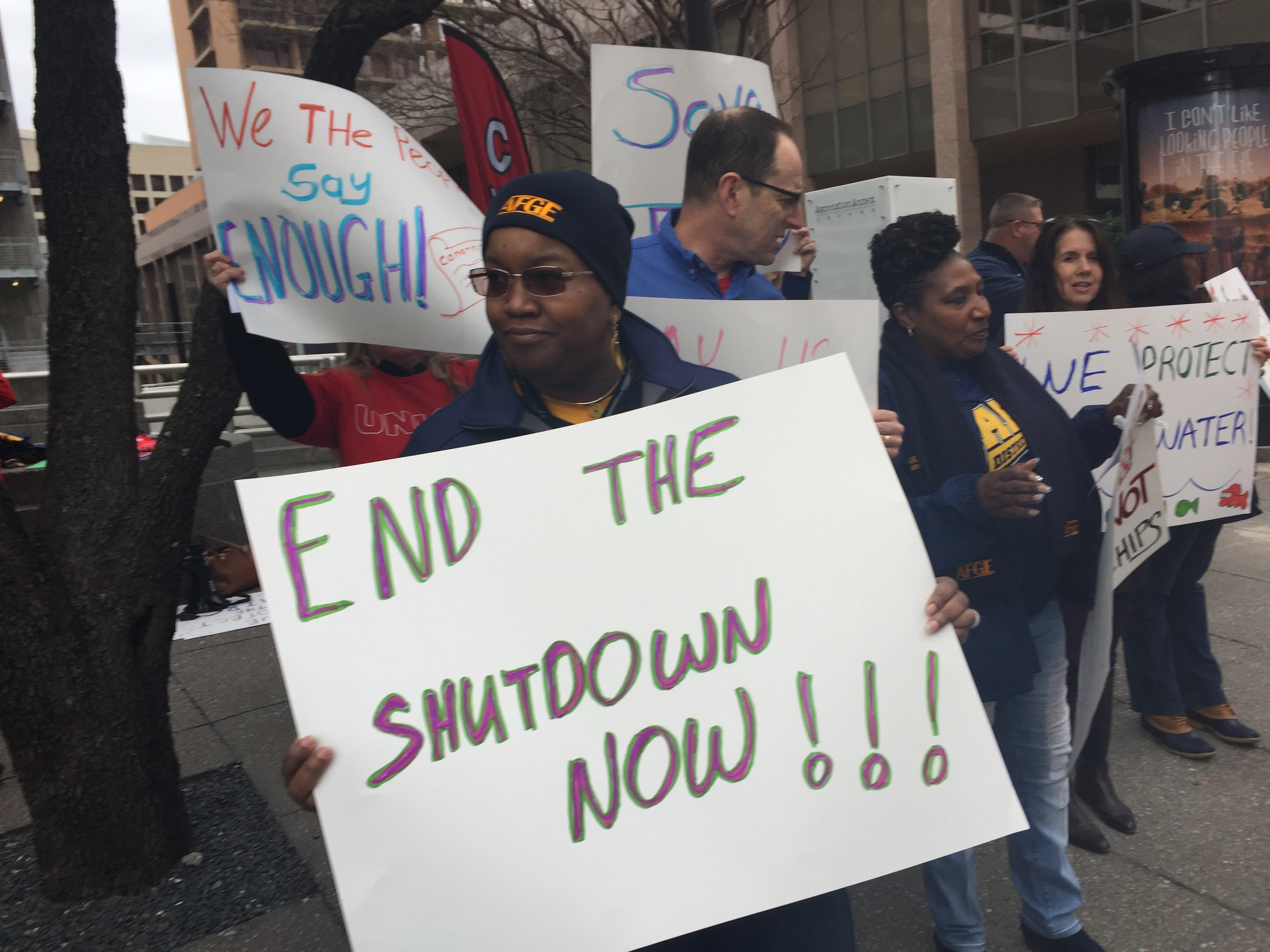
Union members protest in Dallas on January 10

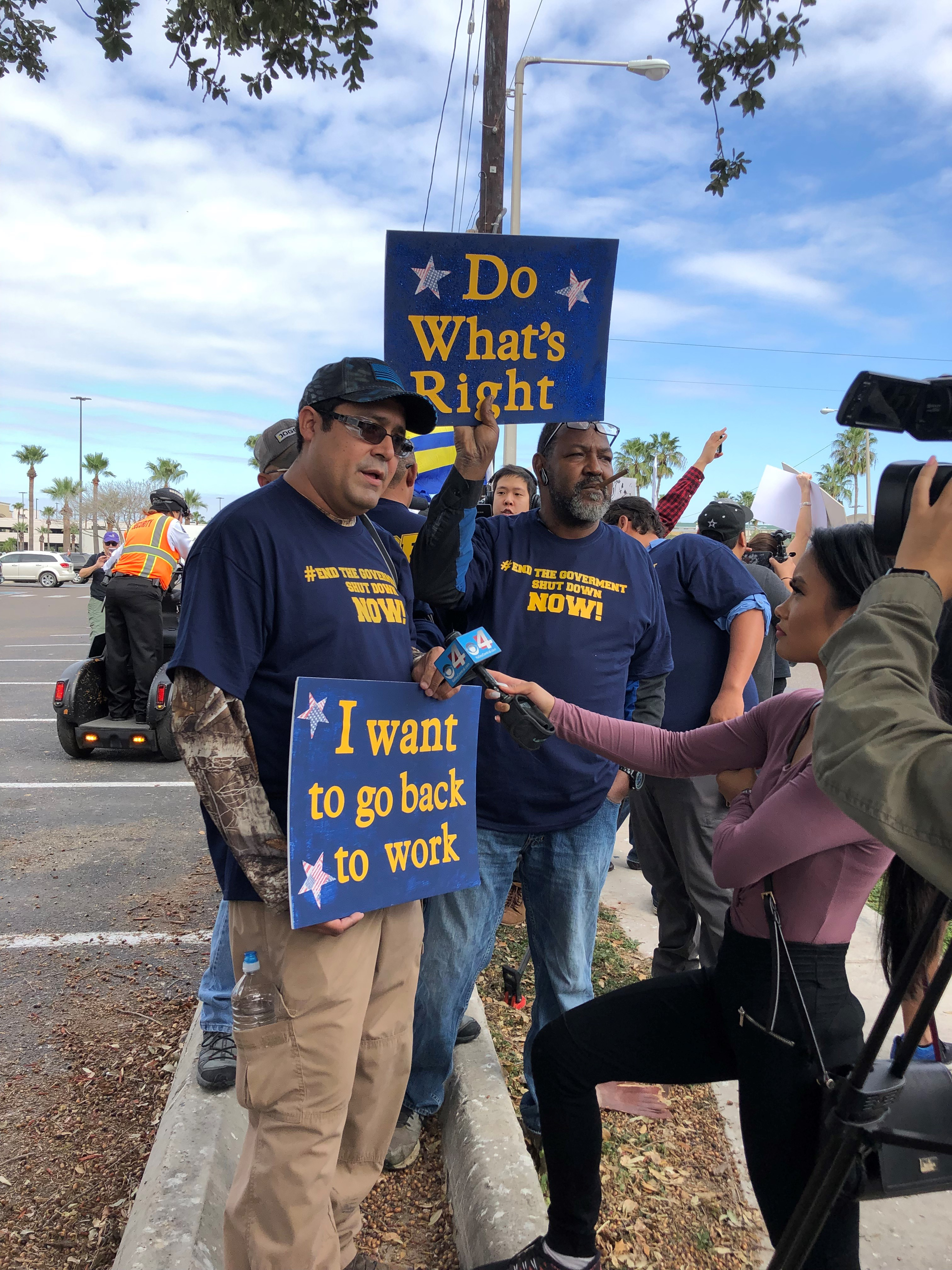
Union members rally in McAllen, Texas, on January 11

On January 10, the American Federation of Government Employees, along with several other unions, announced plans to protest the government shutdown at 1:00pm EST in Washington, DC. Leaders of the National Federation of Federal Employees stated they had hoped that bringing federal workers to the President's doorstep would show him that it was the individual workers that the shutdown was hurting the most. President Trump had left to visit the U.S.–Mexican border in Texas earlier in the day.

Similar protests took place in Philadelphia and St. Louis, among other cities. On January 15, representatives for Veterans of Foreign Wars, Disabled American Veterans, and Vietnam Veterans of America along with others called for an end to shutdown, but avoided placing any blame on political parties.

Shortly after the protests, the American Federation of Government Employees sued the Trump administration to challenge the arrangements for work without pay during the shutdown. A similar suit was raised and won during the 2013 Federal Government shutdown. The National Air Traffic Controllers Association also sued the Trump administration, as the shutdown allegedly violated the Fair Labor Standards Act by failing to pay the workers at least a minimum wage during the shutdown.

=== Members of Congress donating or refusing salary ===
As the salaries for members of Congress are written into permanent law and not funded through annual appropriations, the government shutdown did not affect their salaries. Senators and Representatives were still paid their biweekly salaries of $6,700 towards at least $174,000 a year.

Several Democratic and Republican Senators and Representatives said they would donate or refuse their salary during the shutdown. Texas Congressman Dan Crenshaw stated that he would refuse his salary, Senator Catherine Cortez Masto indicated she would donate hers to a Nevada charity, Senator Mazie Hirono said she would donate her salary to Hawaii food banks, Massachusetts Senator Elizabeth Warren said she would give hers to refugee non-profit HIAS, New York Congressman Max Rose stated that he would give his salary to charity and outgoing Senator Heidi Heitkamp of North Dakota pledged hers to charity, along with her Republican colleague John Hoeven. Republican senator Kevin Cramer, who defeated Heidi Heitkamp in the 2018 midterm elections, refused to donate his salary, calling the move "gimmicky". Representative Brian Fitzpatrick urged all members of Congress to decline their paychecks. He said, "If you're in Congress, don't just delay your pay – forfeit it, write a check back to the US Treasury. Then you'll feel the pain of federal workers."

By January 17, 2019, 102 members of Congress—20 Senators and 82 Representatives—chose to decline their paychecks or were donating their paychecks to charity.

=== Aid for federal employees ===
During the shutdown, many federal workers used food banks and food pantries in order to feed themselves and their families. Many food pantries waived certain restrictions in order to help government workers have access to food. During the shutdown, the Salvation Army Emergency Disasters Services program provided meals for federal workers. Chef Jose Andres created the #ChefsForFeds program to feed federal workers in Washington, D.C. and by January 21, made announcements to expand the program nationwide.

Some states such as California, offered furloughed employees unemployment benefits, although the Trump administration allegedly told states that they could not do so with federal funds. Organizations such as state Attorneys General offices, and credit card companies posted statements to their websites to offer a means to help to consolidate debt, meet mortgages or other payments such as child support or tuition. An employment law firm offered pro bono legal advice to furloughed federal employees. School districts opened up free or reduced lunch options for children of federal employees, and looked into other options to aid parents amid concerns that financial stress at home would adversely affect families and children. Every mainline denomination in America has contributed to efforts to provide relief. One Baptist church emptied its entire disaster fund to aid federal employees.

=== Statements by Trump administration officials and family members ===
On January 24, Secretary of Commerce Wilbur Ross downplayed the financial difficulties faced by the 800,000 federal workers affected by the shutdown, stating that they should borrow money to "tide them over" until the shutdown ends. Critics and Democrats criticized the statement as inappropriate, noting that Ross' own net worth is estimated at almost $700 million, accusing him of being out of touch with the workers. Ross also said that he "did not understand" why people who were not getting paid due to the shutdown were visiting food banks. When asked about Ross' statement, Trump suggested that grocery stores will "work along" with the government by voluntarily extending credit to those who are out of funds to buy food. National Economic Council director Larry Kudlow characterized the shutdown as a "glitch" and suggested that federal workers who were required to work without pay were "volunteering" to work for their love of the country and "presumably their allegiance to President Trump".

In a video message to staff, FBI director Christopher Wray stated, "Making some people stay home when they don’t want to, and making others show up without pay, it’s mind-boggling, it’s shortsighted and it’s unfair. It takes a lot to get me angry, but I’m about as angry as I’ve been in a long, long time."

Lara Trump, a daughter-in-law of the President, drew outrage after an interview in which she stated that while "It's not fair to you..." the shutdown was "...a little bit of pain, but it's going to be for the future of our country, and their children and their grandchildren and generations after them will thank them for their sacrifice right now." Her comments drew criticism by politicians, celebrities, and the general public who felt the advisor and spokeswoman for the Trump 2020 campaign was out of touch, however Lara Trump later claimed the comments were taken out of context.

=== Public opinion ===
In surveys regarding US government shutdowns, Republicans have received more blame than Democrats, though a substantial portion of survey respondents said they were not sure.

In January 2019, a CNN poll conducted by SSRS found that 56% of the responding public opposed a wall while 39% favored it, and 45% viewed the situation at the border as a crisis. The numbers were similar to the poll in December 2018 yet a later poll by ABC News showed that as the partial shutdown entered its fourth week support for building a wall was increasing. A poll done through YouGov between December 23–25, 2018, reported that 51% of respondents thought Trump deserved "a lot" of the blame, 44% thought congressional Democrats and 39% thought congressional Republicans. Similar results were reported by a December 21–25 survey done by Reuters and Ipsos in which 47% of respondents said that the shutdown was the President's fault and 33% blamed Congressional Democrats.

Over the course of the shutdown, Trump's approval rating marginally declined while his disapproval rating marginally increased. His net approval rating was by the middle of January 2019 at its lowest point since February 2018. On December 27, 2018, it was reported that Trump's approval rating of registered voters was at 39%, with 56% disapproval. Broken down the rating was split across party lines, with Republicans reporting an 80% approval rate while Democrats and independents reported a 90% and 57% disapproval rating, respectively. The poll was conducted through Morning Consult between December 21–23. The poll also reported that 43% of respondents blamed Trump for the shutdown, with 31% blaming congressional Democrats and 7% congressional Republicans. Another poll through The New York Times Upshot/Siena College reported that 89% of voters' views on Trump and the wall were aligned, suggesting that support for the wall was a function of support for Trump.

The Washington Post–ABC News poll published on January 13, 2019, found that a larger number of Americans blamed Trump and congressional Republicans than congressional Democrats for the shutdown. A PBS NewsHour–Marist poll found that on January 15, 2019, a majority of Americans thought that President Trump was to blame for the shutdown. A January 2019 poll conducted by telephone for CBS News found that 70% of Americans polled did not want a government shutdown over the issue of building a border wall; 66% believed that Trump should agree to a budget without wall funding.

== See also ==
- First presidency of Donald Trump
- January 2018 United States federal government shutdown
- 2025 United States federal government shutdown - Shutdown during Trump's second presidency
