= National Air Traffic Controllers Association =

American labor union representing air traffic controllers

NATCA
- National Air Traffic Controllers Association
- Founded: 1987
- Headquarters: Washington, D.C.
- Location: United States
- Members: 15,000
- Key people: Nick Daniels, President and Mick Devine, Executive VP
- Affiliations: AFL–CIO, IFATCA
- Website: www.natca.org

The National Air Traffic Controllers Association (NATCA) is a labor union in the United States. It is affiliated with the AFL–CIO, and is the exclusive bargaining representative for air traffic controllers employed by the Federal Aviation Administration (FAA). It also represents a range of workers related to the air traffic control (ATC) industry, and the FAA itself.

NATCA was certified on June 19, 1987 and formed to replace the Professional Air Traffic Controllers Organization (PATCO), which had been decertified following the well known 1981 air-traffic controllers' strike. NATCA promised to never condone an illegal strike but does actively pressure Congress and the FAA to hire more controllers and to accelerate the installation of advanced air traffic control systems. Under the Federal Aviation Reauthorization Act (1996), NATCA's ability to bargain collectively with the FAA for wages and personnel matters was codified.

Internationally, the NATCA is affiliated with the International Federation of Air Traffic Controllers' Associations (IFATCA).

NATCA was involved in contentious negotiations with the FAA in 2005–06 under the Bush administration. When the parties could not reach an agreement on a new contract, the FAA chose to follow the process enacted by Congress and unilaterally implemented new terms and conditions of employment. NATCA filed Unfair Labor Practice charges asserting that the FAA negotiated in bad faith. The General Counsel of the Federal Labor Relations Authority (FLRA), a political appointee, used her prosecutorial discretion to dismiss all charges filed by NATCA. The United States Court of Appeals, District of Columbia Circuit, affirmed her discretion to dismiss the charges.

== Awards ==
In 2004, NATCA established the Archie League Medal of Safety Awards, named after Archie William League, the first air traffic controller.

in 2012, NATCA established the Dale Wright Award named after former NATCA Director of Safety & Technology Dale Wright, for Distinguished, Professional and Exceptional Career Service to NATCA and the National Airspace System.

== Current issues ==
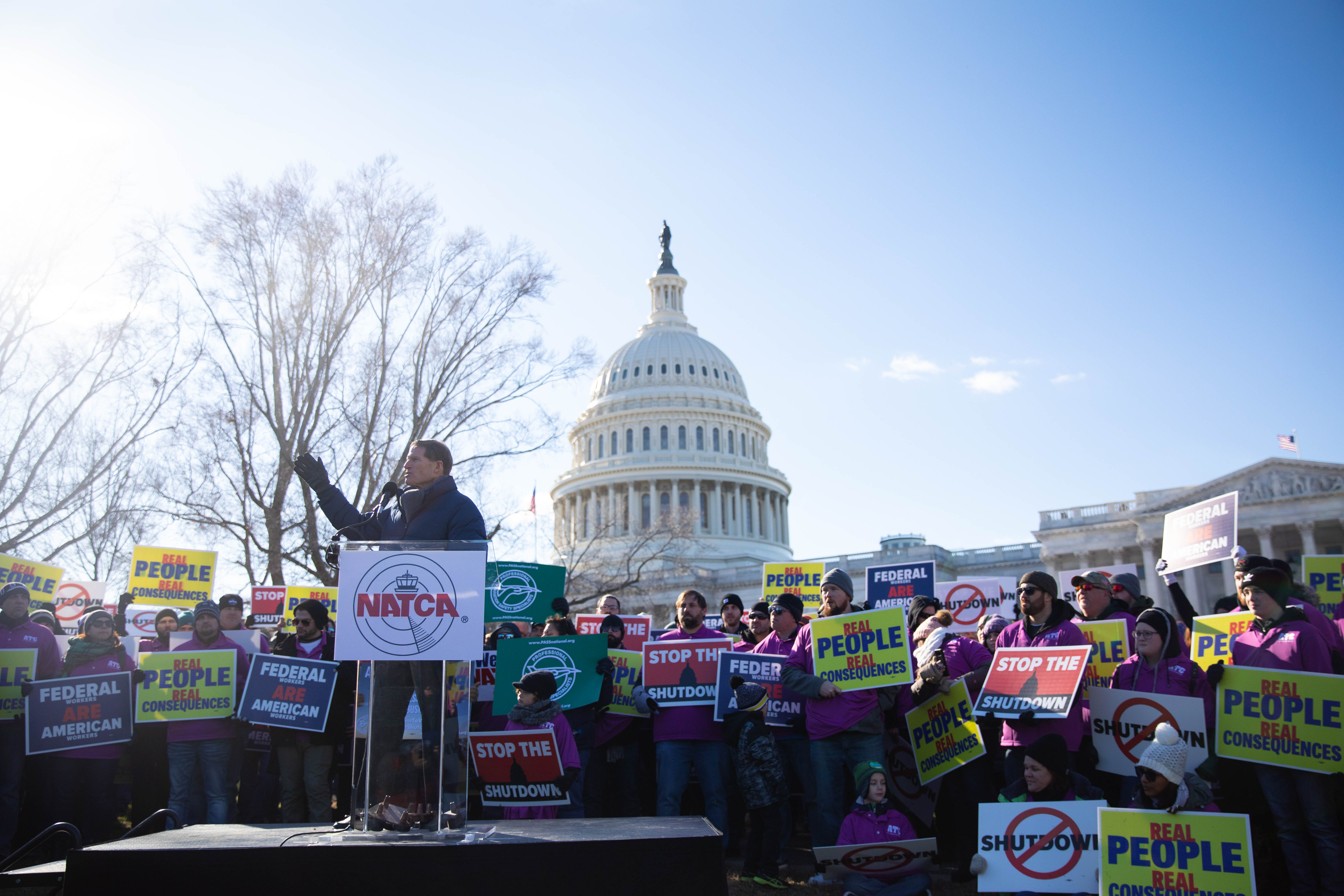
NATCA rally against the 2018–19 United States federal government shutdown

=== FAA Reauthorization Bill ===
On September 3, 2006, the FAA ceased negotiations with NATCA officials and unilaterally imposed terms and conditions of employment on Air Traffic Controllers nationwide. These new terms, which included 30% pay cuts for new controllers and the freezing of current air traffic controllers’ salaries, as well as a sharp change in the working conditions, had a huge impact on the air traffic controllers. Union officials point to these changes to explain the drastic drop in the numbers of veteran air traffic controllers staying past their eligible retirement age, causing an insufficient staffing issue along with a very bottom-heavy, inexperienced demographic structure of the controllers. The originally introduced Reauthorization Bill would have forced the FAA back into negotiations with the NATCA and included a 15-month limit to the bargaining, followed by arbitration if no consensus is reached. The union hopes that these negotiations will help alleviate the staffing insufficiencies, the increasing amount of delays, and help modernize the air traffic control technology.

By the time Reauthorization passed, after 23 short-term extensions, the Parties were already two years into a new three-year contract negotiated in 2009. The new law provides for mediation and binding interest arbitration in the event the parties do not reach agreement in future contract negotiations, ensuring that there are never unilaterally imposed terms and conditions of employment ever again.

=== Staffing crisis ===
As of January 2008, the FAA documented about 11,000 air traffic controllers, which is the lowest number since the 1981 PATCO strike. The union's position is that this staff shortage relates directly to the 2006 imposed FAA regulations. There are even low numbers at busy facilities, such as Atlanta, Chicago, New York, Dallas, and Southern California, which generally offer a larger salary for controllers, The Union feels that this is a very serious safety concern as it keeps facilities understaffed. However, in regards to the FAA's position on the suggested safety issue, Hank Krakowski, then-FAA chief of operations, said "there is nothing that we're seeing at this point in time that gives us any concern." The belief of the FAA is that the staff shortage affects flight delays more than anything else, and even this is not in significant proportions.

In order to maintain or increase the number of air traffic controllers, the FAA is hiring hundreds of trainees and offering cash bonuses to veteran controllers to entice them to stay beyond their retirement date, but numbers remain low. The Union believes that the decreasing proportion of veteran controllers to new controllers will result in the overworking of veteran leaders, incomplete training of many new controllers, and the increased likelihood of a catastrophic mistake.

Both the U.S. Government Accountability Office and the National Transportation Safety Board have released reports signaling to the FAA that there are problems with the low numbers of controllers, scheduling, and controller fatigue, which will affect the overall job performance of the controllers. The U.S. GAO report to congressional headquarters on Aviation and Runway Safety declared that it is not possible to make sufficient headway with the runway safety concerns "until the human factors issues involving fatigue are addressed." The Union believes that the fatigue is the result of the decreased number of air traffic controllers, caused by the FAA's unilaterally enforced policies. They then defer this concern to the National Transportation Safety Board (NTSB), saying, "Air controller fatigue…continues to be a matter of concern for the NTSB."

As it is a safety concern, the NTSB did release a safety recommendation to both the FAA and the NATCA. The issued recommendation analyzed four controller faulted runway "incursions" where, after investigation, the respective air traffic controller showed signs of fatigue. The report said, "Fatigue is known to degrade performance on cognitive tasks involving working memory and vigilance", and that the mistakes made by the controllers in the investigated instances were consistent with signs of fatigue. The board attributed this fact to both the shift-work used at most facilities which often does not allow sufficient rest time between shifts, and to the increase amount of overtime worked due to the decrease in controllers.
