= Air Traffic Controllers Association of Israel =

Israeli professional association

- אגודת פקחי הטיסה בישראל
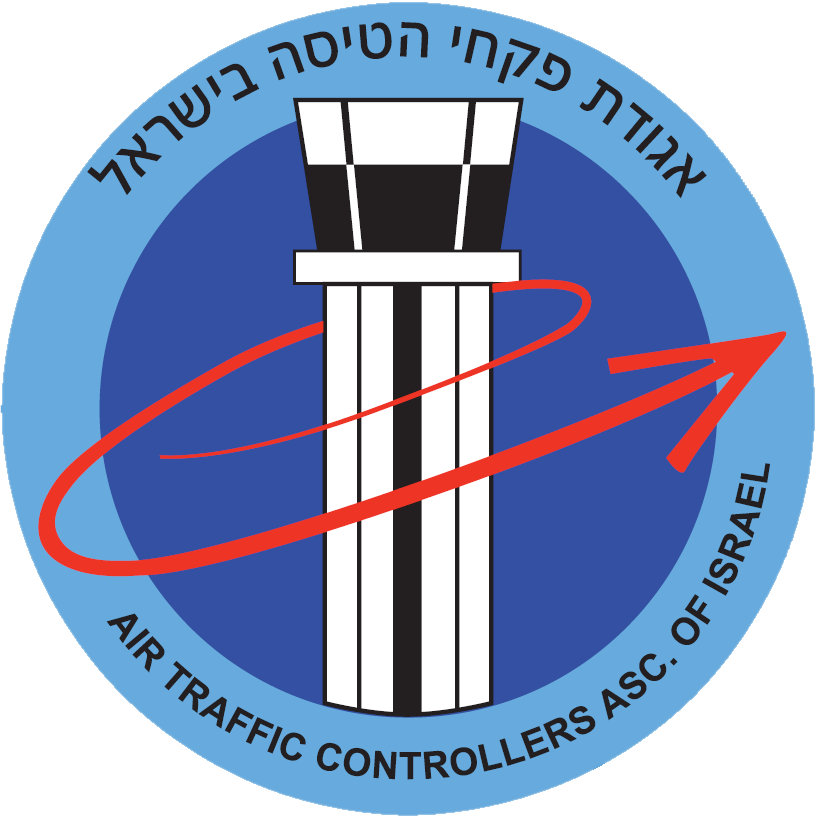
- Abbreviation: ATCAI
- Formation: 1987
- Type: Professional association
- Headquarters: Ben Gurion Airport, Israel
- Members: 250+ active members
- Website: atc.org.il

The Air Traffic Controllers Association of Israel (ATCAI) is a professional association representing civilian air traffic controllers in Israel. The association represents controllers employed by the Israel Airports Authority across the country's control towers and area control centers, and serves as Israel's member association in the International Federation of Air Traffic Controllers' Associations (IFATCA).

== History ==
Israeli air traffic controllers have had organized professional representation since the 1950s. In 1956, Jacob Wachtel, who later served as the first chairman of the Israeli controllers' association, proposed the creation of an international body to represent air traffic controllers globally. This initiative contributed to the eventual founding of IFATCA.

The current association was formally established in 1987, and in 1995 became a full member of IFATCA.

== Media coverage of safety issues ==
Israeli news outlets have reported on a number of instances in which ATCAI raised concerns about aviation safety conditions in Israel.

In 1999, Globes reported that ATCAI had warned that pirate radio stations were causing dangerous interference with communications between controllers and aircraft, and that the association threatened industrial action unless authorities addressed the problem.

In 2002, Globes reported that ATCAI had raised concerns over planned renovation works at Sde Dov Airport, warning that the operational disruptions would compromise flight safety. That same year, Globes credited an individual controller with averting a disaster at Ben Gurion Airport.

In 2007, Haaretz published the contents of an internal ATCAI document alleging that Ben Gurion Airport was failing to meet required safety standards.

In 2011, Ynet reported that ATCAI had raised concerns about safety conditions at Ovda Airport, where civilian and military operations shared a single communications infrastructure. Association representatives stated that a fatal accident was "only a matter of time," and threatened to halt flights to Eilat if the situation was not resolved.

== Recognition ==
Israeli media have reported on several occasions in which controllers were recognized for preventing accidents. In 2001, Globes reported that four controllers received awards for averting air accidents. In 2008, Globes reported on an internal ATCAI document disclosing that controllers had prevented seven near-miss incidents over the preceding year.

== Legislative involvement ==
ATCAI has been invited to provide testimony to the Knesset Economic Affairs Committee on aviation legislation. Association representatives participated in committee hearings on the Aviation Law (2011) and the Aviation Safety Investigation Authority (2023).

== International affiliation ==
ATCAI joined the International Federation of Air Traffic Controllers' Associations as a full member in 1995, connecting Israeli controllers to a global network of over 130 national associations. Through this membership, Israeli controllers participate in IFATCA's annual conference and technical committees, contributing to the development of international air traffic control policy in line with ICAO standards.

== See also ==
- Aviation in Israel
- Israel Airports Authority
- International Federation of Air Traffic Controllers' Associations
