= Dale Wright Award =

Air traffic controllers' career award

- Country: United States
- First award: 2012
- Website: www.natca.org/index.php/media-center/other-natca-awards/dale-wright-award

The Dale Wright Award for Distinguished, Professional and Exceptional Career Service to NATCA and the National Airspace System is an award presented by the National Air Traffic Controllers Association (NATCA) to honor an extraordinary, positive impact made on the organization's ability to call the National Airspace System the world’s safest. It is named after NATCA's former director of safety and technology, Dale Wright. It was first awarded to Dale Wright in 2012.

== List of people who received the Dale Wright Award ==
Year	Name	Video / Photo (external)	Remarks
2012	Dale Wright	www.natca.org	N/A
2012	Mike Hull	www.natca.org	N/A
2013	Ricky Thompson	www.natca.org	N/A
2014	Tom Morin	www.natca.org	N/A
2014	Tim Leonard	www.natca.org	N/A
2014	Don Chapman	www.natca.org	N/A
2016	Kelvin Hale	www.natca.org	N/A
2016	Mike Matherne	www.natca.org	N/A
2017	Steve Abraham	www.natca.org	N/A
2018	Jeff Richards	www.natca.org	N/A
2019	Andy Marosvari	www.natca.org	N/A
2019	Garth Koleszar	www.natca.org	N/A
2019	Julio Henriques	www.natca.org	N/A
2019	Tom Adcock	www.natca.org	N/A
2021	Steve Hartsoe	www.natca.org	N/A
2021	Steve Weidner	www.natca.org	N/A

== See also ==
- List of aviation awards
