= Archie League =

American air traffic controller

Archie William League
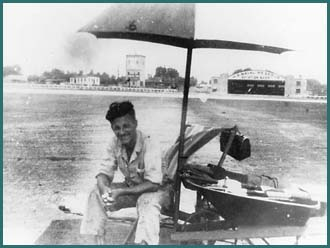
- Archie League is shown while on duty during the summer at Lambert-St. Louis International Airport. His equipment included rolled-up flags in the wheelbarrow, the dangling lunch box, a folding chair, drinking water, and a pad for taking notes.
- Born: August 19, 1907; Poplar Bluff, Missouri
- Died: October 1, 1986 (aged 79); Annandale, Virginia
- Education: Washington University in St. Louis
- Employer: Federal Aviation Administration
- Known for: Generally considered the first air traffic controller.
- Website: Air Traffic Control Begins

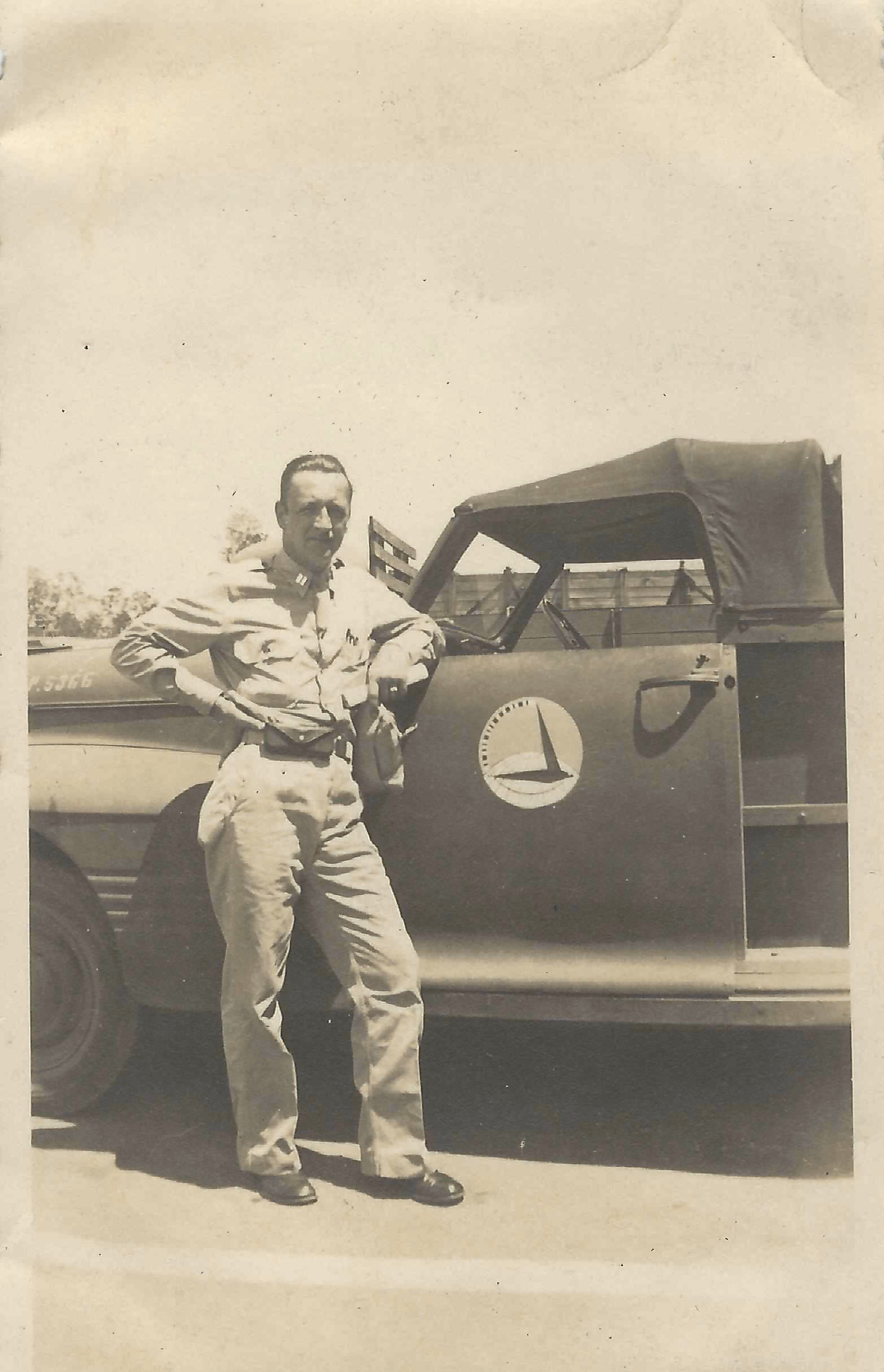
Serving in the Air Force in 1944

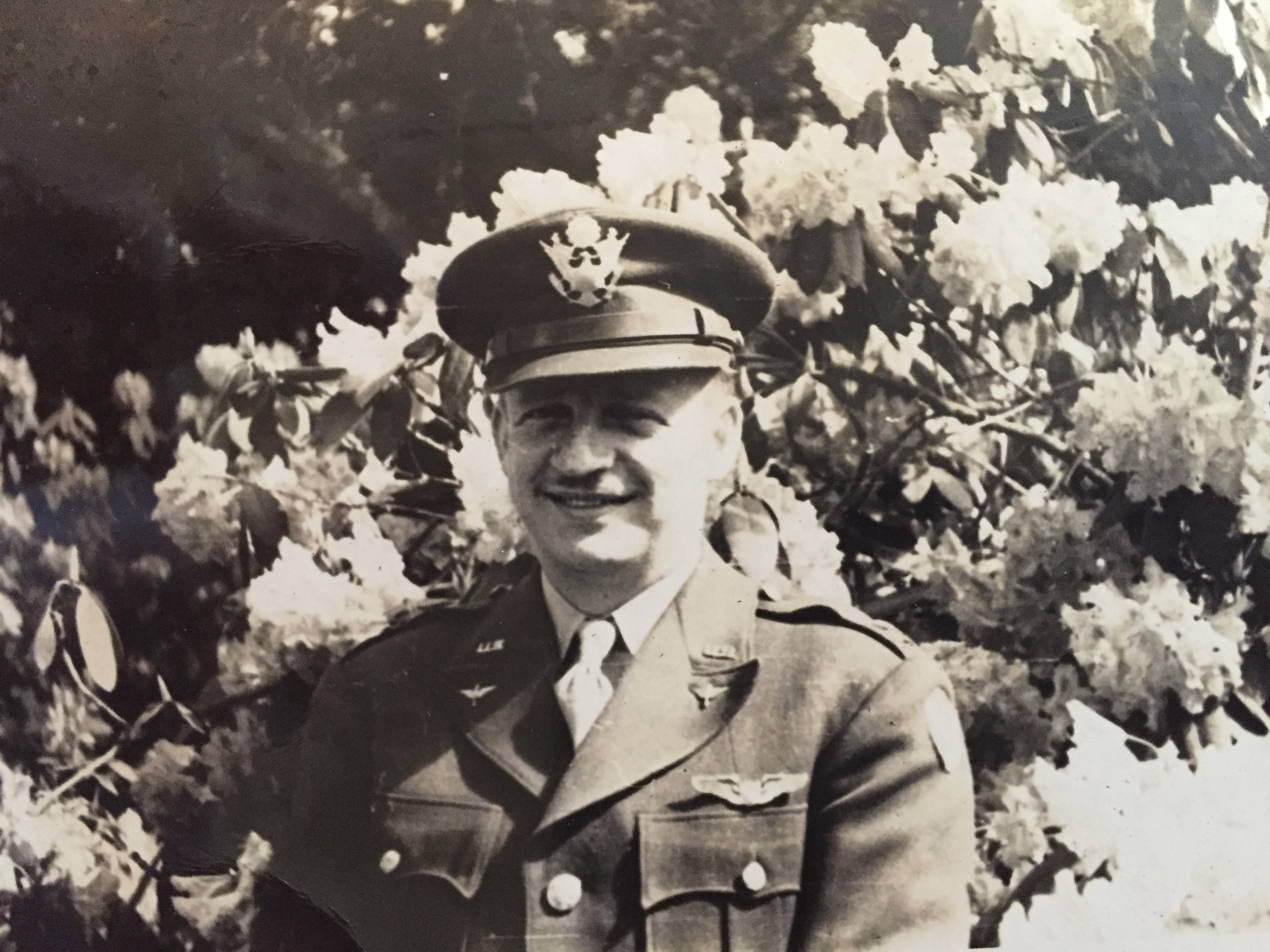
Archie W. League in Air Force Uniform at the Presidio in San Francisco, CA

Archie William League (August 19, 1907 – October 1, 1986) is generally considered the first air traffic controller in the United States. League had been a licensed pilot, and licensed engine and aircraft mechanic. He had barnstormed around in Missouri and Illinois with his "flying circus," prior to St. Louis hiring him as the first U.S. air traffic controller in 1929. He was stationed at the airfield in St. Louis, Missouri (now known as Lambert-St. Louis International Airport). Before the installation of a radio tower, he was a flagman who directed traffic via flags. His first "control tower" consisted of a wheelbarrow on which he mounted a beach umbrella for the summer heat. In it he carried a beach chair, his lunch, water, a notepad and a pair of signal flags to direct the aircraft. He used a checkered flag to indicate to the pilot "GO", i.e. proceed, or a red flag to indicate the pilot should "HOLD" their position. He kept warm out on the field in the winters by wearing a padded flying suit. When a radio tower was installed in the early 1930s, he became the airport's first radio controller.

League went on to earn a degree in aeronautical engineering from the McKelvey School of Engineering at Washington University in St. Louis. League joined the Federal service in 1937 at the Bureau of Air Commerce (the precursor to the Civil Aeronautics Authority, and the Federal Aviation Administration). He rose rapidly through the ranks as an air traffic controller, served as a pilot in World War II (where he rose to the rank of colonel) then progressed to his first top management position in 1956, as Assistant Regional Administrator of the Central Region. He next went to Washington headquarters as Chief of the Planning Division (Planning and Development Office) in 1958. After a short assignment as Director, Bureau of National Capital Airports, he moved to Fort Worth as the Director of Southwest Region. His next assignment was in May 1965, relocating to Washington headquarters as Director of Air Traffic Services, where he became head of the staff responsible for the safe and efficient operation of the nation's air traffic control system. He eventually became FAA's Air Traffic Service director and retired as an Assistant Administrator for Appraisal in 1973. During his 36-year career he helped develop the federal air traffic control system. The National Air Traffic Controllers Association (NATCA) named the Archie League Medal of Safety Awards after him.

He was born in 1907 at Poplar Bluff, Missouri, in Butler County to Achen (Archie) L. League, (little known Klondike adventurer and early radio pioneer) and Itasca Snow League (born Magner). He died on October 1, 1986, at the age of 79 in Annandale, Virginia.

== See also ==
- First Air Traffic Controller Remembered
