= Government Employee Fair Treatment Act of 2019 =

2019 United States appropriations law

- Long title: An Act To provide for the compensation of Federal and other government employees affected by lapses in appropriations.
- Enacted by: the 116th United States Congress
- Effective: January 16, 2019

Citations
- Public law: Pub. L. 116–1 (text) (PDF)
- Statutes at Large: 133 Stat. 3

Codification
- Titles amended: 31 U.S.C.: Money and Finance
- U.S.C. sections amended: 31 U.S.C. § 1341

Legislative history
- Introduced in the Senate as S. 24 by Ben Cardin (D–MD) on January 3, 2019; Passed the Senate on January 10, 2019 (voice vote); Passed the House on January 11, 2019 (411–7); Signed into law by President Donald Trump on January 16, 2019

The Government Employee Fair Treatment Act of 2019 (GEFTA) is a United States federal law which requires retroactive pay and leave accrual for federal employees affected by the furlough as a result of the 2018–19 federal government shutdown and any future lapses in appropriations. The Act is an amendment to the Anti-Deficiency Act, which governs federal procedures during a lapse in annual appropriations.

== Background ==
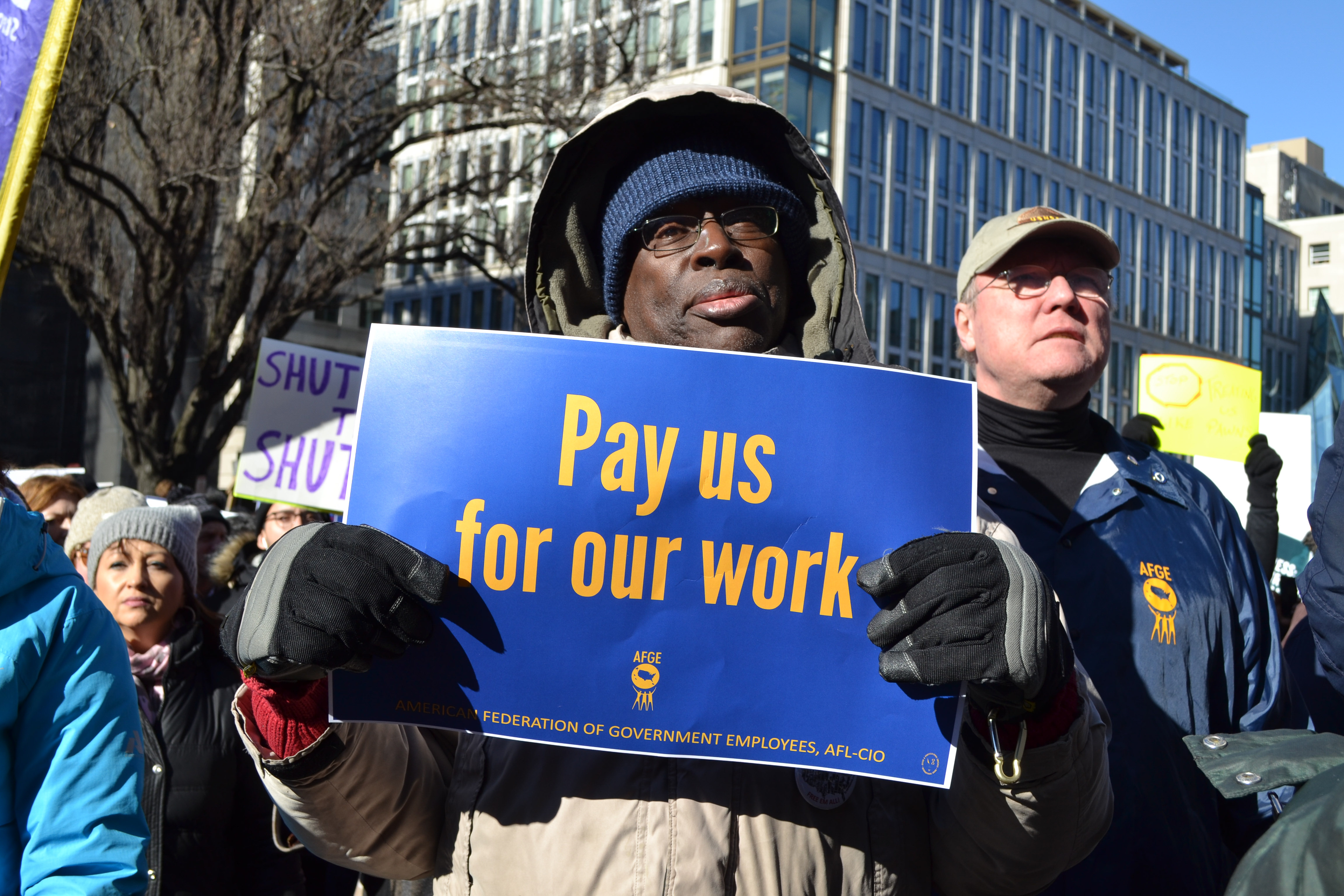
A US government federal employee demonstrates for compensation during the 2018–19 government shutdown.

When a United States federal government shutdown occurs, affected federal employees are considered either "excepted" or "non-excepted". Excepted federal employees must continue to work, generally because their work is considered essential to preservation of life or property. These employees work without receiving pay, and were not permitted to use paid leave, until their agencies are funded, but were already guaranteed their back pay. In addition, other federal employees not affected by the shutdown are considered exempt for various reasons (such as not being funded by annual appropriations) and receive regular pay and benefits.

Prior to 2019, non-excepted employees were furloughed without guarantee of pay unless Congressional action provided compensation for lost wages and accrued leave. In past shutdowns, retroactive pay and leave has always been provided for furloughed employees through legislation passed after that shutdown, even though it was not guaranteed. Typically, the legislative package ending the shutdown included this language; for example, in the January 2018 shutdown, retroactive pay and leave was part of the continuing resolution which funded the government again.

== Legislative history ==
Prior to the start of the US federal government shutdown in December 2018, both the House and Senate had seen bills proposed that would provide back pay for federal employees. However, these were not adopted before the 115th Congress ended its session, and so new versions were required to be reintroduced in 2019.

The Government Employee Fair Treatment Act of 2019 was proposed during the shutdown's third week, and was signed into law within two weeks after that after overwhelming, bipartisan support in Congress. The bill was introduced in the Senate by Senator Ben Cardin as S. 24 on January 3, 2019 with 30 cosponsors. On January 10, 2019, it was passed by the Senate unanimously, in a voice vote. The next day, the House of Representatives held debate on the bill, and then passed the Senate bill without amendment in a roll call vote.

The House vote was 411–7, with 16 non-votes. The small amount of opposition nevertheless received media attention because it was a break from previous back pay votes, such as during the 2013 shutdown, which were unanimous. The 7 opponents of the bill in the House were all fiscal conservatives associated with the House Freedom Caucus, several of whom, such as Representatives Justin Amash and Andy Biggs, argued that the bill's provisions should be limited only to the ongoing shutdown, so as not to incentivize future shutdowns.

On January 16, the bill was signed into law by President Trump, who had already indicated support for it before the Senate vote occurred.

== Provisions ==
The most significant change introduced by the Government Employee Fair Treatment Act was that it applies to "any lapse in appropriations that begins on or after December 22, 2018". This means that in addition to the 2018–19 shutdown, the Act ends the uncertainty employees would have faced about back pay in any future shutdowns.

The Act requires that furloughed employees receive retroactive wages for the length of a shutdown at the standard rate of pay. It also requires that excepted employees working without pay receive retroactive pay for work performed. In addition, the Act grants excepted employees permission to use their paid leave, and to receive standard compensation for leave taken.

It is further specified that this back pay is to be received at the earliest possible date after the end of a shutdown, so that employees would not need to wait until a scheduled pay day.

The provisions of the law cover affected District of Columbia employees, in addition to federal government employees. While D.C. government employees were not furloughed during the 2018–19 shutdown, they had been affected before in past shutdowns.

== Implementation ==
After being signed into law, the Act went into force immediately, applying to the shutdown that began in December 2018, as well as all future shutdowns. On January 23, 2019, the Office of Personnel Management, which oversees US federal human resources policy, issued Compensation Policy Memorandum 2019-04, a memorandum to federal agencies containing details for implementation of the Government Employee Fair Treatment Act.

== Employees vs. contractors ==
In discussing the Act's passage, many commenters noted that it provides relief only to government employees. The many contract workers—especially low-wage, hourly workers—facing financial hardship during a shutdown have traditionally never been awarded compensation for lost wages. Past efforts by Delegate Eleanor Holmes Norton during the 2013 and January 2018 federal shutdowns to pass retroactive pay legislation have not succeeded. In 2019, Norton introduced legislation in the House again which would affect federal contractors, and a similar bill was introduced by Senate Democrats. In contrast to the Government Employee Fair Treatment Act, these efforts have not received widespread Republican support or presidential approval, and have not advanced in Congress.
