= Sabrina Lynn Motley =

Director of the Smithsonian Folklife Festival

- Education: University of California, Los Angeles
- Occupations: festival director; curator; instructor

Sabrina Lynn Motley is the director of the Smithsonian Folklife Festival at the Center for Folklife and Cultural Heritage. She was formerly senior director of programs and exhibitions at Asia Society Texas Center.

== Life ==
Motley studied World Arts & Culture, African studies and anthropology at the University of California, Los Angeles. She previously worked at the Japanese American National Museum, the Vesper Society, Art Center College of Design and Otis Institute for Art and Design.
