= International Federation of Air Traffic Controllers' Associations =

IFATCA
- International Federation of Air Traffic Controllers' Associations
- Headquarters: Montreal, Quebec, Canada
- Members: 50,000
- Website: www.ifatca.org

International Federation of Air Traffic Controllers' Associations (IFATCA) unites the professional associations of air traffic controllers from around the world. In total, it represents over 130 of such organisations, with a combined membership of over 50,000 air traffic controllers.

The Federation is registered in Switzerland, but maintains a permanent office in Montreal, Quebec, Canada.

The goals of the Federation include promoting safety, efficiency, and regularity of international air navigation, aid in the development of air traffic control systems, procedures and facilities and promote knowledge and professional efficiency among air traffic controllers.

They do this by closely cooperating with national and international aviation authorities, and as such are represented in a large number of bodies that are looking at the present and future developments in air traffic control.

Their ultimate goal is a worldwide federation of Air Traffic Controllers’ Associations.

The Federation publishes a quarterly, called "The Controller".
