= Benjamin Sachs =

Benjamin Sachs may refer to:

- Benjamin I. Sachs (born 1971), professor in the field of labor law and labor relations
- Benjamin P. Sachs, American physician
