= Benjamin I. Sachs =

American academic

Benjamin I. Sachs (born 1971) is Kestnbaum Professor of Labor and Industry at Harvard Law School, a chair previously held by Harvard economist James L. Medoff (1947-2012). A member of the Advisory Committee of the Labour Law Research Network, he also serves (with Harvard economist Richard B. Freeman) as a faculty co-chair of the Labor and Worklife Program at Harvard Law School. He is co-founder (with Harvard Law professor Jack Goldsmith) of the blog OnLabor.

A specialist in the field of labor law and labor relations, Sachs teaches classes with a focus on U.S. labor and employment law. His publications in law reviews primarily cover labor organizing as well as the activities and legal status of unions in U.S. politics. His proposal in 2012 for reform of campaign finance rules has stimulated debate on how best to rein in corporate power after the landmark decision in Citizens United v. FEC (2010) by the Supreme Court of the United States. In 2020, Sachs and fellow Harvard Law School Professor Sharon Block launched the Clean Slate Project for Worker Power, which brings together academics and practitioners to develop policy proposals to empower workers and reshape American labor law.

== Career ==
Sachs obtained a BA from Oberlin College in 1993. He then attended Yale Law School, receiving a JD in 1998. After graduation, he became a judicial law clerk during 1998 and 1999 for Stephen Reinhardt of the United States Court of Appeals for the Ninth Circuit.

Sachs worked from 1999 to 2002 as an attorney for Make the Road by Walking, a Brooklyn-based community organization representing working-class neighborhoods in New York City and Long Island. He then took the post of Assistant General Counsel for the Service Employees International Union between 2002 and 2006.

He held the Joseph Goldstein Fellowship as well as lectureship appointments at Yale Law School starting in fall 2005. He joined the Harvard Law School faculty in 2008.

== Academic work ==
Sachs writes about labor issues through the blog OnLabor and op-ed pieces that have appeared in The New York Times, Los Angeles Times, The Washington Post, and Vox, among others. In recent opinion pieces he has argued that U.S. labor law protects N.F.L. players who participate in kneeling protests during the national anthem from employer retaliation. He also called for recognizing “food workers” as a distinct legal category with heightened employment protections to ensure food safety and public health. He has also argued for greater rights for workers to form political unions at the workplace, a kind of organization that could be “unbundled” from the collective bargaining function of traditional unions.

Sachs has been an outspoken critic of ridesharing companies’ employment practices, arguing that rideshare drivers ought to be classified as employees and not independent contractors, who lack similar legal protections. Sachs has written that employee status is not inconsistent with driver work-hour flexibility, as companies Uber and Lyft have often claimed, and ought to be extended to cover a broad array of gig economy workers. Sachs has criticized state-level attempts to exempt ride-hailing drivers from ordinary employment protections in exchange for a more limited set of benefits, such as California's Proposition 22.

In the aftermath of the 2010 decision in Citizens United v. FEC, in which the Supreme Court ruled that corporations have broad rights to spend monies from corporate treasuries on political campaigns, Sachs wrote in the Columbia Law Review that since labor unions face the constraint imposed by the federal government permitting individual members to opt out and ask for a refund of dues used for political spending, corporations should also be compelled to provide an opt-out provision for shareholders who object to political spending from corporate treasuries. In The New York Times (July 13, 2012), Sachs described what he saw as a fundamental injustice in this legal lack of symmetry: “What Citizens United failed to account for.... is that a significant portion of the money that corporations are spending on politics is financed by equity capital provided by public pension funds — capital contributions that the government requires public employees to finance with their paychecks. This consequence of Citizens United is perverse: requiring public employees to finance corporate electoral spending amounts to compelled political speech and association, something the First Amendment flatly forbids.” Sachs's writings about the Citizens United decision has provoked debates among academics and politicians.

In 2020, Sachs and fellow Harvard Law School Professor Sharon Block launched the Clean Slate for Worker Power Project, an initiative of Harvard Law School's Labor and Worklife Program, which seeks to fundamentally reimagine U.S. labor law in ways to empower workers and enhance industrial democracy. In its first report, the project engaged over 70 activists, union leaders, workers, labor law professors, and others in politics and academia to generate ideas and craft a comprehensive policy agenda. Among other major reforms, the Clean Slate Project advocates for minority unionism, sectoral bargaining, mandatory card-check recognition, stronger penalties for labor law violators, and a more limited doctrine of federal labor law preemption. In its second report, the project focused on ways to adapt labor and employment laws in response to workplace challenges stemming from the COVID-19 pandemic. Clean Slate's policy recommendations have garnered considerable attention in both academic and policymaking circles. Writing for The Guardian, American labor journalist Steven Greenhouse argued that Clean Slate's proposals offer “the most effective strategy to combat America's economic inequality and corporations’ sway over the economy and politics.”

In 2021, Sachs and Kate Andrias co-wrote an article in the Yale Law Journal arguing for the creation of new legal tools to promote organizing and collective action among the poor and working class. Drawing from both social science and the experience of the U.S. labor movement, Sachs and Andrias call for the establishment of collective rights and protections to enable debtors, tenants, and other economically marginalized groups to build mass-membership organizations that might collectively bargain for members with relevant private and public actors. In doing so, the authors contend, the proposed reforms would facilitate the growth of genuine social movements to empower the working class.

== Honors ==
In 2013, Harvard Law School gave Sachs the Sacks-Freund Award for Teaching Excellence. Previously he was the Joseph Goldstein Fellow at Yale Law School where he won the Yale Law School teaching award in 2007.

== Selected publications ==
=== Books ===
Sachs, Benjamin I. Reorganizing Work: The Evolution of Work Changes in the Japanese and Swedish Automobile Industries (Garland Publishing 1994).

=== Law review publications ===
Andrias, Kate & Benjamin I. Sachs, "Constructing Countervailing Power: Law and Organizing in an Era of Political Inequality," 130 Yale L.J. 546 (2021).

Lanni, Adriaan, Andrew Manuel Crespo, Benjamin I. Sachs, David J. Barron, Heather K. Gerken, Justice Anthony M. Kennedy, Justice Sonia Sotomayor & Michael C. Dorf, "In Memoriam: Judge Stephen Reinhardt," 131 Harv. L. Rev. 2111 (2018).

Sachs, Benjamin I. "Agency Fees and the First Amendment," 131 Harv. L. Rev. 1046 (2018).

Sachs, Benjamin I. "Law, Organizing, and Status Quo Vulnerability," 96 Tex. L. Rev. 351 (2017).

Sachs, Benjamin I. "Introduction: Labor Scholarship in an Era of Uncertainty," 17 Theoretical Inquiries L. 1 (2016).

Levinson, Daryl & Benjamin I. Sachs, "Political Entrenchment and Public Law," 125 Yale L.J. 400 (2015).

Sachs, Benjamin I. "Privacy as Sphere Autonomy," 88 Bull. Comp. Lab. Rel. 233 (2014).

Fisk, Catherine L. & Benjamin I. Sachs, "Restoring Equity in Right-to-Work Law," 4 U.C. Irvine L. Rev. 857 (2014).

Sachs, Benjamin I. "The Unbundled Union: Politics Without Collective Bargaining," 123 Yale L. J. 100 (2013).

Sachs, Benjamin I. “How Pensions Violate Free Speech,” New York Times, July 13, 2012, p. A23.

Sachs, Benjamin I. "Unions, Corporations, and Political Opt-Out Rights After 'Citizens United'," 112 Columbia Law Review 800 (2012).

Sachs, Benjamin I. "Despite Preemption: Making Labor Law in Cities and States," 124 Harvard Law Review 1153 (2011).

Sachs, Benjamin I. "David E. Feller Memorial Labor Law Lecture: Revitalizing Labor Law," 31 Berkeley Journal of Employment and Labor Law 333 (2011).

Sachs, Benjamin I. "Enabling Employee Choice: A Structural Approach to the Rules of Union Organizing," 123 Harvard Law Review 655 (2010).

Sachs, Benjamin I. "Reinhardt at Work," 120 Yale Law Journal 573 (2010).

Sachs, Benjamin I. "Employment Law as Labor Law," 29 Cardozo Law Review 2685 (2008).

Sachs, Benjamin I. "Labor Law Renewal," 1 Harvard Law & Policy Review 375 (2007).

=== Other publications ===
Sachs, Benjamin I. "Unpreemption: The NLRB's Untapped Power to Authorize State Experimentation," OnLabor (Jan. 11, 2022).

Sachs, Benjamin I. "A Small Point About Cedar Point," OnLabor (June 23, 2021).

Block, Sharon & Benjamin I. Sachs, "Worker Power and Voice in the Pandemic Response" (Clean Slate for Worker Power, Labor & Worklife Program, Harv. L. Sch., June 24, 2020).

Block, Sharon & Benjamin I. Sachs, Clean Slate for Worker Power: Building a Just Economy and Politics (Lab. & Worklife Program, Harv. L. Sch., Jan. 23, 2020).

Block, Sharon & Benjamin I. Sachs, "The Trump Administration is Abandoning McDonald's Workers — and Everyone Else", The Washington Post, Feb. 9, 2018.

Sachs, Benjamin I. & Noah Zatz, "Opinion, The Law is on the NFL Players’ Side," The New York Times, Oct. 17, 2017.

Sachs, Benjamin I. "Benching NFL Players For Protesting During the Anthem Would Be Illegal," VOX (Oct. 15, 2017, 8:36 AM).

Gersen, Jacob E. & Benjamin I. Sachs, "Protect Those Who Protect Our Food," The New York Times, Nov. 13, 2014, at A33.

Sachs, Benjamin I. & Catherine Fisk, "Why Should Unions Negotiate for Workers Who Don't Pay Their Fair Share?," Los Angeles Times, July 9, 2014.
