= NLRB v. Noel Canning =

National Labor Relations Board v. Noel Canning
- Supreme Court of the United States

Argued January 13, 2014 Decided June 26, 2014
- Full case name: National Labor Relations Board, Petitioner v. Noel Canning, et al.
- Docket no.: 12-1281
- Citations: 573 U.S. 513 (more) 134 S. Ct. 2550; 189 L. Ed. 2d 538; 2014 U.S. LEXIS 4500
- Argument: Oral argument
- Opinion announcement: Opinion announcement

Case history
- Prior: 705 F.3d 490 (D.C. Cir. 2013) (affirmed)

Questions presented
- 1. Whether the President's recess-appointment power may be exercised during a recess that occurs within a session of the Senate, or is instead limited to recesses that occur between enumerated sessions of the Senate.; 2. Whether the President's recess-appointment power may be exercised to fill vacancies that exist during a recess, or is instead limited to vacancies that first arose during that recess.; 3. Whether the President's recess-appointment power may be exercised when the Senate is convening every three days in pro forma sessions.

Holding
- 1. The Recess Appointments Clause empowers the President to fill any existing vacancy during any recess—intra-session or inter-session—of sufficient length.; 2. For purposes of the Recess Appointment Clause, the Senate is in session when it says that it is if, under its own rules, it retains the capacity to transact business.

Court membership
- Chief Justice John Roberts Associate Justices Antonin Scalia · Anthony Kennedy; Clarence Thomas · Ruth Bader Ginsburg; Stephen Breyer · Samuel Alito; Sonia Sotomayor · Elena Kagan

Case opinions
- Majority: Breyer, joined by Kennedy, Ginsburg, Sotomayor, and Kagan
- Concurrence: Scalia (in judgment), joined by Roberts, Thomas, and Alito

Laws applied
- U.S. Const., Art. II, §2, cl. 3

National Labor Relations Board v. Noel Canning, 573 U.S. 513 (2014), was a United States Supreme Court case in which the Court unanimously ruled that the president of the United States cannot use their authority under the Recess Appointment Clause of the United States Constitution to appoint public officials unless the United States Senate is in recess and not able to transact Senate business. The Court held that the clause allows the president to make appointments during both intra-session and inter-session recesses but only if the recess is of sufficient length, and if the Senate is actually unavailable for deliberation, thereby limiting future recess appointments. The Court also ruled that any office vacancy can be filled during the recess, regardless of when it arose. The case arose out of President Barack Obama's appointments of Sharon Block, Richard Griffin, and Terence Flynn to the National Labor Relations Board and Richard Cordray as the director of the Consumer Financial Protection Bureau.

== Background ==
In Federalist No. 67, Alexander Hamilton wrote that the appointment power was ordinarily confined jointly to the President and the Senate, but considering it unlikely that the Senate would remain continuously in session, the Constitution allowed the President to make temporary appointments when the Senate is in recess. Since the advent of nearly year-round sessions, the United States Senate no longer has long recesses. That has potentially changed the meaning of the Recess Appointment Clause of the Constitution, which has affected the way the Senate and the President interact.

NLRB v. Noel Canning dealt specifically with Noel Canning, a Pepsi distributor affected by a ruling of the National Labor Relations Board, and it had potential implications on the executive branch's power to appoint officials without Senate approval. The NLRB had found that Noel Canning refused to execute a collective bargaining agreement with a labor union, allegedly in violation of federal law. Noel Canning appealed the board's ruling to the United States Court of Appeals for the District of Columbia Circuit claiming that three of its five members were invalidly appointed, leaving the board without a quorum of lawfully appointed members. (The Court had previously held in New Process Steel, L.P. v. NLRB that the NLRB could not act without a quorum.) The D.C. Circuit vacated the NLRB's orders. In a similar case, the United States Court of Appeals for the Fourth Circuit held that the NLRB could not enforce its orders because of a lack of quorum caused by the ineffectiveness of recess appointments made by President Obama while the Senate was not in recess.

== Opinion ==
Justice Breyer wrote the opinion of the Court, joined by Justices Kennedy, Ginsburg, Sotomayor, and Kagan. Breyer, writing for the Court, stated, "We hold that, for purposes of the Recess Appointments Clause, the Senate is in session when it says it is, provided that, under its own rules, it retains the capacity to transact Senate business."

The first question the opinion addressed was the scope of the phrase "the recess of the Senate" and whether that is limited to the inter-session recess between the two formal annual sessions of a Congress or extends to intra-session recesses (such as the traditional August recess, etc.). The ambiguity of the specific text of the clause made the Court hold that the clause's purpose is broad, allowing the President to ensure the continued functioning of government even when the Senate is away. However, despite finding that "the recess" means both inter-session and intra-session recesses, the Court added that a recess that is not long enough to require the consent of the House of Representatives is not long enough to trigger the Recess Appointment Clause.

Secondly, the Court addressed the phrase "vacancies that may happen during the recess of the Senate" (emphasis added). Thomas Jefferson admitted that the clause is subject to two constructions, and the Court argued that a narrow interpretation risks undermining powers granted by the Constitution. The opinion found that the phrase applies to both vacancies that occur during a recess and those that occur before and continue to exist through a recess.

Finally, the opinion dealt with the calculation of the length of the Senate's recess. During periods of recess, the Senate meets in pro forma sessions to satisfy the requirement that neither house may adjourn for more than three days without the consent of the other house. While the Solicitor General argued that the Senate was not actually in session despite these sessions, the Court found that pro forma sessions count as sessions, not recesses, consistent with the Constitution's delegation of authority to the Senate to determine how it conducts its own business. However, the deference is not absolute: If the Senate is without the capacity to act (if all senators effectively gave up the business of legislating), it remains in recess even if it says it is not.

=== Scalia's concurrence ===
Justice Scalia wrote an opinion concurring in the judgment, joined by Chief Justice Roberts, Thomas, and Alito. While it agreed with the conclusion the Court reached, the concurrence chastises the majority opinion for ensuring "that recess appointments will remain a powerful weapon in the President's arsenal. ... That is unfortunate, because the recess appointment power is an anachronism." Scalia argues that the recess appointment power only applies to vacancies that arise while the Senate is in recess.

== Subsequent developments ==
Senate Majority Leader Harry Reid said that the ruling underscored "the importance of the rules reform Senate Democrats enacted last November". Minority Leader Mitch McConnell agreed with the ruling: "The President made an unprecedented power grab by placing political allies at a powerful federal agency while the Senate was meeting regularly and without even bothering to wait for its advice and consent. A unanimous Supreme Court has rejected this brazen power-grab."

Senator Orrin Hatch, a Republican and former chairman of the Senate Judiciary Committee, said that the Court had "emphatically rejected President Obama’s brazen efforts to circumvent the Constitution, bypass the people’s elected representatives, and govern above the law [and] reaffirmed the Senate's vital advice-and-consent role as a check on executive abuses."
