= Union affiliation by U.S. state =

Diagram of Union affiliation

Percent of workforce belonging to a union in 2017 20+% 15–19.9% 10–14.9% 5–9.9% 0–4.9%

Union affiliation by U.S. state (2025)
Rank	State	Percent union members	Percent change	Union members	Percent represented by unions	Percent change	Represented by unions	Total employed	Right to Work
1	Hawaii	24.8	▼1.7%	145,000	26.0	▼1.5%	152,000	586,000	No
2	New York	21.3	▲0.7%	1,834,000	22.5	▲0.6%	1,943,000	8,624,000	No
3	Alaska	18.1	▲0.4%	57,000	20.7	▲1.2%	65,000	315,000	No
4	Washington	18.0	▲2.0%	632,000	19.4	▲1.1%	681,000	3,512,000	No
5	Rhode Island	16.1	▲1.6%	82,000	15.3	▲2.2%	89,000	509,000	No
6	Connecticut	16.1	▼0.4%	266,000	17.2	▼0.6%	284,000	1,652,000	No
7	Oregon	15.1	▼0.8%	283,000	16.9	▼0.6%	316,000	1,867,000	No
8	California	14.9	▲0.4%	2,489,000	16.7	▲0.4%	2,784,000	16,651,000	No
9	New Jersey	14.7	▼1.5%	612,000	16.1	▼1.3%	670,000	4,158,000	No
10	Massachusetts	14.6	▼0.1%	498,000	15.4	▼0.2%	527,000	3,427,000	No
11	Minnesota	14.1	▼0.1%	386,000	15.8	▲1.0%	431,000	2,731,000	No
12	Illinois	13.1	Steady	758,000	14.0	▼0.2%	812,000	5,778,000	No
13	Vermont	13.1	▼1.2%	38,000	14.8	▼1.0%	43,000	293,000	No
14	Michigan	13.0	▼0.4%	566,000	14.2	▼0.5%	620,000	4,354,000	No
15	Nevada	13.0	▲0.9%	189,000	14.3	▲0.9%	208,000	1,460,000	Yes
16	Maryland	12.7	▲1.3%	346,000	15.0	▲1.6%	406,000	2,711,000	No
17	Maine	11.9	▼1.2%	71,000	14.1	▼1.2%	85,000	601,000	No
18	Pennsylvania	11.7	▼0.8%	620,000	12.4	▼0.7%	665,000	5,679,000	No
19	Ohio	11.6	▼0.5%	605,000	12.8	▼0.5%	666,000	5,196,000	No
20	Montana	11.2	▼0.7%	53,000	12.3	▼0.8%	58,000	471,000	No
21	Delaware	10.4	▲1.9%	47,000	11.5	▲2.6%	52,000	451,000	No
22	Missouri	9.8	▲1.2%	271,000	11.2	▲1.9%	309,000	2,759,000	No
23	District of Columbia	9.2	▼1.4%	34,000	10.7	▼1.0%	39,000	364,000	No
24	New Hampshire	8.9	▼0.3%	60,000	9.9	▼0.7%	67,000	676,000	No
25	Kentucky	8.9	▲0.1%	157,000	10.5	▼0.7%	187,000	1,769,000	Yes
26	West Virginia	8.5	▼0.3%	60,000	9.1	▼0.9%	64,000	703,000	Yes
27	Indiana	8.3	▼0.7%	260,000	9.6	▼0.8%	301,000	3,143,000	Yes
28	Iowa	6.8	▲0.4%	101,000	8.2	▼0.1%	122,000	1,478,000	Yes
29	Nebraska	6.6	▼0.2%	64,000	8.5	▲0.4%	82,000	973,000	Yes
30	Wisconsin	6.4	Steady	173,000	7.5	▲0.6%	201,000	2,691,000	Yes
31	Alabama	6.3	▼0.3%	131,000	7.2	▼0.6%	150,000	2,090,000	Yes
32	Kansas	6.2	▼0.1%	84,000	9.0	▲1.0%	122,000	1,358,000	Yes
33	New Mexico	6.1	▼1.4%	52,000	7.9	▼0.9%	68,000	855,000	No
34	Oklahoma	6.1	▲0.8%	106,000	7.3	▲1.1%	127,000	1,749,000	Yes
35	North Dakota	6.0	▲1.0%	23,000	6.3	▲1.1%	28,000	385,000	Yes
36	Wyoming	6.0	▲0.4%	14,000	7.2	▲0.5%	17,000	240,000	Yes
37	Colorado	5.9	▼1.8%	161,000	6.7	▼1.3%	180,000	2,706,000	No
38	Florida	5.4	▲0.3%	503,000	6.3	▼0.1%	581,000	9,328,000	Yes
39	Virginia	5.4	▲0.2%	204,000	6.4	▲0.7%	244,000	3,797,000	Yes
40	Georgia	5.1	▲1.3%	236,000	6.1	▲1.7%	280,000	4,601,000	Yes
41	Texas	4.9	▲0.4%	673,000	5.8	▲0.4%	793,000	13,731,000	Yes
42	Tennessee	4.8	▲0.1%	145,000	5.7	▲0.1%	176,000	3,057,000	Yes
43	Louisiana	4.4	▲0.5%	79,000	5.5	▲0.5%	99,000	1,795,000	Yes
44	Mississippi	4.2	▼1.0%	47,000	7.3	▼0.6%	81,000	1,111,000	Yes
45	Idaho	4.1	▼0.9%	36,000	5.3	▼0.6%	47,000	875,000	Yes
46	Arizona	4.1	▲0.4%	132,000	4.5	Steady	148,000	3,256,000	Yes
47	Utah	3.8	▲0.1%	61,000	7.8	Steady	125,000	1,608,000	Yes
48	Arkansas	2.8	▼0.7%	36,000	3.5	▼0.9%	44,000	1,250,000	Yes
49	South Carolina	2.7	▲0.1%	63,000	4.1	Steady	96,000	2,324,000	Yes
50	North Carolina	2.5	▲0.1%	113,000	3.1	▼0.2%	140,000	4,547,000	Yes
51	South Dakota	2.3	▼0.4%	10,000	3.1	▼0.6%	13,000	415,000	Yes
—	United States	10.0	▲0.1%	14,665,000	10.0	▲0.1%	16,486,000	146,661,000	N/A

== See also ==
- International comparisons of labor unions
- Labor unions in the United States
- Right-to-work law
