= Immigration policies of American labor unions =

Immigration policies of American labor unions reflects the attitudes and rules labor unions have about immigration to the United States. Labor unions in the United States, since their early beginnings, have held various viewpoints on immigration. There were differences among the labor unions and occasionally opposition to contemporary majority opinions and public policies.

== First half of 20th century ==
In the first half of the 20th century, the majority of labor unions within the American Federation of Labor (AFL) were strongly anti-immigration, looking to curtail immigration, causing the AFL itself to adopt restrictive policies and resolutions. The predominant viewpoint in the AFL in the early 20th century saw the Chinese Exclusion Act of 1882 as a model piece of legislation for restricting Asian immigration and favored its expansion to include Japanese and Korean immigrants. The AFL also favored the passage of a literacy test as a requirement for an immigrant's entry to the United States to reduce the number of unskilled and presumably-uneducated immigrants admitted into the country. After unemployment rose after the conclusion of World War I, the AFL made a renewed push for "a total suspension of immigration for a period of five years or longer." Although the legislation was less severe, the AFL supported the Immigration Act of 1924. While there were several notable exceptions, most labor unions within the AFL were allied with the position of the organization as a whole.

In the early part of the 20th century, restrictive policies towards immigration aligned the AFL with culturally-conservative, nativist groups, such as the American Defense Society. They were functionally one-sided coalitions since the groups by and large ideologically opposed labor unions and workers' rights to collective bargaining.

=== AFL arguments opposing immigration ===
The AFL, in the first half of the 20th century, pursued arguments to promote restricting immigration that were racist, economic, and political. Racist arguments often posited that immigrants were degrading the quality of life in the United States and unable to adapt to American society. Many of their arguments mirrored those of the eugenics movement of the time that certain races were genetically inferior to others and so were incapable of assimilating into the societies of the "higher" races. Generally, various unions within the AFL deemed three immigrant ‘races’ inferior: Southern and Eastern European, Asian, and Latino (often specifically Mexican). However, as Latino immigrants did not make up a significant portion of the population at the time, the AFL focused most vocally on limiting the immigration of the former two groups.

Economic arguments aimed at restrictive immigration policies posited that an increase in the supply of labor tilted the balance toward employers, who could use cheaper immigrant labor as strikebreakers. That would limit the effectiveness of labor unions to bargain, thereby reducing the wages and working conditions of American workers. Also, firms would prefer hiring less expensive foreign workers over American workers, leading to greater unemployment for the latter. Proponents of that argument also opposed organizing immigrants into American labor unions, as doing so would raise their wages, encouraging even more immigration into the country.

With the rise of communism in Europe after the Russian Revolution (1917), and a growing anxiety of similar attempts occurring in the United States, the AFL sought to gain legitimacy by purging itself of any ties to communism. The actions and statements of the far-left Industrial Workers of the World, a labor federation, led to an association between labor and communism, which the AFL fervently sought to avoid. Since immigrants from Eastern and Southern Europe were viewed especially suspiciously as potential communist "agitators," more political arguments were presented by the AFL to oppose immigration from those areas the organization of such immigrant workers.

=== Contingencies of AFL position ===
One central dichotomy that largely dictated the position of labor unions towards immigration during the early 20th century was whether their focus was largely inward or outward. Unions with an outward focus, dedicated to organizing workers, tended to be pro-immigrant, as immigrants constituted the main populations that they were attempting to organize. Unions that attempted to raise wages and working conditions for already-unionized workers, instead of organizing new workers, tended to see immigrant labor as competition with native workers and so wanted restrictive measures. As the vast majority of the unions within the AFL fell in the latter camp in the first half of the 20th century, the AFL, as a whole, unsurprisingly adopted the latter position.

That created a cycle geared towards greater restriction, as it appeared hypocritical if unions within the AFL organized immigrant workers while the organization, as a whole, was promoting policies aimed at restricting immigration. Therefore, the AFL, led by its president, Samuel Gompers, opposed individual unions organizing immigrant labor.

Individual AFL unions that defied central directives and organized immigrant labor were much more likely to oppose restrictive immigration policies, forming a minority within the AFL. One example of such a union was the International Ladies Garment Workers Union (ILGWU), primarily of female immigrant workers from Eastern and Southern Europe, which argued that reducing immigration was the wrong tactic to reduce unemployment and to raise bargaining power.

=== CIO position on immigration ===
Unlike the AFL, the Congress of Industrial Organizations (CIO) did not promote policies to restrict the flow of immigration into the United States. Its members were industrial unions, a more inclusive organizing philosophy to organize both skilled and unskilled workers by industry, regardless of "race, color, creed, or nationality." The AFL, on the other hand, had mostly skilled craft workers, with unions divided by their craft.

The CIO was more supportive towards immigration and more receptive towards welcoming immigrants into their ranks, but the AFL pursued steps to curtail immigration.

== Second half of 20th century ==
During the second half of the 20th century, the predominant view among organized labor changed dramatically, favoring both liberal, inclusive immigration policies and the aggressive organization of immigrant workers. At the end of the 20th century, approximately 2 percent of the world's people resided in a country other than the one in which they were born. Migrant movement across countries has become evident.

=== Increase in illegal immigration ===
The passage of the Immigration and Nationality Act of 1965 created a quota of 120,000 visas per year granted to Western Hemisphere immigrants and restricted Western Hemisphere immigration for the first time. That led to long backlogs of people trying to emigrate from Western Hemisphere countries into the United States. Many residents of those countries decided to instead attempt to enter the United States illegally or to enter legally using temporary work visas and then to remain illegally after their expiration. As illegal immigrants began to be a growing amount of the American labor force, labor unions and federations were forced to differentiate their immigration policies on legal and illegal immigrants.

=== United Farm Workers under Cesar Chavez ===
The United Farm Workers under Cesar Chavez was committed to restricting immigration. Chavez and Dolores Huerta, the cofounder and president of the UFW, fought the Bracero Program, which existed from 1942 to 1964. They opposed the program because they believe that it undermined American workers and exploited the migrant workers. Since the program ensured a constant supply of cheap immigrant labor for growers, immigrants could not protest any infringement of their rights, lest they be fired and replaced. Their efforts contributed to Congress ending the Bracero Program in 1964.

In 1973, the UFW was one of the first labor unions to oppose proposed employer sanctions to prohibit hiring illegal immigrants.

However, on a few occasions, concerns that illegal immigrant labor would undermine UFW strike campaigns led to a number of controversial events, which the UFW describes as against strikebreaking but have also been interpreted as being anti-immigrant. In 1969, Chavez and other members of the UFW marched through the Imperial and Coachella Valleys to the border of Mexico to protest the growers' use of illegal immigrants as strikebreakers. Joining him on the march were Reverend Ralph Abernathy and US Senator Walter Mondale. In its early years, the UFW and Chavez went so far as to report illegal immigrants who served as strikebreaking replacement workers and those who refused to unionize to the Immigration and Naturalization Service.

In 1973, the United Farm Workers set up a "wet line" along the United States-Mexico border to prevent Mexican immigrants from entering the United States illegally and potentially undermining the UFW's unionization efforts. During one such event in which Chavez was not present, some UFW members, under the guidance of Chavez's cousin Manuel, physically attacked strikebreakers after peaceful attempts to persuade them not to cross the border had failed.

In 1979, Chavez used a forum of a U.S. Senate committee hearing to denounce the federal immigration service, which he said the U.S. Immigration and Naturalization Service purportedly refused to arrest illegal Mexican immigrants who Chavez claims are being used to break the union's strike.

=== AFL–CIO opposition to illegal immigration ===
The merger of the AFL and the CIO in 1955 caused the AFL contingent to liberalize its position towards legal immigration, and it no longer advocated restrictive immigration policies for legal immigrants. Various unions within the AFL–CIO differed on their views towards illegal migration, however.

As a whole, during the 1970s the AFL–CIO's policies towards illegal immigrants mirrored the economic arguments made towards legal immigrants during the first half of the century. The AFL–CIO believed that illegal immigrants were willing to work for less money under worse conditions than legal workers and so would drag down the wages of native workers and increase unemployment. They, therefore, pushed for policies aimed at reducing the flow of illegal immigration such as increased enforcement and employer sanctions.

=== Changed attitudes of the AFL–CIO ===
However, by the early 1980s, the AFL–CIO, under Lane Kirkland, began to consider the United States unable to reduce the flow of illegal immigration effectively and that laws to restrict immigration are inherently ineffective. It argued that one central reason is that the disparities between the quality of life in the United States and the countries of origin of most illegal immigrants are so great that many people will attempt to enter the United States regardless of the potential risks.

Two of the most vocal opponents of restrictionist immigration policy towards illegal immigrants were the Service Employees International Union (SEIU) and the Union of Needletrades, Industrial and Textile Employees (UNITE). SEIU, representing principally building trades, state and healthcare workers, grew from 650,000 members in 1980 to over 2 million members in 2009, in large part by organizing immigrant labor, many of whom were working illegally. Justice for Janitors, perhaps the union's most seminal and successful campaign, highlights the union's organization of immigrant labor. UNITE was born of a merger between the ILGWU and the Amalgamated Clothing and Textile Workers Union (ACTWU), both of which have strong histories of opposition to restrictive immigration policies.

The AFL–CIO increasingly believed illegal immigrants to be much harder to organize than legal immigrants, as fear of deportation and lack of legal recourse make them much easier to exploit by employers to prevent the unionization of their workforce. Therefore, believing restricting the flow of illegal immigrants to be impossible, the AFL–CIO began to support policies favoring the legalization of illegal immigrants. One such policy was the Immigration Reform and Control Act of 1986, which granted amnesty to an estimated 3 million illegal aliens.

The AFL–CIO also began to consider restrictions on legal immigration to be ineffective in the early 1980s and that restricting legal immigration does not actually reduce the number of immigrants entering the country but simply creates greater illegal immigration. It, therefore, has supported reforming immigration policy to allow for the entry of more legal immigrants and providing amnesty to illegal immigrants.

== 21st century ==
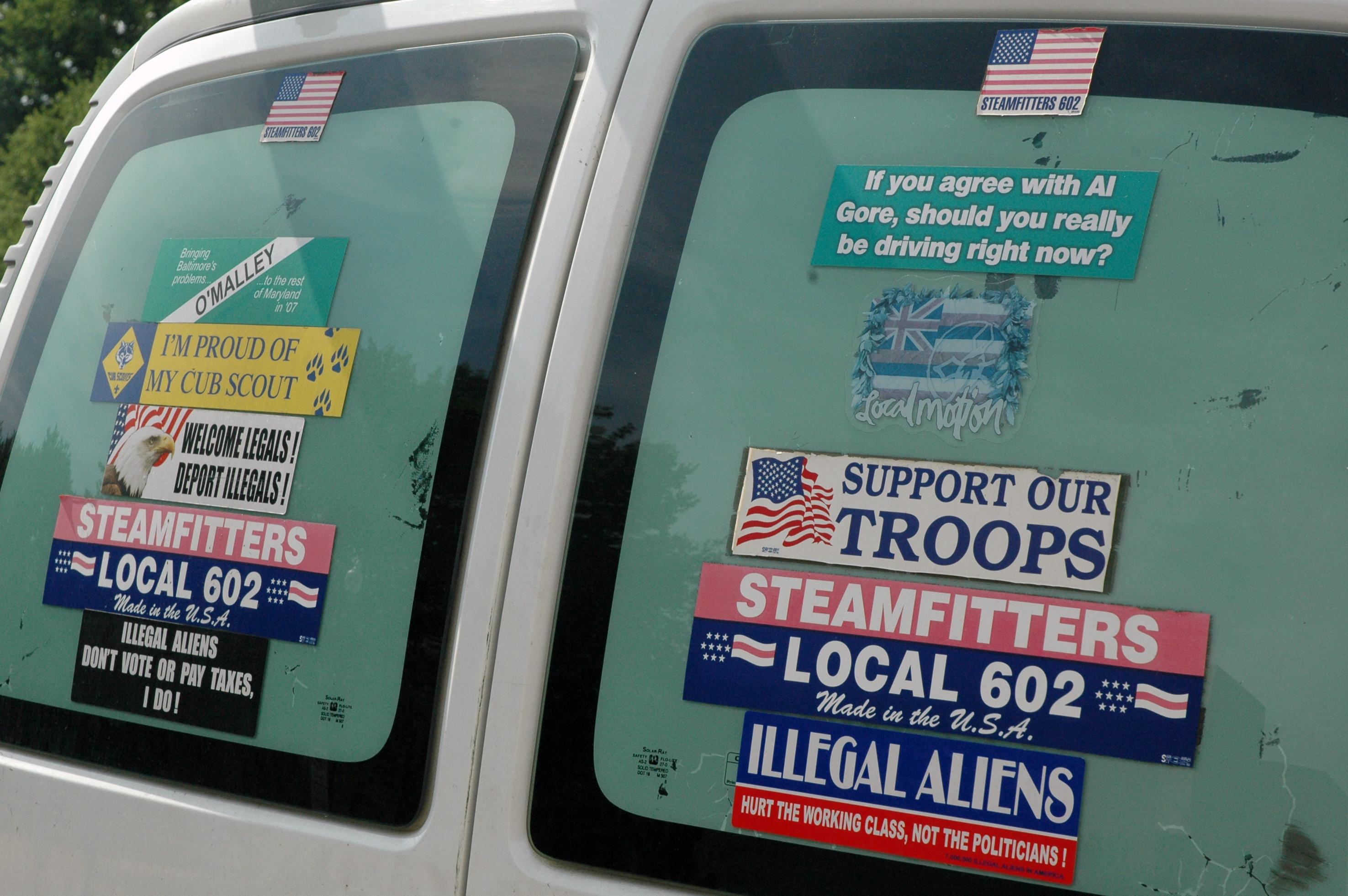
Pro-union and anti-immigration bumper stickers on a car in Washington, D.C. in 2007.

In 2005, several unions within the AFL–CIO, such as UNITE and SEIU, disaffiliated from the AFL-CIO and formed the Change to Win Federation, a competing labor federation that now includes seven constituent member unions.

One principal disagreement the unions had with the AFL–CIO that helped spur their disaffiliation was their belief that the AFL-CIO was not investing enough resources into organizing new workers. While not directly related to immigration issues, the split is reminiscent of earlier disagreements concerning immigration policy in which the AFL unions that had prioritized organization were more likely to support immigration.

In 2007, the Change to Win Coalition and the AFL–CIO on immigration reform proposals, and no legislative changed happened that year. However, on April 14, 2009, both federations released a statement saying that they had agreed on a single reform proposal in response to President Barack Obama's statement that he would press for immigration reform by the end of the year. Their proposal, however, did not include a guest worker program, but the business community has suggested that such a program needs to be a central component of any reform package. Nevertheless, labor's unity on this issue is expected to give Obama additional leverage on the issue.
