= Sharon Block (government official) =

American lawyer

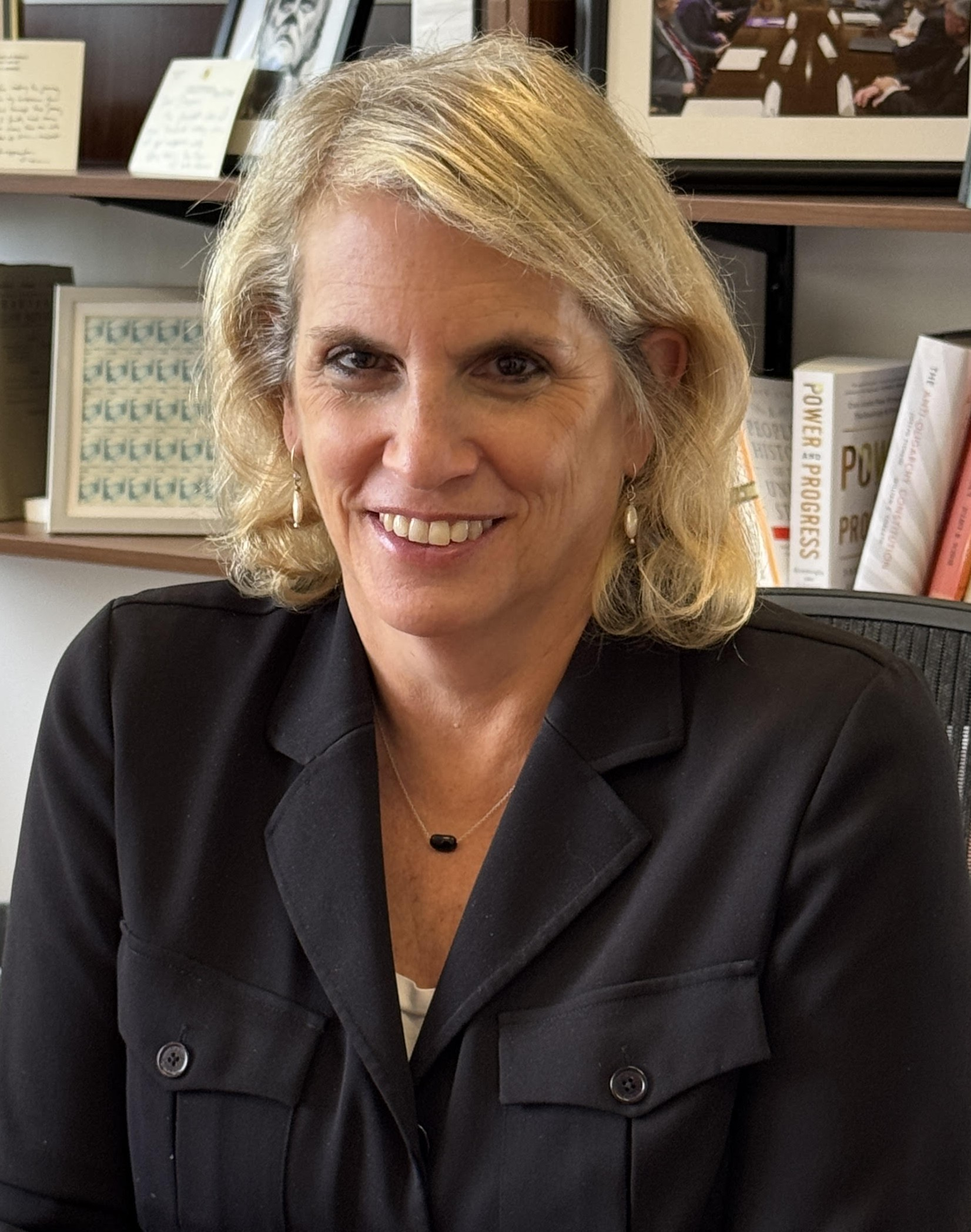

Administrator of the Office of Information and Regulatory Affairs
- Acting
- In office April 22, 2021 – February 1, 2022
- President: Joe Biden
- Preceded by: Dominic Mancini (Acting)
- Succeeded by: Dominic Mancini (Acting)

Member of the National Labor Relations Board
- In office January 9, 2012 – August 1, 2013
- President: Barack Obama
- Preceded by: Craig Becker
- Succeeded by: Nancy Schiffer

Personal details
- Party: Democratic
- Education: Columbia University (BA); Georgetown University (JD)

Sharon Block is an American attorney, former government official, labor policy advisor, and law professor who led the Office of Information and Regulatory Affairs during the Biden administration from January 20, 2021, to February 1, 2022. During the Obama administration, Block served on the National Labor Relations Board and in the United States Department of Labor and the White House. She currently serves as a professor of practice and the executive director of the Center for Labor and a Just Economy at Harvard Law School.

== Early life and education ==
Block received her Bachelor of Arts degree from Columbia University in 1987 and a Juris Doctor from Georgetown University Law Center, where she received the John F. Kennedy Labor Law Award.

== Career ==
From 1991 to 1993, Block was an associate at Steptoe & Johnson. She then served as Assistant General Counsel at the National Endowment for the Humanities from 1994 to 1996. She served as an attorney in the appellate court branch from 1996 to 2003, and a senior attorney for National Labor Relations Board Chairman Robert Battista.

From 2006 to 2009, Block was senior counsel to the Senate HELP Committee under Senator Ted Kennedy. She then served as Deputy Assistant Secretary for Congressional Affairs in the United States Department of Labor from 2009 to 2011.

In 2011, Block was nominated by President Barack Obama to serve on the National Labor Relations Board. She was sworn in as a board member on January 9, 2012, following a recess appointment by the President. However, in 2013, the United States Court of Appeals for the District of Columbia Circuit ruled her appointment as invalid.[6] Block left the board after serving for 18 months in August 2013.

Block returned to the United States Department of Labor and served as Principal Deputy Assistant Secretary for Policy and senior counselor to then United States Secretary of Labor Tom Perez from 2013 to 2017.

In 2014, the Supreme Court of the United States upheld the ruling that President Barack Obama's 2012 recess appointments exceeded his authority and were thus invalid. Obama tapped Block for a reappointment on the National Labor Relations Board, but withdrew her nomination later that year when her nomination was opposed by Senate Republicans.

In 2016, Block was hired by Harvard Law School as Executive Director of the Labor and Worklife Program and joined the program in January 2017. In 2020, Block and fellow Harvard Law Professor Benjamin I. Sachs launched the Clean Slate for Worker Power, an initiative of the school's Labor and Worklife Program that seeks to fundamentally reimagine U.S. labor law in ways to empower workers and enhance industrial democracy. In its first report, the project engaged over 70 activists, union leaders, workers, labor law professors, and others in politics and academia to generate ideas and craft a comprehensive policy agenda. Among other major reforms, Clean Slate advocates for minority unionism, sectoral bargaining, mandatory card-check recognition, stronger penalties for labor law violators, independent labor courts, and a more limited doctrine of federal labor law preemption. In its second report, the project focused on ways to adapt labor and employment laws in response to workplace challenges stemming from the COVID-19 pandemic. Clean Slate's policy recommendations have garnered considerable attention in both academic and political circles. Writing for The Guardian, American labor journalist Steven Greenhouse argued that Clean Slate's proposals offer “the most effective strategy to combat America’s economic inequality and corporations’ sway over the economy and politics.”

Following the 2020 United States presidential election, Block served as a senior advisor on the Biden-Harris presidential transition team through January 2021 and was cited as a potential United States Secretary of Labor for the Biden administration. However, Mayor of Boston Marty Walsh ended up being selected for the position. Block has also been mentioned as a possible appointee to the Supreme Court. In January 2021, she was appointed Associate Administrator of the Office of Information and Regulatory Affairs (OIRA), the number two position in the regulatory agency. In April 2021, she was designated the Agency's Acting Administrator, under the Federal Vacancies Reform Act of 1998.

Block co-edited Inequality and the Labor Market: The Case for More Competition with economist and Treasury Department counselor Benjamin H. Harris in April 2021. The book examines how declining labor market competition contributes to rising income inequality and proposes a number of reforms to labor and antitrust law to address the problem.

Block departed her role in the OIRA on February 1, 2022. On March 15, 2022, Harvard Law School announced that Block would return to the university as a professor of practice and executive director of the Labor and Worklife Program.

== Political views ==
Block is considered to be a political progressive and a supporter of the labor movement. Block is a supporter of legalizing sectoral bargaining, ending at-will employment, works councils in all workplaces, and members-only unions. Block has argued that revitalizing the American labor movement is necessary to save democracy.

== See also ==
- NLRB v. Noel Canning
- Labor and Worklife Program at Harvard Law School
