= International comparisons of trade unions =

Comparative statistics for trade unions

Unions have been compared across countries by growth and decline patterns, by violence levels, and by kinds of political activity.

== Union density ==
The following is a comparison of union density among OECD countries. Note that this is normally lower than the rate of collective bargaining coverage (for example, France reported a union density of 9% in 2014, while collective bargaining covered 98.5% of workers in the same year).

Trade union density in OECD countries
Country	Union density (%)	Year
Australia	13.7	2018
Austria	26.3	2018
Belgium	50.3	2018
Canada	25.9	2018
Chile	17.7	2016
Czech Republic	11.5	2018
Denmark	66.5	2018
Estonia	4.3	2018
Finland	60.3	2018
France	8.8	2018
Germany	16.5	2018
Greece	20.2	2016
Hungary	7.9	2018
Iceland	91.8	2018
Ireland	24.1	2018
Israel	25.0	2017
Italy	34.4	2018
Japan	17.0	2018
South Korea	11.6	2018
Latvia	11.6	2018
Lithuania	7.1	2018
Luxembourg	31.8	2018
Mexico	12.0	2018
Netherlands	16.4	2018
New Zealand	18.8	2018
Norway	49.2	2018
Poland	12.7	2016
Portugal	15.3	2016
Slovak Republic	10.7	2016
Slovenia	20.4	2016
Spain	13.6	2018
Sweden	68.0	2018
Switzerland	14.9	2017
Turkey	9.2	2018
United Kingdom	23.4	2018
United States	10.1	2018

== Union growth and decline ==
In the mid-1950s, 36% of the United States labor force was unionized. At America's union peak in the 1950s, union membership was lower in the United States than in most comparable countries. By 1989, that figure had dropped to about 16%, the lowest percentage of any developed democracy, except France. Union membership for other developed democracies, in 1986/87 were:

- 95% in Sweden and Denmark.
- 85% in Finland
- Over 60% in Norway and Austria
- Over 50% in Australia, Ireland and the United Kingdom.
- Over 40% in Italy.
- Over 30% in West Germany.

In 1987, United States unionization was 37 points below the average of seventeen countries surveyed, down from 17 points below average in 1970. Between 1970 and 1987, union membership declined in only three other countries: Austria, by 3%, Japan, by 7%, and the Netherlands, by 4%. In the United States, union membership had declined by 14%.

In 2008, 12.4% of U.S. wage and salary workers were union members. 36.8% of public sector workers were union members, but only 7.6% of workers in private sector industries were. The most unionized sectors of the economy have had the greatest decline in union membership. From 1953 to the late 1980s membership in construction fell from 84% to 22%, manufacturing from 42% to 25%, mining from 65% to 15%, and transportation from 80% to 37%.

From 1971 to the late 1980s, there was a 10% drop in union membership in the U.S. public sector and a 42% drop in union membership in the U.S. private sector. For comparison, there was no drop in union membership in the private sector in Sweden. In other countries drops included:

- 2% in Canada,
- 3% in Norway,
- 6% in West Germany,
- 7% in Switzerland,
- 9% in Austria,
- 14% in the United Kingdom,
- 15% in Italy.

== Europe ==
=== France ===
==== CGT ====
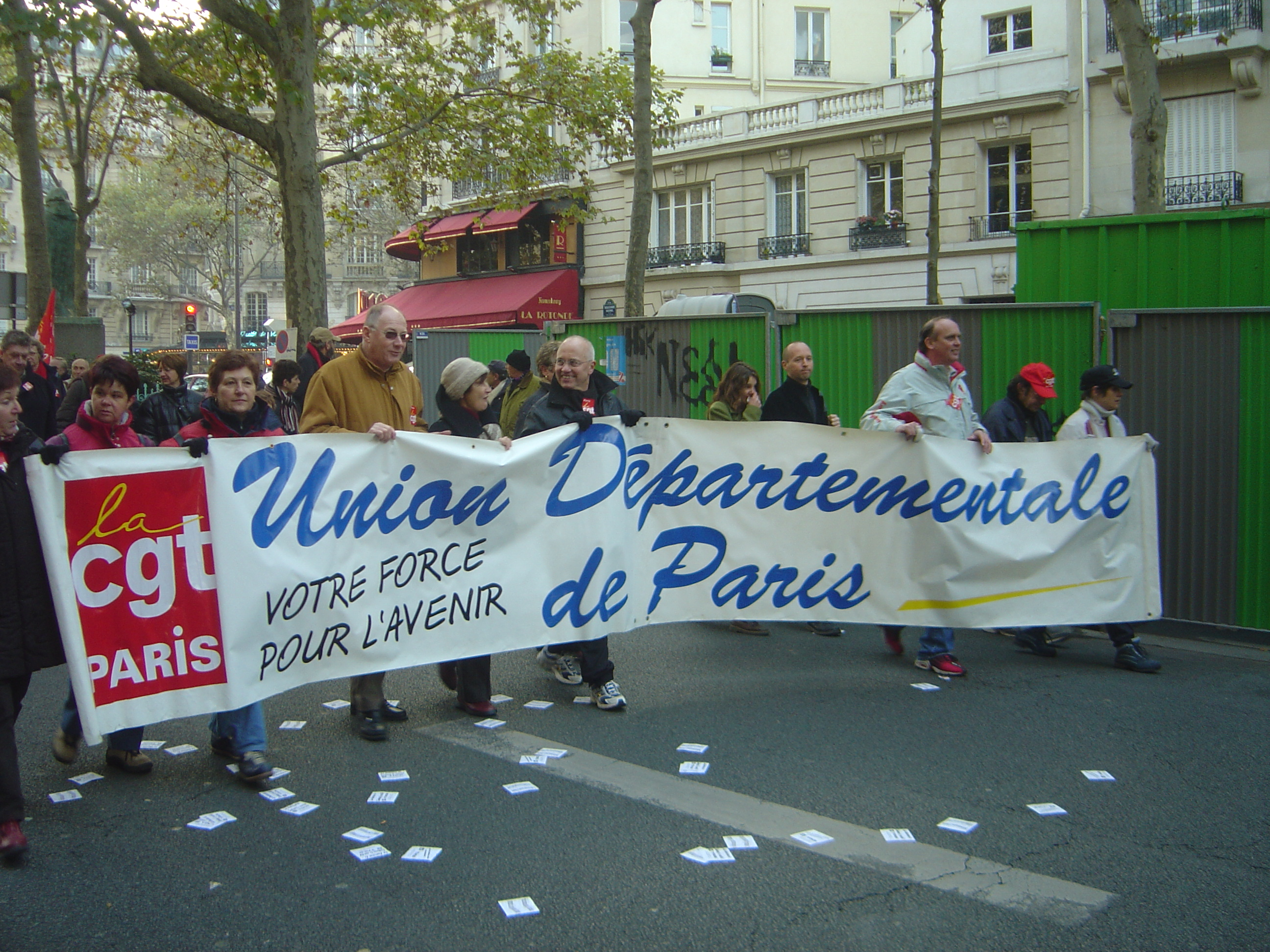
A CGT banner during a 2005 demonstration in Paris

The General Confederation of Labour (CGT) is a national trade union center, the first of the five major French confederations of trade unions. Until the 1990s it was closely linked to the French Communist Party (PCF).

It is the largest in terms of votes (32.1% at the 2002 professional election, 34.0% in the 2008 election), and second largest in terms of membership numbers.

Its membership decreased to 650,000 members in 1995–96 (it had more than doubled when Socialist François Mitterrand was elected President in 1981), before increasing today to between 700,000 and 720,000 members, slightly fewer than the Confédération Française Démocratique du Travail (CFDT).

According to the historian M. Dreyfus, the direction of the CGT is slowly evolving, since the 1990s, during which it cut all organic links with the Communist Party, in favour of a more moderate stance. The CGT is concentrating its attention, in particular since the 1995 general strikes, to trade-unionism in the private sector.

==== CFTC/CFDT ====
The French Democratic Confederation of Labour, CFDT is one of the five major confederations. It is the largest French trade union confederation by number of members (875,000) but comes only second after the Confédération générale du travail (CGT) in voting results for representative bodies.

The CFDT was created in 1964 when a majority of the members of the Christian trade union Confédération Française des Travailleurs Chrétiens (CFTC) decided to become secular. The minority kept the name CFTC.

== Asia ==
=== Japan ===
Labour unions emerged in Japan in the second half of the Meiji period, after 1890, as the country underwent a period of rapid industrialization. Until 1945, however, the labour movement remained weak, impeded by lack of legal rights, anti-union legislation, management-organized factory councils, and political divisions between “cooperative” and radical unionists. In the immediate aftermath of the Second World War, the US Occupation authorities initially encouraged the formation of independent unions. Legislation was passed that enshrined the right to organize, and membership rapidly rose to 5 million by February 1947. The organization rate peaked at 55.8% of all workers in 1949 and subsequently declined to 18.5% as of 2010.

The labour movement went through a process of reorganization from 1987 to 1991 from which emerged the present configuration of three major labour union federations, along with other smaller national union organizations.

== North America ==
=== US and Canada ===
The unionization rate in the U.S. and Canada followed fairly similar paths from 1920 to the mid-1960s; both peaked at about 30%. However the U.S. rate declined steadily after 1974 to 12% in 2011. Meanwhile, the Canadian rate dropped from 37% the mid-1980s to 30% in 2010. Part of the reason is the different mixture of industry, and part is due to more favourable Canadian laws. In the United States, the national trade union center is the AFL-CIO, representing about 12.4 million workers, while the Canadian Labour Congress represents over 3 million Canadian workers. In Canada, the CLC is both historically and constitutionally affiliated with the New Democratic Party, while the AFL-CIO has no formal political affiliation.

In 1937 there were 4,740 strikes in the United States. This was the greatest strike wave in American labor history. The number of major strikes and lockouts in the U.S. fell by 97% from 381 in 1970 to 187 in 1980 to only 11 in 2010. Companies countered the threat of a strike by threatening to close or move a plant.

=== Costa Rica ===
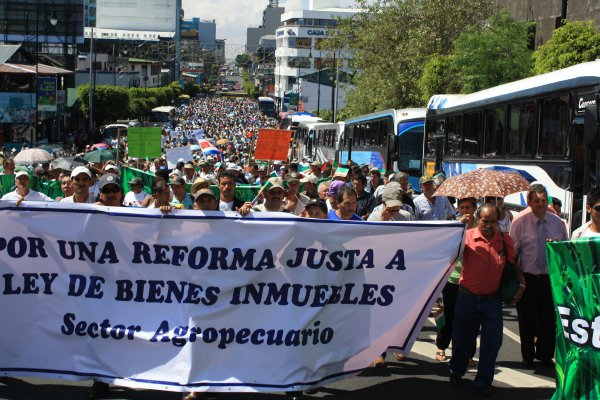
Costa Rican agricultural unions demonstration, January 2011

Labor unions first developed in Costa Rica in the late 1880s. The first unions were organized with the help of the Catholic Church. By 1913, the first International Workers Day was celebrated and unions, supported in particular by the Popular Vanguard Party, pushed for Alfredo González Flores' tax reforms. Unions grew in number and coverage. A major historical event for Costa Rican labor was the 1934 United Fruit Company, a national strike involving more than 30 unions which ended with many labor leaders imprisoned. Head of state Teodoro Picado Michalski violently repressed union leaders, leading to the tensions that created the 1948 Costa Rican Civil War. Labor unions continued to grow, supported by the Catholic church, and the first collective bargaining agreement was reached in 1967. Óscar Arias fought fiercely to dissolve and reduce the power of private sector unions in the 1980s. Arias' austerity measures led to a period of increased labor activity as poverty and unemployment increased. Despite the resurgence, unions, particularly in the private sector, still faced opposition and repression. During the 2007 Central American Free Trade Agreement referendum, labor unions unsuccessfully organized to encourage its rejection. They received a boost in political influence when Luis Guillermo Solís and his Citizens' Action Party earned the Presidency and several seats in the Legislative Assembly.

Labor unions are active in both the public and private sectors. Major concerns include salaries increased to reflect inflation, regulation of public commodities, and a stronger Caja Costarricense del Seguro Social (Costa Rican Social Security Department). Many labor unions are also asking for increased environmental regulation, and increased oversight of cooperative banks. One important issue for Costa Rica unions is passage a new labor law. Former president Laura Chinchilla vetoed it, but Solís appears to want the issue passed, as do many members of the Legislative Assembly.

== Unemployment ==
Economists have explored the linkage between unionization and levels of overall GDP growth and unemployment, especially in light of the high unemployment in Europe since the 1980s and the stagnation in growth rates. On both the theoretical and the empirical sides, experts have not reached any consensus.

== Violence in labor disputes ==
Between 1877 and 1968, 700 people have been killed in American labor disputes. In the 1890s, roughly two American workers were killed and 140 injured for every 100,000 strikers. In France, three French workers were injured for every 100,000 strikers. In the 1890s, only 70 French strikers were arrested per 100,000. For the United States, national arrest rates are simply impossible to compile. In Illinois, the arrest rate for the latter half of the 1890s decade was at least 700 per 100,000 strikers, or ten times that of France; in New York for that decade it was at least 400.

Between 1902 and 1904 in America, at least 198 people were killed, 1,966 workers were injured. One worker was killed and 1,009 were injured for every 100,000 strikers. Between 1877 and 1968, American state and federal troops intervened in labor disputes more than 160 times, almost invariably on behalf of employers. Business was disrupted, usually by strikes, on 22,793 occasions between 1875 and 1900.

Other examples of the violence both by and against U.S. union members in the late 19th and early 20th centuries include the Centralia Massacre, the Great Railroad Strike of 1922, and the Copper Country Strike of 1913-1914

== See also ==
- Trade union
- Public-sector trade union
- Union affiliation by U.S. state
