= Benjamin P. Sachs =

Physician

Benjamin P. Sachs is a British-born physician and academic who chaired the Department of Obstetrics and Gynecology at Beth Israel Deaconess Medical Center, Harvard Medical School for 17 years and later served as SVP and Dean of Tulane University School of Medicine during the period immediately following Hurricane Katrina. Known for his work in patient safety and medical education, Sachs helped lead the development of crew resource management-based team training in obstetric care — work that contributed to the creation of TeamSTEPPS, the national patient safety program of the Agency for Healthcare Research and Quality — and oversaw the development of specialized women's health centers abroad.

== Early life and education ==
Sachs was born in London, England, the son of Holocaust survivors. He earned his medical degree (MB BS) from St. Mary's Hospital Medical School (Imperial College London) and a degree in public health from the University of Toronto. He completed a residency in obstetrics and gynecology and a fellowship in Maternal-Fetal Medicine at Brigham and Women's Hospital in Boston.

In 1981, Sachs served as a visiting scientist at the Centers for Disease Control and Prevention in Atlanta. In 1987, he completed the Program for Management Development at Harvard Business School.

== Career ==
=== Harvard Medical School and Beth Israel Deaconess Medical Center (1978–2007) ===
==== Departmental and Academic Leadership ====
Sachs joined Harvard Medical School in 1978 and served as Chair of the Department of Obstetrics and Gynecology at BIDMC and Harvard Medical School from 1989 to 2007. He held the Harold H. Rosenfield Professorship in Obstetrics, Gynecology, and Reproductive Biology at Harvard Medical School and the Harvard T.H. Chan School of Public Health from 1997 to 2007. From 1999 to 2007, he served as the elected President of the BIDMC Physician Organization, representing approximately 1,500 physicians.

==== Preeclampsia Research ====
Sachs helped facilitate the research team led by Dr. Ananth Karumanchi that identified the probable cause of preeclampsia. The team's findings were published in the New England Journal of Medicine, the Journal of the American Medical Association, the Journal of Clinical Investigation, and Nature Medicine, and were the subject of a feature by Jerome Groopman in The New Yorker.

==== Patient Safety and Team Training ====
Following an adverse event in BIDMC's labor and delivery unit in 2000, Sachs, then serving as Chief of Obstetrics and Gynecology, partnered with Major Peter Nielsen, MD, to develop a crew resource management-based team training program for obstetric care, among the first such initiatives in medicine.

The program drew explicitly on aviation safety principles, a framework Sachs and colleagues formally articulated for clinical audiences in Contemporary OB/GYN and through the AHRQ Patient Safety Network. Funded by the Department of Defense and the Harvard Risk Management Foundation, the initiative encompassed not only frontline team training but the concurrent development of standardized quality measures for obstetric care. The program demonstrated reductions in adverse outcomes, severity of events, and malpractice claims. The work was recognized with both the inaugural Blue Cross Blue Shield of Massachusetts Healthcare Excellence Award and the 2007 John M. Eisenberg Patient Safety and Quality Award from the National Quality Forum and the Joint Commission, two of the most prestigious honors in American patient safety.

The impact of this work extended beyond BIDMC. Nielsen later wrote in Seminars in Perinatology that it was from this experience with obstetric CRM training in the military health care system that TeamSTEPPS was developed — the Agency for Healthcare Research and Quality's national patient safety program, subsequently implemented by more than 1,500 hospitals across the United States.

==== International Health Initiatives ====
During his tenure at Harvard, Sachs oversaw the development of international women's and children's health centers in the Philippines, Armenia, and Ukraine.

=== Tulane University and New Orleans (2007–2013) ===
Sachs joined Tulane University School of Medicine in November 2007 as Senior Vice President, Dean of the School of Medicine, and the James R. Doty Distinguished Professor. He assumed the role as the university was still recovering from Hurricane Katrina, which had inflicted an estimated $900 million in damage and led to the departure of roughly a third of the medical school faculty.

==== Community Health Reform ====
Replacing the city's historic dependence on Charity Hospital's emergency room, a network of community-based clinics was built through a partnership between Tulane, LSU, and Catholic Charities. By 2010 the network was serving over 175,000 patients annually — a model that HHS Secretary Kathleen Sebelius, during a September 2010 visit to the city, called worthy of being "continued and replicated" nationwide.

==== Infrastructure Development ====
Sachs worked with LSU and the Federal and State government to help secure funding for a new $1 billion Veterans Affairs hospital and a $1.2 billion University Medical Center in New Orleans.

==== Civic and Research Leadership ====
During his tenure in New Orleans, Sachs served as board chair of the Louisiana Cancer Research Center, whose new 32,000-square-foot laboratory building opened in 2012, and of the New Orleans Bio-Innovation Center, a state-funded bioscience business incubator. He also served on the AAMC Board of Directors from 2012 to 2014.

Tulane received the 2010 Association of American Medical Colleges Spencer Foreman Award for Outstanding Community Service during his tenure. Sachs stepped down from the deanship in 2013.

=== University of the Virgin Islands (2014) ===
In June 2014, Sachs was brought in to lead the development of a new School of Medicine at the University of the Virgin Islands. He led efforts to establish the school as the first LCME-accredited English-language medical school in the U.S. Caribbean.

=== Later Career (2014–present) ===
Sachs served as Senior Director of Strategy at an international healthcare consultancy from 2014 to 2018. From 2017 to 2020, he held concurrent professorships in obstetrics and gynecology at the Tel Aviv University Sackler Faculty of Medicine and at the Technion's Ruth and Bruce Rappaport Faculty of Medicine. He subsequently joined the University of South Florida School of Medicine as a professor of obstetrics and gynecology.

== Professional Affiliations and Leadership ==
- AAMC Council of Deans Administrative Board (2011–2013)
- AAMC Board of Directors (2012–2014)

== Honors and Recognition ==
- Recognition Award from the President of the State of Israel (2002)
- Award of Excellence, U.S. Department of Defense (2004)
- Blue Cross Blue Shield of Massachusetts Healthcare Excellence Award — inaugural recipient (2007)
- John M. Eisenberg Patient Safety and Quality Award, The Joint Commission and National Quality Forum (2007)
- AAMC Spencer Foreman Award for Outstanding Community Service — Tulane School of Medicine (2010)

== Selected Works ==
- Ricciotti HA, Chen KT, Sachs BP. The role of obstetrical medical technology in preventing low birth weight. Future Child. 1995 Spring; 5(1):71–86.
- Sachs BP, Kobelin C, Castro MA, Frigoletto F. Lowering the cesarean delivery rate — weighing the risks. N Engl J Med 1999; 340(1):54–57.
- Levine RJ, et al. Circulating angiogenic factors and the risk of preeclampsia. N Engl J Med 2004; 350:672–83.
- Levine RJ, et al. Urinary placental growth factor and risk of preeclampsia. JAMA. 2005 Jan 5; 293(1):77–85.
- Sachs BP. A 38-year-old woman with fetal loss and hysterectomy. JAMA 2005 Aug 17; 294(7):833–40.
- Levine RJ, et al. Soluble endoglin, a novel circulating anti-angiogenic factor in preeclampsia. N Engl J Med 2006; 355:992–1005.
- Mann S, Sachs BP. Lessons from the cockpit: Using teamwork to improve patient safety. Contemporary OB/GYN. 2006 Jan; 51(1):34–45.
- Nielsen P, Goldman M, Mann S, et al. The labor and delivery teamwork intervention trial. Obstetrics and Gynecology 2007; 109(1).
- Sachs BP, Krane NK, Kahn MJ. Medical school dean as a turnaround agent. American Journal of the Medical Sciences 2008; 336:181–184.
