= Members-only unionism =

Form of trade union

Members-only unionism, also known as minority unionism, is a model for trade unions in which local unions represent and organize workers who voluntarily join (and pay dues) rather than the entire workforce of a place of employment. In such a model, a union election is not held by the entire workforce to determine whether a majority wishes for the workforce to be represented by a local branch of a national union, but a union can nonetheless exist to support members who pay dues.

While majority unions tend to possess and guard collective bargaining rights, minority-union members may be organized by the union to privately file group-presented grievances to management. The ability of such unions to meet on workplace grounds also relies upon the discretion of management.

== Advantages and disadvantages ==
Members-only unionism allows members and organizers to operate under the radar of management, especially in regions rife with anti-union sentiment. It also allows for other activist and organizing models to be tried by a minority local union.

A disadvantage of this model is that businesses may not recognize a minority union as a collective bargaining agent for employees who are members. Strikes and pickets are likely not possible for minority unions, meaning that answers to grievances filed by members rely entirely upon the discretion and timing of management.

== United States ==
Marvit and Schriever wrote about the history of members-only unions in the United States, and how the model fell into near-obscurity after the passage of the National Labor Relations Act of 1935. The writers covered a number of examples of minority unions, including the Texas Workers Alliance (an independent local in San Antonio, Texas) and CAAMWU of United Electrical workers in Nash County, North Carolina.

A twenty-first century case of a minority union is UAW Local 42, which was formed in July 2014 at the Volkswagen Chattanooga Assembly Plant in Chattanooga, Tennessee. Despite a failed unionization vote at the plant, Volkswagen decided to recognize members who have joined the local. After the close vote against the UAW, Volkswagen announced a new policy allowing groups representing at least 15% of the workforce to participate in meetings, with higher access tiers for groups representing 30% or 45% of employees. Anti-UAW workers who opposed the vote created a rival union, the American Council of Employees. In December 2014, the UAW was certified as representing more than 45% of employees.
