= National human resource development =

Coordinated process of enhancing human resources nationally

National human resource development (NHRD also known as National human resource development) is the planned and coordinated process of enhancing human resources in one or more political states or geographic regions for economic and/or social purposes. NHRD has been recognized as a policy priority and undertaken as an activity by various divisions of the United Nations, national country governments (see list of NHRD efforts by country below), organizations involved in international development. Specific human resources targeted by NHRD policy or practice typically include personal characteristics like knowledge, skills, and learned abilities and aspects of physical and psychological wellbeing; examples of NHRD interventions include ensuring that general education curricula include knowledge critical to employability and wellbeing, assisting employers in implementing effective on-the-job training programs that promote both greater effectiveness and workplace empowerment, and working to benefit specific populations by, for example, aligning vocational education and training with maternal health services and nutritional support.

== Terminology and related concepts ==
The first country to refer to its integrated approach to human resource development as “national human resource development” was India in the mid-1980s. Especially when a particular national context is implied, NHRD is often referred to as “human resource development” or “human resources development” (HRD). For example, South Africa has established a Human Resource Development Council (HRDC) which coordinates efforts from multiple governmental departments with the aim of stimulating “a culture of training and lifelong learning at individual, organisational and national levels...”.

NHRD is sometimes thought of as a sub-topic of human resource development (HRD) which concerns the issues of training and development on a predominantly organizational level of analysis. NHRD has been highlighted as distinct from HRD not just in terms of its level of analysis, but because it deals with social and intuitional issues often not considered by HRD practitioners (for example, maternal health and international policymaking) and because national governments, international development actors like the United Nations, and other civil society organizations both use the term and at times conceptualize NHRD separately from issues of either employee-related training or development.

Because of its interdisciplinary nature, NHRD carries with it influences from other fields that focus on issues of the development of human resources including training and development, human resource management, and industrial and organizational psychology. For example, industrial and organizational psychology has considered entrepreneurship skills and the process of skills development in lower-income nations. As an activity or process, HRD on a national or regional level relates closely to and sometimes overlaps with issues in workforce development and the development of human capital within broader economic development efforts; however, NHRD is arguably distinct from workforce/human-capital development because of its emphases on economic and non-economic considerations, dynamics, and outcomes.

== History and major developments ==
While the planned development of human resources on a regional level has arguably existed since at least the Middle Ages, the first known use of the term “human resource development” in reference to an entire region or nation was in Harbison and Myers’s (1964) publication entitled Education, Manpower, and Economic Growth: Strategies of Human Resource Development which considered the issue of the development of human resources on a societal scale. Crucial steps in this international progression have been the work by the Economic and Social Commission for Asia and the Pacific towards integrated human resources policy provisions in national public policy in that region as expressed in the 1988 Jakarta Plan of Action and subsequently a 1994 report by the United Nations Expert Group Meeting on Human Resources Development in the Public Sector. The term `national human resource development' was introduced several times in the 1995 UN Secretary-General's Report on HRD to the General Assembly (A_50_330-ENG).

=== NHRD efforts on a national or regional level ===
Notable efforts toward promoting NHRD on a country level have included the establishment of policies, programs, and departments by a number of national or regional governments (see below for examples of how countries have engaged with NHRD).

One of the earliest human resources development projects on a national scale in Western countries was carried out in the United States in the 1970s by the National and State Occupational Coordinating Committees (NOICC-SOICC). These bodies were set up to regularly prepare and update labor-market and occupational information to assist career development, to support educational program design, and to meet employers’ information and training needs. The United States continued engagement in NHRD via the creation and maintenance of nationally representative occupational information in the Department of Labor's Dictionary of Occupational Titles (DOT) and the Occupational Information Network (O*NET) which replaced the DOT.

Outside of the United States, NHRD initiatives include the nationwide vocational education and training systems of Germany and other European nations (see below). In addition to efforts by individual countries, efforts to understand and develop human resources across countries in the European Union (EU) have been undertaken by the European Centre for the Development of Vocational Training (CEDFOP). For example, CEDEFOP has worked to develop profiles of the skills involved in occupations across the EU.

Outside of Western nations, India established the first Ministry of Human Resource Development in the Asia/Pacific region in 1985. In addition, a number of lower-income countries and emerging economies have often established NHRD departments, platforms, and plans that combine efforts from stakeholders involved in basic education, higher education and training, adult and continuing education, vocational education and training, labor advocacy, commerce, and/or various industries and professions (see below).

=== NHRD efforts on an international level ===
As early as 1965, international actors, including the United Nations, identified the development of “human resources” as an international policy priority. Beginning in the 1980s, over 20 reports of the United Nations Secretary-General and the General Assembly have addressed aspects of the development of human resources. Beginning in the 1990s, the use of an “s” was often added to the word “resource” in United Nations documentation in order to emphasize that human resources are diverse and important parts of an individual's unique identity, to avoid implying that human resources are undifferentiated commodities to be traded in exchange for monetary compensation or economic growth, and that coordination among stakeholders from a diverse array of sectors and concerns (for example, health, education, and private industry) are of relevance to the development of human resources.

Other notable international considerations of NHRD include declarations emerging from the 1995 Copenhagen World Summit for Social Development, the International Labour Organization's 2004 Human Resource Development Recommendation, and the 2013 United Nations Secretary-General's report on Human Resources Development, which tied the issue of NHRD to sustainable development priorities, information and communication technologies, and education in science, technology, engineering, and mathematics.

== Trends and approaches ==
=== International skills development ===
A number of NHRD-related efforts by international and national stakeholders have been focused on a particular form of human resources – namely, skills. These efforts have been undertaken both for the purpose of promoting economic and workforce development, but also for the sake of meeting important psychological needs, enhancing people's empowerment at work, and promoting greater participation in a country's political processes. Efforts to accelerate skills development within a given region include active labor-market programs that, for example, provide income assistance alongside vocational education and training. A particular challenge to skills development in lower-income countries, especially within the informal economy, is properly understanding current skill proficiencies, skill demand, and the most effective methods of skills development. The World Bank, the International Labour Organization (ILO), the Organisation for Economic Co-operation and Development (OECD), the European Training Foundation (ETF), the United Nations Educational, Scientific, and Cultural Organization (UNESCO), the G20, and the United Nations Development Programme (UNDP) have undertaken efforts to better understand and improve the skills of key populations, countries, and regions – prominently including people affected by poverty in lower-income countries. In order to overcome the limitations of existing information about skills and the difficulty of estimating skills in the informal economies of lower-income countries, scholars and international development practitioners have innovated with ways of directly measuring and indirectly estimating skills. For example, the World Bank has begun to directly measure skill levels instead of inferring them from existing labor-market information in urban centers in lower-income countries. In addition, researchers have combined both occupational employment figures and data on countries’ exports with information about occupations to estimate countries’ skill levels.

=== Country/economy-specific NHRD approaches ===
NHRD efforts, and models for NHRD initiatives and systems have at time been tailored to the economic, cultural, historical, and political realities of different nations. For example, Alagaraja and Wang (2012) proposed nine different models for a country's approach to NHRD. In addition, Oh, Choi, and Choi (2013) have highlighted considerations for measuring NHRD systems, including supply conditions (for example, the percentage of a population with tertiary education), demand conditions (for example, a region's unemployment rate), and supporting systems (for example, government expenditure on research and development).

As an example of the customization of NHRD approaches to the realities of certain countries, specific approaches to NHRD have been highlighted in countries that rely in large part upon natural resource extraction. In order to avoid and/or overcome social and economic issues resulting from overreliance on resource extraction, also known as the “resource curse”, Azerbaijan launched an initiative known as Converting Black Gold to Human Gold (BGHG) which refers to the conversion of petroleum resources into human resources. The BGHG approach to NHRD has emphasized, among other things, multi-sector partnerships, empirically-based skill measurement and projections, and the creation of a community college model of vocational education and training.

== Criticisms and controversies ==
Critics have argued that current NHRD scholarship lacks a rigorous and cohesive theoretical basis. In response, some have highlighted the importance of developing inductive and constructivist understandings of NHRD and efforts to develop NHRD theory have been featured in academic literature. Other critics have claimed that the idea of the development of a population's “human resources” can be dehumanizing if it overemphasizes economic outcomes because such an emphasis might imply that people and their characteristics are only commodities to be acquired, utilized, and/or improved for economic profit and growth. Others have emphasized the potential for NHRD to be a participatory process by which people's agency and “resourcefulness” are enhanced.

== List of NHRD efforts by country ==
Below is a list of NHRD bodies, programs, and plans listed by country. This list represents both a small sample of NHRD efforts undertaken by national governments and an attempt to create a growing list of NHRD efforts worldwide. Countries are listed alphabetically by titles used in Wikipedia (for example, “South Africa” is used instead of the formal title “Republic of South Africa” because the former is the title of the Wikipedia page devoted to that country). Examples do not necessarily involve the words “national” and/or “human resource” but they do pertain to the focus and scope of NHRD.

Azerbaijan

- Converting Black Gold into Human Gold Initiative

Bhutan

- Ministry of Labour and Human Resources

Botswana

- National Human Resource Development Strategy - 2009

Germany

- Federal Institute for Vocational Education and Training

Grenada

- Ministry of Education and Human Resource Development

India

- Ministry of Human Resource Development

Japan

- Ministry of Health, Labour and Welfare – Human Resources Development Measures Overview

Kiribati

- Ministry of Labour and Human Resource Development

Malaysia

- Ministry of Human Resources

Mauritius

- Human Resource Development Council of South Africa

Pakistan

- Ministry of Overseas Pakistanis & Human Resource Development

Saint Lucia

- Ministry of Education, Human Resource Development and Labour

South Africa

- Human Resource Development Council

United States

- State of Hawaii – Department of Human Resources Development
- State of Montana – Human Resource Development Councils
- National Science Foundation - Division of Human Resources Development

== See also ==
- Human resource management
- International development
- Human capital
- Economic development
- Industrial and organizational psychology
