= John Thomas Dunlop =

American politician and economist (1914–2003)

John T. Dunlop
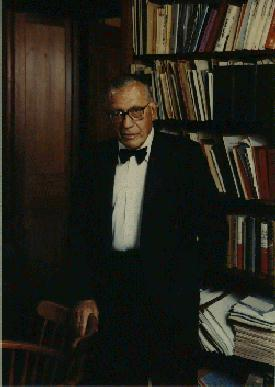
- Standing portrait of Dunlop.

14th United States Secretary of Labor
- In office March 18, 1975 – January 31, 1976
- President: Gerald Ford
- Preceded by: Peter J. Brennan
- Succeeded by: William Usery Jr.

Personal details
- Born: John Thomas Dunlop; July 5, 1914 Placerville, California, United States
- Died: October 2, 2003 (aged 89) Boston, Massachusetts, United States
- Party: Republican
- Spouse: Dorothy Emily Webb (m. 1937-2002)
- Children: 3
- Education: College of Marin; University of California, Berkeley (BA, MA, PhD)

Academic work
- Doctoral students: Michael J. Piore; Richard B. Freeman

John Thomas Dunlop (July 5, 1914 – October 2, 2003) was an American administrator, labor economist, and educator. Dunlop was the United States Secretary of Labor between 1975 and 1976 under President Gerald Ford. He was Director of the United States Cost of Living Council from 1973 to 1974, Chairman of the United States Commission on the Future of Worker-Management Relations from 1993 to 1995, which produced the Dunlop Report in 1994. He was also arbitrator and impartial chairman of various United States labor-management committees, and a member of numerous government boards on industrial relations disputes and economic stabilization.

Dunlop taught at Harvard University from 1938 until his retirement as Thomas W. Lamont University Professor in 1984. While there, he was chair of the Economics Department from 1961 to 1966 and Dean of the Faculty of Arts and Sciences from 1969 to 1973.

Dunlop came to be recognized in the postwar United States as the most influential figure in the field of industrial relations. Though primarily a labor economist and later an academic dean at Harvard University, Dunlop carried out advisory roles in every U.S. Presidential Administration from Franklin D. Roosevelt to Bill Clinton. He mediated and arbitrated disputes in a wide variety of industries and over a range of issues in the formative post-World War II period. He also influenced the study of industrial and labor relations with his framework of an "industrial relations system" that arose from his scholarly as well as applied work. In looking back at his own legacy, Dunlop regarded himself fundamentally as a problem solver with an abiding interest in the workplace.

Among the numerous books Dunlop wrote are Industrial Relations Systems (1958, 1993); Industrialism and Industrial Man (1960, joint author); Labor and the American Community (1970, with Derek C. Bok); Dispute Resolution, Negotiation and Consensus Building (1984); and The Management of Labor Unions (1990).

== Career ==
=== Early life and education ===
Dunlop was born in Placerville in northern California, where his family owned a pear orchard. Devoted Presbyterian missionaries, his parents moved to the Philippines when Dunlop was four years old, the eldest of a family that grew to seven children. He was raised and educated on the island of Cebu, and remained there until graduating from high school. Then, Dunlop returned to the United States with his younger brother William to enroll in college. Dunlop was initially rejected from the University of California, Berkeley because of his unusual background and instead enrolled at Marin Junior College in 1931.

Dunlop later transferred to the University of California, Berkeley, where he graduated summa cum laude in 1935. He remained there for his doctorate in Economics, where he produced the dissertation "Movements of Wage-Rates in the Business Cycle" (1939). While studying at Berkeley, Dunlop met with his wife, Dorothy Emily Webb; they married on July 6, 1937. That year, Dunlop attended the University of Cambridge on a fellowship, where he studied under John Maynard Keynes. At the time, Dunlop lived near John Kenneth Galbraith, who later became a colleague at Harvard.

Although Dunlop's intention was to study with Keynes during the fellowship, the elder's poor health limited their interaction. Nonetheless, Dunlop's study of wage setting in the cotton mill industry based on fieldwork conducted during that visit led him to publish a major paper in The Economic Journal in 1938 demonstrating a problem in Keynes' depiction of wage rigidity in the seminal work The General Theory of Employment, Interest, and Money (1936). In a laudatory note published with Dunlop's paper, Keynes acknowledged the correction and the contribution of the paper.

=== Professorial career ===
Dunlop was shortly after offered a teaching fellowship at Harvard University's economics department that he maintained throughout the rest of his life. He was tenured in 1945 and became a full professor at Harvard in 1950. He later chaired the Department of Economics between 1961 and 1966, and was Dean of the Faculty of Arts and Sciences between 1970 and 1973. Dunlop was named Lamont University Professor in 1971.

Dunlop focused on wage determination and the role of markets and institutions in their determination. He wrote a series of articles in economic journals regarding the role of unions in wage setting, arguing that unions focused on balancing wage gains in collective bargaining against their employment effects. He also explored the impact of product market forces on the level of wages, arguing that neoclassical models of wage determination underplayed the important (and sometimes idiosyncratic) role of product markets. In 1958, he brought together his scholarly work on wage determination with applied experience in dispute resolution in his seminal book Industrial Relations Systems. The book proposed a model of how an "industrial relations system" brings together product market, regulatory, and technological factors with the institutional practices of labor and business to produce wages, benefits, and other workplace outcomes. Several decades of scholarly debate followed its publication. He subsequently collaborated with Clark Kerr, Frederick Harbison, and Charles Myers on cross-national studies of the evolution of industrial relations systems, resulting in the book Industrialism and Industrial Man in 1960.

Dunlop trained several generations of doctoral students in the course of his career at Harvard. In the 1930s-50s, students included academics who became prominent industrial relations specialists, labor historians, and labor economists, including Irving Bernstein, David Brody, Morris Horowitz, Mark Leiserson, William Miernyk, Herbert Northrup, Jean Pearlson, Martin Segal, Jack Stieber, Lloyd Ulman, and Donald White. His students in the 1960s—80s went on to distinguished careers in labor and health economics, including Katharine Abraham, Kim Clark, Peter Doeringer, Richard B. Freeman, Jack Hirshleifer, Carol Jones, Garth Mangum, Daniel Quinn Mills, Joseph Newhouse, Michael Piore, James Scoville, Paula Voos, Michael Wachter, and David Weil. He collaborated with many other academics in a variety of fields including Frederick Abernathy, Derek Bok, Ray Goldberg, James Healy, Larry Katz, Clark Kerr, George Shultz, and Arnold Zack.

Along with his scholarly activities at Harvard, he was deeply involved in the creation of many programs and innovations at the university. In 1942, Dunlop, along with Professors Sumner Slichter and James Healy, co-founded the Harvard Trade Union Program, only the second executive program at Harvard (the first being the Neiman Fellows program in journalism) that continues to provide training to senior leaders in the labor movement in the US and around the world. He taught in this program from its founding until his death in 2003. An unnamed colleague told reporter Daniel Q. Haney of the Associated Press that Dunlop is "more at home with a plumbers' convention than with the Harvard faculty. He even sort of looks like a plumber, the way he always wears bow ties." He also helped to found in 1959 the Harvard Joint Center for Housing Studies. He played significant roles in the early days of the Harvard Kennedy School, and served as the acting director of its Center for Business and Government from 1987 to 1991.

Dunlop also played an active role in solving problems at the university. During a critical period in its history following the police bust in 1969 and subsequent shutdown of the university, Dunlop played a crucial role in restoring stability to the institution, leading a student faculty committee through a process to resolve the conflict and ultimately to introduce governance reforms. Following Nathan Pusey's resignation as president, he then served as Dean and as a close advisor to President Derek Bok during the tumultuous period of the Vietnam War, settling disputes between students, faculty, and the Harvard administration. Bok commented "He probably saved this university at a very critical time after the student riots in 1968-69" with "leadership and a cool head."

Many years later, following a highly contentious series of organizing efforts, a new union was elected at Harvard to represent clerical and technical workers. In light of the acrimony that accompanied Harvard's campaign against unionization, Harvard President Derek Bok tapped Dunlop to lead the university's management negotiation team. Dunlop negotiated with the lead organizer of the newly formed Harvard Union of Clerical and Technical Workers Union, Kris Rondeau, what is widely regarded as an innovative collective bargaining agreement that focuses on problem solving and staff engagement. The agreement remains in effect today, the ninth contract currently being negotiated in 2012.

Dunlop was a member of both the American Academy of Arts and Sciences and the American Philosophical Society. He remained on the Harvard faculty his entire life, taking emeritus status in 1985. Even after retirement, he remained active in research and teaching including leading newly established freshmen seminars at the age of 85.

=== Impact in Washington ===
Dunlop began his work in Washington during World War II. On January 12, 1942, President Franklin Roosevelt issued Executive Order 9017 instating the National War Labor Board (NWLB). Charged with settling labor / management disputes in exchange for a no-strike agreement, the NWLB arbitrated disputes across major industries. Because of its centrality in setting wages and benefits in a climate of military mobilization, limited resources, inflationary pressure, the NWLB's staff and leadership received a rapid-fire introduction to the problems and challenges confronting hundreds of enterprises.

From 1943 to 1945, Dunlop held the post of Chief of the Research and Statistics Branch of the NWLB and the experience helped him develop his fact-finding approach to resolving disputes. Several other NWLB alumni became major figures in the field of Industrial Relations including Clark Kerr, the future Chancellor and President of the University of California, and Benjamin Aaron, director of the UCLA Institute of Industrial Relations from 1960 to 1975. Derek Bok, former President of Harvard University, commented in 2003 that Dunlop "... was the last surviving member of a small group of people who came of age during World War II who had the respect of both business and labor."

In the war's aftermath, President Harry Truman selected Dunlop for the Atomic Energy Labor Panel. Between 1948 and 1957, he chaired the National Joint Board for the Settlement of Jurisdictional Disputes in the Building and Construction Industry. He served on the Wage Stabilization Board from 1950 to 1952, experience that would decades later encourage the Nixon Administration to put him in charge of efforts to oversee setting wages and price controls. In 1973, Dunlop replaced Donald H. Rumsfeld as director of the Cost of Living Council.

== Political life ==
In March 1975, President Gerald Ford selected Dunlop as his first Secretary of Labor. Dunlop focused on a variety of efforts that sought to bring the idea of multi-party problem solving to the regulatory process, and in implementing labor policies. His views on the importance of government policy in fashioning agreements among parties rather than through direct regulatory authority were laid out in his article "The Limits of Legal Compulsion". In that article, Dunlop notes:

The country needs to acquire a more realistic understanding of the limitations on bringing about social change through legal compulsion. A great deal of government time needs to be devoted to improving understanding, persuasion, accommodation, mutual problem solving, and information mediation. Legislation, litigation, and regulations are useful means for some social and economic problems, but today government has more regulation on its plate than it can handle.

The desire to bring parties together to solve problems led Dunlop to resign as Secretary of Labor. The construction industry remained an ongoing focus of Dunlop due to its important role in the US economy and particularly the potential of collective bargaining agreements in that industry to have inflationary pressures in the larger economies. Building trades unions sought changes in the National Labor Relations Act (NLRA) to reflect the distinctive problems of that sector in regard to rules regarding union recognition, organizing and the rights to picket. Through ongoing negotiations between trade union leaders and leading contractors and construction end users, Dunlop crafted an agreement between the parties that would amend the NLRA in ways sought by unions in exchange for their agreement along with management to longer term industry reforms, in a bill that would move in tandem through Congress. After brokering the deal and receiving support from Ford, the Common Situs legislation was passed by Congress. However, facing stiff opposition from a surging Ronald Reagan in the Republican primaries of 1976 and a more assertive Republican right wing, Ford reneged on Dunlop's pledge and vetoed the legislation. In January 1976, Dunlop resigned as Secretary of Labor.

Dunlop served subsequent administrations. In 1979, President Jimmy Carter appointed Dunlop the chair of the Pay Advisory Committee. Between 1981 and 1984, Dunlop belonged to President Reagan's National Productivity Advisory Committee, while from 1989 to 1991 he served on President George H. W. Bush's Social Security Advisory Council.

In 1993, the Clinton Administration named Dunlop the Chair of the Commission on the Future of Worker Management Relations (soon known as the Dunlop Commission). The commission was established to examine the need for reform of the National Labor Relations Act and related federal laws regarding workplace representation and recommend changes to them. Differences among Commission members and the midterm election of 1994 that brought a Republican majority to the House of Representatives thwarted action on many of the Dunlop Commission's recommendations. Dunlop nonetheless went on to work on promoting negotiated rulemaking for workplace health and safety and crafted an agreement between the Occupational Safety and Health Administration, the National Association of Home Builders and the Building Trades Council (AFL-CIO) regarding health and safety standards for residential construction.

=== Dispute resolution in multiple fields ===
Along with his service in government, Dunlop practiced dispute resolution in a variety of other areas, pioneering innovative multi-party agreements in a variety of areas. In agriculture, he intervened in an eight-year-old dispute between the Campbell's, the Farm Labor Organizing Committee (FLOC, an AFL-CIO affiliate that organized farm workers in the Midwest) and tomato growers in Michigan and Ohio regarding conditions of work among the migrant workers who worked for growers supplying Campbell's with tomatoes. Since agricultural workers are exempted from the NLRA, private sector employers are not obligated to recognize unions. In addition, the farm workers were treated as independent contractors to the individual growers supplying Campbell Soup. Growers contended that the prices received for their tomatoes precluded increases in wages or provision of better housing conditions in labor camps.

In 1986, Campbell Soup approached Dunlop to assist them in settling the dispute. Dunlop brought together the parties and fashioned an agreement ending the corporate campaign in exchange for union representation among tomato growers, including a mechanism for union recognition and dispute resolution through a Commission chaired by Dunlop and an equal number of representatives of labor and growers. The agreement also provided growers higher prices in exchange for agreement to bargaining with the union. As a result, the agreement created a private system of union recognition, collective bargaining and dispute resolution accepted by the parties. The agreement soon expanded to include pickle growers and the food processors Vlasic and Dean Foods and has been renewed consistently to the present. In 2003, an agreement between FLOC and the North Carolina Growers Association extending the Dunlop Agricultural Commission model was signed providing the only collective bargaining agreement covering guest workers from Mexico.

In 1979, Dunlop and Harvard University colleague Frederick H. Abernathy (Gordon McKay Research Professor of Mechanical Engineering and Abbott and James Lawrence Research Professor of Engineering), a professor of fluid mechanics, were commissioned by the Amalgamated Clothing and Textile Workers Union to undertake a summer study of the competitiveness of the men's suit industry. The study focused on the need to encourage research and development on the creation (and later the adoption) of technology in the textile and clothing sector. Eventually Dunlop's and Abernathy's efforts led to the creation of the Tailored Clothing and Technology Corporation [TC]2, a government-business-labor organization, funded cooperatively the three parties. [TC]2 initially funded development of new technologies for the industry. It later turned to a broader focus on encouraging the use of existing technology among clothing manufacturers and textile producers.[TC]2 is discussed in the Commentary of Dunlop, Industrial Relations Systems, Revised Edition (Boston, MA: Harvard Business School Press, 1993), pp. 36–37. In 1989, [TC]2 changed its name to the Textile and Clothing Technology Corporation to reflect its expanded mission. The group, now based in Raleigh, North Carolina, remains active in this area.

A final area of innovative dispute resolution arose in Dunlop's home state of Massachusetts. Following a growing number of disputes and walkouts among police and firefighters in the 1970s, Dunlop mediated an agreement between police and firefighter local unions, an association of municipal governments, and state legislators on legislation to create a tri-partite (labor, public management, with an impartial third party chair, nominated by the two sides and appointed by the Governor) dispute resolution body to handle collective bargaining problems in the sector. The legislation was passed in 1977 creating the Joint Labor Management Committee (JLMC). The vast majority of the more than 1500 disputes handled by the JLMC in its history were done through mediation rather than the final step which imposed a settlement on the municipal executive where the dispute occurred (but not on the legislative body, such as city council or town meeting that appropriates funds).

== Legacy ==
Dunlop produced a considerable body of articles, books, reports, and scholarship, with his work Industrial Relations Systems (1958) regarded as his biggest achievement. Thomas Kochan, the George Maverick Bunker Professor of Management at the MIT Sloan School of Management, commented that this "seminal book ... set the framework for scholarly analysis of our field for decades and became the focal point for debates over how relationships among labor, management, and government were structured and evolved over time."

The historian Ronald Schatz of Wesleyan University reflects on Dunlop and his generation of Industrial Relations (IR) specialists:

... the IR professors ... were not only academics but public figures as well. Many arbitrated disputes for the biggest firms and unions in the country and chaired government boards, and as time passed the leading figures in the field were appointed to be the presidents and deans of the nation's most prestigious universities – Berkeley, Ann Arbor, Wisconsin, Harvard, Columbia, Northwestern, Princeton. One became the leading liberal in the U.S. Senate (Paul Douglas), another the Watergate Special Prosecutor (Archibald Cox), another the Secretary of State (George Shultz).

Throughout his career in academics and the applied world, Dunlop attempted to apply lessons learned in his early experience in settling disputes at the NWLB to other venues. Drawing on his training in economics and his own industrial relations system framework and his insistence on having the parties agree on a common set of facts, he helped establish both a theoretical and a practical method of resolving problems and creating institutions for their ongoing evolution. In his introduction to a reissuing of his book Industrial Relations Systems in 1993, Dunlop wrote:

In response to inquiries as to why I have not chosen previously to comment on the substantial literature still in currency on Industrial Relations Systems, I have often responded that the analytical system was to be viewed as a tool to be used in analysis and problem solving. I find it useful and use it regularly in my practitioner's role. If someone else does not find it helpful, so be it; I am interested in any analytical framework that helps to resolve real problems. So tell me yours.

He continued that work until late in his life. Dunlop died in 2003 in Boston.

There are two lecture series delivered at Harvard University in honor of John T. Dunlop, including 1) The John T. Dunlop Memorial Forum sponsored by the Harvard Trade Union Program where he taught for sixty years and 2) The John T. Dunlop Lecture hosted annually by the Joint Center of Housing Studies of Harvard University and supported with funds from the National Housing Endowment.

In addition, Harvard's Graduate School of Design has an endowed professorship in Dunlop's name (John T. Dunlop Professor in Housing and Urbanization), which was first given to Rahul Mehrotra in 2020.

== Selected works ==
- Wage Determination under Trade Unions, 1944, 1950.
- Collective Bargaining: Principles and Cases, 1949, 1953.
- Industrial Relations Systems, 1958, 1993.
- Industrialism and Industrial Man, (with Clark Kerr, Frederick Harbison, and Charles Myers), 1960.
- Labor and the American Community, (with Derek C Bok), 1970.
- The Lessons of Wage and Price Controls – The Food Sector, ed., 1978.
- Labor in the Twentieth Century, ed., 1978.
- Business and Public Policy, ed., 1980.
- Dispute Resolution, Negotiation and Consensus Building, 1984.
- The Management of Labor Unions, 1990.
- Mediation and Arbitration of Employment Disputes, (with Arnold Zack), 1997.
- A Stitch in Time: Lean Retailing and the Transformation of Manufacturing--Lessons from the Apparel and Textile Industries, (with Frederick H. Abernathy, Janice H. Hammond and David Weil), 1999.

== Notes ==
Political offices
Preceded by Peter J. Brennan	U.S. Secretary of Labor; Served under: Gerald Ford; 1975—1976	Succeeded by William Usery, Jr.
