= Benjamin Aaron =

American lawyer (1915–2007)

- Born: September 2, 1915; Chicago, Illinois, U.S.
- Died: August 25, 2007 (aged 91); Los Angeles, California, U.S.
- Education: University of Michigan
- Occupations: Attorney, scholar, civil servant

Benjamin Aaron (September 2, 1915 – August 25, 2007) was an American attorney, labor law scholar and civil servant. He is known for his work as an arbitrator and mediator, and for helping to advance the development of the field of comparative labor law in the United States.

== Early life ==
Aaron was born in Chicago, Illinois. His parents were Henry and Rose (Weinstein) Aaron, and he was the youngest of five children. His mother died of tuberculosis when he was five years old, and his father died soon thereafter of multiple sclerosis. Aaron was brought up by an aunt and uncle.

He received a bachelor's degree from the University of Michigan in 1937. Aaron later said he became a lawyer because his father and two uncles had also been attorneys. He decided on practicing labor law after taking a class on the subject in his third year. Aaron received his law degree from Harvard University in 1940. He married the former Eleanor Opsahl, and the couple had two daughters.

== Federal service ==
Aaron served as a mediator with the War Labor Board early in World War II. President Franklin D. Roosevelt appointed Aaron executive director of the Board, and he served until the end of 1946.

In the immediate post-war period, Aaron served as a conciliator with the United States Conciliation Service and helped settle a number of labor disputes—particularly in California's aircraft industry during the post-war wave of strikes. President Harry S. Truman appointed him to be a public member of the Wage Stabilization Board on July 5, 1951. He was a strong critic of the Board's case-by-case method of awarding pay increases. During the 1952 steel strike, he played a role as a go-between for the United Steelworkers of America and the Board. President Truman appointed him vice chairman of the Board on May 29, 1952. Aaron was deeply critical of congressional efforts to cut the Board's budget, and declared that Congress should either fully fund the Board's activities or have the courage to legislate the Board out of existence.

== Post-war career ==
Aaron joined UCLA's Institute of Industrial Relations in 1946. He was appointed the Institute's director in 1960 and served until 1975.

In 1960, Aaron was elected a vice president of the National Academy of Arbitrators. He was elected president of the organization in 1962.

Throughout the 1960s, Aaron helped mediate a large number of labor disagreements, including disputes between workers and employers in the transit, railroad transportation, longshore, aerospace, health care, airline and agricultural industries. He helped negotiate the first contract between a county and a public employee union in California history in 1968. He later assisted the County of Los Angeles in drafting a public employee collective bargaining ordinance, and served as the mediator during the first contract negotiations between the county and its public employee unions.

President Lyndon B. Johnson appointed Aaron to the National Commission on Technology, Automation and Economic Progress in 1965. As a member of the commission, Aaron studied the effect automation, computer technology and robotics had on patterns of employment, job training and unemployment. The commission's 1966 report called for higher funding of the Job Corps' vocational training programs and concluded that the disruptions caused by technological change would not be as serious as many feared.

The same year, Secretary of Labor W. Willard Wirtz appointed Aaron to a national panel to study the need for reinstating the Bracero Program in order to ease a national agricultural labor shortage. Although the panel recommended relaxation of immigration rules to permit larger numbers of guest workers and Wirtz accepted the plan, Attorney General Nicholas Katzenbach overruled Wirtz just a month later and shut the bracero program down.

In 1970, Aaron mediated an end to a five-week strike by 14,000 members of the United Teachers of Los Angeles, AFT, against the Los Angeles Unified School District. Aaron's efforts helped end what is still (as of 2007) the longest teachers' strike in the history of California.

At the age of 68, Aaron helped mediate an end to a strike by pilots at Continental Airlines in 1983.

== Legal contributions ==
In 1966, Aaron helped form the Comparative Labor Law Group. Aaron invited prominent labor law scholars from the United States, the United Kingdom, France, Sweden, Germany and Italy to discuss each country's unique approach to labor and industrial relations. Over the next 12 years, the Comparative Labor Law Group produced three books and helped establish the legal discipline of comparative labor law in the United States. Due to his work in the field, Aaron became editor of the Comparative Labor Law and Policy Journal. Despite his advanced age, at the time of his death Aaron still served as Senior Editor of the publication.

Aaron was also a strong critic of American labor law. He contended that most judges lack experience in how the modern workplace functions and the specialized nature of labor law, and advocated the creation of "labor courts" to adjudicate employer-union legal disputes. He also argued that the Taft-Hartley Act was deeply flawed, although union members' rights needed additional protection not offered under the National Labor Relations Act, Taft-Hartley, or the Landrum-Griffin Act. In an article in the Comparative Labor Law Journal in 1979, Aaron argued that the National Labor Relations Act failed to protect the rights of the vast majority of unorganized workers and advocated major reform of the act.

== Death ==
Aaron continued to teach and write into his 90s. He died on August 25, 2007, at UCLA Medical Center from a cerebral hemorrhage suffered in a fall.
