= Charles Andrew Myers =

American labor economist

Charles Andrew Myers (Sept. 10, 1913 - April 2, 2000) was an American labor economist, and Professor of Labor Economics at the Massachusetts Institute of Technology, known from his study on "Management in the industrial world," published in 1959 and his work on labor and management.

== Life and work ==
Born in State College, Pennsylvania to Charles Emory Myers and Christine Bidelspacher, Myers obtained his BA in economics in 1934 from the Pennsylvania State University. Subsequently, he obtained his PhD in 1939 at the University of Chicago.

After his graduation in 1939, Myers started his academic career as instructor in economics and social science at Massachusetts Institute of Technology. He was promoted assistant professor of industrial relations in 1941. associate professor in 1944, full professor in 1949, and Sloan Fellows Professor of Management in 1967. From 1948 to 1964 he was also director of the Industrial Relations Section. He also served as charter member of the National Academy of Arbitrators.

Myers was elected Fellow of the American Academy of Arts and Sciences. In 1962 he was elected president of the Industrial Relations Research Association.

== Selected publications ==
- Myers, Charles Andrew, and George P. Shultz. The dynamics of a labor market: a study of the impact of employment changes on labor mobility, job satisfactions, and company and union policies. Prentice-Hall, 1951.
- Harbison, Frederick Harris, and Charles Andrew Myers. Management in the industrial world: An international analysis. New York, NY: McGraw-Hill, 1959.
- Harbison, Frederick Harris, and Charles Andrew Myers. Education, manpower, and economic growth: Strategies of human resource development. Tata McGraw-Hill Education, 1964.
- Pigors, Paul John William, and Charles Andrew Myers. Personnel administration; a point of view and a method. (1969).
- Myers, Charles Andrew, and Subbiah Kannappan. Industrial relations in India. Asia Publishing House, 1970.

Articles, a selection

- Kerr, C., Harbison, F. H., Dunlop, J. T., & Myers, C. A. (1960). "Industrialism and industrial man." Int'l Lab. Rev., 82, 236.
- Harbison, Frederick, and Charles A. Myers. "Management in the industrial world." The International Executive 2.1 (1960): 9–10.'
