= Robert B. Moberly =

American legal scholar

Robert B. Moberly is Dean Emeritus and Professor of Law at the University of Arkansas School of Law. His scholarship focuses primarily on dispute resolution.

== Education ==
Moberly received BS and JD degrees from the University of Wisconsin. He previously taught at University of Illinois, Maurer School of Law, University of Louvain, the Polish Academy of Sciences, and the University of Florida Levin College of Law, where he founded the Institute for Dispute Resolution.

== Publications ==
=== Selected articles ===
- The New Arkansas Appellate-Mediation Program, Arkansas Law Review, with Laura E. Levine, (2008)
- Labor-Management Relations during the Clinton Administration, Hofstra Labor & Employment Law Journal (2006)
- Introduction: The Arkansas Law Review Symposium on Alternative Dispute Resolution, Arkansas Law Review, with Judith Kilpatrick, (2001)
- Dispute Resolution in the Law School Curriculum: Opportunities and Challenges, Florida Law Review (1998)
- Mediator Gag Rules: Is it Ethical for Mediators to Evaluate or Advise?, South Texas Law Review (1997)

== Awards ==
- Center for Public Resources Award for Outstanding Alternative Dispute Resolution Scholarship, 1984
- Member of the Executive Committee of the National Academy of Arbitrators, 2009-2010
- Member of the International Society for Labor Law and Social Security
- Chair of Association of American Law Schools Section on Alternative Dispute Resolution, 1982-1985
- Former Chair of Association of American Law Schools Section on Labor & Employment Law
- Principal Investigator for the Bureau of Labor-Management Relations of the United States Department of Labor, 1987
- Principal Investigator for the United States Department of Agriculture, 1998-1999
- Commissioner of the Arkansas Alternative Dispute Resolution Commission, 2006-2011
