= Robert Moberly =

Robert Moberly may refer to:

- Robert Moberly (bishop) (1884–1978), British Anglican bishop
- Robert Moberly (priest) (1845–1903), English theologian
- Robert B. Moberly, dean and professor of law
