= Arnold M. Zack =

American arbitrator

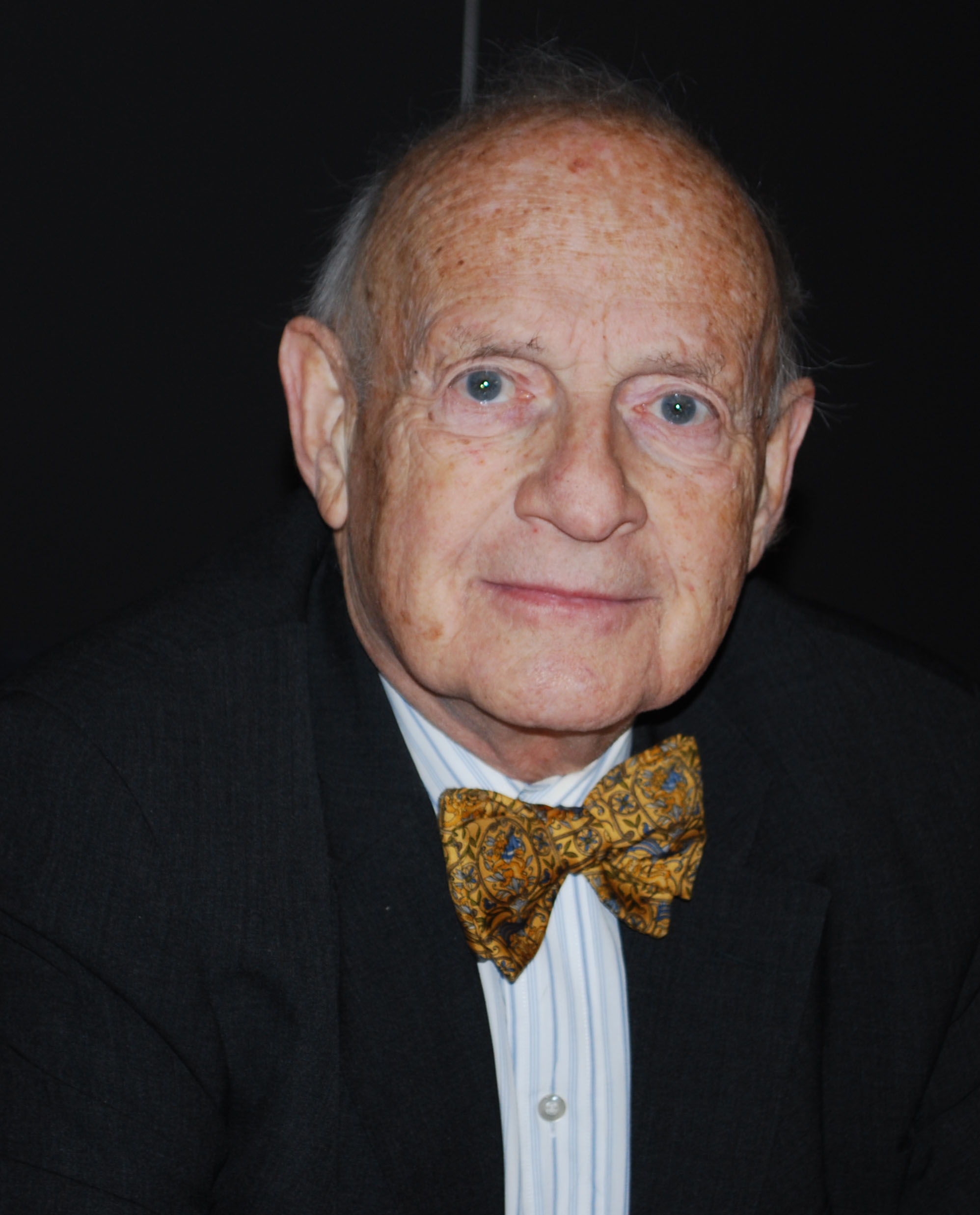
- Born: October 7, 1931 (age 95); Lynn, Massachusetts

Arnold M. Zack has served as an arbitrator and mediator of labor management disputes since 1957. Born on October 7, 1931, in Lynn Massachusetts, he is a graduate of Tufts College (BA 1953), Yale Law School (LLB 1956) and the Harvard University Graduate School of Public Administration (MPA 1961). He was a Fulbright Scholar, a Wertheim Fellow, President of the National Academy of Arbitrators and member of the College of Labor and Employment Lawyers. He served as a judge of the Asian Development Bank Administrative Tribunal and was President of the Tribunal since 2010. He also served and taught as senior research associate at the Labor and Worklife Program of Harvard Law School and the Harvard Trade Union Program since 1985.

Zack carried out a variety of duties for Washington. President Jimmy Carter appointed him a member of the Foreign Service Labor Relations Board, while Presidents George H. W. Bush, William Clinton, and Barack Obama selected him for a variety of Presidential Emergency Boards. For instance, on August 21, 1997, Clinton named Zack chair of Presidential Emergency Board no. 234, which sought to avert a strike facing Amtrak from its workers represented by the Brotherhood of Maintenance of Way Employees (BMWE). On October 6, 2011, Obama chose him as a member of the board to tackle labor disputes between the rail freight industry and its unions. While handling disputes in the rail and airline industries, Zack also served as an arbitrator for cases involving public sector agencies such as the Postal Service, IRS and various state agencies and governments. From 1990 to 2000, he undertook the chairmanship of Bermuda's Essential Industries Dispute Settlement Board. From 1998 to 2001, he also occupied the Chair of Bermuda's Essential Services Dispute Settlement Board. From 2002 to 2010 he helped to establish ISKCONResolve—the conflict management system for the Hare Krishna organization. He also had extensive experience interviewing trade unionists and promoting Arbitration mechanisms in South Africa. He was a visiting lecturer teaching Alternative Dispute Resolution (ADR) courses at Northeastern University, Simmons College, Cornell School of Industrial Relations, and Yale Law School. Zack is regarded as a student and protege of former U.S. Secretary of Labor John T. Dunlop, who saw himself as a problem solver and someone seeking to overcome polarizing ideological stances. In 1997, they co-wrote Mediation and Arbitration of Employment Disputes.

Zack received several awards for his efforts in dispute resolution: the Distinguished Service Award and Whitney North Seymour Medal of the American Arbitration Association, the Pioneer Award and Willoughby Abner Award of the Association on Conflict Resolution, the 2008 LERA Inaugural Fellow award, and the Cushing Gavin Award of the Archdiocese of Boston.

== Selected books ==
- "Labor Training in Developing Countries" Praeger (1964)
- "Understanding Grievance Arbitration in the Public Sector" US Department of Labor (1974, 3rd Edition 1980)
- "Understanding Fact Finding and Interest Arbitration in the Public Sector" US Department of Labor (1974, 3rd Edition 1980)
- "Grievance Arbitration: A Practical Guide" International Labor Office (1977)
- "Arbitration of Discipline and Discharge Cases"with Richard Bloch, American Arbitration Association (1979)
- "The Agreement in Negotiations and Arbitration" with Richard Bloch Bureau of National Affairs (1982, 2nd edition 1996)
- "Arbitration in Practice" Cornell University Press (1984)
- "Public Sector Mediation" Bureau of National Affairs, (1985)
- Grievance Arbitration: Issues on the Merits in Discipline, Discharge, and Contract Interpretation Lexington Books (1989)
- "Grievance Arbitration:Procedural and Ethical Issues" Lexington Books (1992)
- Zack, Arnold; Dunlop, John T. (September 12, 1997). Mediation and Arbitration of Employment Disputes. Jossey-Bass. ISBN 0787908479. ISBN 978-0787908478
- Arbitration: Discipline and Discharge Cases Labor Relations Press (1999)
- Arnold Zack: From A to Z Lulu Publishing House (2007) (autobiography)
