= Ray Marshall =

American government official

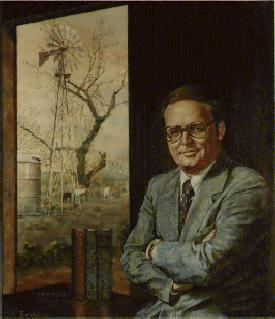

16th United States Secretary of Labor
- In office January 27, 1977 – January 20, 1981
- President: Jimmy Carter
- Preceded by: William Usery Jr.
- Succeeded by: Raymond J. Donovan

Personal details
- Born: Freddie Ray Marshall; August 22, 1928 (age 98) Oak Grove, Louisiana, U.S.
- Party: Democratic
- Education: Hinds Community College (attended); Millsaps College (BA); Louisiana State University (MA); University of California, Berkeley (PhD)

Military service
- Allegiance: United States
- Branch/service: United States Navy
- Battles/wars: World War II

Freddie Ray Marshall (born August 22, 1928) is an American economist who is the professor emeritus and Audre and Bernard Rapoport Centennial Chair in Economics and Public Affairs at the University of Texas at Austin.

== Early life and education ==
Marshall was born in 1928 in Oak Grove, Louisiana and had lived in an orphanage. Marshall joined the United States Navy in 1943 when he was fifteen years old and served during World War II. He earned a Bachelor of Arts degree from Millsaps College, a Master of Arts from Louisiana State University, and a PhD in economics from the University of California, Berkeley in economics. As a PhD student, Marshall's research was supervised by Walter Galenson.

== Career ==
Marshall has held several academic posts, but since 1962 has been at the University of Texas, with the exception of his term as United States Secretary of Labor as a member of Jimmy Carter's Administration. As Secretary of Labor, he expanded public service and job-training programs, as a part of Carter's economic stimulus program. Marshall was also one of the founders of the Economic Policy Institute in 1986.

In 1992, Marshall served as the Wayne Morse Chair of Law and Politics, established in honor of the late former Senator, at the University of Oregon.

== Books ==
- F. Ray Marshall, Labor in the South, Harvard University Press, 1967. ISBN 9780674507005.
- Ray Marshall; Marc Tucker (October 19, 1993). Thinking for a Living: Education and the Wealth of Nations. Basic Books. ISBN 978-0-465-08557-6.
- Editor: Back to Shared Prosperity: The Growing Inequality of Wealth and Income in America, ISBN 978-0765604255.

Political offices
Preceded by W. J. Usery Jr.	United States Secretary of Labor; 1977–1981	Succeeded by Raymond J. Donovan
U.S. order of precedence (ceremonial)
Preceded by Joseph A. Califano Jr. as Former U.S. Cabinet Member	Order of precedence of the United States as Former U.S. Cabinet Member	Succeeded by John Rusling Block as Former U.S. Cabinet Member
