= Richard B. Freeman =

American economist

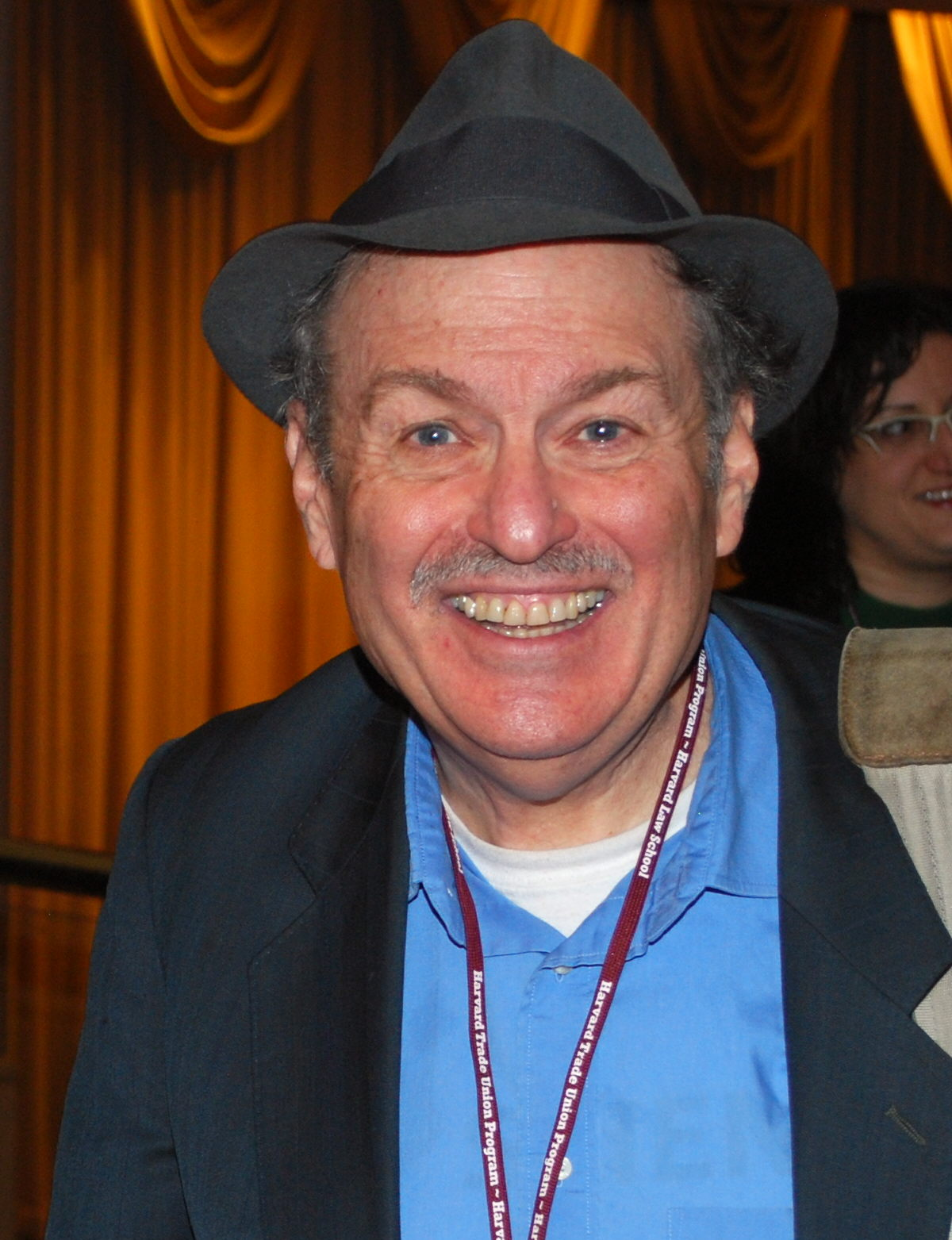
- Born: June 29, 1943 (age 83); Newburgh, New York, U.S.
- Occupations: professor, economist

Academic background
- Education: Dartmouth College (B.A., 1964); Harvard University (Ph.D., Economics, 1969)
- Doctoral advisor: John Thomas Dunlop

Academic work
- Doctoral students: Alan Krueger
- Website: users.nber.org/~freeman (NBER) scholar.harvard.edu/freeman (Harvard); Information at IDEAS / RePEc

Richard Barry Freeman (born June 29, 1943) is an economist. The Herbert Ascherman Professor of Economics at Harvard University and co-director of the Labor and Worklife Program at Harvard Law School, Freeman is also Senior Research Fellow on Labour Markets at the Centre for Economic Performance, part of the London School of Economics, funded by the Economic and Social Research Council, the UK's public body funding social science. Freeman directs the Science and Engineering Workforce Project (SEWP) at the National Bureau of Economic Research (NBER), a network focused on the economics of science, technical, engineering, and IT labor which has received major long-term support from the Sloan Foundation.

== Education ==
He received his B.A. from Dartmouth in 1964 and his Ph.D. in economics from Harvard University in 1969 for a thesis titled The Labor Market for College Manpower. He studied under Harvard Professor and Dean John T. Dunlop, who became U.S. Secretary of Labor under President Gerald Ford.

== Contributions ==
Freeman has written 18 books, edited 29 books and published over 350 published articles on a wide range of subjects including global labor standards, the scientific workforce, the economics of crime, how the internet is transforming labor movements, and historical spurts in the growth of labor unions. Freeman has made several significant but controversial contributions to economics and the field of industrial relations. In What Do Unions Do? (1984), he and his co-author James Medoff presented evidence that countered conventional wisdom in economics when they concluded that “unionism on net probably raises social efficiency” and that “recent trends have brought the level of union density below the optimal level.” Freeman's work on the economic theory of unions has found support in several subsequent studies indicating that in many fields unionized workers have delivered higher levels of productivity than their non-union counterparts. Nevertheless, some comparative scholarship indicates that the union advantage in productivity may vary by nation. Christos Doucouliagos and Patrice Laroche in an article entitled “What do unions do to productivity?” (2003) indicate that unions significantly lift productivity in U.S. manufacturing, but these authors countered with evidence that unions have had detrimental effects on productivity in the United Kingdom.

Freeman and his collaborators have explored how the tournament model of prizes and funding in the biosciences has favored older researchers and contributed to the degradation of conditions for postdocs and graduate students. He has carried out a variety of studies on the internationalization of science, as more than half of the PhDs graduating in science and engineering from U.S. universities in 2003 were foreign born, more than double the rate in 1966.

In his early career, Freeman often faced critique for his book The Overeducated American (1976), which suggested that the U.S. labor market would have vast challenges employing the millions of citizens with college diplomas and advanced degrees from the enormous expansion of higher education after World War II. The high-tech boom of the later 1980s and 1990s reassured most observers that expanding higher education was the trusted route to national economic vitality and achieving the dreams for prosperity sought by millions of individuals. However, Freeman's thesis that labor markets will not always be friendly to university-educated workers is enjoying a revival in the early twenty-first century. This re-consideration has gained momentum since the high unemployment and underemployment of college graduates following the Great Recession of 2008 as well as trends in globalization that have led to the off shoring of many jobs done by lawyers, accountants, information technology workers, and other well-educated professionals.

Freeman has made the case that expanding programs for employee ownership and broader-based profit sharing would help reduce inequality in the United States. He co-wrote with Joseph R. Blasi and Douglas L. Kruse of Rutgers The Citizen’s Share: Reducing Inequality in the Twenty-first Century (New Haven: Yale University Press, 2013), a work that French economist Thomas Piketty credited for tracing how “America used to be based on broad access to wealth and property” and then showing “how to revive” this tradition. Freeman has also written with Kimberly Ann Elliott studies of how human rights vigilantes have generated activism and consumer consciousness about apparel and other consumer products often manufactured under sweatshop labor conditions. Freeman carries out many studies of China's economy, in particular comparative studies of scientific innovation and workforces in China, the United States, and several other nations.

== Selected lectures ==
- Clarendon Lectures at Oxford University (1994)
- Lionel Robbins Lecture at LSE (1999)
- Luigi Einaudi Lecture at Cornell University (2002)
- Okun Lectures at Yale University (2003)
- Sawyer Lecture at Stanford University (2007)
- Jefferson Memorial Lecture at the University of California Berkeley (2007–2008)
- Kenneth M. Piper Lecture at the Illinois Institute of Technology, Chicago-Kent Law School (2009)
- V.V. Giri Memorial Lecture at the 53rd Annual Conference of the Indian Society of Labour Economics (ISLE), Mohanlal Sukhadia University, Udaipur, Rajasthan, India (2011)
- Ralph Miliband Public Lecture at the London School of Economics (2012)
- Lighthouse Public Lecture at Macquarie University (2017)

== Selected books ==
- The Citizen's Share: Putting Ownership Back into Democracy (with co-authors Joseph R. Blasi and Douglas L. Kruse) (2013)
- America Works (2007)
- Can Labor Standards Improve Under Globalization? (2003)
- What Workers Want (1999)
- What Do Unions Do? (with co-author J. Medoff) (1984)
- Labor Economics (1979)
- The Overeducated American (1976)
- The Black Elite: The New Market for Highly Educated Black Americans (1976)
- The Market for College Trained Manpower (1971)

== Awards and honors ==
- 2006 Jacob Mincer Award for Lifetime Achievement from the Society of Labor Economics
- 2007 he was awarded the IZA Prize in Labor Economics
- 2011 he was appointed Frances Perkins Fellow of the American Academy of Political and Social Science
- 2016 he received the Global Equity Organization (GEO) Judges Award
- 2016 Distinguished Fellow of the American Economic Association
