= Elaine Bernard =

Canadian historian

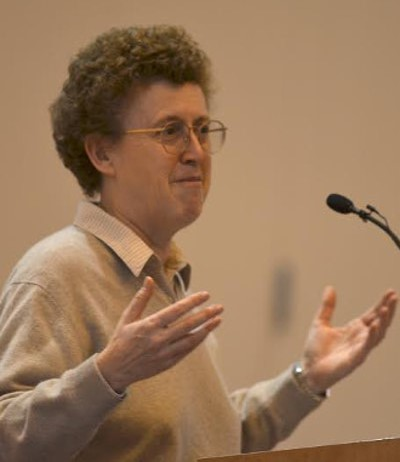
Elaine Bernard

Elaine Bernard is the former executive director of the Labor and Worklife Program at Harvard Law School and a member of the Democratic Socialists of America. She is also a member of the interim consultative committee of the International Organization for a Participatory Society which she describes as offering "an opportunity to reach across borders, time zones, organizations, communities, and individual interests and grow solidarity".

== Early life and education ==
A high school drop-out who was able to go to university without finishing High School, Bernard got a job as a service worker at Carleton University in Ottawa, Ontario, Canada. She began taking classes from 1971 to 1973. In 1976, she graduated with a bachelor's degree from the University of Alberta in Edmonton.

She obtained a master's degree in history from the University of British Columbia in 1979, and a Ph.D. from Simon Fraser University in Vancouver in 1988.

== Career ==
While working on her doctorate, Bernard worked as a labor historian for the Telecommunications Workers Union in 1980. She left this position in 1982. From 1984 to 1986, Bernard was a labor historian for the Brewery, Winery and Distillery Workers Union (now part of the British Columbia Government and Service Employees' Union).

During her studies at Simon Fraser, Bernard became director of the Labour Program in the university's Continuing Studies division. She continued in this role from 1983 to 1989.

In the fall of 1989, Bernard became executive director of the Harvard Trade Union Program (now part of the Labor and Worklife Program at Harvard Law School).

== Research interests ==
Bernard's research interests are widespread and varied. Her writings often focus on women and the traditionally female jobs, to which she brings a feminist and highly class-conscious theoretical perspective. She continues to focus on workers in the telecommunications industry, and the role technological change plays in altering work. In the last several years, she has publicly discussed how advancing technology will change how labor unions function (especially in regard to member-to-member and union-member communication and organizing).

Bernard's primary reputation, however, is as public speaker. She is provocative and blunt, and has been known to pleasantly shock audiences with her off-color language. Bernard often takes the American labor movement to task for not being aggressive enough in pushing its agenda, too willing to couch its opinions and conclusions in objective language, and for not engaging in strategic thinking. As Bernard herself has stated, her prescription is for the American labor movement "to be bold, to be explicit, be as loyal to labor as the business school is to business. Be audacious!" Such statements, as well as her skills as an orator, have made her much sought after as a panelist and public speaker.

== Memberships and awards ==
Bernard is a member of the Canadian Research Institute for the Advancement of Women (CRIAW), the Society for Canadian Women in Science and Technology (SCWIST), the Labor and Employment Relations Association, and the United Association for Labor Education.

From 1993 to 1995, she was a trustee of the George Meany Center for Labor Studies.

She is a member of the editorial boards of WorkingUSA and New Labor Forum and is a sponsor of New Politics.

She is a member of the National Writers Union, Local 1981, United Auto Workers, AFL-CIO.

== Selected published works ==
=== Solely authored books and articles ===
- "A University at War: Japanese Canadians at UBC During WWII" BC Studies, no. 35, Autumn 1977.
- The Long Distance Feeling: A History of the Telecommunications Workers Union. Vancouver, B.C.: New Star Books, 1982. ISBN 978-0-919573-03-1
- Technological Change and Skills Development. New York: Hyperion Books, 1991. ISBN 978-0-7300-1251-1
- Working Lives: Vancouver 1886-1986. Vancouver, B.C.: New Star Books, 1985. ISBN 978-0-919573-48-2

=== Solely authored chapters ===
- "The Future of Labour." In After Bennett: A New Politics for British Columbia. Warren Magnusson, Charles Coyle, R. B. J. Walker, and John Demarco, eds. Vancouver, B.C.: New Star Books, 1986. ISBN 978-0-919573-63-5
- "How Jobs are Changing, Where Jobs are Going, Who Controls Technology." In Union Strategies For a High Tech Era. Los Angeles: Institute of Industrial Relations, UCLA, 1989. ISBN 978-0-89215-150-9
- "Labor and Politics in the U.S. and Canada." In Labor in a Global Economy: Perspectives from the U.S. and Canada. Steven Hecker and Margaret Hallock, eds. Eugene: University of Oregon Books, 1991. ISBN 978-0-87114-153-8
- "A Labor Perspective on the Americans with Disabilities Act." In Arbitration 1993: Arbitration and the Changing World of Work. Washington, D.C.: BNA Books, 1994. ISBN 978-0-87179-819-0
- "Last Back: Folklore and the Telephone Operators in the 1919 Vancouver General Strike." In Not Just Pin Money: Selected essays on the history of women's work in British Columbia. Barbara Latham and Roberta Pazdro, eds. Victoria, B.C.: Camosun College, 1984. ISBN 978-0-9691844-0-9
- "Solidarity and Democracy: Creating Democratic Communities in the Workplace." In The New Labor Movement for the New Century. Gregory Mantsios, ed. New York: Monthly Review Press, 1998. ISBN 978-0-85345-937-8

=== Co-authored articles ===
- Bernard, Elaine and Schenk, Christopher. "Social Unionism: Labor as a Political Force." Social Policy. 23:1 (Summer 1992).
- Bernard, Elaine and Shnaid, Sid. "Social Unionism and Restructuring." New Labor Forum. Fall 1997.
- Bernard, Elaine and John Trumpbour, "Unions and Latinos: Mutual Transformation" in Marcelo M. Suárez-Orozco and Mariela M. Páez, eds.,Latinos Remaking America (Berkeley: University of California Press, 2002).
