= William Usery Jr. =

American labor union activist (1923–2016)

William Usery
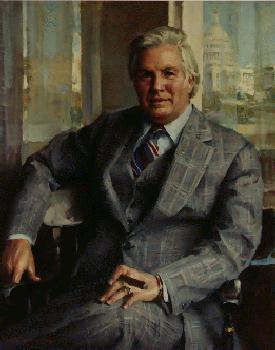

15th United States Secretary of Labor
- In office February 10, 1976 – January 20, 1977
- President: Gerald Ford
- Preceded by: John T. Dunlop
- Succeeded by: Ray Marshall

Personal details
- Born: Willie Julian Usery, Jr. December 21, 1923 Hardwick, Georgia, U.S.
- Died: December 10, 2016 (aged 92) Eatonton, Georgia, U.S.
- Party: Republican
- Spouses: Gussie Mae Smith (m. 1942; died 2005); Frances Pardee (m. 2006)
- Education: Mercer University

Military service
- Allegiance: United States
- Branch/service: United States Navy
- Years of service: 1943–1946
- Battles/wars: World War II

William Julian Usery Jr. (/ˈʌsəriː/ US-ər-ee; December 21, 1923 – December 10, 2016) was an American labor union activist and government appointee who served as United States secretary of labor in the Ford administration.

Although Willie was his birth name, official sources often mistakenly called him "William." For much of his life, Usery was known as "W.J.," although most associates called him "Bill."

== Early life and military service ==
Usery was born on December 21, 1923, in Hardwick, Georgia, the son of Willie J. Usery and Effie Mae Williamson (later Phillips). He attended Georgia Military College from 1938 to 1941. From 1941 to 1942, he worked as an underwater welder for the J. A. Jones Construction Company in Brunswick, Georgia, building Liberty ships. Usery married Gussie Mae Smith in 1942.

With the need for naval welders growing dramatically during World War II, Usery enlisted in the United States Navy. From 1943 to 1946, Usery worked on a U.S. Navy repair ship in the Pacific.

Following World War II, Usery worked as a steamfitter, welder, and machinist in Georgia. He attended Mercer University, but did not graduate.

== Career ==
On March 1, 1952, while working as a machinist at the Armstrong Cork Company, Usery helped co-found Local Lodge 8 (now Local Lodge 918) of the International Association of Machinists (IAM), AFL-CIO. Over the years, he was elected to a series of offices within Local Lodge 8, eventually becoming president of the local union.

While working at Armstrong Cork, Usery served as the IAM's special representative at the U.S. Air Force Cape Canaveral Air Force Missile Test Center (AFMTC).

In 1956, Usery retired from his job at Armstrong Cork after being elected a Grand Lodge Representative for the IAM. In this capacity, in 1961 Usery became the union representative on the President's Missile Sites Labor Commission. Usery was responsible for leading labor negotiations and helping to administer and service union contracts at Cape Canaveral AFMTC, John F. Kennedy Space Center, Marshall Space Flight Center Manned Spacecraft Center. In 1967, Usery was designated by IAM to a labor-management council at Kennedy Space Center. He became the council's chair in 1968.

=== Assistant Secretary of Labor ===
In February 1969, President Richard Nixon nominated Usery to be Assistant Secretary of Labor for Labor-Management Relations in the U.S. Department of Labor (DOL). Usery oversaw the implementation and enforcement of the Labor Management Reporting and Disclosure Act.

Usery helped write and implement Executive Order 11491 (October 29, 1969, which gave union organizing rights to two million federal government workers and established collective bargaining, grievance and dispute resolution procedures. The executive order had been long-sought by the American labor movement, and brought federal collective bargaining practices in line with those already in use in private industry.

During his tenure at DOL, Usery was instrumental in averting several large strikes. In April 1969, Usery helped avert a nationwide strike by the Brotherhood of Railroad Signalmen through round-the-clock, non-stop negotiations. He helped resolve collective bargaining disputes between the railways and the Brotherhood of Railway and Airline Clerks and the United Transportation Union.

Other strikes could not be avoided. Usery was part of a DOL team which was unable to avoid a national postal service strike. The illegal strike by more than 210,000 United States Postal Service workers began on March 18, 1970, in New York City. Nixon appeared on national television and ordered the employees back to work, but his address only stiffened the resolve of the existing strikers and angered workers in other 671 locations in other cities into walking out as well. Workers in other government agencies also announced they would strike as well if Nixon pursued legal action against the postal employees. The strike crippled the nation's mail system, disrupting delivery of pension and welfare checks, tax refunds, census forms, and draft notices. Businesses hired planes and trucks to deliver publications or letters. Nixon spoke to the nation again on March 25 and ordered a 24,000 Army, Army National Guard, Army Reserve, Air National Guard, Navy Reserve, Air Force Reserve, and Marine Corps Reserve forces to begin distributing the mail. But the military proved ineffective at distributing the mail.

Negotiations, in which Usery played a key role, resolved the postal strike in just two weeks. Postal unions, Nixon administration officials and Congressional aides not only negotiated a contract which gave the unions most of what they wanted, but which also established a legislative framework which led to the Postal Reorganization Act of 1970. Under the act, postal unions won the right to negotiate on wages, benefits and working conditions. On July 1, 1971, five federal postal unions merged to form the American Postal Workers Union, the largest postal workers union in the world.

Although influential in the Nixon administration, Usery was unable to persuade the president to refrain from temporarily suspending the Davis-Bacon Act in 1971. The act set wages for construction workers on projects receiving federal funds. But the Vietnam War was putting significant inflationary pressure on construction wages. Although Nixon suspended Davis-Bacon, Usery and others soon convinced Nixon to reinstate Davis-Bacon enforcement and establish a separate body to review union contracts. Within a year, the new committee had identified a number of wage increases it had deemed extravagant, and won renegotiation of the agreements. Soon, wage increases on Davis-Bacon projects dropped from 14 percent to 6 percent.

=== FMCS tenure ===
In March 1973, Nixon appointed Usery to be director of the Federal Mediation and Conciliation Service (FMCS), a federal agency which offered arbitration and mediation services to employers and labor unions.

On October 17, 1973, the AFL-CIO executive council unanimously asked Usery to become director of the federation's Department of Organization and Field Services. Usery accepted the offer. But when Usery told Nixon about his decision, Nixon asked Usery to reconsider. Usery subsequently declined the AFL-CIO's offer.

In part to reward Usery for his loyalty and as a sign of respect for Usery's mediation and negotiation skills, Nixon appointed Usery to be Special Assistant to the President for Labor-Management Affairs in January 1974. In this capacity, Usery advised the president on labor-management relations in the federal government and private sector, and became the presidential point-man in labor disputes which might have a significant impact on the national economy. The appointment lapsed after Nixon's resignation in August, but Gerald Ford re-appointed him to the position in January 1975. He continued as director of the Federal Mediation and Conciliation Service until appointed by Ford to be Secretary of Labor in February 1976.

=== Secretary of Labor ===
On February 10, 1976, President Gerald Ford nominated Usery to be United States secretary of labor.

Usery's tenure as secretary of labor, however, was limited. Ford lost the presidential election in November 1976. Incoming president Jimmy Carter declined to keep Usery on as secretary, installing F. Ray Marshall instead. Usery left office on January 20, 1977.

=== Later career ===
After leaving public service, Usery founded Bill Usery Associates, Inc., a labor relations consulting firm.

In 1983, Usery Associates was involved in automobile manufacturing industry negotiations between the United Auto Workers (UAW), General Motors (GM) and Toyota Motor. Usery assisted the UAW, GM and Toyota in crafting a contract which established a new, jointly-owned and -operated corporation, the New United Motor Manufacturing, Inc. (NUMMI). NUMMI implemented Toyota's "lean" production system in the U.S., but utilized a closed plant owned by GM. The UAW agreed to support the joint venture if NUMMI agreed to recognize the union at the NUMMI plant in Fremont, California. The UAW's support was crucial in winning an anti-trust exemption from the Federal Trade Commission. Usery was able to get GM, Toyota and the UAW to agree to a first-of-its-kind labor-management partnership: The UAW agreed to Toyota's production methods and Toyota agreed to make the UAW an equal partner in managing the plant's productivity and quality control procedures. The NUMMI collective bargaining agreement was signed in June 1985. The labor-management partnership has won a number of labor-management, productivity, quality and good corporate citizenship awards.

Also in 1983, Usery mediated an education workers' strike in Chicago which involved 38,000 teachers and paraprofessionals.

In 1985, Usery founded and financed the Bill Usery Labor Relations Foundation. The foundation assists and advises democratic unions and employers in Russia on how to improve and professionalize labor-management relations.

In addition to his consulting work, Usery served on several federal labor-management commissions. One of these was the "Coal Commission." In the 1980s, the United Mine Workers (UMWA) and coal mining companies began to dispute who was responsible for paying medical benefits to retired miners. The issue came to a head in 1989. The Pittston Coal Company (now part of The Brink's Company) refused to make its monetary contribution to the mineworkers' retiree medical benefits fund. UMWA struck the company. Secretary of Labor Elizabeth Dole asked Usery to mediate the dispute. Usery won both parties' agreement to form an Advisory Commission on United Mine Workers of America Retiree Health Benefits (the "Coal Commission"). The investigative body, which included Usery as co-commissioner, made regulatory and legislative recommendations to resolve the retiree health benefit issue. The Coal Commission's recommendations were enacted in the Coal Act of 1992 (Public Law 102-486).

From 1993 to 1995, Usery also served the Commission on the Future of Worker-Management Relations (the "Dunlop Commission").

In 1994, President Bill Clinton appointed Usery to mediate a major league baseball strike. In 1997, Georgia State University established the W.J. Usery Jr. Center for the Workplace. The center provides for the study of cooperative labor-management relations and serves as a resource for employers and workers seeking assistance in resolving disputes. In 2000, Usery began devoting most of his time to the work of the center. The W.J. Usery Jr. Center for the Workplace closed in early 2010.

== Memberships and awards ==
In May 1975, he received an honorary doctorate in social science from the University of Louisville.

Usery was a member of the Labor and Employment Relations Association. In 1999, he received LERA's Lifetime Achievement Award.

In 2004, the board of regents of Georgia State University approved the establishment of the W.J. Usery Jr. Chair of the American Workplace at Georgia State University.

In 2010, a new building on the Georgia Military College campus in Milledgeville, Georgia, was named "Usery Hall" after a generous donation made to the school to help fund the project. The $22 million school building serves as an educational hall to the middle school and high school cadets.

== Personal life ==
He died on December 10, 2016, eleven days away from his 93rd birthday.

== Notes ==
Political offices
Preceded by John T. Dunlop	United States Secretary of Labor; 1976–1977	Succeeded by Ray Marshall
