= Catherine Kerr (environmentalist) =

Catherine "Kay" Kerr (née Spaulding; 1911 – 2010) was a pioneer in environmentalism. She, along with friends Sylvia McLaughlin and Esther Gulick, founded the Save San Francisco Bay Association in 1961 which eventually became Save The Bay. The three friends also founded the Bay Conservation and Development Commission, the first coastal protection agency in America. Their efforts helped spark the environmental movement in the United States.

Throughout her life, Kerr fought to protect the San Francisco Bay from development and landfill and to restore wetlands and estuarine habitat.

== Personal life ==
Kay Kerr was born in Los Angeles and attended Stanford University, where she majored in journalism. At a peace conference in 1934 she met and later married Clark Kerr, who went on to become an economics professor and chancellor of the University of California, Berkeley, and then the president of the University of California system.
