= Raymond J. Donovan =

American businessman and politician (1930–2021)

Raymond Donovan
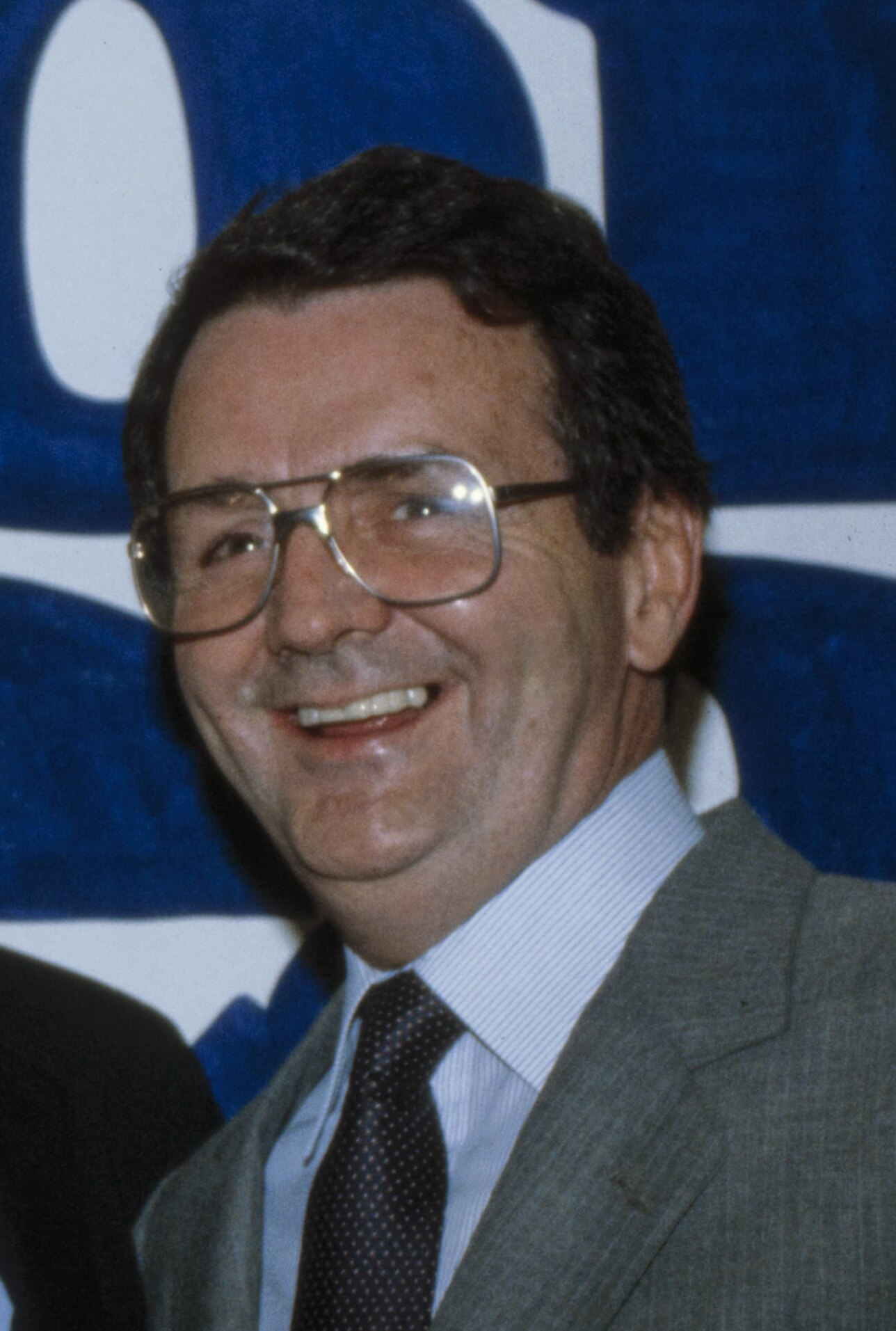
- Donovan in 1981

17th United States Secretary of Labor
- In office February 4, 1981 – March 15, 1985
- President: Ronald Reagan
- Preceded by: Ray Marshall
- Succeeded by: Bill Brock

Personal details
- Born: Raymond James Donovan; August 31, 1930 Bayonne, New Jersey, U.S.
- Died: June 2, 2021 (aged 90) New Vernon, New Jersey, U.S.
- Party: Republican
- Spouse: Catherine Sblendorio (m. 1957)
- Children: 3
- Education: Notre Dame Seminary (BA)

Raymond James Donovan (August 31, 1930 – June 2, 2021) was an American business executive and politician. He served as U.S. Secretary of Labor under President Ronald Reagan from 1981 to 1985. He resigned after being the first serving member of the Cabinet of the United States to be indicted, but was ultimately acquitted in 1987.

== Early life and career ==
Donovan was born in Bayonne, New Jersey, on August 31, 1930. He was the seventh of twelve children of David and Eleanor Donovan, both of whom died by the time he was 18 years old. He attended St. Peter's Preparatory School, before studying at Notre Dame Seminary in New Orleans, Louisiana. Although he contemplated becoming a priest, he returned to Bayonne after graduating in 1952 in order to look after his younger siblings.

Donovan was employed as a laborer responsible for unpacking Ballantine beer trucks, and became part of the electrical workers union. He then worked for the American Insurance Company until 1959, when he joined Schiavone Construction Company as its vice president in charge of labor relations, finance, bonding, and real estate. He was promoted to executive vice president in 1971.

== Political career ==
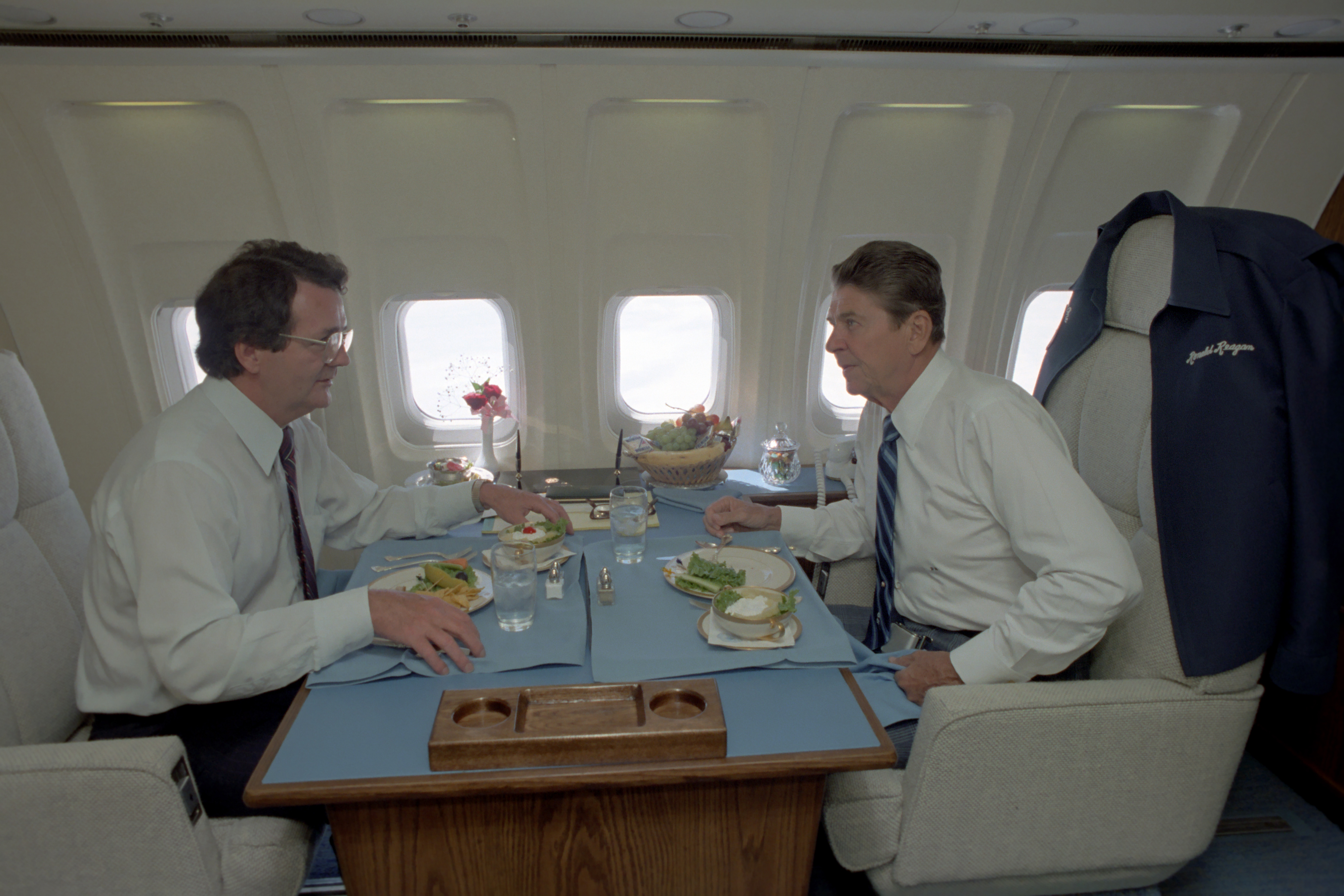
Donovan and President Ronald Reagan aboard Air Force One in 1981

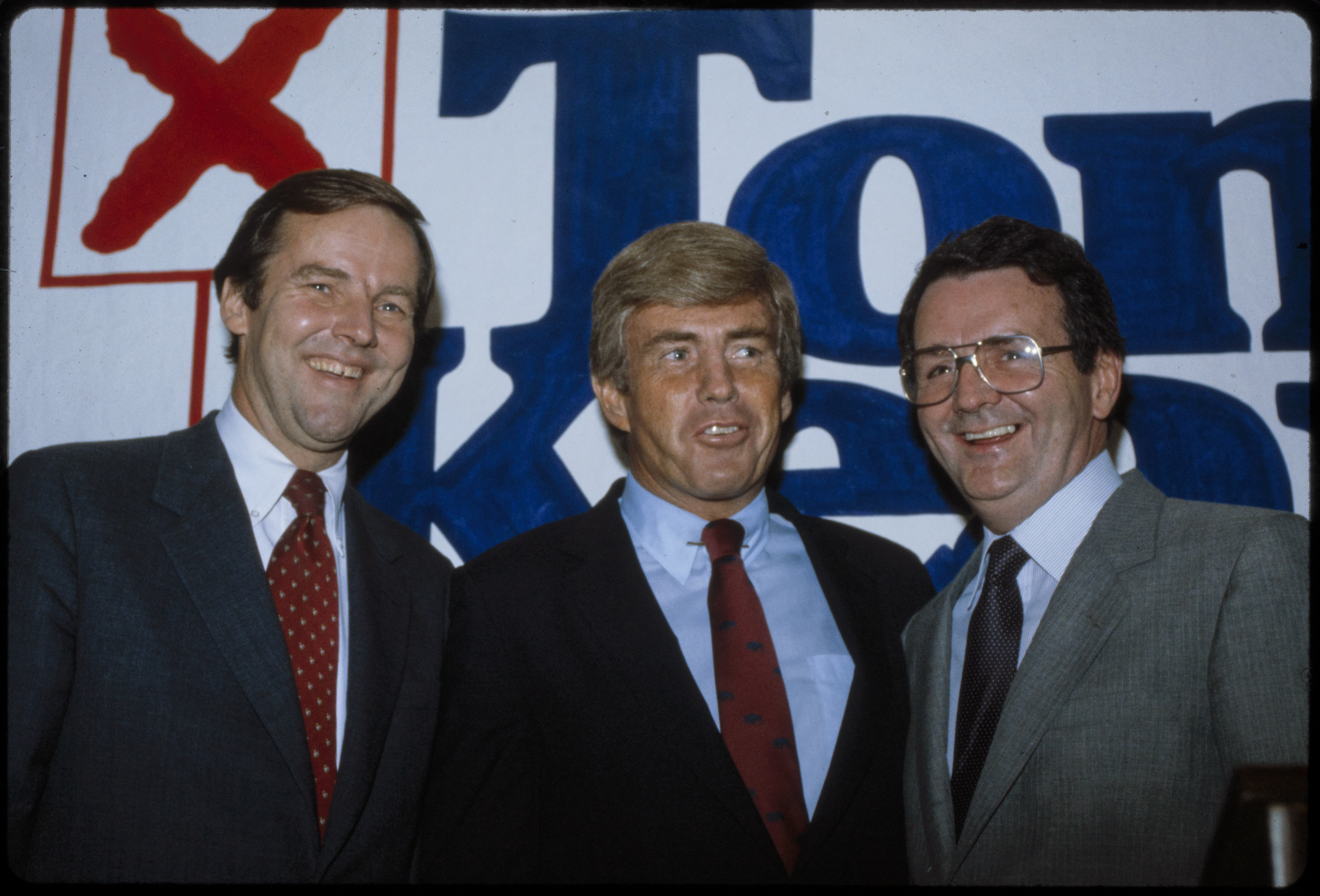
Donovan with Jack Kemp and Thomas Kean in 1981

Reagan appointed Donovan the Secretary of Labor on February 4, 1981. Under his stewardship, he reduced the department's staff and budget, reduced regulations on businesses through changes in the Occupational Safety and Health Act (OSHA) enforcement practices, revised the Davis–Bacon rules, modified Employee Retirement Income Security Act (ERISA) rules, created new industrial homework rules, and revised the federal compliance regulations.

Throughout his tenure, Donovan was noted for his frosty dealings with leaders of organized labor. His implementation of Reagan's conservative business agenda – of free enterprise with limited regulation from the government – was seen by them as reducing protections in the workplace and rolling back the hard-fought improvements they had achieved under the previous Carter administration. He resigned from his position on March 15, 1985, five months after he was indicted. He was the first serving member of the Cabinet of the United States to be indicted.

== Criminal investigation and acquital ==
In a highly publicized case, Donovan and six other defendants were indicted by a Bronx County, New York, grand jury for larceny and fraud in connection with a project to construct a new line extension for the New York City Subway, through a scheme involving a Genovese crime family associate and a minority-owned subcontractor. Schiavone Construction was required by its contract with the NYCTA to subcontract part of the work to a minority-owned enterprise. The essence of the charge was that the minority-owned firm (Jo-Pel Contracting and Trucking Corp) leased equipment from Schiavone and therefore was not truly independent of Schiavone. On May 25, 1987, Donovan (and all of the other defendants) were acquitted with a number of jurors openly applauding the verdict, after which Donovan was famously quoted as asking, "Which office do I go to to get my reputation back?" Reagan supported Donovan throughout the trial, and upon the latter's acquittal, affirmed how he had "always known Ray Donovan as a man of integrity" and "never lost confidence in him."

A second criminal investigation saw Donovan investigated by a federal special prosecutor. This was over allegations that he had ties to individuals in organized crime and claims that he was present when a union leader received an illegal payoff. No charges were pressed and the investigation was brought to an end.

== Later life ==
Donovan held 50% ownership in Schiavone Construction until its late 2007 sale to Spanish conglomerate, Grupo ACS. He also co-founded and was a part-owner of the Fiddler's Elbow Country Club. He was noted for his philanthropy in the field of education and to the Catholic Church. He also participated in a local program that assisted in exonerating individuals who had been wrongfully convicted.

== Personal life ==
Donovan married Catherine Sblendorio in 1957. They remained married until his death. Together, they had three children: Kenneth, Mary Ellen, and Keith.

Donovan died on June 2, 2021, at his home in New Vernon, New Jersey. He was 90, and suffered from congestive heart failure prior to his death.

Political offices
Preceded by Ray Marshall	United States Secretary of Labor; 1981–1985	Succeeded by Bill Brock
