= Sylvia McLaughlin =

American environmentalist (1916–2016)

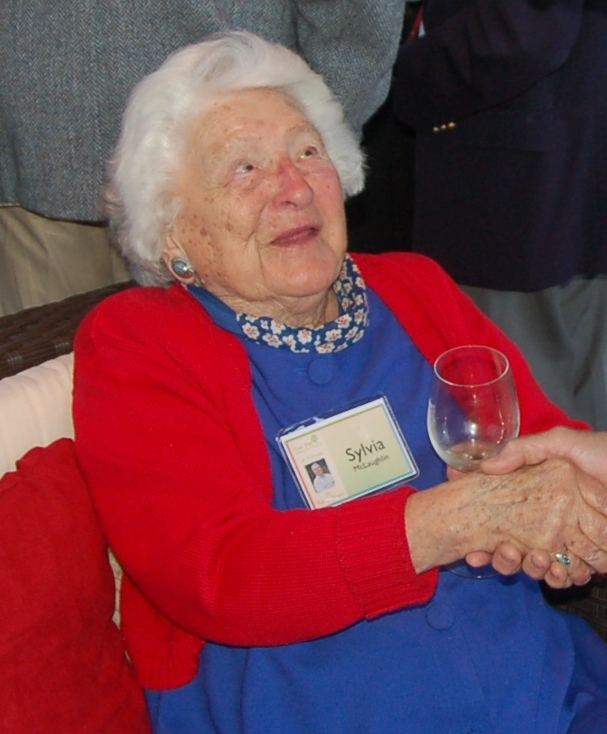
- McLaughlin in 2011
- Born: Sylvia Cranmer; December 24, 1916; Denver, Colorado, US
- Died: January 19, 2016 (aged 99)
- Occupation: Activist
- Movement: Save The Bay

Sylvia Cranmer McLaughlin (December 24, 1916 – January 19, 2016) was an American pioneer in environmentalism. She, along with Kay Kerr and Esther Gulick, founded the Save San Francisco Bay Association, which eventually became Save the Bay.

== Early life and education ==
Sylvia Cranmer was born in Denver, Colorado, the daughter of George E. Cranmer and Jean Louise Chappell Cranmer. Her father was a city park commissioner, and her mother was a violinist. Her maternal grandfather was Delos Allen Chappell, a Denver industrialist. While in Denver, she developed a love for the wilderness and the outdoors. She attended the Ethel Walker School, then earned a bachelor's degree from Vassar College in French in 1939.

== Activism ==
McLaughlin was president of the East Bay Vassar Club from 1952 to 1956. She was referred to as an "impractical idealist," a "do-gooder" and a "posy-picker" but she was credited as a leader in environmentalism, as one of the founders of the San Francisco Bay Association in 1961. "They were going to take the top off San Bruno Mountain and put it in the bay," she recalled in 2006. "That was considered progress." Save the Bay and other environmental organizations successfully fought the plans to fill in the San Francisco Bay, and led to the creation of the Bay Conservation and Development Commission.

She served on boards of directors for the National Audubon Society, People for Open Space, the Oakland Museum of California, and the San Francisco Exploratorium. She chaired the advisory council of the University of California's Water Resources Center. In 1963, she was a delegate to the White House Conference on Natural Beauty, and helped to organize California's state equivalent. She received the Benjamin Ide Wheeler Award as "Berkeley's most useful citizen" in 1977. In 2004, she won the Spirit of Vassar Award from her alma mater. In 2006, she attended the opening of Eastshore State Park. In 2007, she became a tree sitter in the Berkeley oak grove controversy but was unsuccessful.

== Personal life ==
Cranmer married mining executive Donald H. McLaughlin in 1948 and settled in Berkeley, California. She had two children and raised her two stepchildren in the Berkeley Hills. Her husband died in 1984. She remained active in the environmental movement until her death, on January 19, 2016. Eastshore State Park was renamed McLaughlin Eastshore State Park in 2012, in recognition of her "tireless" environmental activism in the San Francisco Bay area. She became the second woman so honored in California, after Julia Pfeiffer Burns.
