= Esther Gulick =

Esther Gulick (née Kaufmann, 29 March 1911 - 31 May 1995) was a pioneer in environmentalism. She, along with Kay Kerr and Sylvia McLaughlin, founded the Save San Francisco Bay Association which eventually became Save The Bay.

She was referred to as an "impractical idealist," a "do-gooder" and a "posy-picker" but she is credited as a leader in environmentalism.

She was featured in a Berkleyside article in March 2026 alongside Kay Kerr and Sylvia Mclaughlin as Women who were influential on the Bay Area's history.
