= Theodore J. St. Antoine =

American lawyer and legal scholar (1929–2026)

Theodore J. St. Antoine (May 29, 1929 – October 7, 2026) was an American lawyer and legal scholar. He served on the faculty of the University of Michigan Law School from 1965 and was the James E. and Sarah A. Degan Professor Emeritus of Law at the school. St. Antoine served as dean of the Law School from 1971 to 1978.

== Life and career ==
St. Antoine graduated from Fordham College and the University of Michigan Law School. He also spent a year at the University of London as a Fulbright Scholar. He began practicing law in Cleveland and served a tour in the Army JAG Corps before practicing in labor law in Washington, D.C.

He is known for his writing in the field of labor relations and labor law. He was active in labor arbitration of union and management disputes, acting as arbitrator in dozens of Major League Baseball arbitration matters, the parties of which have included the league and individual teams, agents, and players, including Curt Schilling, Sandy Alomar Jr., and Darryl Strawberry. St. Antoine served as President of the National Academy of Arbitrators in 1999–2000. St. Antoine was the official draftsperson for the Model Employment Termination Act (META). He also authored a defense of that act, The Model Employment Termination Act: A Fair Compromise published in the Annals of the American Academy of Political and Social Science in 1994.

St. Antoine taught as a visiting faculty member at Cambridge, Duke, George Washington, and Tokyo University, and in Salzburg. In his latter years he spent a great deal of time teaching labor relations and arbitration in Chinese universities, and speaking about developing labor law in China.

He edited the first and second editions of The Common Law of the Workplace: The Views of Arbitrators. He served on the internal board of review of the United Automobile Workers, a UAW-constitutional agency that provides redress for aggrieved union members.

St. Antoine died on October 7, 2026, at the age of 97.

== Bibliography ==
- Crain, Marion G.; St Antoine, Theodore J.; Craver, Charles B. (2005). Labor relations law: cases and materials. Newark, NJ: LexisNexis. ISBN 978-0-8205-6335-0.
- St. Antoine, Theodore J. (2013). "Mandatory Arbitration: Bane or Boon?". FindLaw, a Thomson Reuters business.
- St. Antoine, Theodore J. (June 1, 2002). "Justice Frank Murphy and American labor law". Michigan Law Review. 100 MLR: 1900.
- Theodore J. St. Antoine, ed. (2005). The Common Law of the Workplace: The Views of Arbitrators (PDF) (2nd ed.). Washington, D.C.: Bureau of National Affairs. ISBN 978-1-57018-540-3. a free downloadable book.
