= Clark Kerr =

American academic (1911–2003)

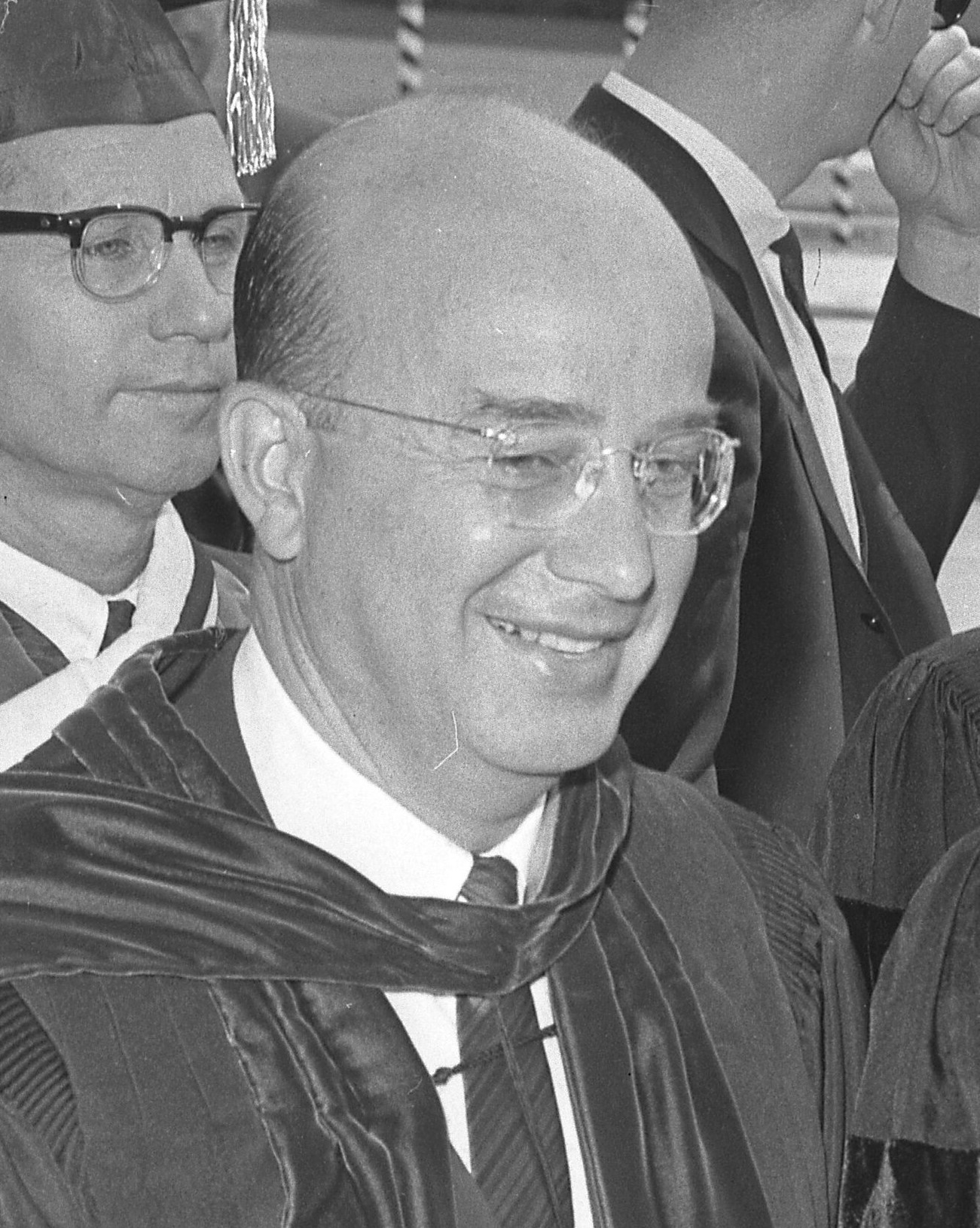
- Kerr in 1964

12th President of the University of California
- In office 1958–1967
- Preceded by: Robert Gordon Sproul
- Succeeded by: Charles J. Hitch

1st Chancellor of the University of California, Berkeley
- In office 1952–1957
- Succeeded by: Glenn T. Seaborg

Personal details
- Born: May 17, 1911 Stony Creek, Pennsylvania, U.S.
- Died: December 1, 2003 (aged 92) El Cerrito, California, U.S.
- Spouse: Catherine Spaulding Kerr
- Education: Swarthmore College (BA); Stanford University (MA); University of California, Berkeley (PhD)
- Profession: Economist, educator, administrator

Academic background
- Thesis: Productive enterprises of the unemployed, 1931–1938 (1939)

Academic work
- Discipline: Economics
- Institutions: University of Washington; University of California, Berkeley; University of California

Clark Kerr (May 17, 1911 – December 1, 2003) was an American economist and academic administrator. He was the first chancellor of the University of California, Berkeley (following the forceful split of UC Berkeley and UCLA into 2 separate administrative bodies), and twelfth president of the University of California. He is memorialized by the Clark Kerr Fire Trails near UC Berkeley.

== Early life and education ==
Kerr was born in Stony Creek, Pennsylvania, to Samuel William and Caroline (Clark) Kerr. He was raised on rural farms outside of Reading, Pennsylvania, first in the Stony Creek area and then in the Oley Valley after age 10. Even after Kerr became one of the most prominent academic administrators of his generation, he always regarded himself as a "Pennsylvania farm boy" and expressed frustration with intellectuals who showed condescension towards agriculture.

Kerr was the co-author of the article "Putting the Unemployed at Productive Labor" with economist Paul S Taylor in the Annals of the American Academy of Political and Social Science, 1934, while working with Taylor documenting migrant conditions in 1933-34.

Kerr earned his A.B. from Swarthmore College in 1932, an M.A. in economics from Stanford University in 1933, and a Ph.D. in economics from UC Berkeley in 1939. In 1940 he was a UC Newton Booth Fellow studying at the London School of Economics. In 1945, he became an associate professor of industrial relations and was the founding director of the UC Berkeley Institute of Industrial Relations.

== Career ==
=== UC Berkeley ===
In 1949, soon after the beginning of the McCarthy era, the Regents of the University of California adopted an anti-communist loyalty oath to be signed by all University of California employees. Kerr signed the oath, but fought against the firing of those who refused to sign. Kerr gained respect from his stance and was named University of California, Berkeley's first chancellor when that position was created in 1952. As chancellor, Kerr oversaw the construction of 12 high-rise dormitories. In September 1953, then U.S. president Dwight D. Eisenhower appointed him to the Commission on Intergovernmental Relations.

=== University of California president ===
The chancellor's job had come to be defined as providing parking for the faculty, sex for the students, and athletics for the alumni.

— 1957

The university president in the United States is expected to be a friend of the students, a colleague of the faculty, a good fellow with the alumni, a sound administrator with the trustees, a good speaker with the public, an astute bargainer with the foundations and the federal agencies, a politician with the state legislature, a friend of industry, labor, and agriculture, a persuasive diplomat with the donors, a champion of education generally, a supporter of the professions (particularly law and medicine), a spokesman to the press, a scholar in his own right, a public servant at the state and national levels, a devotee of opera and football equally, a decent human being, a good husband and father, an active member of a church. Above all he must enjoy traveling in airplanes, eating his meals in public, and attending public ceremonies. No one can be all of these things. Some succeed at being none.

— 1995

The University is not engaged in making ideas safe for students. It is engaged in making students safe for ideas. Thus it permits the freest expression of views before students, trusting to their good sense in passing judgment on these views.

— 1961

In October 1957, Kerr was the Board of Regents' unanimous choice to lead the entire university system. Raymond B. Allen had been widely expected to succeed Robert Gordon Sproul as systemwide president, but Allen's tenure as UCLA's first chancellor was marred by athletics scandals, poor campus planning, and the perception among the southern regents that he had not put up enough resistance—especially in comparison to Kerr—to Sproul's stubborn refusal to delegate anything to the campus chancellors. Therefore, when Sproul finally announced his retirement in 1957, Allen was passed over in favor of Kerr. With a clear mandate for change, Kerr led UC's rapid transformation into a true public university system through a series of proposals adopted unanimously by the regents from 1957 to 1960. Kerr's reforms included delegating to the chancellors the full range of powers, privileges, and responsibilities which Sproul had previously denied them.

Kerr's term as UC president saw the opening of campuses in San Diego, Irvine, and Santa Cruz to accommodate the influx of baby boomers. Faced with a dramatic increase of students entering college, Kerr helped establish the now much-copied California system of having the handful of University of California campuses act as 'top tier' research institutions, the more numerous California State University campuses handle the bulk of undergraduate students and the very numerous California Community College campuses provide vocational and transfer-oriented college programs to the remainder. A Mother Jones article mentioned that Kerr's achievements in this field earned him international acclaim.

In 1959, Kerr along with Chancellor Glenn T. Seaborg helped found the Berkeley Space Sciences Laboratory.

==== Student protests ====
On March 22, 1961, at the invitation of SLATE, Frank Wilkinson gave a speech at the Berkeley campus, and in response to the ensuing controversy, Kerr defended the importance of freedom of speech: "The University is not engaged in making ideas safe for students. It is engaged in making students safe for ideas." His remarks were widely quoted, and Regent Thomas M. Storke arranged to have them engraved on a bell at Storke Tower at the Santa Barbara campus.

Controversy exploded in 1964 when Berkeley students led the Free Speech Movement in protest of regulations limiting political activities on campus, including Civil Rights advocacy and protests against the Vietnam War. It culminated in hundreds of arrested students at a sit-in. Kerr's initial decision was to not expel University of California students that participated in sit-ins off campus. That decision evolved into reluctance to expel students who later protested on campus, in a series of escalating events on the Berkeley campus in late 1964. Kerr was criticized both by students, for not agreeing to their demands, and by conservative UC Regent Edwin Pauley and others, for responding too leniently to the student unrest.

==== Blacklisting ====
In late 1964, President Lyndon Johnson picked Kerr to become secretary of Health, Education and Welfare. He later withdrew the nomination after the FBI background check on Kerr included damaging information the agency knew to be false. Almost 40 years later, in 2002, the FBI released documents used to blacklist Kerr as part of a government campaign to suppress subversive viewpoints at the university. This information had been classified by the FBI and was released only after a fifteen-year legal battle that the FBI repeatedly appealed up to the Supreme Court, but agreed to settle before the Supreme Court decided on hearing the matter.

Edwin Pauley approached John McCone, a Berkeley alum and associate, at the CIA for assistance. McCone in turn met with FBI director J. Edgar Hoover. Hoover agreed to supply Pauley with confidential FBI information on "ultra-liberal" regents, faculty members, and students, and to assist in removing Kerr. Pauley received dozens of briefings from the FBI to this end. The FBI assisted Pauley and Ronald Reagan in painting Kerr as a dangerous "liberal".

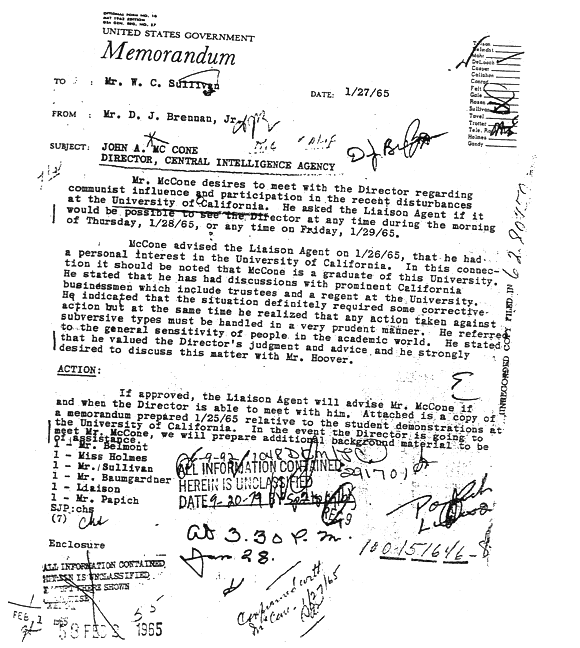
CIA's McCone, at Pauley's request, asks Hoover to target anti-war protests at UC Berkeley.

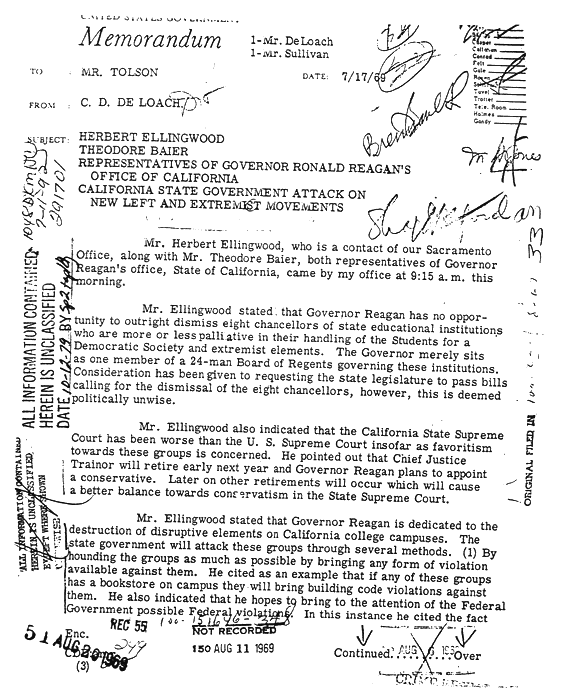
1969 FBI memo re: Ronald Reagan's purge of UC Berkeley, p. 1

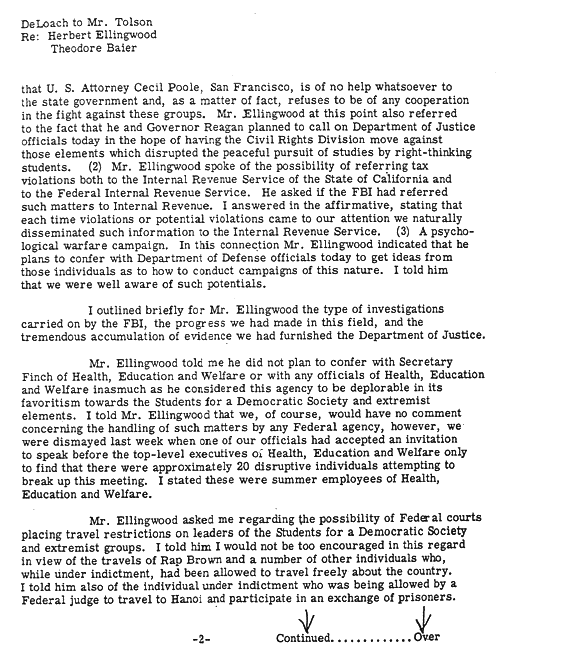
1969 FBI memo re: Ronald Reagan's purge of UC Berkeley, p. 2

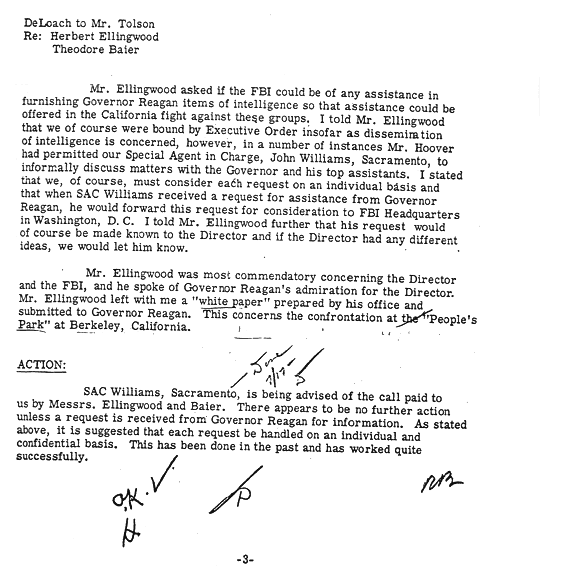
1969 FBI memo re: Ronald Reagan's purge of UC Berkeley, p. 3

==== Dismissal ====
During his successful campaign in the 1966 California gubernatorial election, Reagan repeatedly promised to "clean up the mess at Berkeley." In 1987, Lyn Nofziger revealed to Kerr that Reagan actually did not know much about UC at the beginning of his campaign, but had tacked right in order to prevail in the Republican primary against George Christopher, and started focusing on the "student revolt at Berkeley" after a poll determined that it was a priority of Republican voters. As a newly elected governor, Reagan appointed several more regents who, together with himself (in his capacity as an ex officio regent) aligned with existing members of the Board of Regents to form a majority (14 to 8) to vote for Kerr's dismissal on January 20, 1967. Kerr knew what was coming and did not actively fight it in the sense of actively lobbying individual regents. But as a matter of principle (because he felt the Board of Regents should have stood up for the university's institutional autonomy from the rest of the state government), Kerr chose to not make it easy for Reagan by not resigning, even though he believed it would mean bearing the lifelong stigma of being dismissed.

Shortly thereafter, Kerr's old friend Storke insisted that Kerr should be allowed to participate, as previously scheduled, in the dedication of a building on the Santa Barbara campus in Storke's honor. At the dedication ceremony Kerr stated that he had left the presidency of the university just as he had entered it: "fired with enthusiasm".

Kerr's second memoir, The Gold and the Blue: A Personal Memoir of the University of California, 1949–1967 Volume Two: Political Turmoil details what he refers to as his greatest blunders in dealing with the Free Speech Movement that ultimately led to his firing.

Historian Nick Fischer wrote of Kerr's tenure, "Kerr was widely esteemed as one of the most able university leaders, with a sophisticated grasp of the diverse purposes of universities in the postwar era. Under his presidency UC had come to be regarded as the nation's premier public university. Moreover, Kerr had led the development of a fifteen-year Master Plan for California's higher education system that made the state a leader in educational strategy and performance."

==== Later career ====
Following his dismissal, Kerr served on the Carnegie Commission on Higher Education until 1973 and was chairman of the Carnegie Council on Policy Studies in Higher Education from 1974 to 1979.

Kerr also served as chair of the 1984 USPS National Agreement Arbitration Panel, after which he joined the USPS panel of national contract arbitrators.

=== Personal life, and death ===
Kerr was married to Catherine "Kay" Spaulding on Christmas Day, 1934. Kay, along with friends, founded the Save San Francisco Bay Association in 1961, which became Save the Bay. The couple had three children; Clark E., Jr., Alexander, and Caroline Gage.

Kerr died on December 1, 2003, in El Cerrito, California, following complications from a fall.

== Legacy and honors ==
There are Kerr Halls on the Davis, Santa Barbara, and Santa Cruz campuses. At UC Berkeley the Clark Kerr Campus is a 50-acre student residence complex.

The Clark Kerr Award is named in his honor. Since 1968, it has been awarded annually by the UC Berkeley Academic Senate to recognize an individual who has made an extraordinary and distinguished contribution to the advancement of higher education. Kerr himself was the first recipient of the award.

== Bibliography ==
- Charles Burress "The Long, Hard Years at Berkeley; Second Volume of Clark Kerr's Memoir Covers Politics and 'Blunders'", San Francisco Chronicle, February 9, 2003, Sunday Review, p. 1.
- Arthur Levine (ed., 1993). Higher Learning in America. Baltimore: The Johns Hopkins University Press.
- Seth Rosenfeld Subversives: The FBI's War on Student Radicals, and Reagan's Rise to Power. Farrar, Straus and Giroux, 2012. ISBN 9780374257002
- Schrum, Ethan, "Clark Kerr's Early Career, Social Science, and the American University", Perspectives on the History of Higher Education 28 (2011), 193–222.
- Schrum, Ethan. The Instrumental University: Education in Service of the National Agenda after World War II. Ithaca, NY: Cornell University Press, 2019.

=== Primary sources ===
- Clark Kerr The Gold and the Blue: A Personal Memoir of the University of California, 1949–1967
- Clark Kerr The Uses of the University, 5th edition. 1963; Harvard University Press, 2001.
- Clark Kerr, John T. Dunlop, Frederick H. Harbison, and Charles A. Myers, Industrialism and Industrial Man: The Problem of Labor and Management in Economic Growth. Harvard University Press, 1960.
- "UC Won't Expel Sit-in Students", Los Angeles Times, May 6, 1964, p. 8.
- "The Arrests at Berkeley", The New York Times, December 5, 1964, p. 30.

Academic offices
New office	Chancellor of the University of California, Berkeley; 1952–1957	Succeeded by Glenn T. Seaborg
Preceded by Robert Gordon Sproul	President of the University of California; 1958–1967	Succeeded by Charles J. Hitch
