= Save the Bay =

Nonprofit organization in California, US

Save The Bay
- Founded: 1961
- Founder: Kay Kerr, Sylvia McLaughlin and Esther Gulick
- Type: Non-profit 501(c)(3)
- Purpose: Open space preservation, Natural habitat restoration, Environmental justice
- Location: Oakland, California, US
- Region served: San Francisco Bay Area
- Members: 25,000
- Key people: Executive Director David Lewis
- Website: savesfbay.org
- Formerly called: Save San Francisco Bay Association

Save the Bay is a nonprofit organization dedicated to preserving San Francisco Bay and related estuarine habitat areas. It was founded by Catherine Kerr, Sylvia McLaughlin, and Esther Gulick in 1961.

The organization aims to protect the bay from development and land reclamation by encouraging restoration to a natural state, allowing habitats such as salt flats to reform.

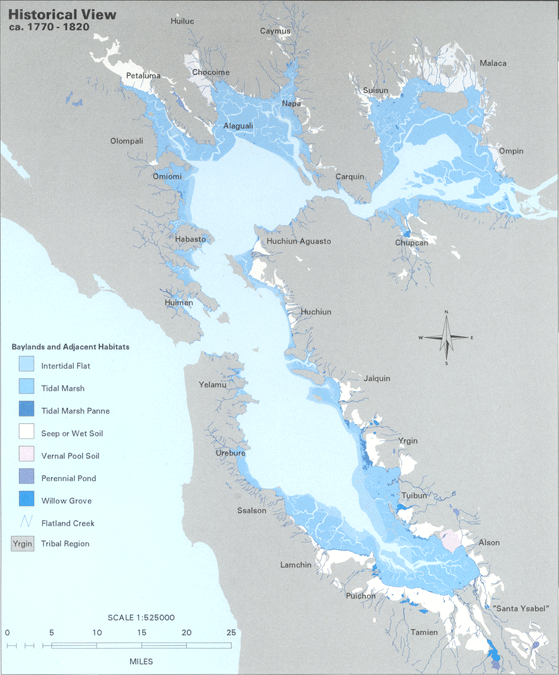
The Bay

== History ==
The organization was founded in 1961 as the Save San Francisco Bay Association by three women — Sylvia McLaughlin, Kay Kerr, and Esther Gulick — and originally began as a lobby group. In 1965, state legislation established the San Francisco Bay Conservation and Development Commission as a state agency, which the organization supported. The organization works to protect the wildlife of the Bay Area and quality of the large inland body of water. Save The Bay worked to prevent the destruction of San Bruno Mountain to fill 27 miles (44km) of the San Mateo County shoreline. This work has been noted as the first successful conservation effort in an urban area.

The organization's work led to the creation of the Bay Conservation and Development Commission, which was later used as a blueprint for other government commissions such as the Tahoe Regional Planning Agency, California Coastal Commission, and Delta Stewardship Council.

=== Plastic bag bans ===
The organization has also pushed for plastic bag bans throughout the entire region. It includes strong support for strengthening the San Francisco plastic bag ban in 2011, which banned all retailers from giving out bags made out of non-biodegradable materials. Save The Bay supported the 2012 San Jose, California, ban on plastic bags.

== See also ==
- Reber Plan
