= Frederick H. Harbison =

American economist

- Born: December 18, 1912; Sewickley, Pennsylvania
- Died: May 4, 1976 (aged 63)

Academic background
- Education: Princeton University
- Doctoral advisor: David Aloysious McCabe

Academic work
- Discipline: Labor economics
- Institutions: Princeton University; University of Chicago
- Doctoral students: Albert Rees

Frederick Harris Harbison (December 18, 1912 – April 5, 1976) was an American labor economist and Professor of Labor Economics at Princeton University. He was known for his 1959 study Management in the industrial world and other works on labor and management.

Harbison was born in Sewickley, Pennsylvania to Ralph and Helen Harbison. His father was a brick manufacturer. He obtained his AB in economics in 1934 from Princeton University, where in 1940 he obtained his PhD with a thesis on labor relations in the iron and steel industry.

In World War II Harbison served in the War Production Board, at the War Labor Board, at the Petroleum Administration for War, and at the Army Service Forces. In 1945 he started his academic career as Professor of Economics at the University of Chicago. In 1955 he moved to Princeton University, where he was Professor of Economics and International Affairs until 1976. He also served as a Member of the Organization of American States Task Force on Education, Science, and Culture in the John F. Kennedy administration in 1962. he was elected to the American Philosophical Society in 1969.

== Selected publications ==
- Harbison, Frederick Harris, and Charles Andrew Myers. Management in the industrial world: An international analysis. New York, NY: McGraw-Hill, 1959.
- Kerr, Clark, John T. Dunlop, and Frederick H. Harbison. Industrialism and industrial man: The problems of labor and management in economic growth. Cambridge, MA: Harvard University Press, 1960.
- Harbison, Frederick Harris, and Charles Andrew Myers. Education, manpower, and economic growth: Strategies of human resource development. Tata McGraw-Hill Education, 1964.
- Harbison, Frederick Harris. Human resources as the wealth of nations. Vol. 3. New York: Oxford University Press, 1973.

Articles, a selection

- Kerr, C., Harbison, F. H., Dunlop, J. T., & Myers, C. A. (1960). "Industrialism and industrial man." Int'l Lab. Rev., 82, 236.
- Harbison, Frederick, and Charles A. Myers. "Management in the industrial world." The International Executive 2.1 (1960): 9–10.'
