= International Society for Labor Law and Social Security =

The International Society for Labour and Social Security Law is an international association whose purpose is to study labour and social security law at the national and international level, to promote the exchange of ideas and information from a comparative perspective, and to encourage collaboration among academics, lawyers, and other experts within the fields of labour and social security law.

Founded in 1958, the ISLSSL is composed of national affiliates whose members are scholars, union and management lawyers, judges, government officials, arbitrators, industrial relations and human resources specialists, and others interested in promoting international exchange of ideas and information and in developing collaboration among experts in the fields of labor, employment and employee benefits law.

The current members of the Executive Committee are Steven L. Willborn (Chair), George Nicolau, Vice-Chair, and Alvin L. Goldman, Secretary-Treasurer.

The internalization of labor law and labor relations has become an increasingly significant area of focus for those involved in workplace issues. In academia, scholars study comparative labor and employment law across different legal systems. Labor unions and their legal representatives examine international dimensions of corporate campaigns designed to support union objectives, while management attorneys are increasingly called upon to advise employers on the international implications of workplace and employment policies.

== World Congress ==
The ISLSSL conducts a World Congress every three years and Regional Congresses (open to registrants from all regions) during the interim years. These meetings allow members both to combine travel with expanded understanding of how labor and employment law operate elsewhere and explain their system to others. ISLSSL conferences also facilitate development of new personal contacts and promote important scholarship, education and training in the fields of comparative and international labor law, employment law, and related fields.

In recent years, ISLSSL World Congresses were convened in Jerusalem in 2000, in Montevideo in 2003, in Paris in 2006, in Sydney, Australia in 2009 and in Santiago, Chile in 2012. A World Congress will be hosted in Cape Town, South Africa in 2015.

== Regional branches ==
The ISLSSL maintains several regional branches. Recent Western Hemisphere Regional Congresses have been held in Lima, Peru; Querétaro, Mexico; and in the Dominican Republic. Recent Asian Regional Congresses were hosted in Manilla and Taipai, and recent European Regional Congresses were held in Stockholm, Bologna, Sevilla (2011) and Dublin (2014). In addition, the U.S. Branch sponsored a one day conferences in Chicago in May 2005 and in Philadelphia in 2012.

== Publications ==
The U.S. Branch of the ISLSSL and the University of Illinois College of Law publish the Comparative Labor Law and Policy Journal, a quarterly law journal which publishes articles in the field of comparative and transnational labor and employment law. The journal publishes comparative analysis articles on labor law, employment policy, labor economics, worker migration, and social security issues. Many articles focus on legal systems in developing countries or post-colonial nations with emerging or new legal systems. The target audience for the journal is academics, practicing attorneys, policy makers, students, workers and labor movement officials and activists. The journal's stated policy is to make the publication readable and of practical value to officials in developing countries.

== See also ==
- Labor law
- Collective bargaining
- Contingent work
- Industrial relations
- Legal working age
- Child Labour
- Labour movement
- Master and Servant Act
- Right-to-work law
- Social security
- Sweat shops
- Unfair labor practice
- Union Organizer
- Vicarious liability
- Workplace Fairness
