= Labor and Worklife Program =

Program at Harvard Law School

The Labor and Worklife Program (LWP) at Harvard Law School is described as "Harvard University's forum for research and teaching on the world of work and its implications for society." The LWP grew out of the Harvard Trade Union Program (HTUP), an executive training program for labor leaders around the world that had been founded in 1942. Designed to provide a broader platform for research on transformations in the world of work, the Labor and Worklife Program was launched in September 2002 and joined the many research centers housed at Harvard Law School.

The LWP was built through the collaborative work of Harvard Law School Professor Paul C. Weiler, Harvard economist Richard B. Freeman, and former U.S. Secretary of Labor John T. Dunlop in cooperation with HTUP and LWP Executive Director Elaine Bernard. Dunlop was one of the founding fathers of the Harvard Trade Union Program and commonly regarded as the leading U.S. figure in the field of Industrial Relations. Thomas A. Kochan, professor at MIT's Sloan School of Management, said that Dunlop "was a central figure in all the national labor policy discussions that took place since World War II."

In December 2016, the LWP announced that Sharon Block, principal deputy assistant secretary for policy at the U.S. Department of Labor, would succeed Elaine Bernard as executive director of the LWP in early 2017.

The LWP features several programs and initiatives:

1. The Harvard Trade Union Program trains labor leaders from the United States and several nations around the world;
2. The Pensions and Capital Stewardship Project focuses on retirement security and corporate governance issues;
3. The Science and Engineering Workforce Project, in cooperation with the National Bureau of Economic Research, explores labor issues in science. The LWP also worked on the societal implications of nanotechnology in the twenty-first century with support from the National Nanotechnology Initiative;
4. The Jerry Wurf Memorial Fund provides support for the Union Scholars Program that helps bring education and training to young university students from underrepresented groups in the labor movement. It also provides funding for the training of labor leaders pursuing executive education programs at the Harvard Kennedy School. There is also a Jerry Wurf Memorial Lecture delivered by leading figures in labor, academe, politics, and social justice movements.
