= Comparative Labor Law and Policy Journal =

- Discipline: Law
- Language: English

Publication details
- History: 1976–present
- Publisher: University of Illinois College of Law and the International Society for Labor Law and Social Security, US Branch (USA)
- Frequency: Quarterly

Standard abbreviations
- Bluebook: Comp. Lab. L. & Pol'y J.
- ISO 4: Comp. Labor Law Policy J.

Indexing
- ISSN: 1095-6654

Links
- Journal homepage

The Comparative Labor Law and Policy Journal is a law journal which publishes articles in the field of comparative and transnational labor and employment law.

The journal was founded in 1976 at the University of Pennsylvania Law School as the Comparative Labor Law Journal. In 1997, the journal moved to the University of Illinois and rechristened the Comparative Labor Law and Policy Journal to widen its scope.

The journal publishes comparative analysis articles on labor law, employment policy, labor economics, worker migration, and social security issues. Many articles focus on legal systems in developing countries or post-colonial nations with emerging or new legal systems.

The target audience for the journal comprises academics, practicing attorneys, policy makers, students, workers and labor movement officials and activists. The journal's stated policy is to make the publication readable and of practical value to officials in developing countries.

The journal is published quarterly by the University of Illinois College of Law and the International Society for Labor Law and Social Security, US Branch.
