= National Academy of Arbitrators =

- Abbreviation: NAA
- Established: 1947; 79 years ago
- Type: Professional association
- Legal status: 501(c)(6) non-profit
- Region served: United States, Canada
- Website: naarb.org

The National Academy of Arbitrators (NAA) is a professional and honorary organization of labor and employment arbitrators in the United States and Canada. Founded in 1947, it sets membership standards, supports professional development through conferences and publications, and participates in the development of arbitration practice, including filing amicus curiae briefs in selected cases. The NAA is incorporated as a 501(c)(6) organization.

== Admission standards and membership ==
Admission to the Academy is selective, generally limited to scholars and practitioners who have made contributions to labor law and relations. The NAA’s rules prohibit members from serving as advocates or consultants in labor disputes, associating with firms performing such functions, or acting as expert witnesses on behalf of labor or management.

== Purposes and collaborations ==
The NAA actively participates as an amicus curiae in appellate litigation in the United States and Canada, addressing issues influencing the integrity of arbitration. Collaborations with various organizations and institutions in the labor-management and employment relations field have led to the establishment of a "due process protocol for arbitration", which condemns the use of mandatory pre-dispute arbitration agreements outside of the collective bargaining agreement context.

The organization's stated purposes include establishing standards of integrity and competence for professional arbitrators; ensuring adherence to the Code of Professional Responsibility for Arbitrators of Labor-Management Disputes (maintained in collaboration with the American Arbitration Association and the Federal Mediation and Conciliation Service); encouraging the study of workplace dispute arbitration; and facilitating collaboration among professionals in the field.

== Educational initiatives and annual meetings ==
The NAA does not act as an appointing authority for arbitrator selection or appointment, but supports initiatives that promote awareness and understanding of arbitration as a dispute-resolution method. It conducts an annual national convention that is open to non-members, as well as regional meetings offering educational opportunities on topics relevant to labor relations, labor arbitration, and legal ethics.

=== Becoming a Labor Arbitrator (BALA Course) ===
In 2025, the NAA assumed administration of the Becoming a Labor Arbitrator (BALA) course, previously offered by the Federal Mediation and Conciliation Service (FMCS) for over 25 years. The BALA course provides training for labor-management practitioners in labor arbitration and alternative dispute resolution, including hearing conduct, evidence evaluation, decision-writing, and professional ethics. The program combines online learning modules with live instruction and includes practical exercises such as mock hearings. Graduates may participate in a shadowing program to observe and discuss cases with NAA arbitrators and write shadow awards for critique and professional development. Since its inception, over 2,000 individuals have completed the BALA course.

=== Research and Education Foundation ===
Established in 1985, the National Academy of Arbitrators Research and Education Foundation (NAA-REF) focuses on supporting research, training, and education in labor and employment dispute resolution. It sponsors projects studying grievance procedures, arbitration processes, and the impact of law on these methods. The REF also supports educational programs, publications, and projects promoting integrity and competence in arbitration and mediation.

=== Arbitration Info website ===
The NAA, in collaboration with the Center for the Study of Dispute Resolution at the University of Missouri School of Law, created the Arbitration Info website, intended as a neutral source providing information about arbitration in the workplace. This initiative aims to serve as an educational resource for the public and journalists, refraining from generating business for specific arbitrators or arbitration practice groups. The website provides resources for the media, such as a listing of experts and arbitrators who can discuss current events involving arbitration or labor relations matters. It also houses news articles and commentary regarding arbitration.

== Publications and resources ==
For years, the Academy published its proceedings through the Bureau of National Affairs. These proceedings have been cited as influential commentary and research on arbitration in labor management relations.

Additionally, the NAA has produced two treatises: The Common Law of the Workplace: The Views of Arbitrators, edited by Theodore J. St. Antoine, and Fifty Years in the World of Work, edited by Gladys W. Gruenberg, Joyce M. Najita, and Dennis R. Nolan.

These books do not represent official NAA policy, but rather present scholarly articles with differing viewpoints. The texts emphasize that arbitrators interpret specific contracts rather than applying a universal "law of the shop."

The Academy’s official website contains resources including the Academy's history, constitution and by-laws, membership guidelines, and a directory of members.

== Bibliography ==
- St. Antoine, Theodore, ed. (2005) [1998]. The Common Law of the Workplace: The Views of Arbitrators (PDF) (2nd ed.). Washington D.C.: Bureau of National Affairs. ISBN 1-57018-540-9. Available as a free downloadable book at the National Academy of Arbitrators website.

== See also ==
- Arbitration
- Arbitration in the United States
- National Labor Relations Act
- Arnold M. Zack
