= Michael J. Piore =

American economist and professor of economics and political science

- Born: August 14, 1940 (age 86)

Academic background
- Education: Harvard University

Academic work
- Discipline: Labor economics
- School or tradition: Marxian economics
- Institutions: Massachusetts Institute of Technology

Michael Joseph Piore (born August 14, 1940) is an American economist and professor of economics and political science at the Massachusetts Institute of Technology. His research centers on labor economics, immigration, and innovation. He was awarded a MacArthur Fellowship in 1984.

Piore attended Harvard University and received a B.A. in Economics in 1962 and Ph.D. in 1966. He has been a faculty member at MIT since 1966 and has previously served as a consultant to the Department of Labor between 1968 and 1970 and labor consultant to the government of Puerto Rico between 1970 and 1972.

Piore is best known for the development of the concept of the internal labor market and the dual labour market hypothesis and, more recently, for work on the transition from mass production to flexible specialization. He has worked on a number of labor market and industrial relations problems, including low income labor markets, the impact of technological change upon work, migration, labor market segmentation and the relationship between the labor market, business strategy and industrial organization.

Piore is a member of the executive board of the Society for the Advancement of Socio-economics. He was a member of the executive committee of the American Economic Association (1990–1995), and a member of the Governing Board of the Institute for Labour Studies of the International Labour Organization (1990–1996). In addition to the ILO, Piore has worked with many other international organizations, foreign governments, U.S. government agencies, state governments, and nonprofit organizations including the NAACP Legal Defense Fund, the AFL-CIO, and the Social Science Research Council. He holds a Docteur HONORIS CAUSA from Lille University of Science and Technology.

== Publications ==
- Piore, Michael J.; Lester, Richard (2004). "Innovation – The Missing Dimension". Cambridge, Massachusetts: Harvard University Press.
- Piore, Michael J.; Paul Osterman; Thomas Kochan; Richard M. Locke (2001). Working in America: A Blueprint for the New Labor Market. Cambridge, Massachusetts: MIT Press.
- Piore, Michael J.; Yevgeni Kuznetsov; Clemente Ruiz Duran; Charles Sabel (2001). Think Globally, Act Locally: Decentralized Incentive Framework for Mexico's Private Sector Development. World Bank Informal Research Report.
- Piore, Michael J.; Mitsuhiro Kagami; John Humphery (1998). Learning, Liberalization, and Economic Adjustment. Tokyo, Japan: Institute of Developing Economies.
- Piore, Michael J.; Enrique Dussel Peters; Clemente Ruiz Duran (1997). Pensar Globalmente y Actuar Regionalmente: Hacia un Nuevo Paradigma Industrial Para el Siglo XXI. Mexico: Universidad Nacional Autónoma de México: Fundación Friedrich Ebert: Editoral Jus.
- Piore, Michael J.; Richard M. Locke; Thomas Kochan (1995). Employment Relations in a Changing World Economy. Cambridge, Massachusetts: MIT Press. ISBN 0-262-12191-3.
- Piore, Michael J. (1995). Beyond Individualism. Cambridge, Massachusetts: Harvard University Press. ISBN 0-674-06897-1.
- Piore, Michael J.; Charles Sabel (1984). The Second Industrial Divide. Basic Books. ISBN 0-465-07562-2.
- Piore, Michael J.; Suzanne Berger (1980). Dualism and Discontinuity in Industrial Society. Cambridge, UK: Cambridge University Press.
- Piore, Michael J. (1979). Unemployment and Inflation: Institutionalist and Structuralist Views. Sharpe Press. ISBN 0-87332-143-X.
- Piore, Michael J. (1979). Birds of Passage: Migrant Labor and Industrial Societies. Cambridge, UK: Cambridge University Press. ISBN 0-521-22452-7.
- Piore, Michael J.; Peter Doeringer (1971). Internal Labor Markets and Manpower Adjustment. New York: D.C. Heath and Company.
