= Labor and Employment Relations Association =

- Type: Labor relations and human resources management
- Founded: 1947
- Headquarters: Champaign, Ill., USA
- Key people: Emily E. Smith, Executive Director
- Website: http://www.leraweb.org

The Labor and Employment Relations Association (LERA) was founded in 1947 as the Industrial Relations Research Association. LERA is an organization for professionals in industrial relations and human resources. Headquartered at the School of Labor and Employment Relations at the University of Illinois at Urbana–Champaign, the organization has more than 3,000 members at the national level and in its local chapters. LERA is a non-profit, non-partisan organization that draws its members from the ranks of academia, management, labor and "neutrals" (arbitrators and mediators).

LERA's constituencies are professionals in the areas of academic research and education, compensation and benefits, human resources, labor and employment law, labor and management resources, labor markets and economics, public policy, training and development, and union administration and organizing. The executive director of LERA is Emily Smith. Past presidents of LERA include John T. Dunlop, George Shultz, and Ray Marshall, all of whom went on to serve as U.S. Secretary of Labor.

LERA encourages research into all areas of the field of labor, employment, the workplace, employer/employee organization, employment and labor relations, human resources, labor markets, income security, and the international dimensions of all of these areas. The organization takes a multi-disciplinarian approach and includes scholars from various disciplines including industrial relations, history, economics, political science, psychology, sociology, law, management, labor studies, and others.

LERA promotes full discussion and exchange of ideas between and among all of its constituencies—academic, labor, management, neutral, and government—on the planning, development and results of research in these fields, as well as its useful application in both practice and policy.

LERA is also disseminates the latest research, challenges in the field, and best practices to researchers, practitioners, and the public, by holding meetings, producing materials and publications.

The association assumes no partisan position on questions of policy in these fields, but is an open forum respecting all opinions and perspectives. The association supports fundamental worker and human rights in the workplace and supports rights of the employees, employers, and their organizations to organize.

== History ==
The organization was founded as the Industrial Relations Research Association, by labor economists in the post World War II era, who found a need to expand upon discussions taking place surrounding workplace issues. For the first 52 years of the organization, the IRRA was headquartered at the University of Wisconsin, Madison. In 1999, the organization moved its headquarters to the campus of the University of Illinois at Urbana-Champaign, and Paula Wells became the executive director. The organization was invited to make the Institute of Labor and Industrial Relations at the University of Illinois its home base, which later became known as the School of Labor and Employment Relations in 2006, with LERA past President Joel Cutcher-Gershenfeld as its first dean. LERA itself changed its own name to the Labor and Employment Relations Association in 2005, in response to many changes taking place in the field, transitioning from industrial relations to the field of labor and employment relations.

=== Past presidents ===
- 1948 Edwin E. Witte, University of Wisconsin
- 1949 Sumner H. Slichter, Harvard University
- 1950 George W. Taylor, University of Pennsylvania
- 1951 William M. Leiserson, Johns Hopkins University
- 1952 J. Douglas Brown, Princeton University
- 1953 Ewan Clague, U.S. Department of Labor
- 1954 Clark Kerr, University of California
- 1955 Lloyd G. Reynolds, Yale University
- 1956 Richard A. Lester, Princeton University
- 1957 Dale Yoder, University of Minnesota
- 1958 E. Wight Bakke, Yale University
- 1959 William Haber, University of Michigan
- 1960 John T. Dunlop, Harvard University
- 1961 Philip Taft, Brown University
- 1962 Charles A. Myers, MIT
- 1963 William F. Whyte, Cornell University
- 1964 Solomon Barkin, Textile Workers of America
- 1965 Edwin Young, University of Wisconsin
- 1966 Arthur M. Ross, University of California
- 1967 Neil W. Chamberlain, Columbia University
- 1968 George P. Shultz, University of Chicago
- 1969 Frederick H. Harbison, Princeton University
- 1970 Douglass V. Brown, MIT
- 1971 George H. Hildebrand, U.S. Department of Labor and Cornell University
- 1972 Benjamin Aaron, UCLA
- 1973 Douglas H. Soutar, Am. Smelting & Refining Co.
- 1974 Nathaniel Goldfinger, AFL-CIO
- 1975 Gerald G. Somers, University of Wisconsin
- 1976 Irving Bernstein, UCLA
- 1977 F. Ray Marshall, University of Texas
- 1978 Charles C. Killingsworth, Michigan State University.
- 1979 Jerome M. Rosow, Work in America Institute
- 1980 Jack Barbash, University of Wisconsin
- 1980 Rudolph A. Oswald, AFL-CIO
- 1982 Milton Derber, University of Illinois
- 1983 Jack Stieber, Michigan State University
- 1984 Wayne L. Horvitz, Consultant, Washington, D.C.
- 1985 Everett M. Kassalow, University of Wisconsin
- 1986 Lloyd Ulman, University of California-Berkeley
- 1987 Michael H. Moskow, Premark International
- 1988 Phyllis A. Wallace, MIT
- 1989 Joyce D. Miller, ACTWU
- 1990 Robert B. McKersie, MIT
- 1991 James L. Stern, University of Wisconsin-Madison
- 1992 Ernest J. Savoie, Ford Motor Company
- 1993 George Strauss, University of California-Berkeley
- 1994 Lynn R. Williams, United Steelworkers of America
- 1995 Walter J. Gershenfeld, Arbitrator, Flourtown, PA
- 1996 Hoyt N. Wheeler, University of South Carolina
- 1997 Francine Blau, Cornell University
- 1998 F. Donal O'Brien, Arbitrator/Mediator
- 1999 Thomas A. Kochan, MIT
- 2000 Sheldon Friedman, AFL-CIO
- 2001 Magdalena Jacobsen, FMCS
- 2002 John F. Burton Jr., Rutgers University
- 2003 Paula Voos, Rutgers University
- 2004 Marlene K. Heyser, Workplace Law Strategies
- 2005 Stephen Sleigh, IAMAW
- 2006 David Lipsky, Cornell University
- 2007 Eileen B. Hoffman, Federal Mediation and Conciliation Service
- 2008 Anthony Oliver Jr., Parker Milliken, Clark O'Hara & Samuelian
- 2009 Joel Cutcher-Gershenfeld, University of Illinois at Urbana-Champaign
- 2010 Eileen Appelbaum, Rutgers University
- 2011 Gordon Pavy, AFL-CIO
- 2012–13 David Lewin, UCLA
- 2014 Martin Mulloy, Ford Motor CO.
- 2015 Lisa M. Lynch, Brandeis University
- 2016 Bonnie Prouty Castry, Arbitrator/Mediator
- 2017 Janice R. Bellace, University of Pennsylvania
- 2018 Harry C. Katz, Cornell University
- 2019 Kris Rondeau, AFSCME
- 2020 Dennis Dabney, Kaiser Permanente
- 2021 Adrienne Eaton, Rutgers University

=== Editors ===
- Milton Derber, University of Illinois, 1948–50
- L. Reed Tripp, University of Wisconsin, 1951–56
- Gerald G. Somers, University of Wisconsin, 1957–74
- Barbara D. Dennis and James L. Stern, Univ. of Wis., 1975–77
- Barbara D. Dennis, University of Wisconsin, 1977–89
- John F. Burton Jr., Rutgers University, 1989–94
- Paula B. Voos, University of Wisconsin-Madison, 1994–2002
- Adrienne Eaton, Rutgers University, 2003–2009
- Françoise Carré and Christian Weller, University of Massachusetts Boston, 2010-2014
- Ariel Avgar, Cornell University, 2015–2019
- Ryan Lamare, University of Illinois, 2020−

=== Secretary-treasurers ===
- William H. McPherson, University of Illinois, 1948–50
- Robben W. Fleming, University of Wisconsin, 1951–53
- Edwin Young, University of Wisconsin, 1954–62
- David B. Johnson, University of Wisconsin, 1963–72
- James L. Stern (Treas.), UW-Madison, 1968–69
- Richard U. Miller, UW-Madison, 1973–77
- David R. Zimmerman, UW-Madison, 1978–1999
- Peter Feuille, University of Illinois at Urbana-Champaign, 2000–2014
- Craig Olson, University of Illinois at Urbana-Champaign, 2015–2017
- Ryan Lamare, University of Illinois at Urbana-Champaign, 2018–2019
- Andrew Weaver, University of Illinois at Urbana-Champaign, 2020–

=== Founding members ===
- Vincent W. Bladen, University of Toronto
- Eveline M. Burns, Columbia University
- Ewan Clague, U.S. Department of Labor
- Milton Derber, University of Illinois
- William Haber, University of Michigan
- Frederick H. Harbison, University of Chicago
- Vernon H. Jensen, Cornell University
- Clark Kerr, University of California-Berkeley
- Richard A. Lester, Princeton University
- William H. McPherson, University of Illinois
- C. Wright Mills, Columbia University
- Donald G. Paterson, University of Minnesota
- Sumner H. Slichter, Harvard University
- Sterling D. Spero, New York University
- George W. Taylor, University of Pennsylvania
- Francis Tyson, University of Pittsburgh
- William F. Whyte, University of Chicago
- W. Willard Wirtz, Northwestern University
- Edwin E. Witte, University of Wisconsin
- Harry D. Wolf, University of North Carolina
- Dale Yoder, University of Minnesota

=== Charter members (affiliation at time became member) ===
- Benjamin Aaron, Arbitrator, Los Angeles
- Leonard P. Adams, Cornell University
- Gabriel N. Alexander, Arbitrator, Detroit
- (Mrs.) Jack Barbash, Amalgamated Meat Cutters and Butcherworkmen of NA
- Solomon Barkin, Textile Workers
- Irving Bernstein, UCLA
- Seymour Brandwein, Bureau of National Affairs
- George W. Brooks, Washington, DC
- Neil W. Chamberlain, Yale University
- Jesse C. Clamp Jr., Florida State University
- Bernard Cushman, Labor Bureau of Middle West
- Edward L. Cushman, Wayne University
- G. Allan Dash Jr., Arbitrator, Philadelphia
- John T. Dunlop, Harvard University
- Milton T. Edelman, University of Illinois
- Marten S. Estey, Cornell University
- Tracy H. Ferguson, Esq., Syracuse
- Joseph P. Goldberg, Jt. Congressional Comm. on Labor-Mgmt. Relations
- Lois S. Gray, Cornell University
- Einar J. Hardin, University of Minnesota
- James J. Healy, Harvard University
- Peter Henle, American Federation of Labor
- Morris A. Horowitz, University of Illinois
- Harriet D. Hudson, University of Illinois
- Arthur T. Jacobs, USNA, New York
- Howard W. Johnson, University of Chicago
- Jacob J. Kaufman, University of Toledo
- Clark Kerr, University of California-Berkeley
- Charles C. Killingsworth, Michigan State College
- Forrest H. Kirkpatrick, Bethany College
- Milton R. Konvitz, Cornell University
- Richard A. Lester, Princeton University
- Solomon B. Levine, University of Illinois
- Kenneth M. McCaffree, University of Washington
- Frederic Meyers, University of Texas
- James G. Miller, Cornell University
- John W. Miller Jr., Ford Motor Co.
- Charles A. Myers, Massachusetts Institute of Technology
- Maurice F. Neufeld, Cornell University
- Herbert R. Northrup, Columbia University
- Lloyd G. Reynolds, Yale University
- Milton Rubin, War Labor Board
- Stanley H. Ruttenberg, Congress of Indus. Organizations
- Sidney W. Salsburg, University of Wisconsin
- Arthur W. Saltzman, Syracuse University
- Richard Scheuch, Princeton University
- Rosalind S. Schulman, Indus. Union of Marine and Shipbuilding Workers-CIO
- Boaz Siegel, Wayne University
- Ruth S. Spitz, Ohio State University
- Arthur Stark, New York State Board of Mediation
- Jack Stieber, United Steelworkers of America
- Ralph I. Thayer, Washington State College
- Lloyd Ulman, Harvard University
- Martin Wagner, Louisville Labor-Mgmt. Comm.
- Morris Weisz, Bureau of Labor Statistics
- Donald J. White, Boston College
- William F. Whyte, Cornell University
- John P. Windmuller, Cornell University
- Fred Witney, Indiana University
- David A. Wolff, Arbitrator, Ann Arbor
- Henry S. Woodbridge, American Optical Co.
- David Ziskind, Esq., Los Angeles

== Employment Policy Research Network ==
At the 2011 January annual meeting, LERA launched the Employment Policy Research Network (EPRN). It originally consisted of about 100 researchers (economists; management, human resources, and labor relations researchers; attorneys, historians and sociologists) from 30 universities, including California-Berkeley, Columbia, Cornell, Illinois, Massachusetts (several campuses), MIT, Michigan, Michigan State, Northeastern, Rutgers, Stanford and UCLA, as well as universities in Canada and the United Kingdom. In March, 2011, the first cohort of doctoral students from MIT and Cornell joined EPRN as graduate student researchers who are sponsored by EPRN researchers. As of May 1, 2011, there were 125 EPRN researchers from 50 universities.

EPRN received start-up funding from the Rockefeller Foundation and Russell Sage Foundation. The EPRN principal investigator is Thomas A. Kochan, George Maverick Bunker Professor of Management at MIT's Sloan School of Management and co-director of both the MIT Workplace Center and the Institute for Work and Employment Research.

EPRN is an employment research repository and virtual collaboration space whose mission is to replace ideology and partisan rhetoric with facts and objective, evidence-based research in discussions of U.S. employment, work and labor. EPRN's goal is to provide the data, research, policy proposals and reasoning to improve national and state employment laws, policies and practices. Ultimately, EPRN realizing its mission means to contribute to healthier and more productive lives of American workers and their families, to promote general economic prosperity and to enable the nation to compete successfully in the global economy. Like LERA, its parent organization, EPRN is non-profit and non-partisan.

EPRN divides the large subject of employment and work into 15 topics and research clusters of 20–40 researchers:

- Employment regulations
- Equal employment opportunity
- Globalization, employment and labor Standards
- Immigration
- Industry studies/strategies
- Labor and employment law
- Labor force demographics/supply
- Labor–management relations
- Regional economic development/adjustment
- Skills, work and technology
- Social insurance
- Unemployment – jobs deficit/growth
- Workers' compensation

== Publications ==
LERA publishes a number of research reports and books, as well as an annual research volume, an annual proceedings of LERA meetings, an electronically distributed newsletter, and an online membership directory. It also publishes the biannual journal, Perspectives on Work. The LERA Labor and Employment Law Section publishes a quarterly electronic newsletter as well.

- Perspectives on Work Magazine
- LERA Annual Research Volume
- Proceedings of the Annual Meetings
- LERA eBulletin
- LERA Labor and Employment Law Newsletter (LEL News)

== Administration and organization ==
=== Administrative staff and directors ===
- 1947–1967: No administrative staff (LERA's Secretary-Treasurer had an administrative assistant.)
- 1967–1982: Elizabeth Gulesserian, Executive Assistant to the IRRA
- 1982–1999: Kay Hutchinson, Administrator of the IRRA
- 1999–2012: Paula D. Wells, Executive Director, IRRA/LERA
- 2012–2015: Eric Duchinsky, Executive Director, LERA
- 2015–Present: Emily E. Smith, Executive Director, LERA

=== Membership ===
LERA organizational members include unions, management schools, universities, academic schools and departments, law firms and institutes. Individual members come from the ranks of academe, labor, management and neutrals. The organization provides professional development for human resource professionals, union members, corporate and non-profit managers; national, state and local government employees; arbitrators and mediators; labor attorneys and others.

LERA meets each year in May/June (LERA Annual Meeting), and participates with 18 sessions (LERA@ASSA Meeting) as part of the Allied Social Science Associations the first week of January each year.

In 2018, LERA held the LERA 70th Annual Meeting, in Baltimore, MD, at the Hilton Baltimore, June 14–17, 2018. Our LERA 71st Annual Meeting, June 13–16, 2019 will take place in Cleveland, Ohio at the Westin Cleveland Downtown.

=== Awards ===
LERA offers a number of awards, recognitions and grants each year. Its most prestigious award is the John T. Dunlop Scholar Award. Two Dunlop Scholar Awards are given each year. One goes to an academic who makes the best contribution to international and/or comparative labor and employment research. A second award recognizes an academic for research that addresses an industrial relations/employment problem of national significance in the United States. Other awards include:

- Thomas A. Kochan and Stephen R. Sleigh Best Dissertation Award
- Chapter Merit Awards, Outstanding Chapter, and Chapter Star Awards
- LERA Fellows
- Lifetime Achievement Award
- James G. Scoville Best International Paper Award
- John T. Dunlop Scholar Awards
- LERA Outstanding Practitioner Awards
- Susan C. Eaton Scholar-Practitioner Award
- Susan C. Eaton Scholar-Practitioner Grant
- Kenneth May Media Award
- Myron Taylor Management Award

== See also ==
- List of human resource management associations
