= Mary Lou Song =

Korean-American entrepreneur

Mary Lou Song is a Korean-American entrepreneur and was eBay's third employee. She joined the company, formerly AuctionWeb, in 1996 after being recruited by its founder Pierre Omidyar and Jeffrey Skoll.

== Career ==
Song graduated from Northwestern University's Medill School of Journalism with a B.S. in Journalism and from Stanford University with a M.A. in Media Studies.

=== eBay ===
In his book "The Perfect Store: Inside eBay," Adam Cohen recounts the conversation between Song and Skoll, who she met at a Stanford Business School party. At the time, Song was working for a public relations firm, but agreed to have lunch with Skoll and Omidyar. Song agreed to come on-board and was tasked with "bringing mainstream media attention" to the site. Additionally, she managed the company's public relations and community and product management teams. During the early days at eBay, Song is also credited with building the platform's community, tools and strategy to grow from 15,000 members to 20 million.

==== Friendster ====
Song joined Friendster, a social networking company, after a six-year stint at eBay. She was brought on as the Director of Community Development with the responsibility of managing its user base.

==== Tokoni ====
Labeled as a story sharing platform, Tokoni was founded in 2007 by Song and her husband, Alex Kazim. The company closed its doors in 2010.
