= Neal Bermas =

American businessman

- Education: Brandeis University
- Occupations: Businessperson; hospitality consultant; lecturer
- Known for: Founder of Streets International

Neal Bermas is an American businessperson, hospitality and management consultant, and philanthropist who founded and oversees the non-profit organization, Streets International in Hội An, Vietnam. As part of the organization, Bermas runs a restaurant, culinary tours and training program that provides disadvantaged youths with experience and job prospects in the culinary and hospitality industries. During his previous career in business, he held various executive roles and managed his own consultancy firm with clients including Sheraton, Disney and Le Méridien. He was also a lecturer at New York University and the Institute of Culinary Education.

== Early life and education ==
Neal Bermas is a native of New York City. In 1981, he earned his PhD in social policy and management from Brandeis University's Heller School for Social Policy and Management.

== Career ==
Bermas began his career in the 1980s with Ernst & Young as the national director of health care productivity services. Over the course of the next two decades, he held various roles including president of the Forbes Vantage Group, president of Bogner of America, and principal at Coopers & Lybrand (now PricewaterhouseCoopers). During that time, he also managed his own New York-based hospitality and management consulting firm, Bermas Associates. With Bermas Associates, he advised a number of notable corporate clients including Sheraton, Disney, Le Méridien, and the Union Square Hospitality Group. In the 2000s, he began teaching management courses at the University of Southern California and subsequently food studies and hospitality management courses at New York University and the Institute of Culinary Education.

In 2007, Bermas incorporated the non-profit organization, Streets International, in New York with co-founder Sondra Stewart. With the Institute of Culinary Education, Bermas developed an 18-month culinary, hospitality and English language curriculum for the Streets International program that would involve classroom study and firsthand work experience at the Streets Restaurant Café in Hội An, Vietnam. The restaurant and training program officially opened in 2009. The goal of the program is to help disadvantaged youths find work in the culinary and hospitality sectors. In 2018, Bermas was listed as one of that year's CNN Heroes for his continued work with Streets International.

Bermas has also served in various board positions including for the Heller School for Social Policy and Management and Streets International. He is also an honorary member in Vietnam to Confrérie de la Chaîne des Rôtisseurs.
