= David Victor =

David Victor may refer to:

- David G. Victor, professor of innovation and public policy
- David Victor (screenwriter), American producer and screenwriter
