= Compensation & Benefits Review =

- Discipline: Labor relations
- Language: English
- Edited by: Phillip Bryant

Publication details
- Former name: Compensation Review
- History: 1969-present
- Publisher: SAGE Publications
- Frequency: Quarterly

Standard abbreviations
- ISO 4: Compens. Benefits Rev.

Indexing
- ISSN: 0886-3687 (print); 1552-3837 (web)
- LCCN: 86641110
- OCLC no.: 173437886

Links
- Journal homepage; Online access; Online archive

Compensation & Benefits Review is a bimonthly peer-reviewed academic journal that covers in the field of labor relations. The editor-in-chief is Phillip Bryant (Columbus State University). It was established in 1969 and is currently published by SAGE Publications.

== Abstracting and Indexing ==
Compensation & Benefits Review is abstracted and indexed in:

- Business Source Elite
- Business Source Premier
- NISC
- Sociological Abstracts
- TOPICsearch
