= Perspectives on Work =

- Language: English

Publication details
- History: 1997 to present
- Publisher: Labor and Employment Relations Association (United States)
- Frequency: Annual

Standard abbreviations
- ISO 4: Perspect. Work

Indexing
- ISSN: 1534-9276

Links
- Journal homepage

Perspectives on Work is an annual publication of the Labor and Employment Relations Association (LERA).

Perspectives on Work was founded in 1997 and is published annually. The magazine is based in Champaign, Illinois. It was published biannually until 2009. It contains news about LERA activities as well as scholarly articles on workplace law, economics and human resources (HR) from both an HR perspective as well as labor relations.

The publication covers a variety of labor relations topics, including law, workplace culture, labor history, the effect of economic dislocation and change on employer-employee relations, corporate governance, workplace sociology and leadership, and other issues. The target audience is academics and practitioners in labor and employment relations from both a managerial and worker perspective.

Perspectives on Work also includes news articles and reports about LERA activities and professional development offerings, as well as book reviews.
