= Olivier De Schutter =

Legal academic and human rights expert

Baron Olivier De Schutter
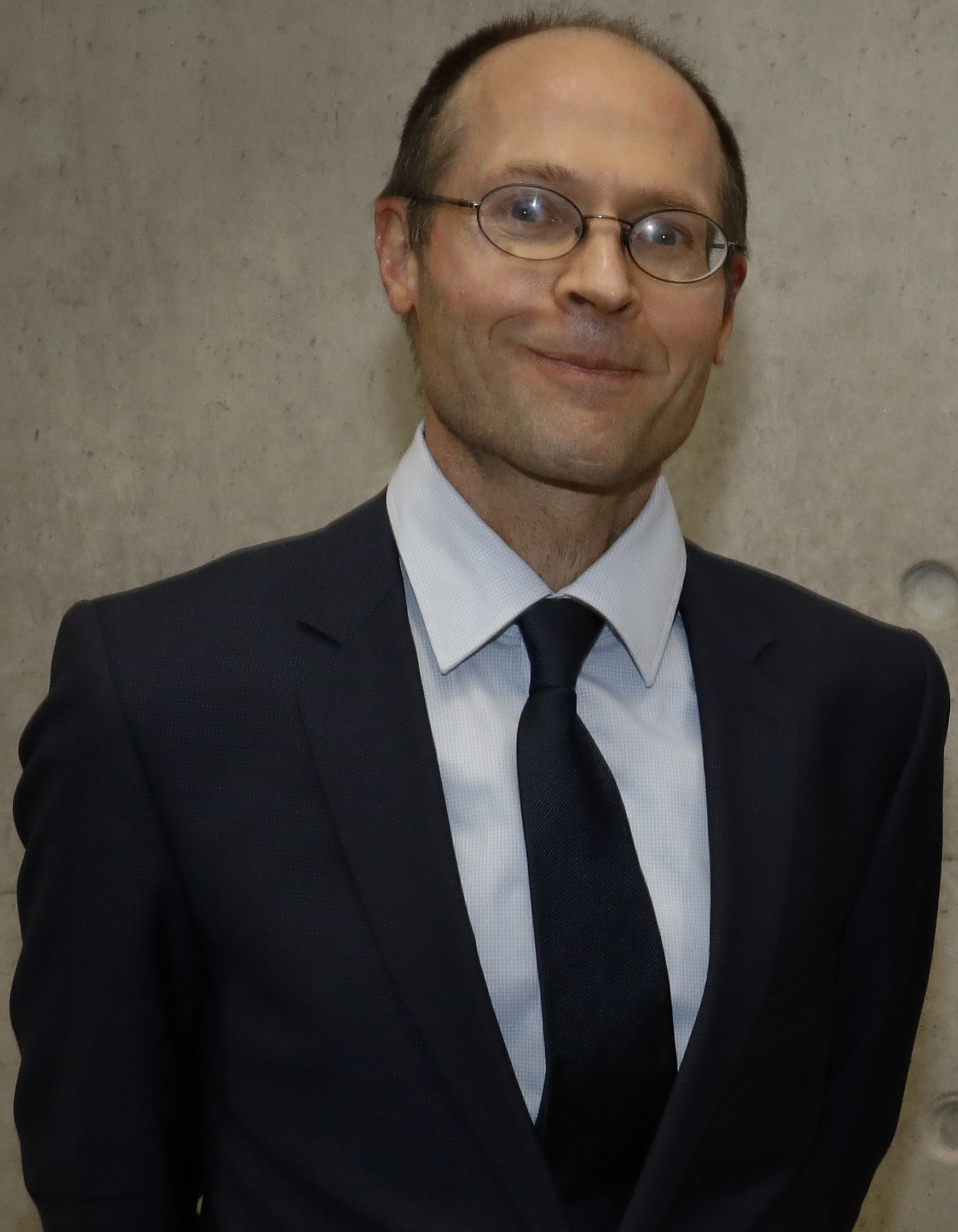
- De Schutter in 2019
- Born: 20 July 1968 (age 57)
- Occupations: Legal scholar specialising in economic and social rights
- Known for: United Nations Special Rapporteur on the right to food United Nations Special Rapporteur on Extreme Poverty and Human Rights

Olivier De Schutter (born 20 July 1968) is a Belgian legal scholar specialising in economic and social rights, with a specific focus on the role of social rights in the fight against poverty and their status in European integration: he coined the term "the Social Constitution of Europe" to describe the role of the European Social Charter on the European continent. He served as the United Nations Special Rapporteur on the right to food from 2008 to 2014. He is a professor of international human rights law, European Union law and legal theory at the University of Louvain (UCLouvain) in Louvain-la-Neuve, Belgium, as well as at the College of Europe and at Sciences Po in Paris. He was a regular visiting professor at Columbia University between 2008 and 2012 and has regularly contributed to the American University Washington College of Law's Academy on Human Rights and Humanitarian Law. He is the first chair of the Belgian Advisory Council on Policy Coherence for Development and he co-chairs the International Panel of Experts on Sustainable Food Systems (IPES-Food), a group of experts from various disciplines and regions who work together towards developing proposals for food systems reform. A Member of the UN Committee on Economic, Social and Cultural Rights between 2015 and 2020, he was appointed the UN Special Rapporteur on extreme poverty and human rights, and took up his functions on May 1, 2020.

== Background ==
The son of a diplomat, his primary and high school education took place in Bombay (now Mumbai), India; Jeddah, Saudi Arabia; and Kigali, Rwanda. He studied law at the University of Louvain (UCLouvain), Panthéon-Assas University and Harvard University, before obtaining a Ph.D. from the UCLouvain. His doctoral thesis, a comparative study of the role of courts in fundamental rights adjudication, was published in French as Fonction de juger et droits fondamentaux. Transformation du contrôle juridictionnel dans les ordres juridiques américain et européens, Bruxelles, Bruylant, 1999, 1164 pp. His subsequent publications are in the areas of governance and human rights, with a particular focus on the issue of globalization and human rights and economic and social rights more generally, and on the protection of fundamental rights in the European Union. Among his books on human rights are International Human Rights Law. Cases, Materials, Commentary, initially published by Cambridge University Press in 2010 and which went through a second and third, revised editions in 2014 and 2019. He also published extensively on economic globalization and human rights, most notably advocating in favor of improving linkages between trade policies and labour rights and environmental standards (Trade in the Service of Sustainable Development, Hart/Bloomsbury, 2015) and making proposals for a more sustainable and democratic governance of natural resources, such as land and water (Governing Access to Essential Resources, Columbia Univ. Press, 2016, co-edited with K. Pistor; and Foreign Direct Investment and Human Development, Routledge, 2012, co-edited with J.F. Swinnen and J. Wouters).

In his work, he seeks to link the human rights principles of participation, accountability, and non-discrimination, with the idea of learning-based public policies, that are permanently tested and revised in the light of their impact on the poorest and the most vulnerable. His current work focuses on transition towards sustainable societies, in which he mobilizes various disciplines including economics, social psychology, political science, and feminist theory.

Since the mid-1990s, De Schutter has been involved in various capacities in the debates on improving governance in the EU, and on fundamental rights in the EU. In 1995–1997, he co-organized a seminar on reforming governance in the EU with the Forward Studies Unit of the European Commission, a seminar that later, following the fall of the Santer Commission, was influential in shaping the White Paper on Governance published in July 2001 by the European Commission. Between 2002 and 2007, he coordinated the EU Network of Independent Experts on Fundamental Rights, a high-level group of experts established at the request of the European Parliament to provide recommendations to the EU institutions on the implementation of the EU Charter of Fundamental Rights and to report on the situation of fundamental rights in the EU. In 2013, he was appointed a member of the EU's Fundamental Rights Agency's Scientific Committee.

His key proposals for the introduction of a learning-based governance in the EU, building on local social innovations to accelerate the shift to sustainable societies and thus to support the ecological and social transition, are summarized in a report he presented at the 2014 International Francqui Conference . His views were strongly influenced by democratic experimentalism, as promoted by Roberto M. Unger, a Harvard Law School professor under whom De Schutter studied, and Charles F. Sabel, a Columbia Law School colleague with whom he co-taught a seminar on governance in the EU during a few years. To democratic experimentalism as exposed by Unger or Sabel, De Schutter adds an emphasis on social innovations originating within communities in which sufficient social capital is present to allow for collective action to develop. In that sense, sociodiversity—the proliferation of social innovations, often at local level and linked to local resources and motivations—is seen as a key asset to build resilient and sustainable societies, and governance should support such innovations. The implication is a radical view about democracy: rather than democracy being just a characteristic of the political system, it should be a characteristic of society as a whole, and rather than democracy being about the "People" electing representatives to design solutions for them, it should mean creating space for people to invent their own solutions to surmount the obstacles they face.

This view is the main theme of a book he co-authored with Tom Dedeurwaerdere, Social Innovation in the service of Social and Ecological Transformation. The rise of the Enabling State (Routledge, 2022), in which he explores how the State can support local communities to build their own solutions to the challenges they face, without crowding out citizens-led initiatives. It also permeates his interpretation of food sovereignty, as being primarily about food democracy and the ability for people to invent alternatives to the mainstream food system . It also guides his role within IPES-Food, the International Panel of Experts on sustainable food systems : IPES-Food seeks to develop proposals for food systems reform by involving social actors and building on social innovations, in a transdisciplinary demarche that unlocks obstacles to reform by democratizing food systems and squarely addressing political economy issues delaying change—vested interests, dominant narratives, and economic and political monopolies.

== United Nations Special Rapporteur ==
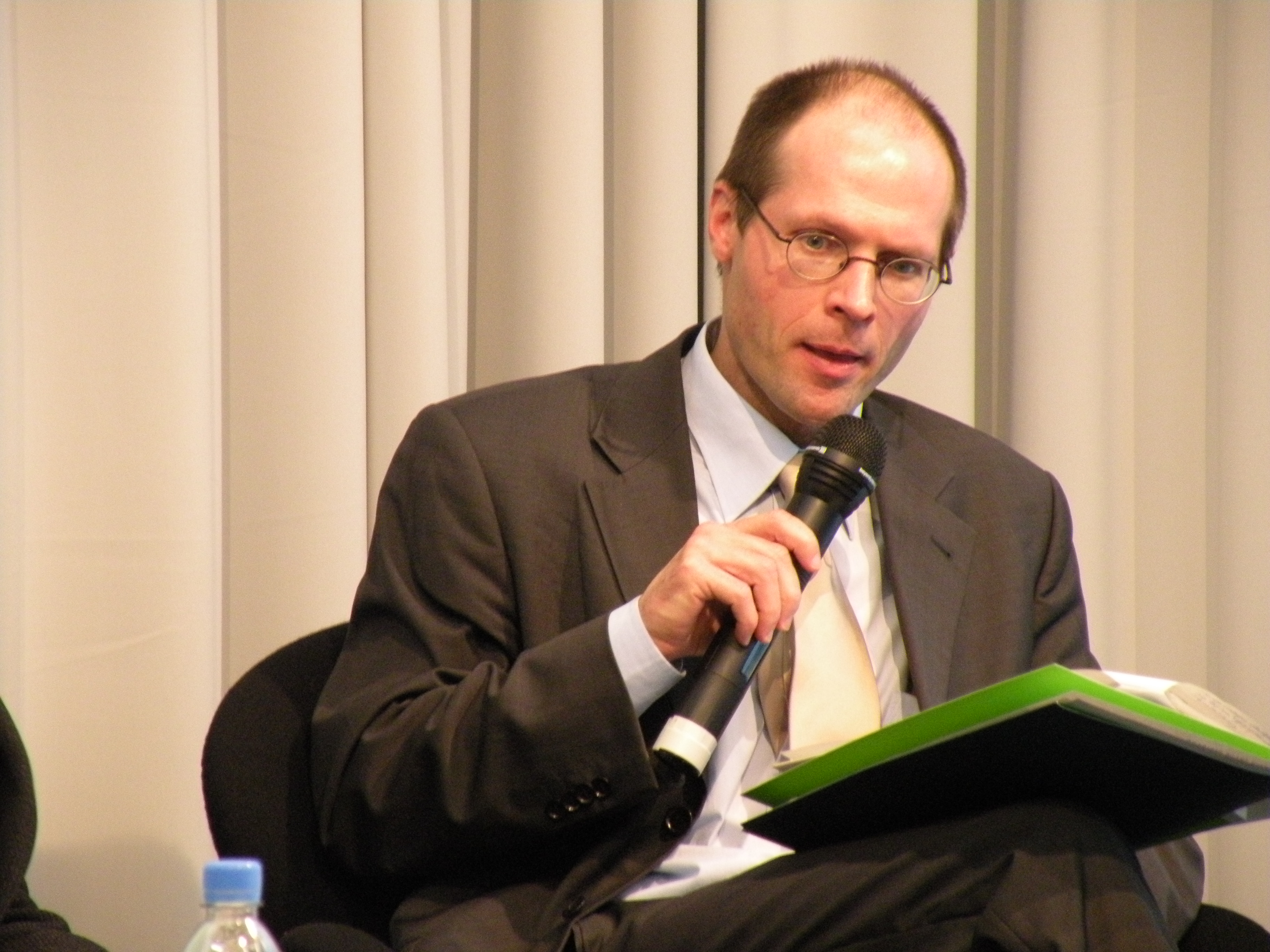
Olivier De Schutter in 2010

As the United Nations Special Rapporteur on the right to food, De Schutter successed Jean Ziegler, who had held the office from 2000 to 2008. De Schutter presented reports to the UN Human Rights Council and to the UN General Assembly on various aspects of the right to food. He also conducts official visits that lead to reports being prepared to the attention of the governments concerned and to the international community: such missions took place, inter alia, in Benin, Brazil, Cameroon, China, Guatemala, Madagascar, Mexico, Nicaragua, South Africa and Syria. Although he worked mainly in developing countries, he also took interest in advanced economies such as Canada, conducting an 11-day formal investigation in Canada during 2012. As Special Rapporteur he has released official reports on agroecology, nutrition, contract farming, fisheries, gender and other key issues tied to securing the right to food, and throughout has advocated the need for smallholder farmers to be at the centre of food security strategies, and urged countries to reinvest in their agricultural sectors rather than rely on imports from volatile world markets. He has also been critical of large-scale land acquisitions and biofuel production in food insecure countries. A summary of his conclusions is provided in his final report to the UN Human Rights Council .

De Schutter was featured in Marie-Monique Robin's 2012 documentary Crops of the Future, where his encouraging study of agro-ecology and the solutions to our planet's food crisis is presented.

Between 2015 and 2020, Olivier De Schutter was a member of the UN Committee on Economic, Social and Cultural Rights, an expert body tasked with the supervision of the International Covenant on Economic, Social and Cultural Rights. The committee meets for three sessions each year, receiving country reports and assessing individual communications under an Optional Protocol that entered into force in May 2013.

In his capacity of UN Special Rapporteur on extreme poverty and human rights, Olivier De Schutter presented an initial report on how to combat poverty within planetary boundaries, making the case for a "just transition" as part of "building back better" after the Covid-19-induced economic crisis. His subsequent reports focused on the inter-generational transmission of poverty, highlighting discrimination against people in poverty and insufficient investment in early childhood as key factors explaining the perpetuation of poverty. He also worked extensively on the obstacles to the adoption by all countries of social protection floors, advocating since 2012 on the need to establishing a new international financing facility to that effect, called the Global Fund for Social Protection and dedicating a report to the issue of the "non-take-up of rights" in the field of social protection.

Olivier De Schutter maintained that autumn 2022 was the wrong time for the UK to bring more austerity. This may violate international human rights obligations and worsen hunger and malnutrition. De Schutter maintained that he was "extremely troubled" by probable multibillion-pound spending cuts which may include reductions in welfare payments for millions of the poorest in the UK:

"You do not impose austerity measures when the whole population is facing a cost of living crisis. What you do is you raise taxes on the rich, you raise taxes on corporations".

Olivier de Schutter fears poor children will eat less and will be malnourished, which will prevent them learning at school.

== International Federation for Human Rights ==
Before being appointed the UN Special Rapporteur on the right to food, De Schutter was the General Secretary of the International Federation for Human Rights, an international human rights non-governmental organisation based in Paris focused on the issue of globalization and human rights (2004–2008).

== Distinctions ==
In 2013, Olivier De Schutter was awarded the prestigious Francqui Prize, in recognition of his contributions to the theory of governance, EU law, and international and European human rights law. He was awarded the James Beard Foundation Leadership Award in 2018, for his work on food systems reform.

== Filmography ==
- BBC Horizon: "How Many People Can Live on Planet Earth" m27s19~m28s35 (Dec 2009), with David Attenborough
- Tomorrow (Demain): intervention in themes of agriculture and alimentation rights. (2015, Cyril Dion et Melanie Laurent)
- Seeds of Profits (2019, Linda Bendali)
- Bénin Europe gagnant-gagnant : "negative effect of Economical Partnership Agreement (Accords de Partenariat Économique (APE)) with Europe for West African countries" m39s45~m42s00 (2020, Mathieu Soudais)
