= United Workers Movement NMI =

The United Workers Movement-NMI is an organization in the Commonwealth of the Northern Mariana Islands devoted to fighting for workers rights in the CNMI and helping workers improve their status.

They are currently involved in rallies and activities focused on ensuring that legal alien workers have legal status after November 28, 2009 when the US federal government takes over immigration and labor in the CNMI.
