= Jack Barbash =

20th-century labor economist

Jack Barbash (1910–1994) was a labor economist best known for helping negotiate the merger of the Congress of Industrial Organizations (CIO) back into the American Federation of Labor (AFL) to form the AFL–CIO in 1955.

== Background ==
Jack Barbash was born on August 1, 1910, in Brooklyn, New York, the son of Louis Barbash and Rose Titel. In 1932, he received a BS and in 1937 MA, both in economics, from New York University.

== Career ==
Barbash worked as an investigator for the New York State Department of Labor (1937–1939) and economist for the National Labor Relations Board (1939–1940). In Washington, D.C., he worked for various unions and government agencies, including the US Office of Education (1940–1945), the War Production Board (1943–1945), and the Labor Department's Bureau of Labor Statistics (1945–1949). He also worked as research and education director for the Amalgamated Meat Cutters union (AMC) of Chicago (1948–1949). He then became staff director (1949–1953) of a subcommittee on labor-management relations on the US Senate's Labor Committee (currently called the United States Senate Committee on Health, Education, Labor and Pensions).

In 1953, Barbash joined the CIO's legal department as an economist and worked closely with Arthur J. Goldberg, the CIO's general counsel, in negotiating the CIO to rejoin the AFL in 1955. Thereafter, Barbash served as director of research and education at the AFL–CIO.

In 1957, Barbash became a professor of economics and industrial relations at the University of Wisconsin–Madison, where he taught for 24 years before retiring as the John P. Bascom Professor Emeritus of Economics and Industrial Relations in 1981.

== Personal life and death ==
On May 27, 1934, Barbash married Kate Hubelbauk; they had three children. Son Fred Barbash became national editor of the Washington Post.

Barbash headed the Industrial Relations Research Association, International Industrial Relations Research Association, Labor and Employment Relations Association, and the Association for Evolutionary Economics. He also headed the University of Wisconsin's branch of the American Association of University Professors (AAU) (1970–1971).

Jack Barbash died age 83 on May 21, 1994, of a heart attack in Madison, Wisconsin, where he had been living since 1957.

== Recognition ==
- Teaching Excellence Award (University of Wisconsin-Madison)

== Works ==
Barbash's works include:

Books

- Apprenticeship Admittance Requirements in Trade Unions in New York City (1936)
- Labor Unions in Action: A Study of the Mainsprings of Unionism (1948)
- Unions and Telephones: The Story of the Communications Workers of America (1952)
- Taft–Hartley Act in action, 1947 ... 1954, and Essential of a New Labor Policy (1954)
- Universities and Unions in Workers' Education (1955)
- Practice of Unionism (1956)
- Taft–Hartley Act in Action, 1947 ... 1956, and Essential of a New Labor Policy (1956)
- Labor Movement in the United States (1958)
- Unions and Union Leadership: Their Human Meaning (1959)
- Labor's Grass Root's: A Study of the Local Union (1961)
- Labor Movement: A Re-Examination; A Conference in Honor of David J. Saposs, January 14–15, 1966 (editor) (1966)
- American Unions: Structure, Government and Politics (1967)
- Industrial Order and the Tensions of Work (1971)
- Trade Unions and National Economic Policy (1972)
- Job Satisfaction Attitudes Surveys (1976)
- Trade Unionism in the United States: A Symposium in Honor of Jack Barbash, April 24–26, 1981 (1981)
- Work Ethic: A Critical Analysis (1983)
- Elements of Industrial Relations (1984)
- The Elements of Industrial Relations (1985)
- Theories and Concepts in Comparative Industrial Relations (1989)

Articles

- "A department to protect workers' equity" (1988)
- "John R. Commons: pioneer of labor economics" (1989)
