= Committee on Degrees in Social Studies =

Committee at Harvard University

At Harvard University, the Committee on Degrees in Social Studies is a committee that runs the honors-only, interdisciplinary concentration in social science subjects for undergraduate students. Founded in 1960, it reflects the belief that the study of the social world requires an integration of the disciplines of history, political science, sociology, economics, anthropology, and philosophy. All students are required to complete a senior thesis.

== Founders ==
- Stanley Hoffmann, an authority on international relations;
- Alexander Gerschenkron, an eminent economic historian;
- H. Stuart Hughes, a specialist in European intellectual history;
- Barrington Moore Jr., a political sociologist writing about Soviet society and revolutions;
- Robert Paul Wolff, a student of political and social theory, who became head tutor for the first year of the program

== Chairs ==
- Stanley Hoffman 1960s
- Michael Walzer 1970s
- David S. Landes 1981–1993
- Charles Maier 1993–1997
- Seyla Benhabib 1997–2001
- Grzegorz Ekiert 2001–2006
- Richard Tuck 2006–2015
- James Kloppenberg 2015–2018
- Eric Beerbohm 2018–2023
- David Armitage 2023–present

== Notable alumni ==
- Charles Sabel, MacArthur Fellow and political economist at Columbia University, 1969
- Chuck Schumer, senior U.S. Senator from New York and current Senate Majority Leader, 1971
- E.J. Dionne, Washington Post columnist, 1973
- Mickey Kaus, journalist, blogger, and 2010 Senate candidate, 1973
- Merrick B. Garland, Attorney General of the United States, 1974
- Mark Whitaker, former Editor of Newsweek, 1979
- Adam Cohen, journalist and author, 1984
- Michael Kremer, developmental economist, winner of the Nobel Memorial Prize in Economics, 1985
- Dean Norris, actor, 1985
- Dean Wareham, musician (Galaxie 500, Luna), 1985
- Tom Morello, musician (Rage Against the Machine, The Nightwatchman, Audioslave) and The E Street Band, 1986
- Bill Ackman, American investor and hedge fund manager, CEO of Pershing Square Capital Management, 1988
- Diana Paulus, artistic director of the American Repertory Theater, 1988
- Lucy H. Koh, federal judge, 1990
- Ben Mezrich, author, 1991
- Joshua Redman, jazz musician, 1991
- Jason Furman, Chairman of President Barack Obama's Council of Economic Advisors (CEA), 1992
- Ajit Pai, Chairman of the FCC, 1994
- Emily Chang, the anchor and executive producer of Bloomberg Technology, 2002
- Holden Karnofsky, co-founder of GiveWell and Open Philanthropy, 2003
- Nithya Raman, Indian-born US politician, 2003.
