= Thomas Anton Kochan =

American professor (born 1947)

Thomas A. Kochan
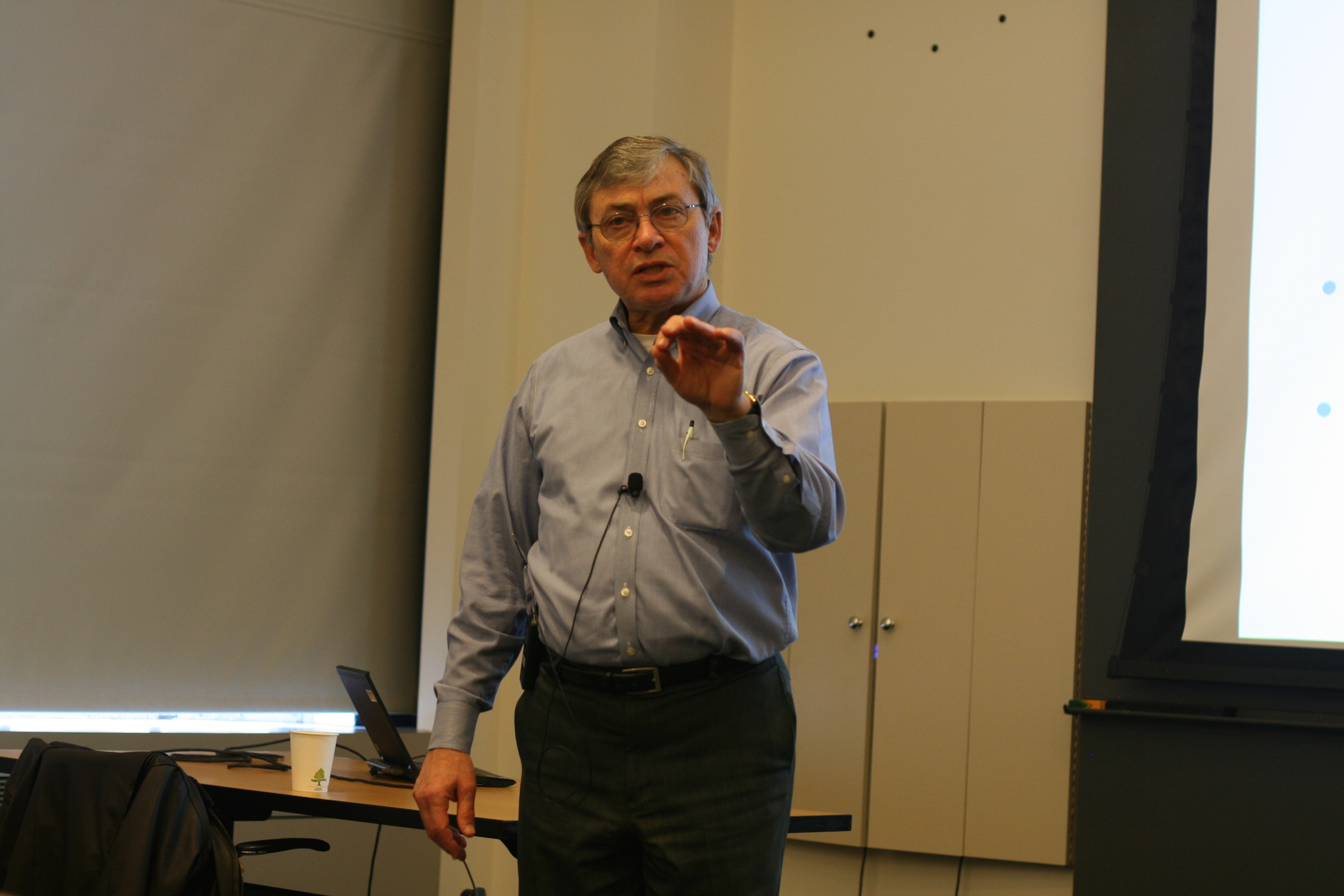
- Thomas A. Kochan
- Born: September 28, 1947 (age 79)
- Education: B.B.A., University of Wisconsin, 1969; M.S., Industrial Relations, University of Wisconsin, 1971; Ph.D., Industrial Relations, University of Wisconsin, 1973

Thomas A. Kochan (born September 28, 1947) is a professor of industrial relations, work and employment. He is the George Maverick Bunker Professor of Management at the MIT Sloan School of Management, where he has been a faculty member since 1980.

He is author of the books Restoring the American Dream: A Working Families' Agenda for America and Shaping the Future of Work.

In 2010, Kochan led the formation of the Employment Policy Research Network (EPRN), an online think tank on the subject of employment, a project of the Labor and Employment Relations Association, supported by the Rockefeller and Russell Sage foundations. The EPRN web site launched in January 2011 with 100 researchers from 35 universities, including MIT, Harvard, California-Berkeley, Columbia, Cornell, Illinois, Michigan State, Pennsylvania State University and UCLA.

He served as chair of the MIT faculty from 2009 to 2011. He came to MIT in 1980 as a professor of industrial relations. From 1988 to 1991 he served as head of the behavioral and policy sciences area in the Sloan School.

He has served as a third-party mediator, fact finder, and arbitrator and as a consultant to a variety of government and private sector organizations and labor-management groups.

He was a consultant for one year to the Secretary of Labor in the Department of Labor's Office of Policy Evaluation and Research.

Kochan focuses on the need to update America's work and employment policies, institutions, and practices to catch up with a changing workforce and economy. Through empirical research, he demonstrates that fundamental changes in the quality of work and employment relations are needed to address America's critical problems in industries ranging from healthcare to airline to manufacturing.

== Education ==
- B.B.A., University of Wisconsin, 1969
- M.S., Industrial Relations, University of Wisconsin, 1971
- Ph.D., Industrial Relations, University of Wisconsin, 1973

== Notable awards ==
- 1988 Recipient of the George Terry Scholarly Book Award from the Academy of Management for The Transformation of American Industrial Relations.
- 1992–1995 President, International Industrial Relations Research Association. (US Department of Labor)
- 1993 Appointed to Commission for the Future of Worker-Management Relations.
- 1996 Heneman Career Achievement Award, Academy of Management
- 1997 Elected Fellow of the National Academy of Human Resources.
- 1999 President of the Industrial Relations Research Association
- 2009 Elected to National Academy of Arbitrators
- 2009 Guest Editor in Chief, Special Research Forum of the Academy of Management Journal on Management Research and Public Policy
- 2010 Inaugural Fellow of the Labor and Employment Relations Association
- 2010 Academy of Management's Scholar-Practitioner Award
- 2012 PhD Dissertation Award of the Labor & Employment Relations Assn. “named” in Kochan's honor
- 2014 Honorary Doctor's Degree from Sydney University
- 2015 Aspen Institute Pioneer Lifetime Achievement Award

== Notable publications ==
- Working in America: Labor Market Institutions for the New Century. Cambridge, MA: MIT Press, 2001. (With Paul Osterman, Richard Locke and Michael Piore).
- Restoring the American Dream: A Working Families’ Agenda for America, Cambridge, MA: MIT Press, September 2005.
- “Who Should Close the Middle Skills Gap?” Harvard Business Review, December, 2012 (with David Finegold and Paul Osterman)
- “The American Jobs Crisis and its Implication for the Future of Employment Policy: A Call for a New Jobs Compact,” ILR Review, 66 (2) April, 2013. (Lead article).
- Shaping the Future of Work. Business Experts Press. Publication date, December, 2015.
