= Lisa M. Lynch =

American economist

Chief Economist of the United States Department of Labor
- In office October 1995 – January 1997
- President: Bill Clinton
- Preceded by: Alan Krueger

Personal details
- Party
- Scientific career
- Education: Wellesley College (BA); London School of Economics (MSc, PhD)
- Awards: Susan B. Eaton Outstanding Scholar-Practitioner Award from the Labor and Employment Relations Association, 2007
- Fields: labor economics, personnel economics
- Workplaces: Brandeis University, Tufts University, Massachusetts Institute of Technology, Ohio State University, and University of Bristol
- Website: Faculty page

Lisa M. Lynch is an American economist working as Maurice B. Hexter Professor of Social and Economic Policy at Brandeis University’s Heller School for Social Policy and Management and Director of the Institute for Economic and Racial Equity. She was previously Provost and Interim President of Brandeis University and Dean of the Heller School, a faculty member at Massachusetts Institute of Technology, Ohio State University, and University of Bristol, and a co-editor of the Journal of Labor Economics. She is a past chief economist of the United States Department of Labor, chair of the board of directors of the Federal Reserve Bank of Boston, and president of the Labor and Employment Relations Association.

== Selected works ==
- Black, Sandra E., and Lisa M. Lynch. "How to compete: the impact of workplace practices and information technology on productivity." Review of Economics and Statistics 83, no. 3 (2001): 434–445.
- Black, Sandra E., and Lisa M. Lynch. "Human-capital investments and productivity." The American economic review 86, no. 2 (1996): 263–267.
- Black, Sandra E., and Lisa M. Lynch. "What’s driving the new economy?: The benefits of workplace innovation." The Economic Journal 114, no. 493 (2004): F97-F116.
- Lynch, Lisa M. "Private-sector training and the earnings of young workers." The American Economic Review 82, no. 1 (1992): 299–312.
- Lynch, Lisa M., and Sandra E. Black. "Beyond the incidence of employer-provided training." ILR Review 52, no. 1 (1998): 64–81.
