= George H. Hildebrand =

American industrial relations scholar (1913–2007)

George Herbert Hildebrand Jr. (July 7, 1913 – May 18, 2007) was an American academic, mediator, and government official who was the Maxwell M. Upson Professor of Economics and Industrial and Labor Relations at Cornell University and served as a Deputy Undersecretary of Labor in the United States Department of Labor in the Nixon administration. Earlier he had been a professor of economics at the University of California, Los Angeles and before that a staff director with the National War Labor Board.

== Early life and education ==
Hildebrand was born on July 7, 1913, in Oakland, California, and grew up there. He attended Roosevelt High School in Oakland.

He then went to the University of California, Berkeley, where he graduated with what has been reported as either an A.B. degree in economics in 1934 or B.A. in 1935. Subsequent to that, he was affiliated with the economics department at Cornell University, then in 1937, began studying in the Ph.D. program at Harvard University. By 1939, he was at Cornell University again, working on a doctoral dissertation entitled "Development and present status of wage theory, with application to public policy". He may have gone between the two schools again. Subsequently, the subject of the dissertation was changed to "The theory of markets and the problem of economic crises from Quesnay to Marx: A study in the history of economic thought". In any case, he ended up receiving an M.A. degree in economics from Harvard in 1941 and a Ph.D. in Economics from Cornell in 1942.

== Initial academic posts and work for National War Labor Board ==
While waiting for his doctorate to be granted, Hildebrand worked as an instructor of economics, first at Cornell by 1938, then at Princeton University in 1939, then at Wellesley College, and then in 1941 at the University of Texas. With his PhD granted, by 1943 Hildebrand had become an assistant professor of economics at Texas.

At that point, Hildebrand went on leave from the University of Texas in order to serve on the National War Labor Board. At first he was in Washington, D.C. From March to June 1944, he was on a special technical committee to investigate and sometimes bitter public disputes surrounding the computation of the Bureau of Labor Statistics's cost-of-living index. Then by 1945, he was a director at the Region IX board in Denver, In particular, he was a director of the staff that concerned itself with wage stabilization. Hildebrand may also have been cross-assigned to the wage stabilization division at the Region X board in San Francisco. Around the same time, he was promoted to associate professor at the University of Texas.

== Professor at UCLA and Cornell ==
By 1947, Hildebrand was an assistant professor of economics at the University of California, Los Angeles. By 1954 he had risen to become a full professor there. In 1957 he was appointed the director of the UCLA Institute of Industrial Relations.

Hildebrand came to Cornell University in 1960. He held a joint appointment as both a professor of labor economics in the School of Industrial and Labor Relations and a professor of economics in the College of Arts and Sciences.

Hildebrand was vociferously opposed to the actions of the university administration during the Willard Straight Hall takeover of April 1969, saying that "the administration has allowed effective discipline to collapse completely, and has yielded to violence and threats of violence, and has rewarded illegal acts." Hildebrand believed that the purpose of the university was related to education and not to getting itself involved in controversial domestic or international issues. He was accordingly upset that, as he saw it, the administration had abetted in the "politicization of the campus" and had "refused to protect academic freedom". The situation badly divided the faculty; Hildebrand was one of ten senior faculty that publicly urged the removal of the university's president, James A. Perkins.

== Department of Labor official ==
Hildebrand resigned from the Cornell faculty. He took the position of Deputy Under Secretary of Labor for International Affairs, during the Nixon administration and under Secretary of Labor George P. Shultz. He was appointed to that position on May 19, 1969.

In addition, on November 12, 1969, Hildebrand was named as the U.S. government representative to the governing body of the International Labour Organization (ILO), succeeding the labor leader George L. P. Weaver. The appointment was made by President Nixon.

During 1970, the United States withdrew half of its financial support to the ILO following the appointment of an assistant director-general from the Soviet Union, an appointment that drew particular criticism from AFL–CIO president George Meany, who said that the ILO had become a vehicle for Soviet propaganda and that it employed a two-tiered standard for criticisms of Soviet and American labor issues. Hildebrand agreed with many of these criticisms. However, he thought that the United States should remain a fully-funding member of the ILO and seek to improve it from within, a position that an editorial in the New York Times noted him taking and found agreement with. Hildebrand testified before the U.S. Congress in March 1971 that his delegation had improved the situation measurably, including in "persuading the officials of ILO and the presiding officers at its meeting to rule out of order polemics and political attacks on the United States." In any case, the funds were eventually paid and the United States persisted in the ILO, for a while at least.

Hildebrand was also named as the labor department's representative on the Board of the Foreign Service, a ten-member body whose purpose was to advise the secretary of state on managing the United States Foreign Service and which was headed by Under Secretary of State Elliot L. Richardson.

He was still with the department as of June 1971.

== Return to Cornell ==
Hildebrand left government and returned to Cornell later in 1971. He was appointed the Maxwell M. Upson Professor of Economics and Industrial and Labor Relations.

Also in 1971, he was elected president of the Industrial Relations Research Association. In doing so, he followed in the path of noted industrial relations scholars such as E. Wight Bakke, Neil W. Chamberlain, and George P. Shultz.

At Cornell, Hildebrand taught courses that were co-listed between the School of Industrial and Labor Relations and the College of Arts and Sciences and that included "Problems in Labor Economics" and "Capitalism and Socialism". The latter of these included discussion of contemporary assessments from the likes of Milton Friedman, Joseph Schumpeter, Ludwig von Mises, and John Kenneth Galbraith.

In 1977, he became the initial director of the university's Center for the Study of the American Political Economy. This was an entity funded by the John M. Olin Foundation and whose activities included having free market economics thinkers such as Milton Friedman visit the campus for seminars and conferences.

Hildebrand retired from Cornell University in 1980.

== Mediator ==
Hildebrand was a noted mediator and arbitrator, especially in the copper industry.

== Scholarship ==
Hildebrand was the author of a number of books and journal articles.

After he retired, he co-authored what one scholar has termed "a landmark study of the copper industry", one that including analyzing aspects of the 1983 Arizona copper mine strike.

== Selected publications ==
- The Pacific Coast Maritime Shipping Industry, 1930–1948: An Economic Profile (University of California Press, 1952) [co-author with Wytze Gorter]
- Growth and Structure in the Economy of Modern Italy (Harvard University Press, 1965)
- Manufacturing Production Functions in the United States, 1957: An Interindustry and Interstate Comparison of Productivity (New York State School of Industrial and Labor Relations, Cornell University, 1965) [co-author with Ta-Chung Liu]
- Poverty, Income Maintenance and the Negative Income Tax (New York State School of Industrial and Labor Relations, Cornell University, 1967)
- American Unionism: An Historical and Analytical Survey (Addison Wesley, 1979)
- Borax Pioneer: Francis Marion Smith (Howell-North Books, 1982)
- Capital and Labor in American Copper, 1845–1990: A Study of the Linkages between Product and Labor Markets (Wertheim Publications in Industrial Relations, 1991) [co-author with Garth L. Mangum]
