= Charles Sabel =

American Professor of Law

Charles Fredrick Sabel (born December 1, 1947) is an American academic and professor of Law and Social Science at the Columbia Law School. His research centers on public innovations, European Union governance, labor standards, economic development, and ultra-robust networks.

== Biography ==
Sabel attended Harvard University and earned a B.A. in Social Studies in 1969 and a Ph.D. in Government in 1978. He was a faculty member in the departments of Political Science and Science, Technology, and Society at the Massachusetts Institute of Technology between 1977 and 1995. He joined the faculty at Columbia University in 1995. He is the recipient of a 1982 MacArthur Fellowship.

Together with philosophy professor Joshua Cohen and others he developed the theory of directly deliberative polyarchy or democratic experimentalism, which is related to the concept of deliberative democracy. This concept mainly builds upon Japanese production methods interpreted as the institutionalization of decentralized learning. This envisions democracy as a form of "directly-deliberative polyarchy" that promotes collective decision making in public arenas for citizens. According to Sabel and Cohen, this decentralizes power allows problems to be solved locally. Sabel together with Michael Dorf explained this notion further, citing that through rigorous citizen participation, local government units can provide solutions to given regulatory problem. In addition, national governing bodies can also pool information and determine syntheses as to which regulatory approaches are working.

His 1984 book, The Second Industrial Divide: Possibilities for Prosperity, co-written with Michael J. Piore, has been widely influential among labor scholars.

Sabel and others designed his mountain house via “a continuous mutual disruption,” which is a recurring theme in his scholarly work. He describes such disruptions saying, “What you do determines what I do, and vice versa. By the end of our collaboration, neither of us could have anticipated the result.”

Sabel received the honor of a Professorship through The Radboud Excellence Initiative at Radboud University Nijmegen in the Netherlands. Sabel was to begin his time in the Radboud Excellence Initiative in June 2015.

== Publications ==
- Fixing the Climate: Strategies for an Uncertain World, Princeton University Press, 2022. Coauthored with David G. Victor.
- Gilson, Ronald; Sabel, Charles; Scott, Robert (2009), Contracting for Innovation: Vertical Disintegration and Interfirm Collaboration, New York, NY: Columbia Law Review
- Sabel, Charles (2006), Learning by Monitoring, Cambridge, MA: Harvard University Press
- Sabel, Charles; Fung, Archon; O'Rourke, Dara (2001), Can We Put an End to Sweatshops?, Boston, MA: Beacon Press
- Sabel, Charles; Dorf, Michael C. (1998), A Constitution of Democratic Experimentalism, Cambridge, MA: Harvard University Press
- Sabel, Charles (1996), Local Partnerships and Social Innovation: Ireland, Dublin: OECD
- Sabel, Charles; Piore, Michael (1984), The Second Industrial Divide: Possibilities for Prosperity, New York: Basic Books
- Sabel, Charles (1982), Work and Politics: The Division of Labor in Industry, Cambridge, England: Cambridge University Press
- Sabel, Charles (1978), Ökonomische Krisentendenzen im gegenwärtigen Kapitalismus, Frankfurt: Campus Verlag
