= Streets International =

U.S.-based nonprofit organization

- Formation: 2007
- Type: U.S. 501(c)(3), non-profit corporation
- Purpose: Provides culinary and hospitality training to disadvantaged youths in Southeast Asia
- Key people: Neal Bermas, founder
- Website: www.streetsinternational.org
- Remarks: Operates the Streets Restaurant Café

Streets International, is a New York-based U.S. 501(c)(3), non-profit corporation, founded to provide culinary and hospitality training for street kids, orphans and other disadvantaged youth across Southeast Asia. Streets International is a self-sustaining initiative with all the revenues from the Streets Restaurant Café going to support the program.

== Program ==
Streets was established in 2007 and opened its Hoi An Restaurant Café in 2009. It provides a comprehensive an 18-month training program that follows a curriculum developed in conjunction with the Institute of Culinary Education in New York. Graduates finish the program with an international certificate in the hospitality and culinary fields. The program provides the necessary daily living support for participants—called 'Trainees'. This includes supervised housing, food, financial support and basic medical care. Trainees are selected from throughout Vietnam; program participants typically are orphaned or come from extreme poverty, including those that have been trafficked or are part of the often overlooked ethnic minority groups.

Streets' goal is to match the needs of disadvantaged youth with the opportunities in growing tourism economies, by providing job training, English language instruction and life skills education.

== Streets Restaurant Café ==
Program participants apprentice at the Streets Restaurant Café located at 17 Le Loi Street in the central historic district of Hội An, Quảng Nam Province, Vietnam. All proceeds from the Streets Restaurant Café help support the Training Program and other costs. The Streets Restaurant Café is listed in The Lonely Planet's Dining for a Cause, Vietnam section. Many articles have been published about the Restaurant and the project including features in The Wall Street Journal, Gourmet Live, Brandeis Magazine and Aviation.

== Trainee selection ==
Trainees for the Streets program are selected for each new class every nine months. Applicants come from all across Vietnam to be accepted into the program that supports between 15 and 20 Trainees per class. All applicants have disadvantaged backgrounds and are between 16 and 22 years old.

== Self-sustaining program ==
The organization goal is to be fully self-supporting, although there is an initial capital for each program site. Funding is also made possible by individual, corporate and foundation support. A Trainee Sponsorship program and fundraising events in the United States provide additional support.
