= Heller School for Social Policy and Management =

Public policy school of Brandeis University

Coordinates: 42°22′9.5″N 71°15′32.9″W

The Heller School for Social Policy and Management
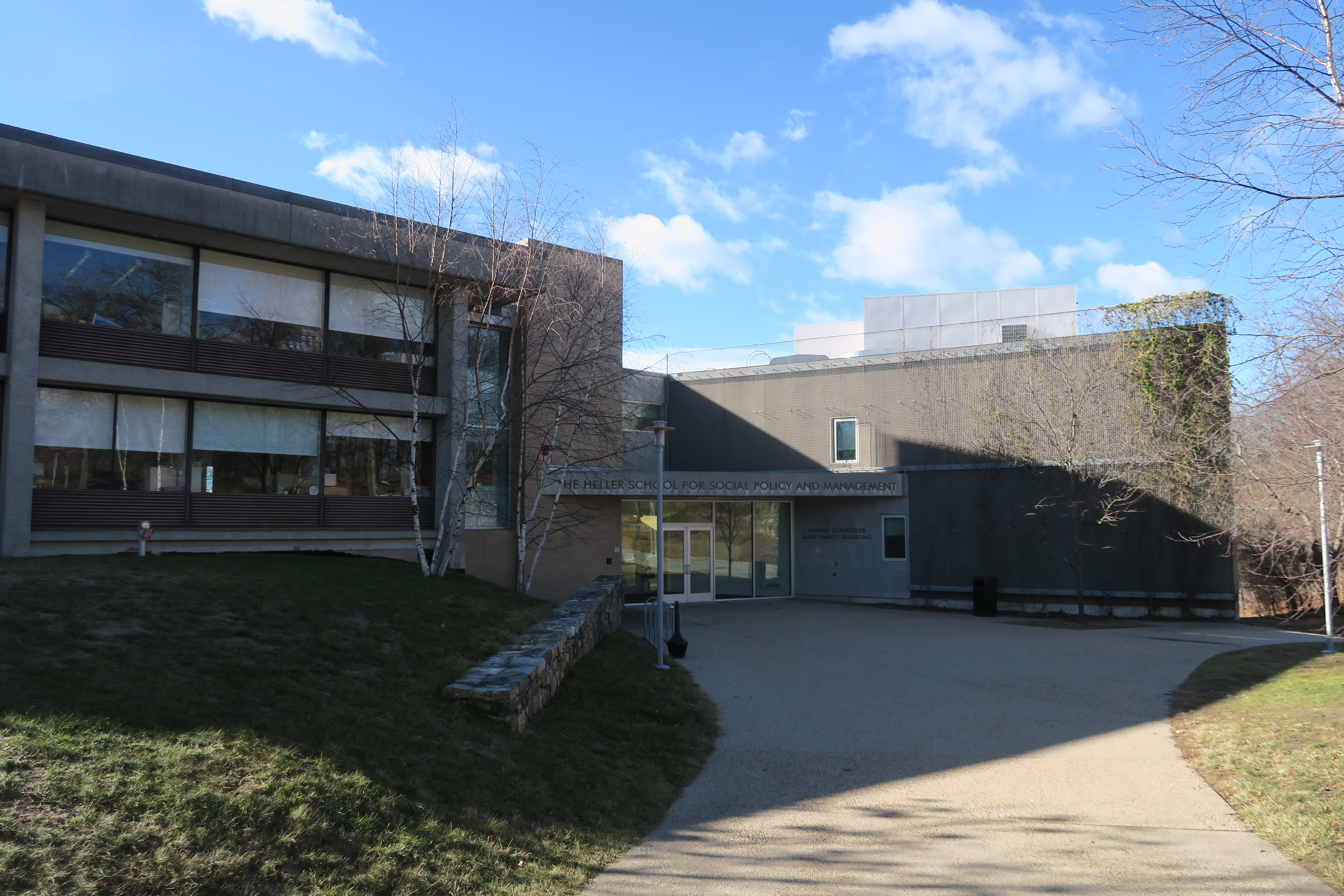
- Motto: "Knowledge Advancing Social Justice"
- Type: Private – Research
- Established: 1959
- Parent institution: Brandeis University
- Affiliations: APSIA - AACSB
- Endowment: Total revenues: $31.7 million Total expenses: $30 million
- Dean: vacant
- Academic staff: 68
- Students: 533
- Location: Waltham, MA, USA
- Campus: Semi-Urban
- Website: www.heller.brandeis.edu

The Heller School for Social Policy and Management is one of the four graduate schools of Brandeis University in Waltham, Massachusetts.

It is an AACSB and APSIA certified school. The school provides five academic programs conferring both masters and doctoral degrees. It is also a leading research institution and is the home to 10 institutes and centers focused on both global and domestic social policy issues. Founded in 1959 as the university's first professional school, Heller is located on the Brandeis University main campus along with the Brandeis University Graduate School of Arts and Sciences, Brandeis International Business School, and the Rabb School of Continuing Studies.

== History ==
Founded in 1959 as Florence G. Heller Graduate School for Advanced Studies in Social Welfare, it became Brandeis first professional graduate school.

The building was designed in 1966 by Benjamin Thompson, built into a hillside on a fieldstone base.

The school is named after Florence G. Heller the first female president of the National Jewish Welfare Board. Charles I. Schottland, a former Federal Commissioner on Social Security, was appointed as the first dean of the school. In 1988, Heller faculty members conducted a research study titled, "Support Services in Senior Housing," that led federal policy makers to enact the National Affordable Housing Act of 1990. In 1998, the 14th Dalai Lama visited Heller and accepted an honorary degree from Brandeis. In 2007, Bill Clinton gave an inaugural lecture at Heller's new building.

== Academics ==
Heller has 4,800 alumni, with 80% living in the United States and 20% living abroad. As of Fall 2020, it has 471 students, with a fifth of them coming from 53 countries. Of the domestic students, 41% are students of color. It has 145 faculty and research staff, including 39 scientists and fellows. In 2019, it had $19 million of sponsored research from corporations, foundations, and agencies including from United States Department of Justice, the National Institutes of Health and the World Bank. Heller School is one of three New England schools, along with Harvard Kennedy School and University of Connecticut, to be listed on U.S. News & World Report's top 50 graduate schools for public affairs, according to the magazine's 2016 rankings. The Heller School ranks in the top 10 schools for social policy in the United States and in the top 20 in health policy and management. Heller is one of only two New England graduate schools of public affairs to be ranked in either specialty area.

- PhD in Social Policy
- Executive MBA for Physicians
- MA in Sustainable International development (MA-SID)
- MS in Global Sustainability Policy and Management
- MPP in Public Policy

Joint degree programs:

- Heller MBA with Tufts Doctor of Medicine
- Heller MBA with Tufts Master of Biomedical Sciences

=== Faculty ===
Most longtime faculty and staff departed in 2024 and 2025. Dr. Jon Chilingerian, who established many programs at Heller such as the Executive MBA (EMBA) for physicians, died in 2023.

Heller has 68 faculty members. The key members include, PhD program director Dr. Diana Bowser (PhD, Harvard), M.A SID director Dr. Joan Dassin (PhD, Stanford), MBA program director Carole Carlson (MBA, Harvard University, Business School), MPP program director Michael Doonan (PhD, Brandeis), Conflict Resolution Director Alain Lempereur (PhD, Harvard), Director Executive Education Dr. Jon A. Chilingerian (PhD, MIT) and undergraduate program director Darren Zinner (PhD, Harvard). Its dean from 2017 to 2022 was Dr. David Weil (PhD, Harvard) Previous dean Dr. Lisa M. Lynch (PhD, LSE), now serves as provost and executive vice president of academic affairs of Brandeis University.

Prominent current faculty members at the Heller School include Stuart Altman, Peter Conrad, Anita Hill, Robert Kuttner, and Thomas Shapiro. Former U.S. Secretary of Labor Robert Reich previously taught at the Heller School. World Bank lists the Heller School as one of eight training institutions in the United States approved to host World Bank scholars pursuing graduate degrees. Heller School has strong links with AmeriCorps, Peace Corps, Tufts University and Northeastern University. The school has a cross-registration consortium with Boston College, Boston University, Massachusetts Institute of Technology and Tufts University. The school currently houses Our Generation Speaks, a fellowship program and startup incubator whose mission is to bring together young Israeli and Palestinian leaders through entrepreneurship.

== Campus ==
The Heller School is located on the campus of Brandeis University in Waltham, Massachusetts. The building occupied by the school is the Schneider building which was designed by Lewis.Tsurumaki.Lewis (LTL Architects) in 2007. It spread at 30,000 Sf, the building includes a library, media center lecture, and breakout spaces, lounges and study areas, faculty and administrative offices, and an open multi-story public "forum" space.

== Research Centers ==
Heller School is home to 11 research institutes.

- Schneider Institutes for Health Policy
- Institute on Healthcare Systems
- Institute for Behavioral Health
- Institute for Global Health and Development
- Institute on Assets and Social Policy
- Institute for Child, Youth and Family Policy
- Center for Youth and Communities
- Lurie Institute for Disability Policy
- Sillerman Center for the Advancement of Philanthropy
- Center for Global Development and Sustainability
- Relational Coordination Research Collaborative
