= George L. P. Weaver =

American labor leader (1912–1995)

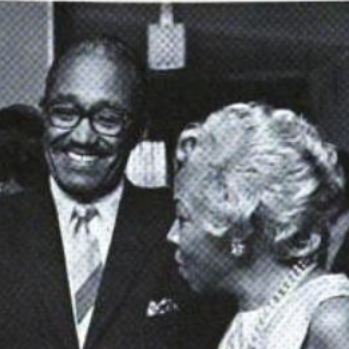
- George L. P. Weaver and his wife, Mary (1969)
- Born: George Leon-Paul Weaver; May 18, 1912; Pittsburgh, Pennsylvania, U.S.
- Died: July 14, 1995 (aged 83); Washington, D.C., U.S.
- Occupations: Assistant Secretary of Labor for International Affairs for Presidents John F. Kennedy and Lyndon B. Johnson
- Years active: 1941–1995
- Known for: Labor leader and civil rights activist

George Leon-Paul Weaver (May 18, 1912 – July 14, 1995) was an American labor leader, active in promoting civil rights both in the United States and internationally. After serving as Assistant Secretary of Labor for International Affairs in both the Kennedy and Johnson administrations, he was elected chair of the governing body of the International Labour Organization, a United Nations body, in 1968. He was the first American to be named "Honorary Commander" in the Order of the Defender of the Realm, a Malaysian federal award for meritorious service to the country.

== Early life and education ==
Weaver was born in Pittsburgh, Pennsylvania, and grew up in Dayton, Ohio. He attended what now is Roosevelt University in Chicago and Howard University law school in Washington, D.C. In 1962, Howard University awarded him an honorary law degree.

== Career ==
=== Labor unions ===
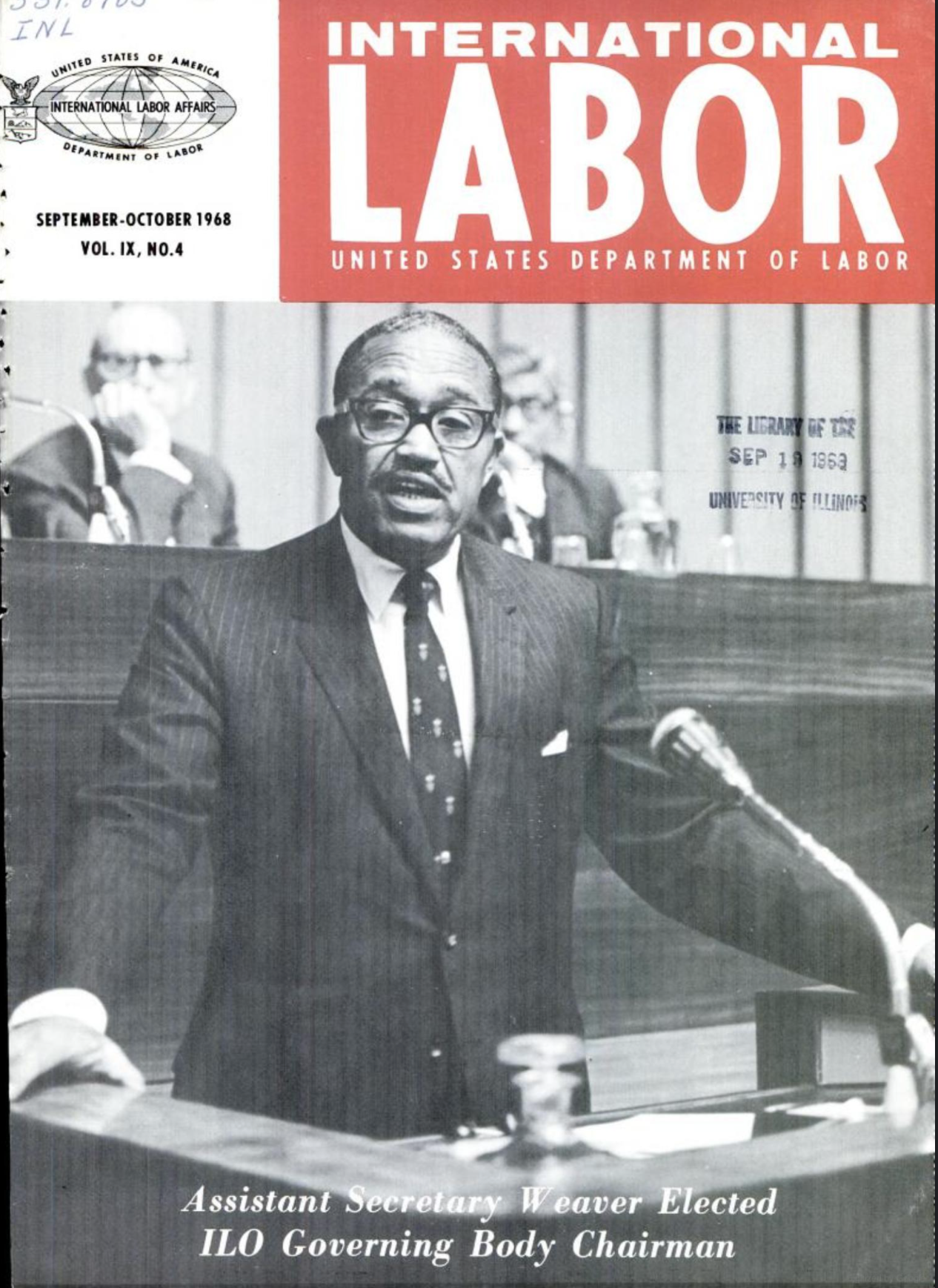
In 1968, Weaver was unanimously elected chair of the International Labour Organization's governing board.

In the 1930s, while working as a railway porter, he joined the United Transport Services Employees (UTSE). After his union joined the CIO in 1942, he became assistant to CIO's Secretary-Treasurer James B. Carey. In January 1943, Weaver was named to lead the CIO's new Committee to Abolish Racial Discrimination (CARD), marking the first time the CIO put any Black person into a leadership staff role.

After the CIO merged with the AFL to form the AFL–CIO in 1955, Weaver became executive secretary of the Civil Rights Committee.

In 1948, Weaver was sent as a union representative to the National Defense Conference on Negro Affairs, a meeting at The Pentagon organized by U.S. Secretary of Defense James Forrestal, whose goal was "introducing to the services in a systematic and documented way the complaints of responsible black leaders while instructing those leaders in the manpower problems confronting the postwar armed forces." Meeting attendees were unanimous that US military services needed to end segregation. Soon thereafter, President Truman's Executive Order 9981 (July 26, 1948) abolished discrimination "on the basis of race, color, religion or national origin" in the United States Armed Forces, and led to the re-integration of the services during the Korean War (1950–1953).

Beginning in 1950, Weaver worked on international labor issues as a special assistant to W. Stuart Symington, who chaired the National Security Resources Board and later the Reconstruction Finance Corporation. Symington credited Weaver with substantial help in stopping speculation that drove up tin prices, calling him in 1969 "one of the ablest public servants we have today."

During the 1950s, Weaver spent time abroad as a representative of the International Confederation of Free Trade Unions (ICFTU), with the goal of assisting foreign labor leaders. In 1955, ICFTU official Jay Krane described Weaver as "one of the outstanding Negro trade unionists in the United States and ... a leading figure in the fight against discrimination and segregation." In Okinawa, Singapore, and Malaysia, Weaver built relationships with local labor leaders that both sides later maintained with correspondence. He was also the US "workers' delegate" to conferences of the UN's International Labour Organization (ILO) in 1957 and 1958.

Weaver was recruited by his former boss James Carey in 1958 to leave the AFL–CIO for Carey's rival international union International Union of Electrical, Radio and Machine Workers. Weaver became Carey's assistant for political education and international programs. Carey recruited Weaver together with many other staff members from other unions, and delegated much authority to them. Weaver's official title was "assistant to the president on Civil Rights and the Committee on Political Education or COPE."

Weaver and Carey worked to promote labor support for Democratic candidates. In early primaries during the 1960 United States presidential election, Weaver campaigned for his former boss Stuart Symington, but after Symington was eliminated he shifted to support Kennedy.

=== Kennedy and Johnson administrations ===
In January 1961, President Kennedy appointed Weaver Assistant Secretary of Labor for International Affairs. After Kennedy's death, President Johnson continued Weaver in this role throughout his own administration.

From 1961 through 1969 when Richard Nixon won the presidency in 1968, Weaver chaired the United States delegation to the annual conference of the United Nations' International Labour Organization. In 1968, Weaver was unanimously elected to head the ILO's governing board for the year 1968–1969. After the expiration of his term, he remained at the ILO as special assistant to the Director-General, continuing in that post for several years. As part of that role, he served as the ILO's representative stationed in Washington, DC.

During the 1960s, Weaver was honored for his work with labor leaders in Southeast Asia. In 1963, he was the first American to be named "honorary commander" in the Order of the Defender of the Realm, a Malaysian federal award for meritorious service to the country. In 1968, the government of South Vietnam awarded him two civilian honors, a Kim Khanh Medal (Second Class) and the Labor Medal (First Class).
