= David G. Victor =

American scholar

- Occupations: Professor and Director

Academic background
- Education: Harvard University (A.B.); Massachusetts Institute of Technology (Ph.D.)

David G. Victor is a professor of innovation and public policy at the School of Global Policy and Strategy at UC San Diego, where he holds the Center for Global Transformation Endowed Chair in Innovation and Public Policy.

Victor is co-director of the campus-wide Deep Decarbonization Initiative. D2I is a collaboration of faculty from across the UC San Diego campus who work at the intersection of science, technology, and policy. The initiative was founded as a joint partnership between UC San Diego’s Jacobs School of Engineering and School of Global Policy and Strategy. At UC San Diego, Victor was previously co-founder of the Laboratory on International Law and Regulation (ILAR)

Victor is also a professor (adjunct) in Climate, Atmospheric Science & Physical Oceanography at the Scripps Institution of Oceanography, as well as (affiliated) professor, Department of Mechanical & Aerospace Engineering at the Jacobs School of Engineering.

Victor holds a Ph.D. in Political Science from the Massachusetts Institute of Technology and an A.B. in History and Science from Harvard University.

== Career ==
Prior to joining UC San Diego, Victor served as director of the Program on Energy and Sustainable Development (PESD) at Stanford University, where he was a professor at Stanford Law School and taught energy and environmental law. PESD is an international, interdisciplinary program that draws on the fields of economics, political science, law, and management to investigate how the production and consumption of energy affect human welfare and environmental quality. The program was funded by a $7.5 million grant from the oil giant BP. Earlier in his career he also directed the science and technology program at the Council on Foreign Relations and led one of the first major assessments of the effectiveness of international environmental law at International Institute for Applied Systems Analysis.

He is a member of the World Economic Forum’s Global Future Council on Energy, where his research and work focuses on natural gas as a transition fuel to deep decarbonization. Victor is also a member of the Council on Foreign Relations.

Victor was a convening lead author for the Intergovernmental Panel on Climate Change (IPCC).

In 2014, Victor was chosen to act as Chairman of the Community Engagement Panel (CEP) for decommissioning of the San Onofre Nuclear Power Plant. The CEP is composed of diverse stakeholders from nearby cities and counties. Members include elected officials, representatives of the U.S. military, environmental organizations, business and labor groups and academic institutions.

In 2016, Victor was appointed to Co-Chair, The Brookings Institution Energy Security and Climate Initiative.

In 2018, Victor filed a report as an expert witness on behalf of the federal government in the Juliana v. United States climate case, arguing that in light of other political pressures, the executive branch of the United States government had no control over the timing and rise of emissions from the US production of fossil fuels and that, due to the global nature of the problem, the rise in historical emissions could not be attributed to U.S national action.

In 2020, Victor was officially elected to the American Academy of Arts and Sciences, one of the nation's most esteemed honorary societies.

== Books ==
- Fixing the Climate: Strategies for an Uncertain World, Princeton University Press, 2022. Coauthored with Charles Sabel.
- Making Climate Policy Work, Polity Press, 2020. Coauthored with Danny Cullenward.
- Global Warming Gridlock: Creating More Effective Strategies for Protecting the Planet, Cambridge University Press, 2011.
- Oil and Governance: State-Owned Enterprises and the World Energy Supply, Cambridge University Press, 2011.
- Natural Gas and Geopolitics: From 1970 to 2040, Cambridge University Press, 2006.
- The Collapse of the Kyoto Protocol and the Struggle to Slow Global Warming, Princeton University Press, 2004.
- Climate Change: Debating America's Policy Options, Council on Foreign Relations Press, 2004
