= Adam Cohen (journalist) =

American journalist

Adam S. Cohen
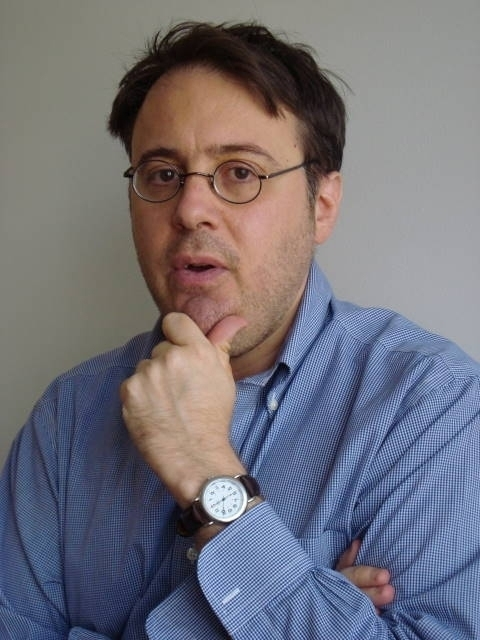
- Born: 1962 or 1963 (age 63–64)
- Education: Harvard University (BA, JD)
- Occupations: Journalist; author
- Notable credit: The New York Times

Adam Seth Cohen (born c. 1962) is an American journalist, author, lawyer, and former assistant editorial page editor of The New York Times. He also worked in the administration of New York City Mayor Bill de Blasio.

== Education ==
Cohen graduated from Bronx High School of Science. He obtained his bachelor's degree in the interdisciplinary honors Social Studies program from Harvard College in 1984 and received his J.D. degree in 1987 from Harvard Law School where he was the president of the Harvard Law Review.

== Career ==
After graduating from Harvard Law School, Cohen clerked for Judge Abner Mikva on the federal D.C. Circuit Court of Appeals and then served as a lawyer for the Southern Poverty Law Center in Montgomery, Alabama. Cohen subsequently worked as a staff attorney for the American Civil Liberties Union (ACLU) in New York City. While at the ACLU, he focused on school finance and educational equity issues and was part of the legal team that brought an Alabama state court class action in 1991, claiming that the public school system violated the state constitution by failing to provide an equitable, adequate or "liberal" education. In 1993 the state courts ruled in favor of the ACLU and the children plaintiffs in Harper v. Hunt, finding that poor schools were not equitably funded. The lower court decision was reviewed in the federal courts. During his tenure as Alabama attorney general, Jeff Sessions, later President Donald Trump's attorney general of the United States, fought against the findings of the Alabama courts. Sessions was ultimately successful in his campaign to prevent schools in poorer Alabama communities from being funded at the same level as schools in wealthier districts.

After leaving the ACLU, Cohen spent seven years as a senior writer for Time magazine, until he left to become a member of The New York Times editorial board. During his tenure at the Times, from 2002 until 2010, Cohen's editorials focused on tech and legal affairs. After leaving The New York Times, he became a lecturer in law at Yale Law School and a fellow at the Yale Information Society Project, teaching courses in media and internet law. He also wrote a legal column which appeared in Time.com every Monday.

Beginning in 2011, Cohen also served as special policy advisor to New York State Governor Andrew Cuomo. In 2014 Cohen joined New York City Mayor de Blasio's administration as chief speechwriter. In 2015 he moved to the mayor's Center for Economic Opportunity, as a special policy advisor. Along with Elizabeth Taylor, the literary editor of the Chicago Tribune and Cohen's co-author of American Pharaoh: Mayor Richard J. Daley, His Battle for Chicago and the Nation, Cohen is also co-editor of The National Book Review. In 2017, Cohen was a Pulitzer Prize juror in the category of criticism and in 2018 he was a juror in the category of Feature Writing.

Cohen is the author of five books. The most recent, Supreme Inequality: The Supreme Court's Fifty-Year Battle for a More Unjust America, argues that the United States Supreme Court turned away from protecting the poor and weak and from advancing a more just and equal society across broad and diverse areas of law (education, poverty, campaign finance, democracy, workers' rights, corporations, and criminal justice), reversing the course the law had been on under the jurisprudence of the Warren Court. This reversal occurred in the aftermath of Chief Justice Earl Warren's retirement and President Richard Nixon's successful bid—deemed a ruthless and baseless "squeeze play" by Cohen—to force liberal Justice Abe Fortas off the court by threatening federal investigations of Fortas and his wife. Nixon went on to appoint four conservative justices (new Chief Justice Warren Burger, future Chief Justice William Rehnquist, then-conservative Associate Justice Harry Blackmun, and Associate Justice Lewis Powell). Calling the book "impressive and necessary", The New York Times praises Cohen's "sweeping review" as showing that "the Court has repeatedly engaged in judicial activism against the poor", aggressively exacerbating income inequality in the United States. "Cohen sums up the result of fifty years of jurisprudence in the areas he explores, writing that 'the post-1969 Court has been working unrelentingly to protect the wealthy and powerful, and to make [the United States] more hierarchical and exclusionary - and it has been succeeding. When it comes to the law, and its many consequences for society, we are all living in Nixon's America now.'"

Asked to explain how he reconciles the post-Warren Court's progressive-leaning decisions on gay rights (marriage equality), curbing executive powers during wartime and (some) reproductive freedom decisions with his narrative of a reactionary court, Cohen responded, "Well, you might just say that in a capitalist system like ours, wealth and money and the current income and wealth distribution are really where the rubber hits the road. Look at how corporations actually have gotten a lot better on things like affirmative action, inclusion, gay rights, and things like that, but they haven't gotten good at distributing their money to the poor. That's really the thing that separates the corporate mentality from a more progressive outlook."

In April 2023, in response to reports of Supreme Court Justice Clarence Thomas's failure to disclose a series of luxurious presents and benefits he received from conservative activist billionaire Harlan Crow, Cohen penned an Op Ed in The New York Times, drawing an unfavorable comparison to the bipartisan agreement on ethics that had marked the resignation of Justice Abe Fortas from the Supreme Court in 1969.

Cohen's previous book, Imbeciles: The Supreme Court, American Eugenics, and the Sterilization of Carrie Buck, was named to the longlist for the 2016 National Book Award, and is slated to be made into an Amazon film, Unfit, starring Dakota Johnson.

== Books ==
- Co-author of American Pharaoh: Mayor Richard J. Daley, His Battle for Chicago and the Nation (2000)
- The Perfect Store: Inside E-Bay (2002)
- Nothing to Fear: FDR's Inner Circle and the Hundred Days That Created Modern America (2009)
- Imbeciles: The Supreme Court, American Eugenics, and the Sterilization of Carrie Buck, Penguin Press (Mar. 1, 2016)
- Supreme Inequality: The Supreme Court's Fifty-Year Battle for a More Unjust America, Penguin Press (publication date Feb. 25, 2020)
- Captain's Dinner, Simon & Schuster (publication date Nov. 18, 2025)
