= Democratic experimentalism =

Interpretation of democracy

Democratic experimentalism is an interpretation of democracy that seeks to combine certain democratic concepts with a practice of thought and action. It denotes varied pragmatic perspectives in legal theory, political science, political theory, and sociology. It is considered a new paradigm of institutional thinking about democracy and law that conceives different roles for legal actors.

== Origin ==
Some trace the origin of democratic experimentalism to John Dewey's pragmatism. It is said that his thoughts provided the philosophical backdrop to the concept's proposals. Dewey himself introduced the term “democratic experimentalism” around 1927. His conceptualization was based on the idea that knowledge is rooted in experiences that emerge from moments of crises. Later, the term cropped up in German politics and was often quoted by Chancellor Konrad Adenauer, who argued that the concept opposes the normative postulates promising certainty and stability. As the standard bearer of the Christian Democratic Party, he popularized the concept by consistently attacking it during the 1957 German election campaign. Through the slogan, Keine Experimente (No Experiments), he argued that the successes of postwar Germany should not be risked by the reform plans that other parties proposed.

Democratic experimentalism was later developed by scholars such as Charles Sabel, Michael Dorf, and Joshua Cohen. These scholars explained the flaws of the conception of democracy as command and control. They argued that democratic processes in this setting are part of the problem, calling for experimentation so that it becomes part of the solution.

== Concept ==
It is argued that democracy is linked to political autonomy, which entails "the freedom to conduct and participate in political experiments. Due to the structural complexity and the unpredictable dynamics of modern society, processes are understood as experiments in democratic experimentalism. For some thinkers, these experiments are variations of scientific experimentalism, although more pragmatic. In this case, John Weber maintained that although processes may be relaxed, trying things should still be based on ethics and public policy.

According to Roberto Frega, "democratic experimentalism provides not only a framework for rethinking democracy but also "a set of theoretical insights to explain why democracy correlates positively with social innovation." Frega maintained that its orientation toward methods of production control and the testing of new solutions to existing problems can lead to reforms. This can be demonstrated in the capability to observe how and in what conditions the various publics engage or disengage in processes that seek to address public problems. Frega subscribed to the pragmatist notion that policy interventions are types of field experiments. As experiments can generate learning, they contribute to the solution of complex technical problems and also empower citizens to challenge contested or dominant views in society.

== Applications ==
When applied to the courts, democratic experimentalism is demonstrated in the way judicial review becomes an evaluation of the admissibility of the reasons private and political actors give for their decisions, including the respect accorded to their decisions. The concept is said to help the courts avoid the dogmatic and authoritarian legalism. Decisions informed by democratic experimentalism is said to address the ambiguities and empirical difficulties of cases.

Institutional theorists cite the incidence of social cooperation in all kinds of economic transactions. In democratic experimentalism, institutions can function as creators of circumstances that promote cooperation. This intersection is said to demonstrate the extension of the normative core of democracy to the functioning of economic institutions. From Adenauer's critique more than half a century ago, recent observers underscore the importance of democratic experimentalism, citing that it has created a new mode of experimentalist governance. This is supported by a recognition that some type of experimentality is already part of modern society.

== Critique ==
Some theorists outline key challenges to democratic experimentalism. These include the difficulty in measuring success as well as the institutional will and the capabilities of public, private actors, and social movements to complete undergo benchmarking, and agree on the need for best practices, among others. A critique of the experimentalist judicial review cite several points and these are:

- experimentalism focuses on faith in procedural over substantive interpretations and undervalues confrontational politics;
- it fails to appreciate or address deliberative inequalities; and,
- it overestimates the power of local problem-solving.
