= Paul Osterman =

Paul Osterman is the Nanyang Technological University Professor Emeritus of Human Resources and Management at the MIT Sloan School of Management.

== Books ==
- Disposable Workers: The Transformation of Employment (Harvard University Press, 2026)
- Who Will Care For Us?: Long-Term Care and the Long-Term Workforce (Russell Sage Foundation, 2017)
- with Beth Shulman Good Jobs America: Making Work Better For Everyone (Russell Sage Foundation, 2011)
- The Truth about Middle Managers (Harvard Business Press, 2008)
- Gathering Power: The Future of Progressive Politics in America (Beacon Press, 2003)
- with T.A. Kochan, R.M. Locke, M.J. Piore Working in America: A Blueprint for the New Labor Market (MIT Press, 2001)
- Securing Prosperity: The American Labor Market (Princeton University Press, 1999)
- with T.A. Kochan The Mutual Gains Enterprise (Harvard Business School Press, 1994)
- Employment Futures: Reorganization, Dislocation and Public Policy (Oxford University Press, 1988)
- Getting Started: The Youth Labor Market (MIT Press, 1980)

=== Editor ===
- Creating Good Jobs: An Industry-Based Strategy (MIT Press, 2020)
- Economy In Society: Essays In Honor of Michael J. Piore (MIT Press, 2012)
- Broken Ladders: Managerial Careers in the New Economy (Oxford University Press, 1996)
- Internal Labor Markets (MIT Press, 1984)
