= Labor relations =

Study of work and workers

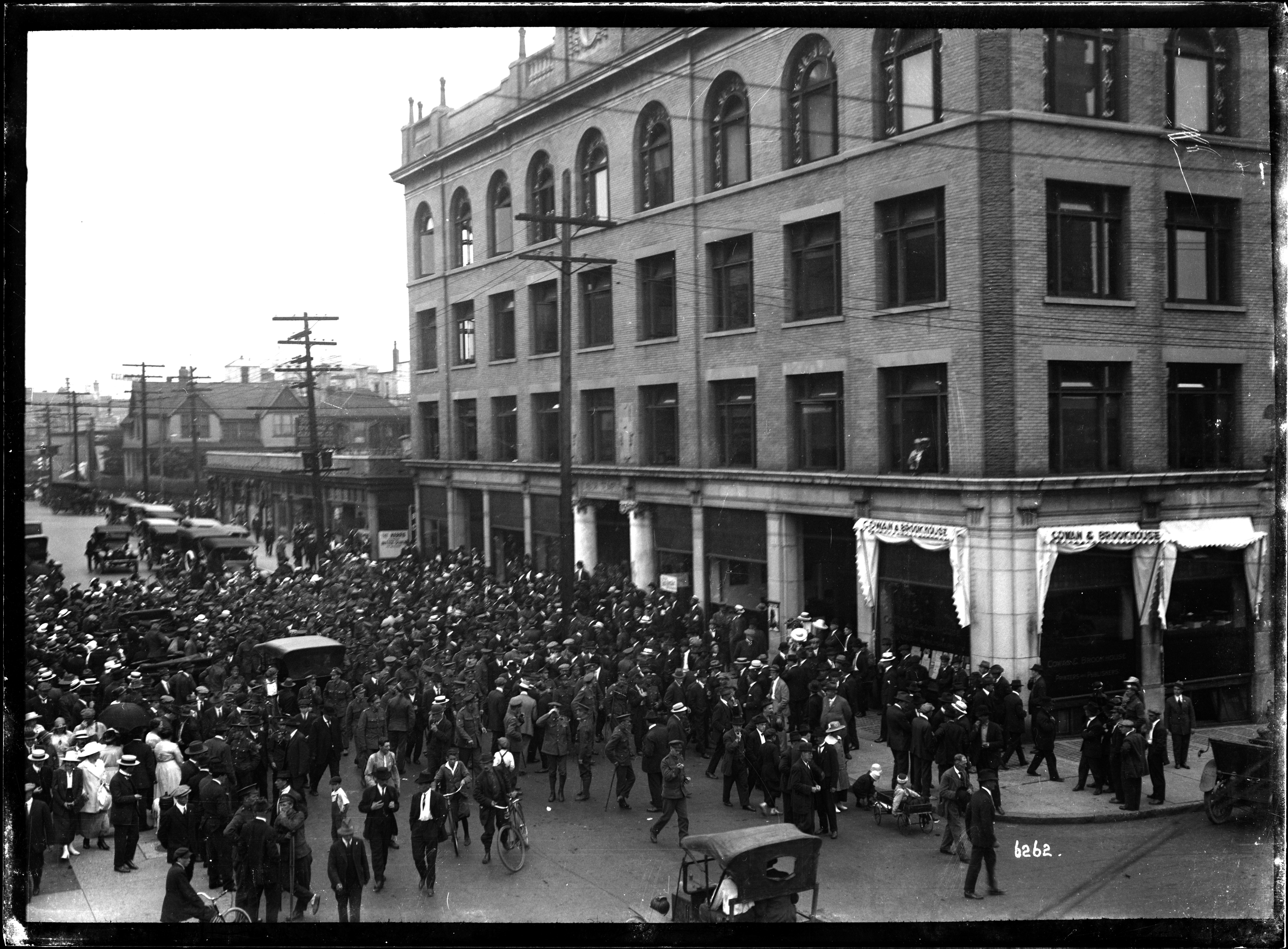
Vancouver Labour Temple during the general strike in 1918

Labor relations or labor studies is a field of study that can have different meanings depending on the context in which it is used. In an international context, it is a subfield of labor history that studies the human relations with regard to work in its broadest sense and how this connects to questions of social inequality. It explicitly encompasses unregulated, historical, and non-Western forms of labor. Here, labor relations define "for or with whom one works and under what rules. These rules (implicit or explicit, written or unwritten) determine the type of work, type and amount of remuneration, working hours, degrees of physical and psychological strain, as well as the degree of freedom and autonomy associated with the work." More specifically in a North American and strictly modern context, labor relations is the study and practice of managing unionized employment situations. In academia, labor relations is frequently a sub-area within industrial relations, though scholars from many disciplines including economics, sociology, history, law, and political science also study labor unions and labor movements. In practice, labor relations is frequently a subarea within human resource management. Courses in labor relations typically cover labor history, labor law, union organizing, bargaining, contract administration, and important contemporary topics.

In the United States, labor relations in most of the private sector is regulated by the National Labor Relations Act. Labor relations in the railroad and airline industries are regulated by the Railway Labor Act. Public sector labor relations is regulated by the Civil Service Reform Act of 1978 and various pieces of state legislation. In other countries, labor relations might be regulated by law or tradition. An important professional association for United States labor relations scholars and practitioners is the Labor and Employment Relations Association.

== Labour relations in Canada ==
=== Similarities with the United States ===
Labour relations in Canada and the United States are exceptionally similar, with a 1959 survey of 15 countries describing them as a single system. Until the 1970s, the majority of union members and union organizations had a place with United States–based specialty, modern and industrial associations. In Canada, more than 4000 subsidiaries and branch plants of American corporations exist. In the 1960s, due to institutional and political factors that were shared with the United States, there was an unusually high amount of strikes, as well, the incidence of violence and illegal activities that came out of work and labour disputes has been much higher in the Canada and the United States than in other industrialized countries. Characteristics that would lead to higher aggressive strikes would be the result of mass unionization and the hostility that arose from the widespread employer opposition to unions, organizational and institutional union rivalries, and the absence of a large labour party.

=== Differences with the United States ===
Although the United States and Canada share many similarities with modern labour relations, there are definitely a few defining differences between the two nations. In Canada, there is not a set of labour laws followed by all the provinces, instead all provinces have their own set of laws, and although they may be similar they are not federally run. Unlike Canada, the United States has a more centralized system where all states follow the same labour laws run by the National Labour Relations Board (NLRB). Another difference between the two countries is there are many more Canadian workers than there are American workers covered by labour relations laws. In 2008, it was reported that 31.2% of public and private employment in Canada were covered, and only 13.7% in the United States.

== Unions ==
Unions are a significant aspect of labor relations and provide job security to workers and ensure all employees are well compensated for labor. Union negotiators offer high-level pay in exchange for workers to tolerate repetitive job design or unsafe working conditions. Unions are critical in providing security and assurance to employees that their job position will remain unaffected and always compensated for their work. Some of the unions' main objectives are; job security, suitable compensation for labor, job design, retraining and reskilling, and health and safety. No matter how strong the union is, there is often a mismatch between critical company decision-making and the union representatives' demands. However, to provide proper job security and suitable compensation for employees, agreements must be made between union representatives and employers.

Unions have a positive impact on benefits and total compensation in Canada when compared with non-unionized work environments. Results from the Canadian general Social Survey (GSS) in 1998 demonstrate that union work environments increase total compensation by 12.4 percent, and 10.4 percent by wages. In terms of total compensation, the empirical data suggests that unions have achieved larger fringe benefits for their members in comparison to non-union. As for wages, Union-non-union differentials were found to vary across the Canadian labour market. Previous studies on unions' impact on Canadian wages through the use of the GSS indicated that the union-non-union differential was 18 percent. However, a more recent study indicates that the differential is 10.4%. This decline of differential indicates an increase of competitive pressure.

== Perspectives on labour relations ==
=== Unitary perspective ===
In a unitary perspective there is an emphasis on employees sharing common objectives and being harmonious with one another. This perspective views strikes as pathological. Labour relations in which trade unions are involved are viewed negatively and labelled unnecessary. Within this perspective there are alternative positions held upon matters such as trade unions. Some view labour relations with unions as an extension to the relationship that exists between managers and employees in regards to communications.

=== Pluralism perspective ===
In the pluralistic perspective it is accepted that conflict will arise between employees and organizations as there will be divergent opinions in some situations. In order to deal with the conflict that may arise between those in a labour relationship trade unions are used. Managers view trade unions as an inconvenience but respect the authority of them.

=== Marxist perspective ===
Also called radical perspective or conflict model. This perspective is to reveal the nature of the capitalist society. It recognizes inequalities in power in the employment relationship and in wider society as a whole. Consequently, conflict is perceived as a result.

== Collective bargaining ==
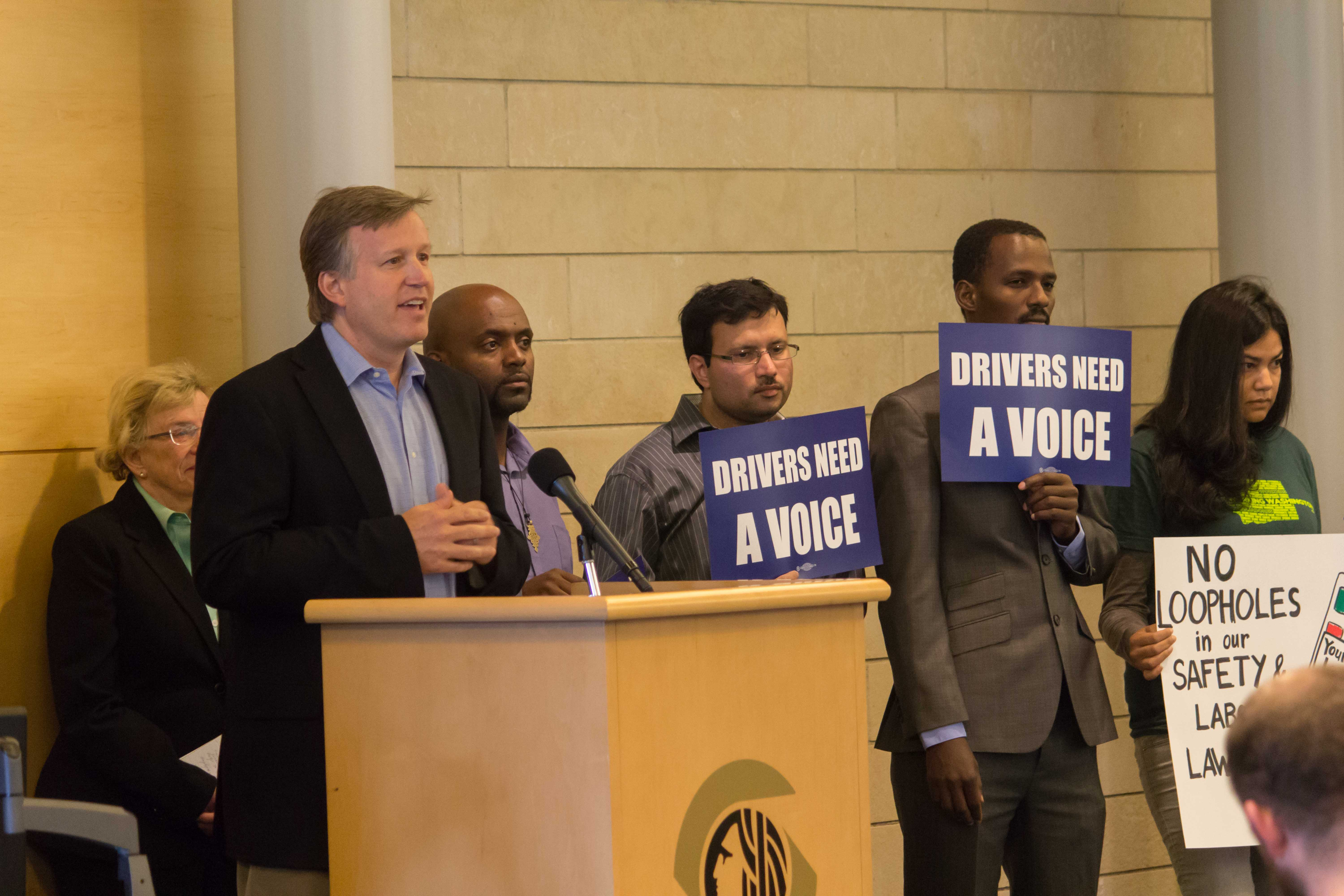
Collective Bargaining Press Conference

Collective bargaining is a vital part of labour relations. It is essential to labor relations because it sets the tone for a fair and equal workplace which forms the basis for cordial labor relations. Collective Bargaining is used to ensure all workers are represented equally and fairly. When collective bargaining is exercised within organizations, it is to address working conditions, terms of employment, and work relations. It can even include 'productivity bargaining' agreements between employers and workers in which changes to working practices are implemented in return for higher pay or job security. Such negotiations take place between the employer and the union with the intent of coming to a collective agreement. Negotiations can end in either a strike by workers, a lockout by employers, a boycott, or the primary goal, an agreement. Although collective bargaining can be seen as simple social discussion, it is more substantive than that. It is “a fundamental and principle right at work.” Collective bargaining also provides a sense of equality and equity, and it gives the worker the ability to partake in building a fair and legal work environment.

=== Equality in collective bargaining ===
Collective bargaining can be traced back to the industrial revolution in the 18th-19th century. During this time, many jobs were lost to the ability of machines taking over. Because of this, people started to form organizations to protect their jobs and income. Thus, bringing about unions and, in turn, collective bargaining. Collective bargaining is a right for workers and can bring about many benefits, including limiting biases and equity gaps. Thus, ensuring all workplaces are fair. Collective Bargaining has been proven to lower the wage gap and establish more equality in workers and wages. Internationally, countries that use collective bargaining have lower wage inequality such as Denmark, Finland, France, the Netherlands and Sweden, and countries who use collective bargaining less, have higher wage inequality, like Hungary and Poland. Collective bargaining has also played a role in shrinking the gender pay gap. Although collective bargaining has helped the gender pay gap, due to its role in directly affecting wages, there is still unfair equity in benefits and bonuses given out. Developed countries like the UK who practice collective bargaining still have a sizeable pay gap. Developing countries like specific places in Africa, where they do not rely on collective bargaining, have a gender pay gap as well. This shows that although collective bargaining may help, it is not the be-all end all to the problem.

=== International Labor Organization ===
An integral part of collective bargaining is the ILO (International Labour Organization). The ILO contains International Labour Standards that ensure equity. "The ILO supports governments to fulfil their international obligation to respect, to promote, and to realize the effective recognition of the right to collective bargaining, and to take measures to encourage the full development of machinery for voluntary negotiations." Technical Assistance (provided by the ILO) including, advisory services and technical cooperation’s, help employers and governments exercise their workers freedom and association and right to collective bargaining. The ILO states, “all member states accept an obligation to respect, promote and realize the effective recognition of the right to collective bargaining.” Therefore the ILO is international so that not only the westernized countries but developing countries as well can strive to get equal and fair treatments for their workers.

=== Collective bargaining in the United States ===
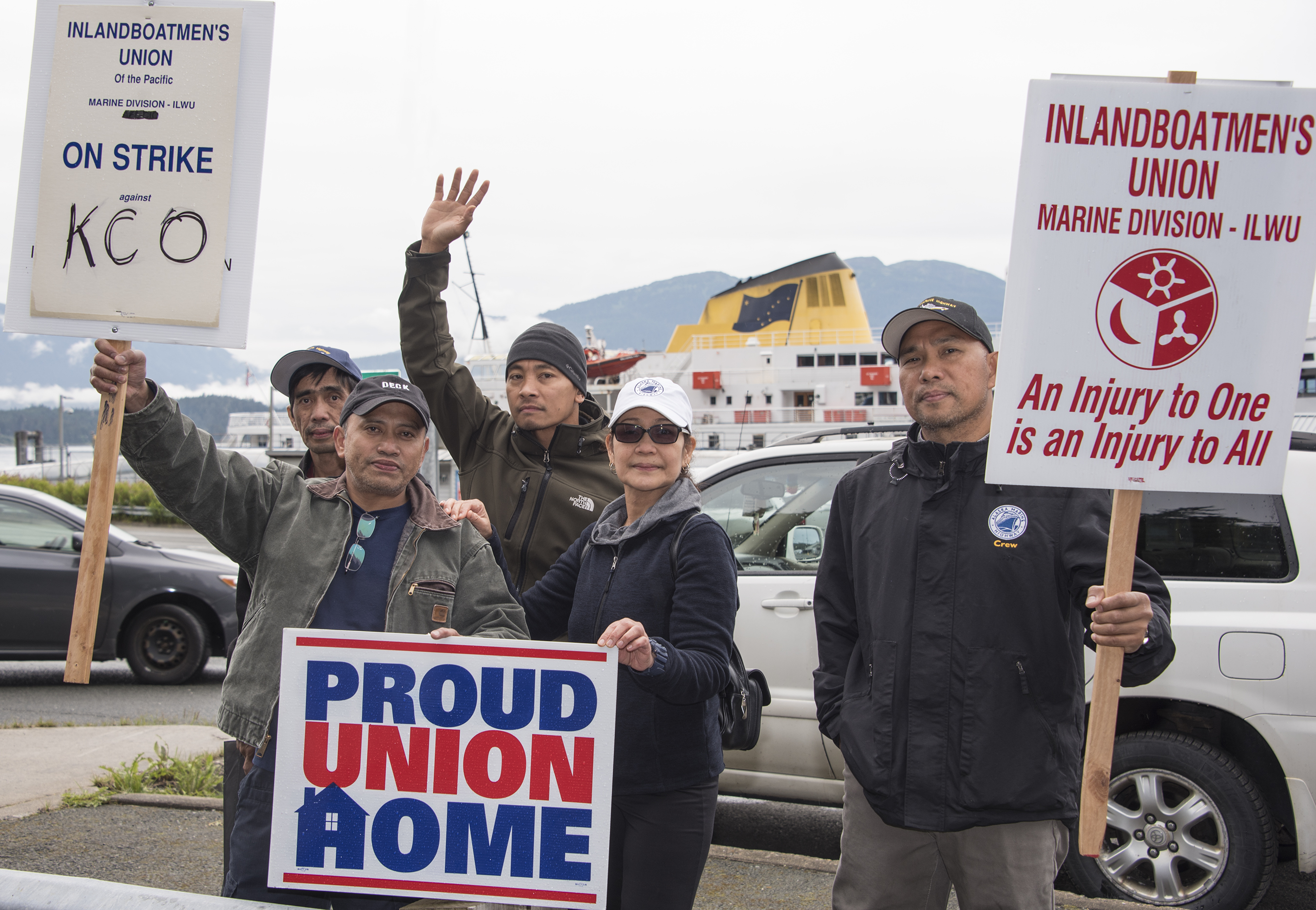
Inlandboatmen's Union Members Protesting While on Strike

To maintain equal and fair treatment for both employees and employers the 74th United States Congress created the National Labor Relation Act ("NLRA") in 1935. They use a federal or national act to create a basic standard for everyone across America. The lack of a state level law makes understanding collective bargaining laws easier. However, a downside is there is a lack of specification by centralizing labor relation laws means that a state is unable to amend the laws to better suit its people. In Canada, each province is given legal jurisdiction over their labor relation laws.

=== Challenges of collective bargaining ===
During collective bargaining, unions and employers both have ways to shut down the organization if the bargaining is not resulting in the demands each party wants. A union has the option to go on strike and the organization or employer can use a lockout. Strike authorizations votes are common to influence or threaten their employer in becoming more understanding. Whereas lockouts have the same effect on unions. Both parties have extreme ways to influence and can result in costly shutdowns for unions or employer. The Pullman Strike was a major strike in America that cost the Pullman Company millions lost revenue however, over a million dollars was also lost in wages for workers on strike.

== See also ==
- International Labour Organization
- Labour laws
