= Lawrence M. Kahn =

American economist

- Born: 1950 (age 75–76)
- Education: University of Michigan, Ann Arbor, University of California, Berkeley
- Spouse: Francine Blau
- Scientific career
- Fields: Labor economics
- Workplaces: Cornell University School of Industrial and Labor Relations
- Thesis: Unions and Labor Market Segmentation (1975)

Lawrence M. Kahn (born 1950) is the Braunstein Family Professor and professor of economics at the Cornell University School of Industrial and Labor Relations.

== Education ==
Kahn received his B.A. with High Honors and High Distinction in mathematics from the University of Michigan, Ann Arbor in 1971 and his Ph.D. in economics from the University of California, Berkeley in 1975 with a dissertation entitled "Unions and Labor Market Segmentation".

== Career ==
Kahn was a professor of economics and labor and industrial relations at the University of Illinois from 1975 until 1994, when he joined the Cornell faculty. At Cornell, he was chair of the labor economics department from 1998 to 1999 and 2000–2005.

== Honors and awards ==
Kahn is an elected Fellow of the Society of Labor Economists. He is a Research Fellow of the Center for Economic Studies/Ifo Institute for Economic Research in Munich, Germany, of the Institute for the Study of Labor in Bonn, Germany, and of the National Centre for Econometric Research in Australia. He has served as a member of the National Academy of Sciences Committee on Women's Employment and Related Social Issues.

== Editorial activities ==
Along with Rosemary Batt, Kahn is the co-editor-in-chief of ILR Review. He is also on the editorial board of the Journal of Sports Economics, served as associate editor of the Industrial & Labor Relations Review, and specialized co-editor (for sports economics) of Economic Inquiry and was on the board of editors of Industrial Relations.

== Personal life ==
Kahn is married to Francine Blau, who is also a professor of economics at Cornell.
