= Francine D. Blau =

American economist

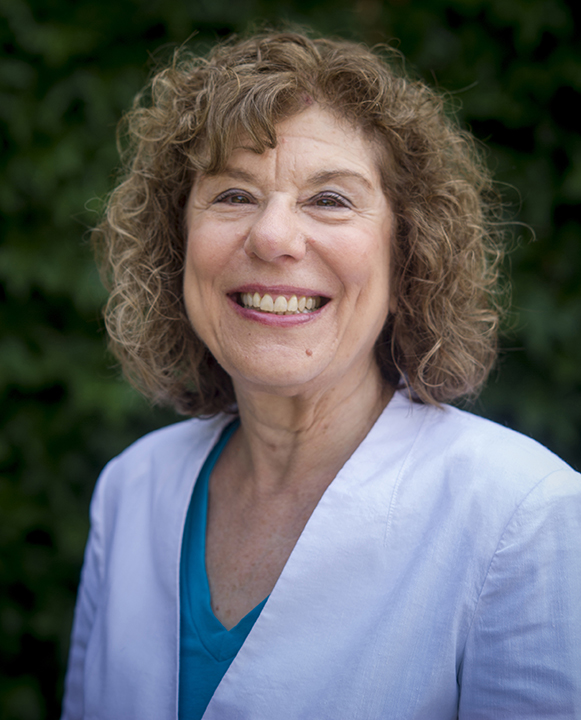
- Born: August 29, 1946 (age 80); New York City, New York, United States

Academic background
- Education: Cornell University (B.S.); Harvard University (M.A., Ph.D.)

Academic work
- Discipline: Institution and Labor Relations, Economics
- Institutions: NBER (1988–present); Cornell University (1994–present)
- Notable ideas: Research on gender and labor market inequality
- Awards: IZA Prize in Labor Economics (2010) Jacob Mincer Award (2017) AEA Distinguished Fellow (2018)
- Website: Information at IDEAS / RePEc

Francine Dee Blau (born August 29, 1946, in New York City) is an American economist and professor of economics as well as Industrial and Labor Relations at Cornell University. In 2010, Blau was the first woman to receive the IZA Prize in Labor Economics for her "seminal contributions to the economic analysis of labor market inequality." She was awarded the 2017 Jacob Mincer Award by the Society of Labor Economists in recognition of lifetime of contributions to the field of labor economics. In 2018, she became an American Economic Association (AEA) Distinguished Fellow for her pioneering scholarship on labor market inequality.

== Personal life and education ==
Blau was born to parents Harold Raymond Blau and Sylvia Blau, née Goldberg, in New York City. Her parents divorced when she was six years old. She and her brother lived with their mother until Sylvia Blau became ill. After that, the children went to live with their father. Harold Blau supported Francine's wish to become an economist.

Blau graduated from Forest Hills High School in Queens in 1963, after which she entered Cornell University and received her B.S. in industrial and labor relations in 1966. She received her M.A. in economics from Harvard University in 1969 and her Ph.D. in economics from the same university in 1975.

Blau is married to Lawrence M. Kahn, also an economics professor at Cornell University. Together they have two children.

== Career ==
Blau is currently the Frances Perkins Professor of Industrial and Labor Relations and Professor of Economics, Emeritus, at Cornell University. Before coming to Cornell in 1994, she was an assistant, associate, and professor of Economics and Labor and Industrial Relations at the University of Illinois at Urbana-Champaign where she joined the faculty in 1975. Prior to that, she was a research associate at Ohio State University and a visiting lecturer at Yale University.

Blau is a research associate at the National Bureau of Economic Research, a research fellow at the Institute for the Study of Labor (IZA@LISER, formerly IZA), the Center for Economic Studies, and the RFBerlin (ROCKWOOL Foundation). She is a fellow of the Society of Labor Economists, the American Academy of Political and Social Science, and the Labor and Employment Relations Association. She is also a fellow at the Center for the Study of Poverty and Inequality (Stanford University) and a research fellow at the Compensation Research Initiative (Cornell University).

She has served as vice president of the American Economic Association, president of the Society of Labor Economists, the Labor and Employment Relations Association, and the Midwest Economics Association. She was formerly an editor of the Journal of Labor Economics and an associate editor of the Journal of Economic Perspectives and Labour Economics. She serves or has served on numerous editorial boards, including the American Economic Review, the Journal of Labor Economics, the Journal of Economic Perspectives, the ILR Review, the Journal of Labor Research, and The Annals of the American Academy of Political and Social Science, among others.

== Awards ==
- 2001 The Carolyn Shaw Bell Award, awarded by the American Economic Association Committee on the Status of Women in the Economics Profession for furthering the status of women in the economics profession.
- 2002 Richard A. Lester Prize for the outstanding book in labor economics and industrial relations for At Home and Abroad: U.S. Labor Market Performance in International Perspective (with Lawrence Kahn).
- 2003 Fellow (Founding Fellow), Society of Labor Economists.
- 2005 Eleanor Roosevelt Fellow, American Academy of Political and Social Science.
- 2009 Academic Fellow (Inaugural Fellow), Labor and Employment Relations Association.
- 2010 IZA Prize in Labor Economics
- 2017 Jacob Mincer Award for Lifetime Contributions to the Field of Labor Economics by the Society of Labor Economists (SOLE).
- 2017 Judge William B. Groat Alumni Award, ILR School, Cornell University.
- 2018 Distinguished Fellow Award, American Economic Association.

== Selected publications ==
=== Books ===
- Blau, Francine D. (1977). Equal Pay in the Office. Lexington, Mass: Lexington Books. ISBN 978-0-669-01003-9. Archived from the original on 2009-12-03 – via Questia.
- Blau, Francine D.; Ehrenberg, Ronald G. (eds.) (1997). Gender and Family Issues in the Workplace. New York: Russell Sage Foundation. ISBN 978-0-87154-122-2.
- Blau, Francine D.; Kahn, Lawrence M. (2002). At Home and Abroad: U.S. Labor Market Performance in International Perspective. New York: Russell Sage Foundation. ISBN 978-0-87154-100-0.
- Eds. Blau, Francine D.; Brinton, Mary C.; Grusky, David B. (2006). The Declining Significance of Gender? New York: Russell Sage Foundation. ISBN 978-0-87154-092-8.
- Blau, Francine D.; Eds. Anne C. Gielen, and Klaus F. Zimmermann (2012). Gender, Inequality, and Wages. Oxford University Press. ISBN 978-0-19966-585-3.
- Eds. Blau, Francine D. and Christopher Mackie (2017). The Economic and Fiscal Consequences of Immigration. Washington, DC: The National Academies Press. ISBN 978-0-309-44445-3.
- Blau, Francine D.; Winkler, Anne E. (2022). The Economics of Women, Men, and Work (9th ed.). Oxford University Press. ISBN 9780197606148.
  - Blau, Francine D.; Winkler, Anne E. (2018). The Economics of Women, Men, and Work (8th ed.). Oxford University Press. ISBN 9780190620851.
  - Blau, Francine D.; Ferber, Marianne A.; Winkler, Anne E. The Economics of Women, Men, and Work. Upper Saddle River, NJ: Prentice-Hall, 3rd ed. 1998, 4th ed. 2002, 5th ed. 2006, 6th ed. 2010, 7th ed. 2014.
  - Blau, Francine D.; Ferber, Marianne A. The Economics of Women, Men, and Work. Englewood Cliffs, NJ: Prentice-Hall, 1st ed. 1986, 2nd ed. 1992.
