= Barry Hirsch =

American economist

Barry T. Hirsch (born 1949) is an American economist and the W.J. Usery Chair of the American Workplace at the Andrew Young School of Policy Studies of Georgia State University. Hirsch is one of the leading economists on the subject of industrial relations in the United States.

== Biography ==
After earning a B.A. and a Ph.D. in economics from the University of Virginia in 1972 and 1977, respectively, Barry Hirsch took up a position as assistant professor at the University of North Carolina at Greensboro. There, he was first promoted to associate professor and full professor in 1979 and 1983, before moving on to Florida State University (FSU) in 1990. Shortly after becoming Distinguished Research Professor at FSU, Hirsch changed to the position of E.M. Stevens Distinguished Professor at Trinity University (San Antonio, Texas), which he held until 2008. Finally, in 2008, Hirsch moved back to the East Coast by taking up the W.J. Usery Chair of the American Workplace at the Andrew Young School of Policy Studies of Georgia State University, which he has held ever since. Beyond his academic positions, Hirsch maintains affiliations with the Alfred P. Sloan Foundation, the IZA Institute of Labor Economics, and the Labor and Employment Relations Association. In terms of professional service, he performs editorial duties for the Journal of Labor Research, Industrial Relations, Southern Economic Journal, Industrial and Labor Relations Review, and the Atlantic Economic Journal.

== Research ==
Barry Hirsch's research revolves primarily around labour economics, especially industrial relations, labour legislation and unions in the United States. In terms of research output, he ranks among the top 3% of economists registered on IDEAS/RePEc. Key findings of his research include:

- How do unions affect firm profitability and economic performance? Together with Robert A. Connolly and Mark Hirschey, Hirsch finds that reduces firm profitability by sharing the returns to firm-specific intangible capital, and thus disincentives R&D investment. Specifically, Hirsch finds unionized U.S. firms in the 1970s to have, on average, 10-15% lower market value and earnings than non-unionized equivalents, which might contribute to the declining U.S. unionization in the 1980s. Overall, reviewing the evidence on union effects in the U.S. during the 1980s and 1990s, Hirsch concludes that unions effects have negatively affected the growth of U.S. firms, though without increasing their likelihood of business failure, and traces the breakdown of unions' role as workers collective voice in the U.S.
- Another strand of Hirsch's research concerns wage differentials. For instance, Hirsch and Macpherson find that U.S. wage levels in predominantly female occupations were substantially lower throughout 1973-93, though they argue that only a third of the gender composition effect of occupations cannot be accounted for by occupational characteristics and unmeasured worker skill or taste differences. With regard to part-time workers, Hirsch has argued that the gap in hourly wages between part-time and full-time workers is mostly due to differences between workers, especially in terms of skills that are built up more slowly for part-time workers. Finally, with regard to the union wage gap, in work with Edward Schumacher, Hirsch has highlighted that the gap between the wages of union and non-union workers in 1973-2001 was likely higher than estimated.
- Older workers in the U.S. faced particularly high barriers in the 1980s and 1990s in occupations with steep wage profiles, pension benefits and widespread computer use, with union coverage being a further cause of limitation for older and most older women concentrating in flex-time or part-time occupations.
- Most recently, work by Hirsch, Kaufman and Zelenska has drawn attention to the various channels through which employment adjusts to minimum wages, including through changes in prices, profits, wages, turnover and performance.

== Bibliography (selected) ==
- Hirsch, B.T., Addison, J.T. (1986). The Economic Analysis of Unions: New Approaches and Evidence. Milton Park, UK: Taylor & Francis.
- Hirsch, B.T., MacPherson, D.A. (2003). Union membership and coverage database from the current population survey: Note. ILR Review, 56(2), pp. 349–354.
