= Strange Justice (1999 film) =

1999 television film directed by Ernest Dickerson

- Promotional poster
- Genre: Political drama
- Based on: Strange Justice by: Jane Mayer; Jill Abramson
- Written by: Jacob Epstein
- Directed by: Ernest Dickerson
- Starring: Delroy Lindo; Mandy Patinkin; Regina Taylor; Paul Winfield
- Music by: William Jacobs
- Country of origin: United States
- Original language: English

Production
- Executive producers: Steven Haft; Jacob Epstein
- Producer: Jonathan Starch
- Cinematography: Jonathan Freeman
- Editor: Stephen Lovejoy
- Running time: 95 minutes
- Production company: Haft Entertainment

Original release
- Network: Showtime
- Release: August 29, 1999

Strange Justice is a 1999 American political drama television film directed by Ernest Dickerson, written by Jacob Epstein, and starring Delroy Lindo, Mandy Patinkin, Regina Taylor, and Paul Winfield. The film is based on the 1994 non-fiction book of the same name by Jane Mayer and Jill Abramson that covered the Clarence Thomas Supreme Court nomination. It aired on Showtime on August 29, 1999.

== Synopsis ==
Strange Justice is based on events regarding the sexual harassment accusation brought by Anita Hill (Regina Taylor) during the Senate confirmation hearings of Clarence Thomas (Delroy Lindo) for the United States Supreme Court during the George H. W. Bush presidential administration.

== Cast ==
- Delroy Lindo as Clarence Thomas
- Mandy Patinkin as Kenneth Duberstein
- Regina Taylor as Anita Hill
- Paul Winfield as Thurgood Marshall
- Louis Gossett Jr. as Vernon Jordan
- Stephen Young as Sen. Danforth
- Phillip Shepherd as Charles Goodman
- Mimi Kuzyk as Marion Gray
- Sherry Miller as Susan Deller Ross
- Julie Khaner as Julie Desavia
- Leila Johnson as Karen Hall
- Janet Land as Ginni Lamp Thomas
- Lisa Mende as Shirley Wiegand
- Karen Glave as Sondra Norris
- Barclay Hope as Tom Daniels
- Kathleen Laskey as Sydney Duberstein
- Maxine Guess as Angela Wright
- Richard Blackburn as John Sununu
- Bob Clout as A. B. Culvahouse
- Richard Fitzpatrick as Boyden Gray
- Fred Caplan as Chief Justice Rehnquist
- Panou as Gary Lee
- Barry Hirsch as Mike Gendler
- Sandi Stahlbrand as Jessica Gendler
- Philip Akin as Charles Ogletree
- Philip Craig as George Mitchell
- Caroly Larson as Andrea Sheldon
- David Kirby as Jerry Barrels
- Barry Flatman as Agent Allard

== Production ==
The film was shot on location in Los Angeles and Toronto.

== Awards and nominations ==
Year	Award	Result	Category	Recipient
2000	American Cinema Editors	Nominated	Best Edited Motion Picture for Non-Commercial Television	Stephen Lovejoy
2000	American Society of Cinematographers	Nominated	Outstanding Achievement in Cinematography in Movies of the Week/Mini-Series	Jonathan Freeman
2000	Black Reel Awards	Nominated	Network/Cable - Best Film	-
2000	Black Reel Awards	Nominated	Network/Cable - Best Director	Ernest R. Dickerson
2000	Black Reel Awards	Nominated	Network/Cable - Best Actress	Regina Taylor
2000	Black Reel Awards	Nominated	Network/Cable - Best Actor	Delroy Lindo
2000	Peabody Award	Won	-	-
2000	Satellite Award	Nominated	Best Performance by an Actress in a Miniseries or a Motion Picture Made for Television	Regina Taylor
2000	Satellite Award	Nominated	Best Performance by an Actor in a Miniseries or a Motion Picture Made for Television	Delroy Lindo
2000	Satellite Award	Won	Best Motion Picture Made for Television	-
