= MILR =

MILR may refer to:

- Master of Industrial and Labor Relations, a professional degree at Cornell University (see Cornell School of Industrial and Labor Relations#Graduate programs)
- Michigan LambdaRail (abbreviated MiLR), a computer network based at University of Michigan (see University of Michigan#Research)
