= Jean Trepp McKelvey =

American economist

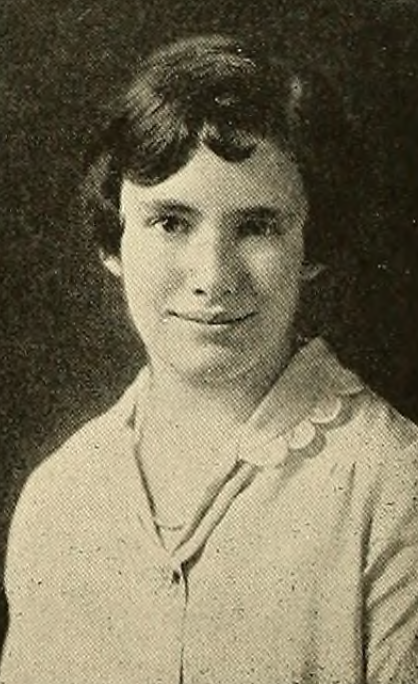
- Jean Trepp McKelvey, from the 1929 yearbook of Wellesley College
- Born: Jean Carol Trepp; February 9, 1908; St. Louis, Missouri
- Died: January 5, 1998 (aged 89); Rochester, New York
- Education: Wellesley College (A.B.) 1929; Radcliffe College (M.A.) 1931; Radcliffe College (Ph.D.)1933
- Occupation: Economist
- Spouse: Blake McKelvey

Jean Trepp McKelvey (February 9, 1908 – January 5, 1998) was an American economist specialising in arbitration and industrial relations. McKelvey was an esteemed tenure professor at Sarah Lawrence College (1932–1945) and Cornell University (1946–1976) where at the latter she was a founding faculty member for the School of Industrial and Labor Relations (ILR School), developing the curriculum and teaching five courses including arbitration, labor law and labor practices. Coined the "mother of arbitration", in 1947 McKelvey was the first woman admitted to the National Academy of Arbitrators, in 1970 became its first woman president and established an arbitration training program for women and minorities. In addition to her successful published research career, McKelvey served on the New York State Board of Mediation (1955–1966) and Federal Services Impasses Panel (1979–1990) and received numerous accolades including the Federal Mediation and Conciliation Service's Special Award for Distinguished Service in Labor Management Relations (1973) and Arbitrator of the Year Award from the American Arbitration Association (1983).

== Education ==
McKelvey graduated with a Bachelor of Arts with honors from Wellesley College in 1929, majoring in economics and minoring in American history. She had initially intended on majoring in chemistry, but her father, a chemical engineer, insisted that it was not a field for women. As a distinguished scholar in liberal arts and science as well as demonstrating "good moral character", in her senior year she was elected to Phi Beta Kappa, the oldest and most prestigious academic honor society in the United States.

She went on to receive her Master of Arts degree in 1931 and her Doctor of Philosophy in 1933 jointly from Radcliffe College. While at Wellesley College, McKelvey took interest to labor and trade union productivity, selecting the topic "Trade Union Interest in Production" for an honors paper which she later expanded into her doctoral dissertation titled "AFL Attitudes Toward Production, 1900–1932". Her doctoral dissertation primarily sought to contextualise the American Federation of Labor's shift from disinterest in productivity pre WW1 to overwhelming concern for productive efficiency in the business period 1918-1930 and proposed that experiments in union-management cooperation from the late 1920s to early 1930s achieved success only as a result of highly unique circumstances and were unlikely to develop into typical or enduring features of labor-management relations. In her doctoral dissertation's publication, McKelvey's underpins the relevancy of the subject matter writing: "At that time considerable public interest was focused on various experiments in union-management cooperation which seemed to promise a veritable revolution in trade union thought and techniques."

While completing her dissertation she met Blake McKelvey (June 10, 1903 – September 13, 2000), another doctoral candidate and they were married on June 29, 1934.

== Career ==
McKelvey was an arbitration and industrial relations economist. Her research has been in the domain of labor-management, specialising in trade unionism and dispute settlement in the United States. The reception of McKelvey's contribution to her field of economics helped to form the unique characteristics of the US arbitration system and the development of economic policy.

=== Sarah Lawrence College (1932–1945) ===
Sarah Lawrence College was founded by William Van Duzer Lawrence and Henry Noble MacCracken in 1926 as a progressive and self-directive education institution mirroring John Dewey's "hands on" educational reform model. McKelvey began her university teaching career at Sarah Lawrence College in 1932. McKelvey's addition while the college was in its infancy along with the broader sociocultural shift in American society from conservatism to progressivism with respect to the role of the modern American woman, paved the way for her impact on the curriculum.

Initially teaching quotidian small courses including Economics I and II, Economic Behavior, Money and Banking, and Industrial Relations, McKelvey sought to introduce contemporary topics such as industrial unionism, wage regulation and compensation and trade union policy. In her Industrial Relations course, McKelvey integrated the implementation of the New Deal and the subsequent legalities of union behaviour. Seeing the functional relationship between classroom learning activities and real life experiences, McKelvey sought to revise the Sarah Lawrence curriculum to incorporate fieldwork. McKelvey believed that a holistic education should be both "practical and participatory" and introduced a number of activities to her courses including a field trip to the American Stock Exchange, United States Department of Labor hearings on minimum wage, a visit to a factory on strike and lunch with Eleanor Roosevelt.

McKelvey went on to develop Sarah Lawrence's now permanent Exploratory Courses - initially aimed with assisting first years in exploring fields of interest, allowing them to orient themselves in college and develop their academic potential. McKelvey's fieldwork experiences and curricular revision at Sarah Lawrence College inspired her publication "The Uses of Field Work in Teaching Economics" in 1939, which underpinned her belief that "traditional forms of instruction might be modified to suit the needs and interests of students" and the integration of fieldwork in teaching was integral in "preparing students for intelligent and effective participation in the civic life of their communities".

=== Cornell University (1946–1976) ===
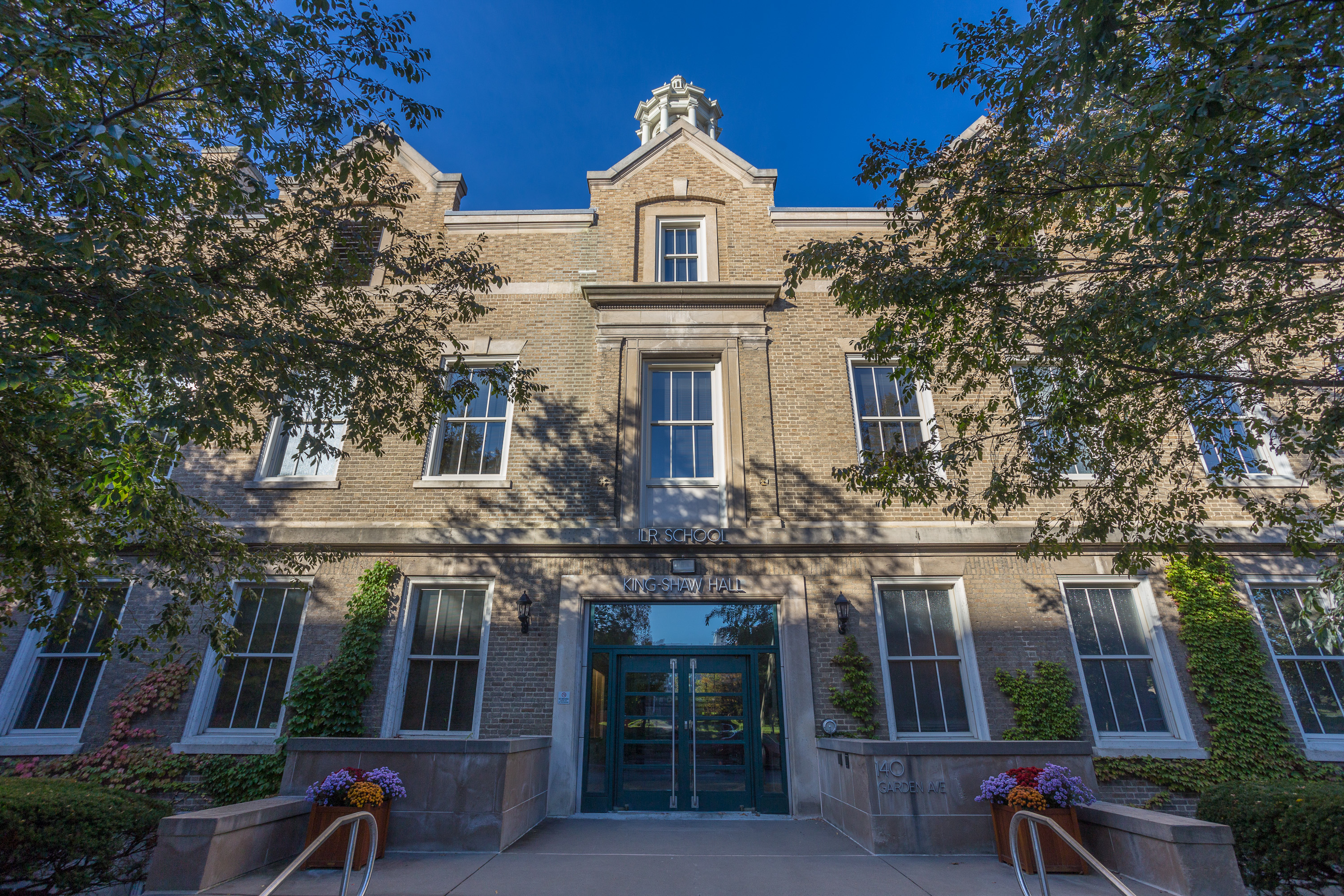
King-Shaw Hall, Cornell ILR School

McKelvey continued her university teaching career as an assistant professor at Cornell University in 1946, changing institutions due to the specialized curriculum and calibre of students attending. After a promotion to associate professor in 1947, McKelvey became a founding faculty member for the New York State School of Industrial and Labor Relations (ILR School), developing the curriculum and teaching five courses including arbitration, labor law and labor practices. McKelvey was promoted to Professor in 1951 and continued to develop the ILR School's fields of study and conduct scholarly research.

McKelvey retired professor emeritus in 1976, endowed with the Jean McKelvey-Alice Grant Professorship of Labor-Management Relations - the ILR School's first fully endowed chair honoring the school's first generation of faculty. After taking her official retirement, McKelvey launched and managed Cornell's ILR Extension division teaching off-campus graduate courses in Syracuse, Albany, Corning, Elmira and Rochester.

=== National Academy of Arbitrators (1947–1998) ===
In 1947 McKelvey became the first woman admitted to the National Academy of Arbitrators, the honorary and professional organization of arbitrators in the United States and Canada. Rigorous admission standards rooted in the principles of integrity and competence ensure a high calibre of members. These members preside over thousands of labor and employment arbitration cases across private, public and non-profit sectors, as well as work cooperatively with institutions, agencies and governments.

In 1970 McKelvey became the academy's first woman to be elected president. When McKelvey's term ended, she was presented with a gavel inscribed, "To Jean T. McKelvey, President, 1970, With the Affection and Esteem of His Colleagues", and notably chose not to change the inscription. In a field dominated by men, McKelvey recalls her first arbitration wherein she "walked into the room and there was nothing but men there; one looked up and said, 'Oh, you're the secretary' and I said, 'No, I'm the arbitrator'." McKevley also reported that her gender-neutral first name led to her being selected to arbitrate cases more often than any of her female peers and arbitration parties were often surprised as they were expecting a man.

Unsatisfied by the underrepresentation of women in the academy and the field more broadly, in 1978 McKelvey established an arbitration training program for women. This paved the way for successive women academy presidents Clare B. McDermott (1979) and Eva Robins (1980). Her colleague at the ILR School and co-member of the National Academy of Arbitrator, Alice Grant, said "We have more women arbitrators (in Rochester) than in any other city in the country, and the reason for that is Jean McKelvey".

After McKelvey's passing, Milton Rubin, the current president of the National Academy of Arbitrators, said "We are the poorer for her passing, but her influence will live on for many years".

=== Various industry positions (1944–1998) ===
In addition to her teaching duties, McKelvey was a sought-after arbitrator, operating a successful nationwide practice. One of McKelvey's key areas of dispute resolution was in the airline industry where she was retained as an arbitrator for United Airlines, Hawaiian Airlines and Trans World Airlines (TWA).

In 1944 McKelvey served as a public panel member through her factory and union work at General Motors, became a hearing officer and later was appointed to the National War Labor Board (1944–1945), specifically Regional Administrative Board II. Established by US President Franklin D. Roosevelt, the National War Labor Board was a temporary organization that sought to mediate labor disputes during World War II. McKelvey presided over fifty cases, predominantly in wage stabilization and labor dispute settlement across a number of industries including automobiles, airlines and mining.

In 1955 McKelvey was named to the New York State Board of Mediation (1955–1966) by New York Governor William Averell Harriman. The New York State Board of Mediation is tasked with the settlement of labor disputes between employers and employees, particularly with respect to unfair labor practices and enforcing rights. During her tenure on the board, McKelvey helped resolve numerous disputes, including the wholesale butchers' walkout and multi-day strike in 1961.

In 1960 McKelvey was appointed to the Public Review Board of the United Auto Workers (UAW) (1960–1998), serving as acting chair from 1973 to 1974. The Public Review Board of the UAW is tasked with upholding the moral and ethical standards in the administrative and operative practices of the International Union including democratic processes and appeal procedures, with respect to members and subordinate bodies. In recognition of McKelvey's distinct contributions spanning four decades she was awarded posthumously awarded the UAW Social Justice Award. The bronze plaque acknowledged McKelvey as being "a woman of unsurpassed integrity, an influential teacher and scholar, and a steadfast defender of the right of working people to organize and bargain collectively" and a "wonderful friend of the UAW".

In 1970 McKelvey was appointed to the Federal Services Impasses Panel (1979–1990) by US President Richard Nixon. The Federal Services Impasses Panel is responsible for resolving resolves impasses between federal agencies and unions when bargaining and mediation does not suffice. McKelvey was one of nine presidential appointees serving on a part-time basis.

== Works and publications ==
McKelvey was a productive scholar, publishing several books, articles and monographs over the course of her academic career. Given this, McKelvey has a strong literary legacy and authority across a number of areas including trade unionism, collective bargaining and arbitration.

Her published works, as listed below, were held in high esteem being exhibited by a number of prestigious publications including the Arbitration Journal, the Cornell Law Quarterly, ILR Research, and the Industrial and Labor Relations Review.

=== List of books ===
- McKelvey, T J. (1953). Dock Labor Disputes in Great Britain a Study in the Persistence of Industrial Unrest. New York State School of Industrial and Labor Relations.
- McKelvey, T J. & Wallen, S. (1955). Arbitration Today. BNA Incorporated.
- McKelvey, T J. (1956). Management Rights and The Arbitration Process. BNA Incorporated.
- McKelvey, T J. (1957). Critical Issues in Labor Arbitration. BNA Incorporated.
- McKelvey, T J. (1957). The Profession of Arbitration; selected papers from the first seven annual meetings of the National Academy of Arbitrators, 1948-1954. BNA Incorporated.
- McKelvey, T J. (1977). Duty of Fair Representation. I.L.R. Press.
- McKelvey, T J. (1988). Cleared for Takeoff: Airline Labor Relations Since Deregulation. I.L.R. Press.
- McKelvey, T J. (1985). The Changing Law of Fair Representation. I.L.R. Press.
- Lawler, E J., Neufeld M F. & McKelvey, T J. (1998). Industrial Relations At the Dawn of the New Millennium. I.L.R. Press.

=== Selected academic writing ===
- Trepp, C J. (1933). Union-Management Co-operation and the Southern Organizing Campaign. Journal of Political Economy.
- Trepp, C J. (1939). The Uses of Field Work in Teaching Economics. Bronxville N.Y: Sarah Lawrence College.
- McKelvey, T J. (1952). AFL Attitudes Toward Production, 1900–1932. Cornell University ILR School.
- McKelvey, T J. (1952). Trade Union Wage Policy in Postwar Britain. Industrial and Labor Relations Review.
- McKelvey, T J. (1971). Sex and The Single Arbitrator. Industrial and Labor Relations Review.
- McKelvey, T J. (1976). New Challenges to Arbitration. Cornell University ILR School.

== Honors and awards ==
List of honors and awards
Year	Award	Institution
1973	Distinguished Service Award	Federal Mediation and Conciliation Service
1975	Distinguished Alumnae Award for Public Service	Wellesley College
1983	Arbitrator of the Year	American Arbitration Association
1989	Distinguished Service Award	Society of Professionals in Dispute Resolution
1990	Distinguished Service Award	Society of Federal Labor Relations Professionals
1998	Contributions to Social Justice Award	United Automobile Workers Union (UAW)
