= Cornell HR Review =

- Discipline: Human resource management
- Language: English

Publication details
- History: 2009-2019
- Publisher: The Cornell HR Review Association (United States)
- Frequency: Rolling

Standard abbreviations
- ISO 4: Cornell HR Rev.

Indexing
- OCLC no.: 617755647

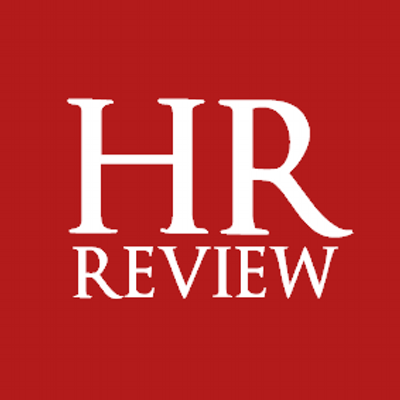
CHRR Logo

The Cornell HR Review (CHRR) was an online journal of human resource management articles published independently by graduate students at Cornell University. The publication ran from 2009 to 2019.

== History ==
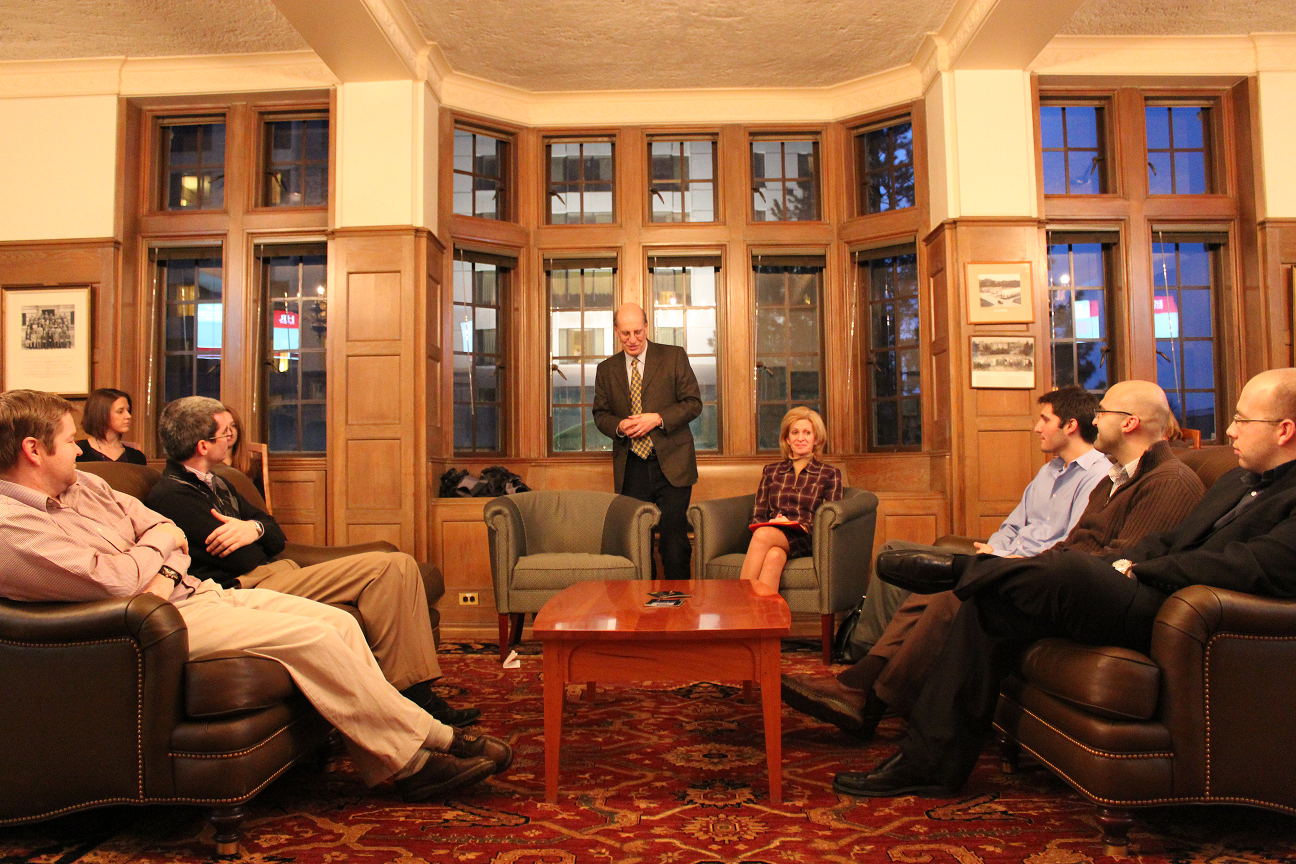
ILR dean Harry Katz addressing an event of the Cornell HR Review in 2011

The Cornell HR Review published its first article on December 21, 2009, and was the oldest operating student-edited human resources publication in the United States. It was founded by Cornell graduate student Jonathan E. DeGraff, with the financial support of Harry C. Katz, dean of the Cornell University School of Industrial and Labor Relations.

CHRR is digitally archived by Cornell's Martin P. Catherwood Library and is indexed by Princeton University Library and the National Library of Australia. Its articles have been cited by academic, practitioner, and popular news media outlets, including the Houston Chronicle, HowStuffWorks, and the Society for Human Resource Management.

== See also ==
- Industrial and Labor Relations Review
