= George Boyer =

American economist

George R. Boyer (born c. 1954) is Professor of Labor Economics in the School of Industrial and Labor Relations at Cornell University. He is best known for his work in the field of economic history, and in particular his research on the English poor laws of the 18th and 19th centuries.

== Career ==
Boyer received a B.A. in economics and history from the College of William and Mary in 1976 and a Ph.D. in economics from the University of Wisconsin in 1982.

Boyer has been a faculty member in Cornell University's School of Industrial and Labor Relations since 1982. He has also been a visiting professor in the Department of Economics at the University of Essex.

Boyer is associate editor of the Industrial and Labor Relations Review and has been a member of the editorial boards of the Journal of Economic History and of Social Science History.

== Research on the English Poor Laws ==
Boyer is arguably best known for his extensive research on the English poor laws, culminating in his 1990 book, An Economic History of the English Poor Law, 1750-1850 (published by Cambridge University Press).

Using tools and concepts from economics, Boyer explores in his book the political motivation for the adoption of poor laws in 18th century England, the geographic variation in poor relief administered during that period, and the demographic impacts of these laws. The book challenges many previously held beliefs about poor laws, and argues that the adoption of such laws was a rational response to changing conditions in agricultural England at the time.

In a review of the book published in the Journal of Economic Literature, Martha Olney observes that "Boyer follows the methodological precepts of what has long since stopped being the "new" economic history: explicit theorizing subjected to empirical testing with historical data" (page 1535). While Olney cautions that "it is unclear whether his results will stand up to the poking and prodding his models' assumptions call for" (page 1535–1536), she nonetheless argues that "Boyer has written a commendable book" (page 1535) and that "any student of contemporary or historical systems of poor relief is well advised to place this book near the top of her required reading" (page 1536).

In another review of the book published in the American Journal of Legal History, James W. Ely, Jr. notes that, "In his carefully reasoned monograph, George R. Boyer provides an economic assessment of the poor laws before 1834 and offers an revisionist account of relief policy" (page 340). While Ely highlights some shortcomings in the text, he concludes that "Boyer has authored a provocative work which contributes to the rich literature on the English poor laws. His economic analysis will be helpful to the study of English poor relief policies" (page 342).

In addition to his book on the subject, Boyer has written articles on various aspects of English poor relief in economics and history journals including the Journal of Political Economy, the Journal of Economic History, and Explorations in Economic History.

In more recent work, Boyer is exploring the evolution of social welfare policies in the UK in the 19th and 20th centuries.

== Works ==
=== Books ===
- An Economic History of the English Poor Law, 1750–1850, Cambridge University Press (1990) [Held in 528 libraries according to WorldCat].

=== Selected peer-reviewed journal articles ===
- "The Trade Boards Act of 1909 and the Alleviation of Household Poverty" (with Jessica S. Bean), British Journal of Industrial Relations, vol. 47, no. 2 (2009): pp. 240–264.
- "Poverty Among the Elderly in Late Victorian England" (with T. P. Schmidle), Economic History Review, vol. 62, no. 2 (2009): pp. 249–278.
- "Unemployment and the UK Labour Market Before, During and After the Golden Age" (with Timothy J. Hatton), European Review of Economic History, vol. 9, no. 1 (2005): pp. 35–60.
- "The Evolution of Unemployment Relief in Great Britain," Journal of Interdisciplinary History, vol. 34, no. 3 (2004): pp. 393–433.
- "New Estimates of British Unemployment, 1870-1913" (with Timothy J. Hatton), Journal of Economic History, vol. 62, no. 3: pp. 643–675.
- "The Development of the Neoclassical Tradition in Labor Economics" (with Robert S. Smith), Industrial and Labor Relations Review, vol. 54, no. 2 (2001): pp. 199–223.
- "The Historical Background of the Communist Manifesto," Journal of Economic Perspectives, vol. 12, no. 4 (1998): pp. 151–174.
- "The Influence of London on Labor Markets in Southern England, 1830-1914," Social Science History, vol. 22, no. 3, (1998): pp. 257–285.
- "Migration and Labour Market Integration in Late Nineteenth-Century England and Wales" (with Timothy J. Hatton), Economic History Review, vol. 50, no. 4 (1997): pp. 697–734.
- "Poor Relief, Informal Assistance, and Short Time During the Lancashire Cotton Famine," Explorations in Economic History, vol. 34, no. 1 (1997): pp. 56–76.
- "Labour Migration in Southern and Eastern England, 1861-1901" European Review of Economic History, vol. 1, no. 2 (1997): pp. 191–215.
- "The Union Wage Effect in Late Nineteenth Century Britain" (with Timothy J. Hatton and Roy Bailey), Economica, vol. 61, no. 4 (1994): pp. 435–446.
- "Malthus Was Right After All: Poor Relief and Birth Rates in Southeastern England," Journal of Political Economy, vol. 97, no. 1 (1989): pp. 93–114.
- "What Did Unions Do in Nineteenth Century Britain?," Journal of Economic History, vol. 48, no. 2 (1988): pp. 319–332.
- "The Poor Law, Migration, and Economic Growth" Journal of Economic History, vol. 46, no. 2 (1986): pp. 419–430.
- "An Economic Model of the English Poor Law Circa 1780-1834," Explorations in Economic History, vol. 22, no. 2 (1985): pp. 129–167.
