= Alexander Colvin =

Kenneth F. Kahn '69 Dean at Cornell University

Alexander J. Colvin is the Kenneth F. Kahn '69 Dean of the School of Industrial and Labor Relations at Cornell University. He is a scholar of mandatory employment arbitration in the United States. Colvin was appointed Dean of the ILR School, effective July 1, 2019.

Colvin studied astronomy and astrophysics at the University of Toronto, from which he graduated with a bachelor's degree in 1989. He received a Juris Doctor in 1992 and a master's degree in 1995, both also from the University of Toronto. He received a PhD from the School of Industrial and Labor Relations at Cornell University in 1999. From 1999 to 2008, Colvin was a professor at Pennsylvania State University. He has worked at Cornell University since 2008. From 2011 to 2016, he was the associate editor of the Industrial and Labor Relations Review.
