= CHRR =

CHRR may refer to:

- Centre for Human Rights and Rehabilitation, a human rights non-governmental organisation in Malawi
- Cornell HR Review, an online journal of human resources management scholarship published by graduate students at Cornell University
