= Lawrence Kahn =

Lawrence Kahn or Larry Kahn may refer to:

- Lawrence E. Kahn (born 1937), American judge
- Lawrence M. Kahn (born 1950), American professor at Cornell
- Larry Kahn (tiddlywinks) (born 1953/1954), American tiddlywinks champion
- Larry Kahn, sports broadcaster for Sports USA Radio Network
