= ILRR =

The acronym ILRR can refer to:

- Industrial and Labor Relations Review, a journal on industrial relations
- isolated locoregional recurrence of breast cancer
