= Eileen Appelbaum =

American economist

- Born: 1940 (age 85–86)
- Education: Temple University (BA, MA); University of Pennsylvania (MA, PhD)

Eileen Appelbaum (born June 13, 1940) is an American economist. She is the co-director of the Center for Economic and Policy Research and an expert in private equity and labor relations.

== Education ==
Appelbaum holds a PhD in economics from the University of Pennsylvania.

== Career ==
Her most recent book, Private Equity at Work: When Wall Street Manages Main Street, which she co-authored with Rosemary Batt, was a finalist for the Academy of Management's George R. Terry Book Award in 2016. She also co-wrote, with Ruth Milkman, Unfinished Business: Paid Family Leave in California and the Future of U.S. Work-Family Policy, published by Cornell University Press in 2013.
