= Rosemary Batt =

American economist

Rosemary Batt is the Alice Hanson Cook Professor of Women and Work Emerita at the Cornell University School of Industrial and Labor Relations (ILR) and a Professor in Human Resource Studies and International and Comparative Labor. She is the former co-editor-in-chief of Industrial and Labor Relations Review. Much of her writing focuses on human resources, jobs, and wage and employment outcomes. She is also a senior research fellow at CEPR, and has held visiting academic positions at many different institutions, some of which include: Warwick University, Manchester University, and the Danish Technical Institute.

Batt's education included: Ph.D. 1996, MIT Sloan School of Management; M.A. 1981, Anthropology, University of Kentucky, Lexington, Kentucky; and B.A. 1973, History, Cornell University

== Publications ==
- Eileen Appelbaum, Rosemary Batt. 2014. Private Equity at Work: When Wall Street Manages Main Street. NY, NY, United States: Russell Sage Foundation, 2014.
- Rosemary Batt, Stephen Ackroyd, Paul Thompson, Pamela Tolbert. 2004. Oxford Handbook of Work and Organization. Oxford, UK, United Kingdom: Oxford University Press, 2004.
- Eileen Appelbaum, Rosemary Batt. 1994. The New American Workplace: Transforming Work Systems in the US. Ithaca, NY, United States: Cornell ILR Press. Third Printing, 1994.
- Eileen Appelbaum, & Rosemary Batt. (2022). Envision Healthcare Hits the Skids. The American Prospect.
