= Marion Gray =

American photographer

Marion Gray (September 14, 1934, Oakland, California – September 2, 2016, Mission District, San Francisco) was an American artist, photographer, and teacher. A vital member of the Bay Area art scene since the 1970s, Gray's "work blurs the lines between documentation and art, and exposes shared approaches between artists working in dance, performance and visual arts." During her long career, Gray documented the performances and works of artists such as John Cage, Christo and Jeanne Claude, Merce Cunningham, Joan Jonas, Marina Abramovic, Meredith Monk, Paul Dresher, Guerrilla Girls, and many others. As curator Christina Linden explains: "her photographs, themselves powerful works of art, constitute an immensely valuable archive of the ephemeral artistic activity the Bay Area has historically fostered.”

== Education and early work ==
In 1975 Gray completed her studies at the University of California, Berkeley in Art History and Art Practice. She studied with Peter Selz, Jim Melchert, Peter Voulkos, and Joan Brown.

It was during her final year that Gray attended a lecture by the artists Christo and Jeanne Claude who were discussing their upcoming project for Marin and Sonoma counties, the "Running Fence." She was hired to work with the Christos on the project in 1976. The project proved to be the beginning of her career, as she documented the "Running Fence," using still and moving cameras.

== Career ==
During her 40-year career, Gray developed an archive of work which captured historic and often one-time performances by some of the most important artists of the Bay Area.

As Photograph Magazine states, "Gray’s position in these pictures is active; she treats each shot as if she were an art-world photojournalist. The best works seem almost collaborative, in that the photographer harnesses the energy of the artists and works she depicts."

== Publications and exhibitions ==
Gray's work has appeared in various magazines and books including Art in America, Art Forum, Leonardo Music Journal, High Performance, Art in the San Francisco Bay Area 1945 to 1980, and Woman in Technology 2003, as well as both group and solo shows.

Exhibits include the San Francisco Art Institute "Marion Gray/Photographs of Actual Art," the Performing Arts Library and Museum, "In Performance – Tapestry," and "Resounding Works" at the Jazzova Sekce Gallery in Prague, Czech Republic.

In 2015 the Oakland Museum of California had a retrospective on Gray's work called Within The Light. The exhibition focused "on California artists (Terry Fox, Darryl Sapien, Robert Arneson, Survival Research Laboratories, William Wiley, Guillermo Gómez-Peña, Jim Melchert, Bonnie Ora Sherk, Keith Hennessy) and nationally acclaimed artists that have performed in the Bay Area (Ann Hamilton, Meredith Monk, Marina Abramovic and Ulay, Merce Cunningham, Eiko and Koma, Karen Finley)."
