= Harry C. Katz =

Provost of Cornell University (Interim)
- In office November 14, 2014 – July 31, 2015
- Preceded by: W. Kent Fuchs
- Succeeded by: Michael I. Kotlikoff

Personal details
- Born: March 11, 1951 (age 75) The Bronx, New York
- Spouse: Jan Hack Katz
- Children: 2
- Education: University of California, Berkeley (A.B., Ph.D.)
- Occupation: Professor of Collective Bargaining

Harry Charles Katz (born March 11, 1951) is an American university professor and academic administrator. He is the Jack Sheinkman Professor of Collective Bargaining at the Cornell University School of Industrial and Labor Relations. From November 14, 2014, to July 31, 2015, he served as the interim Provost of Cornell University. Katz currently serves as the Director of the Scheinman Institute on Conflict Resolution and a member of the United Auto Workers Public Review Board.

Katz was born in The Bronx, New York, and grew up in Northern California. He received an A.B. (1973) and Ph.D. (1977) in Economics from the University of California, Berkeley, after which he taught at MIT until 1985. He then went to Cornell, was appointed the Kenneth F. Kahn Dean of the Cornell University School of Industrial and Labor Relations in 2005, and became the interim Provost in 2014.

His research focuses on new structures for labor-management relationships in the United States, and his work argues the need for a more cooperative system. He is an expert on labor relations in the automobile and telecommunications industries both in the U.S. and abroad, and is often invited to lecture about those industries and about current labor-management relationships in general.

Katz is the author of several books, including Shifting Gears: Changing Labor Relations in the U.S. Automobile Industry, The Transformation of American Industrial Relations, Converging Divergences: Worldwide Changes in Employment Systems, and the widely used textbook An Introduction to Collective Bargaining and Industrial Relations.

In 2012, Katz was named a Scholar Fellow by the Labor and Employment Relations Association. He is the current Past President of the International Labor and Employment Relations Association
