= Journal of Labor Research =

- Discipline: Social Sciences
- Language: English

Publication details
- History: 1979 to present
- Publisher: Springer in cooperation with the John M. Olin Institute at George Mason University
- Frequency: Quarterly
- Impact factor: 1.4 (2024)

Standard abbreviations
- ISO 4: J. Labor Res.

Indexing
- ISSN: 0195-3613 (print); 1936-4768 (web)
- OCLC no.: 1158775034

Links
- Journal homepage; SpringerLink

The Journal of Labor Research is a peer-reviewed academic journal which publishes articles regarding labor relations in the United States. Its articles cover the nature of work, labor-management relations, welfare-to-work, flexible employment, labor policy, regulation of labor unions, dispute resolution, and workplace grievance resolution. One issue each year is devoted to emerging topics. The target audience for the journal is academics, students, employers, and human resources managers.

The Journal of Labor Research was established in 1979 and is published quarterly by the Olin Institute for Employment Policy and Practice at the Department of Economics of George Mason University and by the Locke Institute.

According to the Journal Citation Reports, the journal has a 2024 impact factor of 1.4.
