= Industrial Relations (journal) =

- Discipline: Industrial relations, labor economics
- Language: English
- Edited by: Alex Bryson

Publication details
- History: 1961–present
- Publisher: John Wiley & Sons
- Frequency: Quarterly
- Impact factor: 2.371 (2020)

Standard abbreviations
- ISO 4: Ind. Relat.

Indexing
- CODEN: IDRLAP
- ISSN: 1468-232X
- LCCN: 63043233
- OCLC no.: 01697206

Links
- Journal homepage; Online access; Online archive

Industrial Relations: A Journal of Economy and Society is a quarterly peer-reviewed economics journal covering industrial relations and labor economics. It was established in 1961 and is published by John Wiley & Sons on behalf of the UC-Berkeley Institute for Research on Labor and Employment, of which it is the official journal. The editor-in-chief is Alex Bryson (University College London). According to the Journal Citation Reports, the journal has a 2020 impact factor of 2.371, ranking it 15th out of 30 journals in the category "Industrial Relations & Labor".
