= New York State School of Industrial and Labor Relations at Cornell University =

School within Cornell University

Coordinates: 42.448510°N 76.478620°W

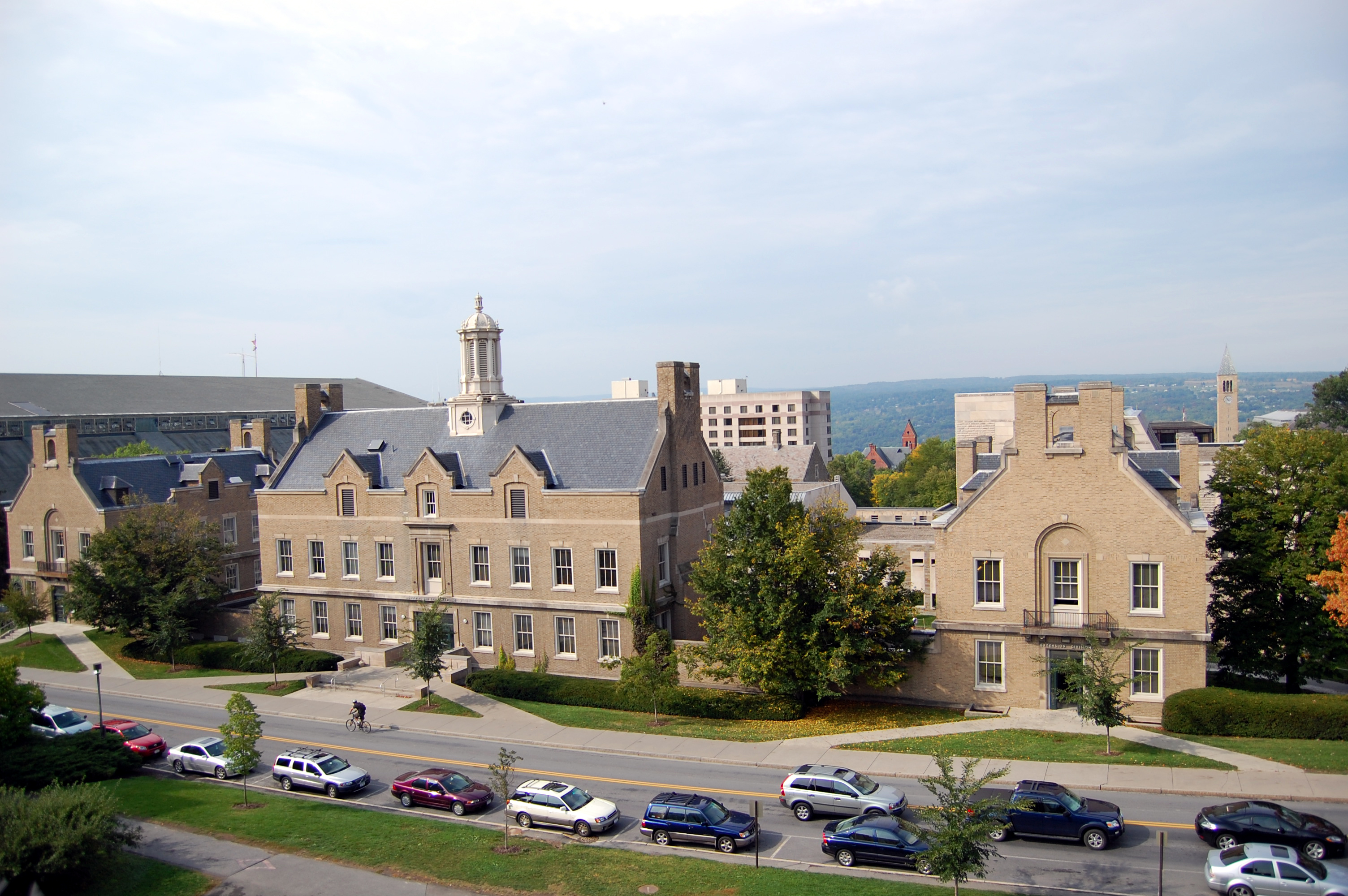
- The New York State School of Industrial and Labor Relations at Cornell University in September 2007
- Type: Statutory
- Established: 1945; 81 years ago
- Affiliations: Cornell University; State University of New York
- Dean: Alexander Colvin
- Faculty: 77
- Undergraduates: 1000
- Location: Ithaca, New York, U.S.
- Website: ilr.cornell.edu

The New York State School of Industrial and Labor Relations at Cornell University (ILR) is an industrial relations school and one of Cornell University's statutory colleges. The school has five academic departments which include: Labor Economics, Human Resource Management, Global Labor and Work, Organizational Behavior, and Statistics & Data Science.

Established by the state legislature in 1945, the school is a statutory or contract college through the State University of New York (SUNY) system and receives funding from the State of New York. It was the world's first school for college-level study in workplace issues and remains as one of the leading institutions for industrial relations. In addition to its undergraduate curriculum, the school offers professional and doctoral degrees, as well as executive education programs.

The current dean is Alexander Colvin.

== History ==
=== 20th century ===
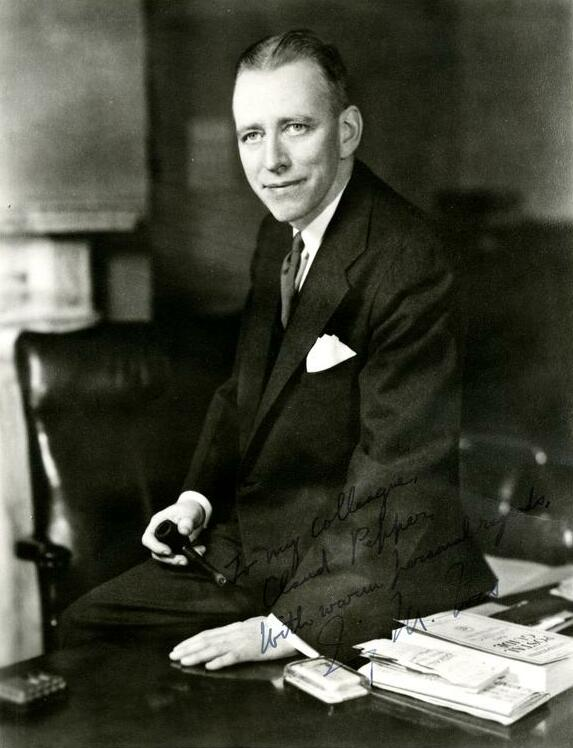
Irving Ives concurrently served as dean of ILR and as a U.S. Senator

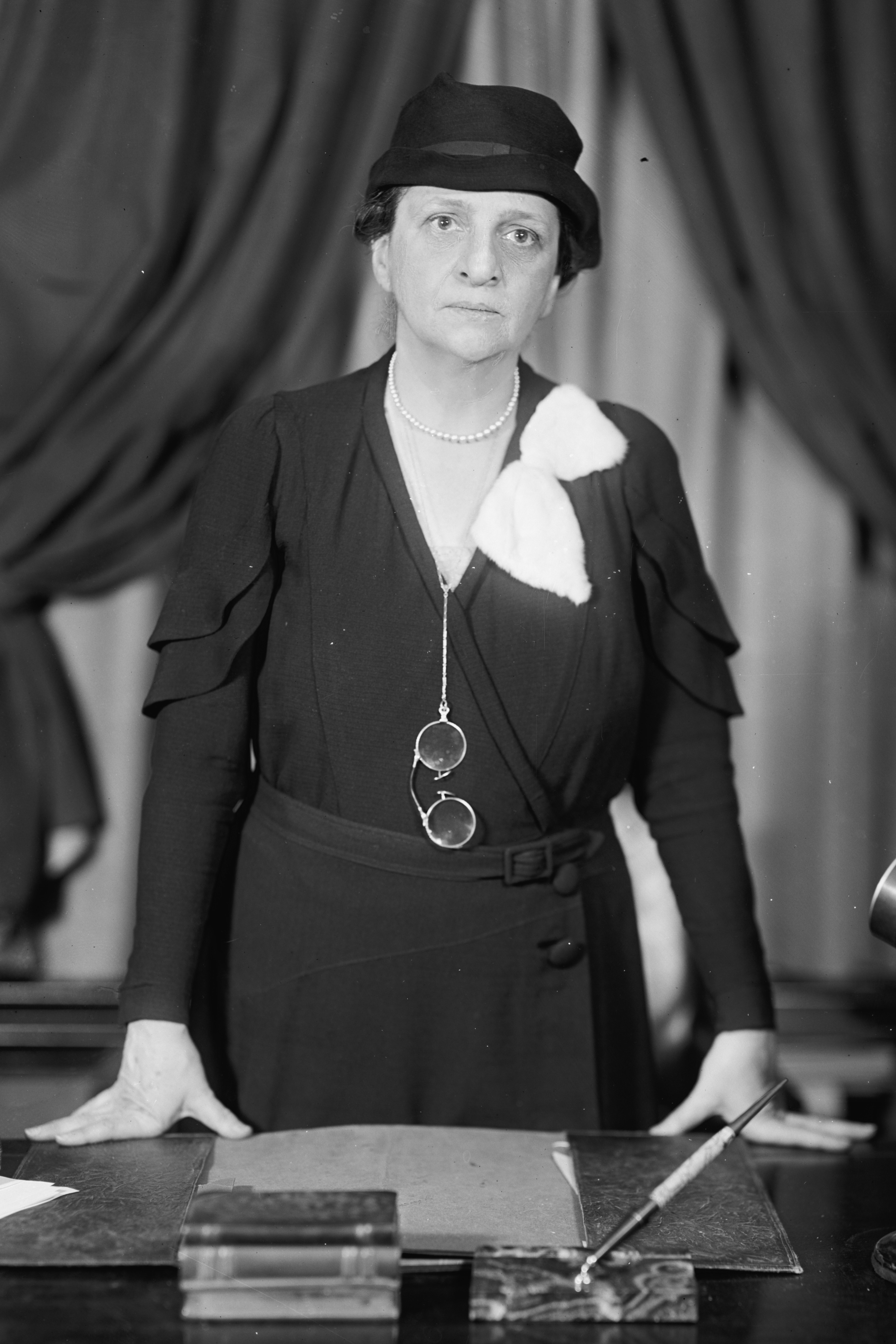
Frances Perkins, ILR professor from 1952 to 1965, was the first female U.S. Cabinet member

In 1944, a coalition of leaders in American business, industry, labor, government, and education formed to establish the school. They believed that a new type of school was needed that focused on issues involving the American workplace.

More specifically, the State Legislature established the school in 1945 based on the recommendations of the New York State Joint Legislative Committee on Industrial and Labor Conditions. This committee was headed by Irving M. Ives and was originally formed in 1938. Ives, along with others in the committee, determined that a fundamental dysfunction in the relationship between management and labor was that each group brought different technical information and skills to the negotiating table and that these differences were hindering the formation of mutually favorable outcomes. The committee’s response to this observation was to recommend that the state of New York provide "a common training program" for representatives of labor and management. The committee stressed that the importance of such a training program is "not merely attendance at the same institution or in the same school, but rather mutual and cooperative analysis of the problems common to both groups." Indeed, a quote from the committee’s 1943 report adds, "The Committee believes [however] that a state-sponsored school in this state should be based upon a broader educational philosophy. One of the most important ways of improving industrial and labor relations is to bring together, in a common training program, representatives of both labor and industry."

It was the committee’s recommendation to provide common training to leaders from all perspectives of the management-labor debate. It was hoped that this common training would stabilize the negotiating table by producing leaders on all sides who have common technical information and competencies. In 1942 the committee recommended that ILR be established at Cornell (the state’s land grant institution). Two years later, formal legislative action was taken and Governor Dewey approved establishing the school.

On July 1, 1945, ILR became a going educational enterprise, charged with the mission "to improve industrial and labor conditions in the State through the provision of instruction, the conduct of research, and the dissemination of information in all aspects of industrial, labor, and public relations, affecting employers and employees."

Ives was the first dean of the school. However, soon after gaining this title he became a United States Senator for New York and left for Washington. Beginning in the summer of 1947, Martin P. Catherwood became the dean. The school was also championed by then-President of Cornell University, Edmund Ezra Day. The state of New York provided the school with generous funding. However, due to time constraints, the school soon moved into quonset huts on the Ithaca campus and later into buildings vacated by the New York State College of Veterinary Medicine.

In 1960, enrollment in the ILR school was reported to consist of 300 undergraduates and 60 graduates.

Milton R. Konvitz, who was a labor-law expert, was a founding faculty member and remained active until his death in 2003. Frances Perkins, who served as Secretary of Labor for 12 years under Franklin D. Roosevelt, joined the faculty and served until her death in 1965.

The school offered the first 4-year degree (B.S.) in the field of industrial and labor relations. Originally, students had ninety-seven of the required 120 hours prescribed for them. The first two years consisted of many social science classes such as American history and government, sociology, psychology, economics, and law. Students were required to take English and public speaking courses as well as courses in accounting and statistics. The last two years of coursework were the technical core: classes that were expected to provide the students with the technical skills and competencies which enable them to develop professional expertise within the field of industrial and labor relations. Examples of these courses include: history of labor and labor-union organization and management, business organization and management, and corporate finance. Beyond the classroom, students were expected to gain applied experience. This was achieved primarily through a required summer work-training program. To fulfill this expectation, students would spend three of their summers working in the field for each of the following types of organizations: industrial or commercial, government, and labor.

=== 21st century ===
In 2012, ILR opened the International HRM Academy in collaboration with King's College London. In 2026, the Scheinman Institute on Conflict Resolution, a research institute housed within the ILR School, acquired the Labor Arbitration Institute. The acquisition expanded the ILR School's involvement in training labor arbitrators.

== Campus ==
1. Ives Hall; 2. Ives West Hall; 3. Ives East Hall; 4. Dolgen Hall; 5. King Shaw Hall; 6. ILR Research Building

Between its founding in 1945 and 1960, the school was housed in temporary quarters in quonset huts on the engineering quadrangle. Original plans called for an I&LR school to be built behind Phillips Hall on part of Hoy Field, but these plans were rejected by school alumni. Between 1959 and 1961, a new ILR quadrangle was constructed using state funds on land formerly occupied by the Cornell College of Veterinary Medicine. Three Veterinary College buildings including James Law Hall were demolished in September 1959. Four existing Veterinary college buildings were renovated. Of these, the 1911 building housing the ILR Conference Center (and renamed King-Shaw Hall in 2012) is listed on the register of historic structures.

The main campus occupies a quad near the center of Cornell, comprising an academic building, a research building, an extension building, a conference center, and a library. Ives Hall, named after ILR founding dean Irving Ives, is the academic building and is divided into a classroom/student wing and a faculty wing. The student wing houses separate lounges for undergraduate and graduate students. Also on the quad is the Martin P. Catherwood Library, which is one of only two official depository libraries of the International Labour Organization (the other being the Library of Congress). The ILR Conference Center, with its distinctive belfry atop, hosts special training sessions and recruiting events and offices for the United Auto Workers. The research building houses the Scheinman Institute on Conflict Resolution as well as offices for the ILR Review. The extension building, renamed Dolgen Hall in 2008, houses the Yang Tan Institute. All of these buildings are owned by New York State on land that Cornell conveyed to the state.

In 1998, New York State replaced the portion of Ives Hall fronting along Tower Road with a new 110,605 sq ft (10,275.5 m^{2}) building. Recently, the State also renovated the faculty wing of Ives Hall at a cost of $14 million, and in 2004, New York State completed extensive renovations of three other campus buildings.

The 1911 building which houses the ILR Conference Center was rededicated as Patricia G. and Rubén Jose King-Shaw, Jr. Hall in 2012.

Ithaca buildings
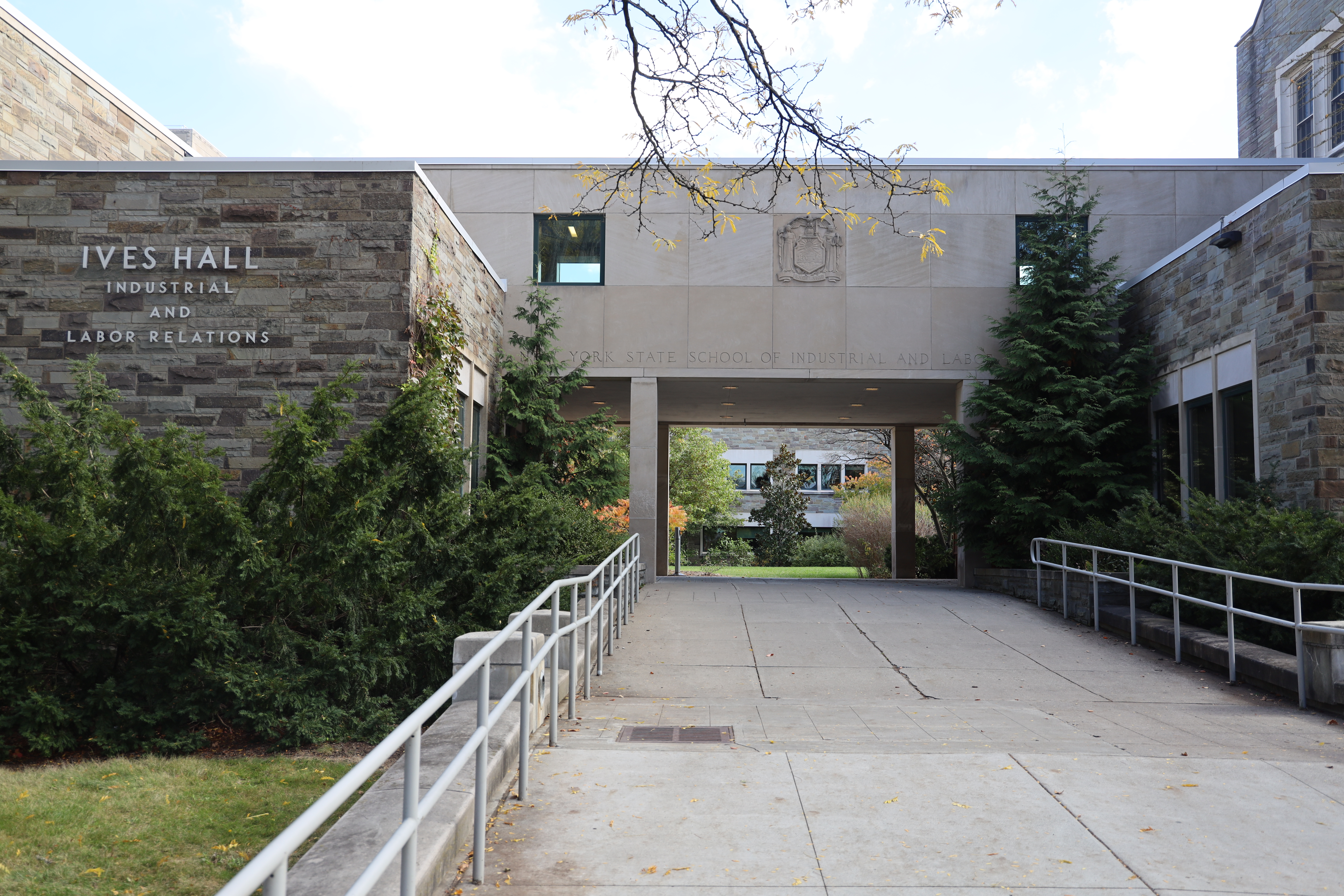
ILR Quadrangle entrance

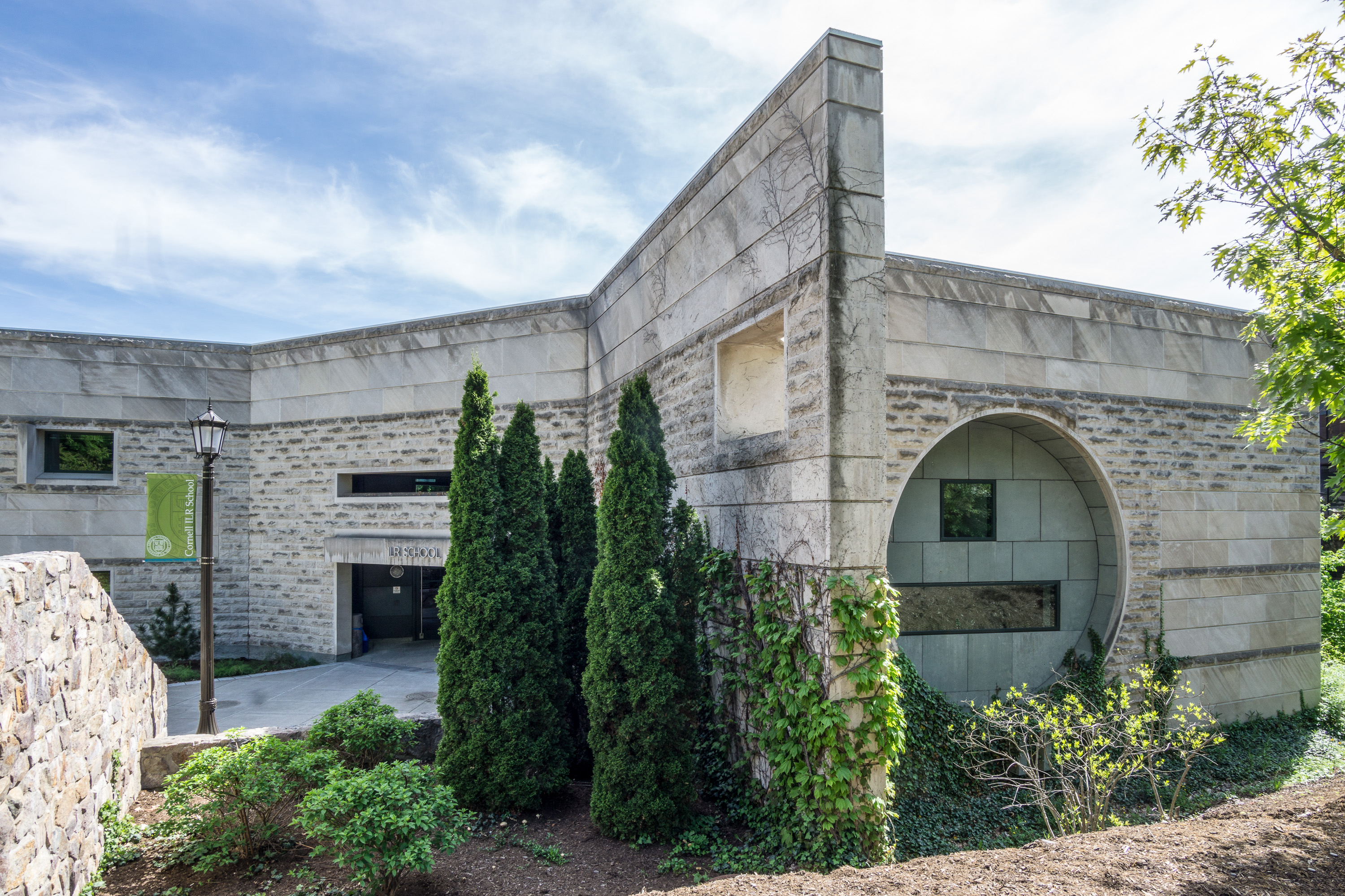
Ives Hall

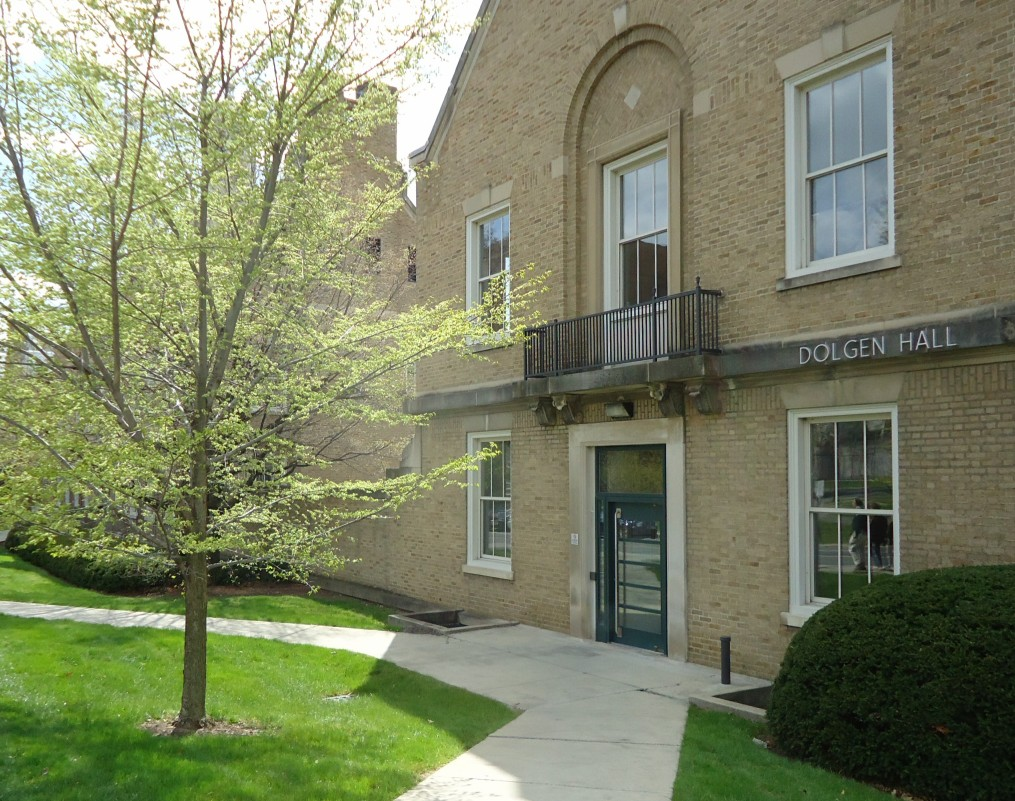
Dolgen Hall

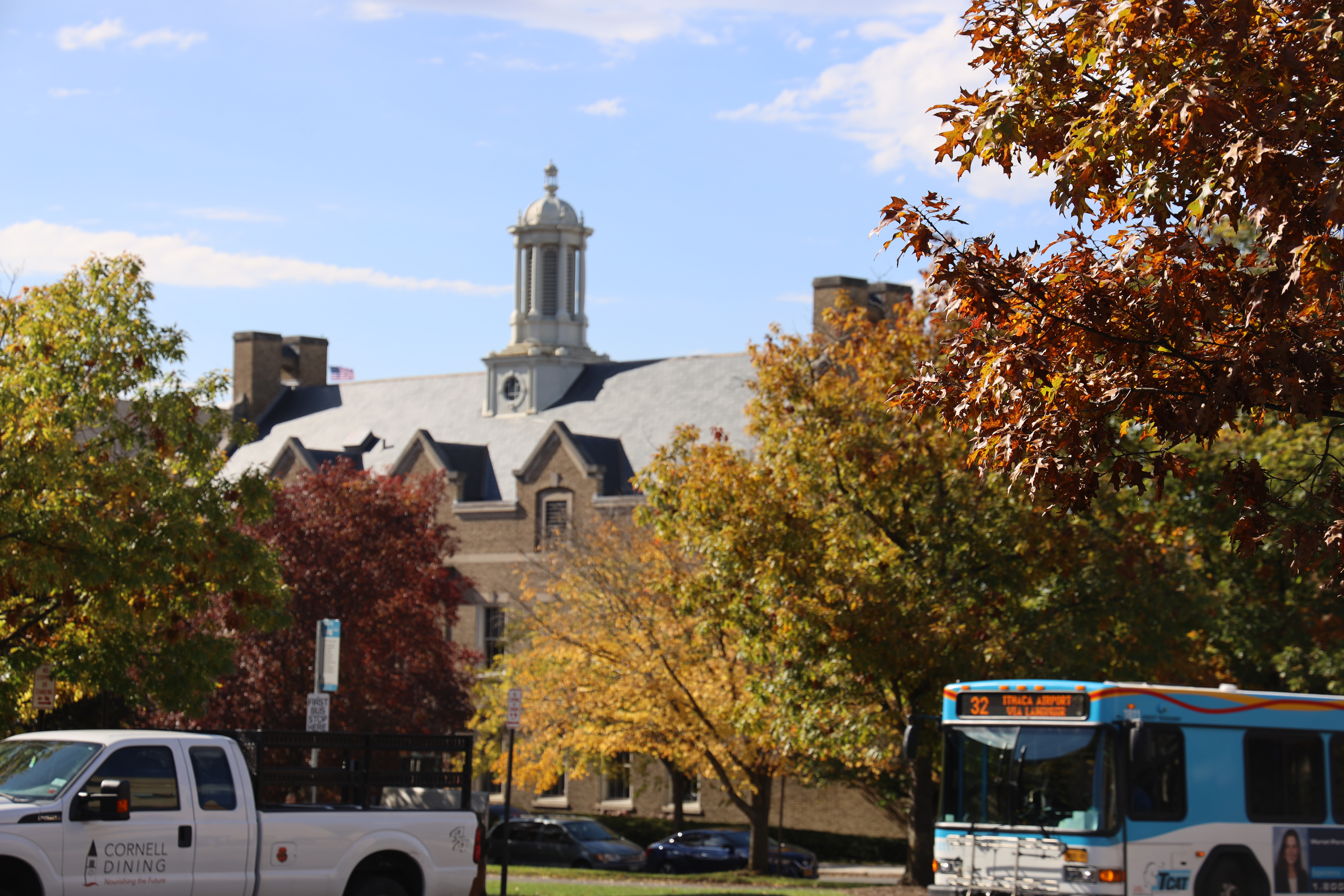
King Shaw Hall

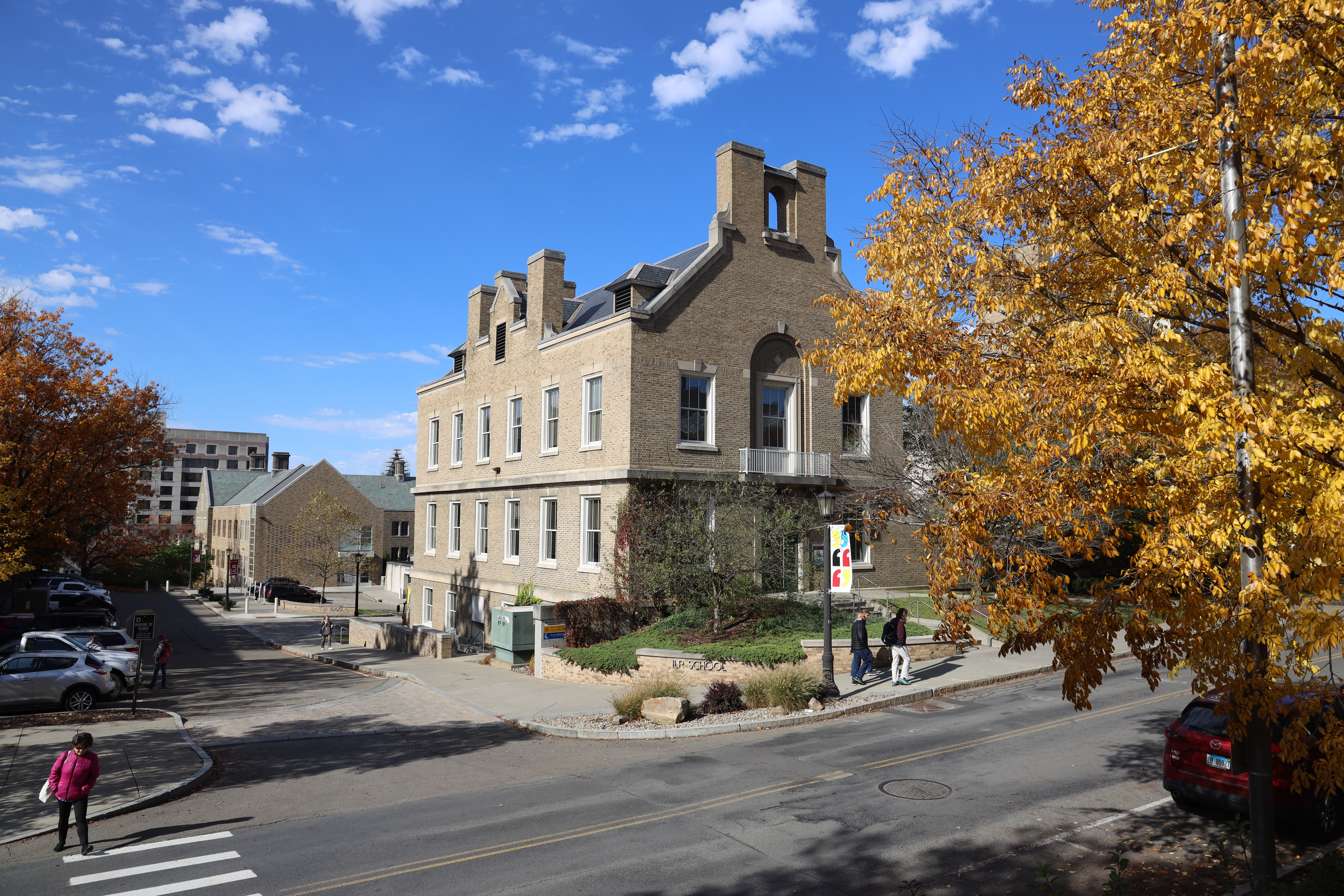
ILR Research Building

=== New York City and other locations ===
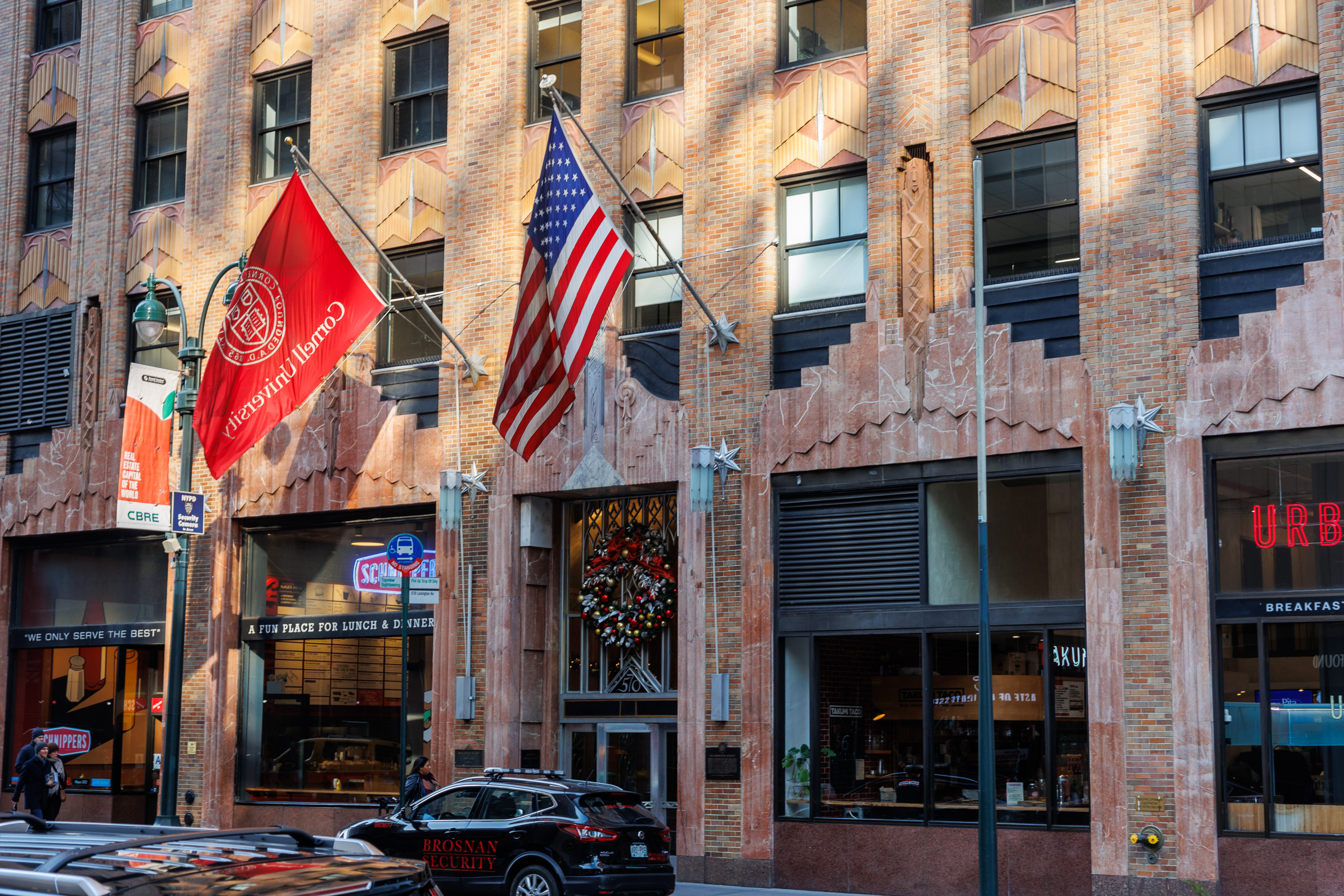
Seven ILR programs and institutes operate from the General Electric Building in Manhattan

ILR occupies 40,000 square feet of space in the General Electric Building at 570 Lexington Avenue in New York City for almost 100 staff. Seven ILR institutes and programs are based here, including the R. Brinkley Smithers Institute for Alcohol-Related Workplace Studies, The Worker Institute, ILR Executive Education, the Scheinman Institute on Conflict Resolution, the Labor and Employment Law Program, the Institute for Compensation Studies and the Institute for Workplace Studies. The 12th floor features a conference center and space for meetings, receptions, and classes.

ILR also has campuses in Albany, Buffalo, and Rochester, New York.

== Organization and degree programs ==
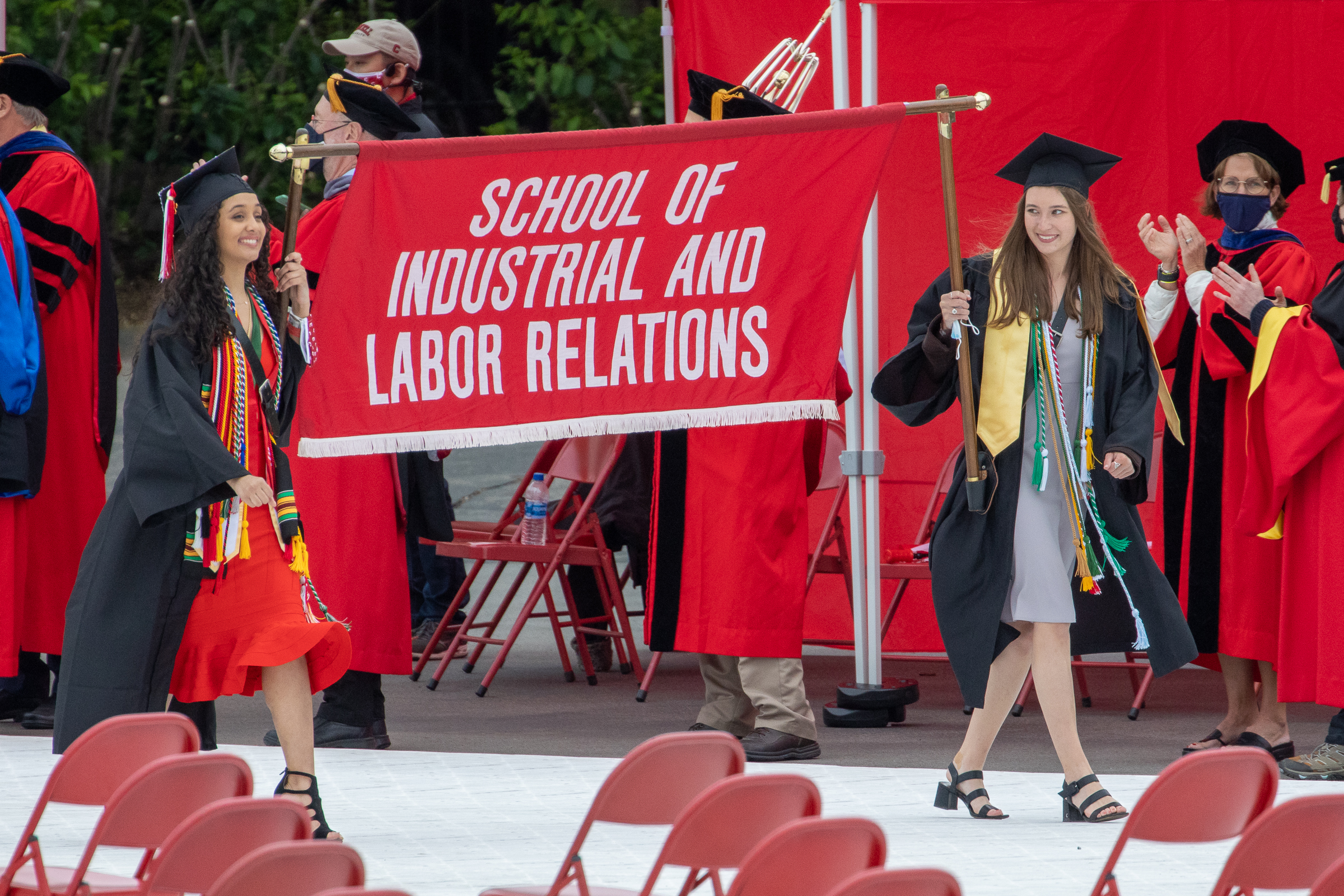
An ILR banner at commencement in 2021

The school is divided into six departments: Global Labor and Work, Human Resource Studies, Labor Economics, Organizational Behavior, and Statistics and Data Science.

=== Undergraduate programs ===
While most such schools offer only masters and PhD degrees in human resources or labor relations, Cornell is one of a few that offer a four-year undergraduate program focused on work and employment, the B.S. in Industrial and Labor Relations (BSILR). All students are required to complete a 120 credit hour curriculum with the following general requirements: First-year students are required to complete two writing seminars, Introduction to Organizational Behavior, Introduction to U.S. Labor History, as well as Introductory Microeconomics and Introductory Macroeconomics. Sophomore year students have the following course requirements: Introductory Statistics, Labor and Employment Law, Human Resource Management, Labor Relations, Economics of Wages and Unemployment, and an advanced writing course. Junior and Senior level students are required to take 24 credits from within the school's six departments. An additional 16 credits may be taken outside the school. Additionally, there is a physical education requirement of two classes. In 2016, 10 percent of undergraduates went on to attend law school and seven percent earn an MBA or other advanced degree. In 2010, of the 911 undergraduates, 406 (45%) were New York State residents at the time they matriculated. New York residents pay a reduced in-state tuition.

The school also sponsors a chapter of the Society for Human Resource Management (SHRM). The school's undergraduate contingent has claimed the national title at SHRM's HR Games twice—in 2002 and 2004. In 2011, a Cornell Daily Sun article rated ILR the "Sexiest Major" at Cornell: "The dreamy look in their eyes and the business-casual attire on their backs... They are the students who would have been in AEM except for the fact that they have souls. These students’ passion for the underdog and stunning good looks make ILR, hands down, the number one sexiest major at Cornell."

ILR School
Academic Departments

Global Labor and Work
Human Resource Studies
Labor Economics
Organizational Behavior
Statistics and Data Science

Undergraduates have a number of internship opportunities, including semester-long for-credit internships. The school also sponsors non-credit internships over the January break or during the summer. Students can also participate in the Arts College's Cornell-in-Washington program. Students in the top 20% of their junior class can write a senior thesis and thereby graduate with honors.

=== Graduate programs ===
Graduate-level degrees offered through the Graduate School include the Master of Industrial and Labor Relations (MILR), the dual MILR/Master of Business Administration (MBA) (joint with the Johnson School), the Master of Professional Studies (MPS), the Executive Master of Human Resource Management, the Master of Science (MS) in Labor Research & Policy, and the M.S./Ph.D.

Graduate students may also complete a semester abroad or a one-year-additional dual-degree Master in Management from ESCP Europe at any one of its campuses: Paris, Torino, Berlin, Madrid, or London. The school's contingent has claimed the title at the National MBA Human Capital Case Competition five times (the most of any school)—2007, 2012, 2013, 2014, and 2015.

=== Certificate programs ===
Through eCornell the school offers over 90 professional development certificate programs through online provision.

== Activities and publications ==
Since 1946, the school has participated in Cornell University's cooperative extension program, which reaches every county in the state. The school's extension program provides training and consulting services to both organized labor and management on contract negotiations, handling grievances, and employee relations.

The school's international program hosts scholars from other nations to conduct research in Ithaca as visiting fellows. Starting in 1952, the school conducted the Liberian Codification Project under the direction of Milton R. Konvitz.

The school also hosts:

- Center for Advanced Human Resource Studies (CAHRS)
- Cornell Higher Education Research Institute (CHERI)
- K. Lisa Yang and Hock E. Tan Institute on Employment and Disability (YTI)
- Institute for Compensation Studies (ICS)
- International Programs
- Labor Dynamics Institute
- Martin and Laurie Scheinman Institute on Conflict Resolution
- NYS AFL-CIO/Cornell Union Leadership Institute, which offers a one-year certificate programs for labor union leaders
- R. Brinkley Smithers Institute for Alcohol-Related Workplace Studies
- Worker Institute at Cornell

Since 1947, the school's faculty publishes a quarterly academic journal named the Industrial and Labor Relations Review. The school's Sports Business Society has also published the magazine Sports, Inc. since 2008.

== Notable people ==
=== Notable faculty ===
Current and former faculty include:

- Francine D. Blau (also ILR alumna), first female recipient of the IZA Prize
- George Boyer, an economic historian and scholar of the English Poor Laws
- Martin P. Catherwood, New York State Industrial Commissioner and labor arbitrator
- Ronald G. Ehrenberg, labor economist
- Erica Groshen, 14th Commissioner of the Bureau of Labor Statistics
- Harry C. Katz, labor relations and collective bargaining scholar
- Milton R. Konvitz, constitutional scholar
- Jean McKelvey, economist and labor arbitrator
- Maurice F. Neufeld, founding faculty member and union organizer
- U.S. Secretary of Labor Frances Perkins, the first female U.S. Cabinet member, the longest-serving (12 years) Secretary of Labor, witness to the Triangle Factory fire, and champion of both the Fair Labor Standards Act and the Social Security Act
- Paul Ortiz, labor historian
- Andy Stern, former President of SEIU, holds an appointment as the Alice B. Grant Labor Leader in Residence at the school
- Charles Tharp, former SVP of HR at Bristol-Myers Squibb and Saks

=== Notable alumni ===
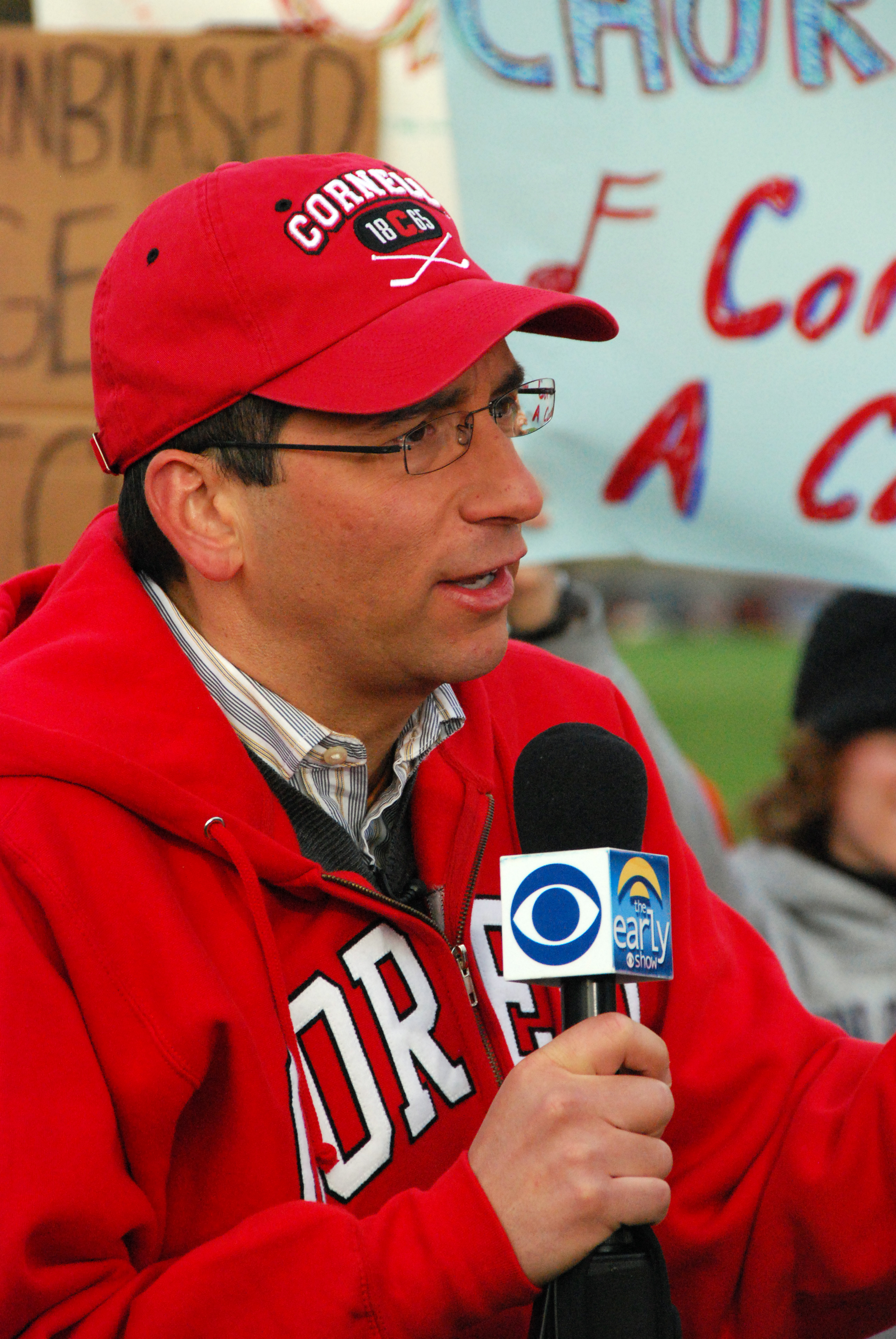
ILR alumnus and CBS Early Show reporter Dave Price '87, broadcasting from the Fall 2008 ILR Orientation

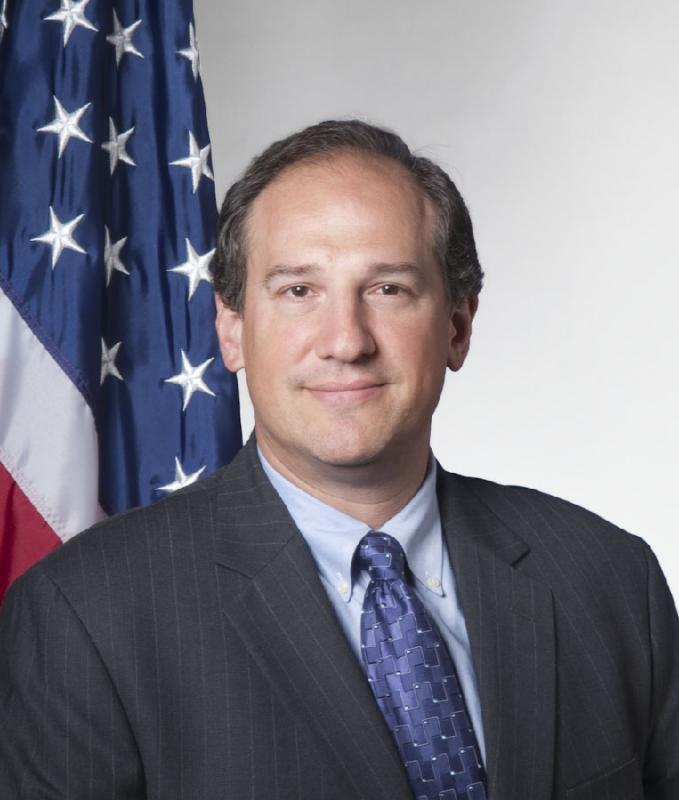
Seth Harris '83, the 11th United States Deputy Secretary of Labor

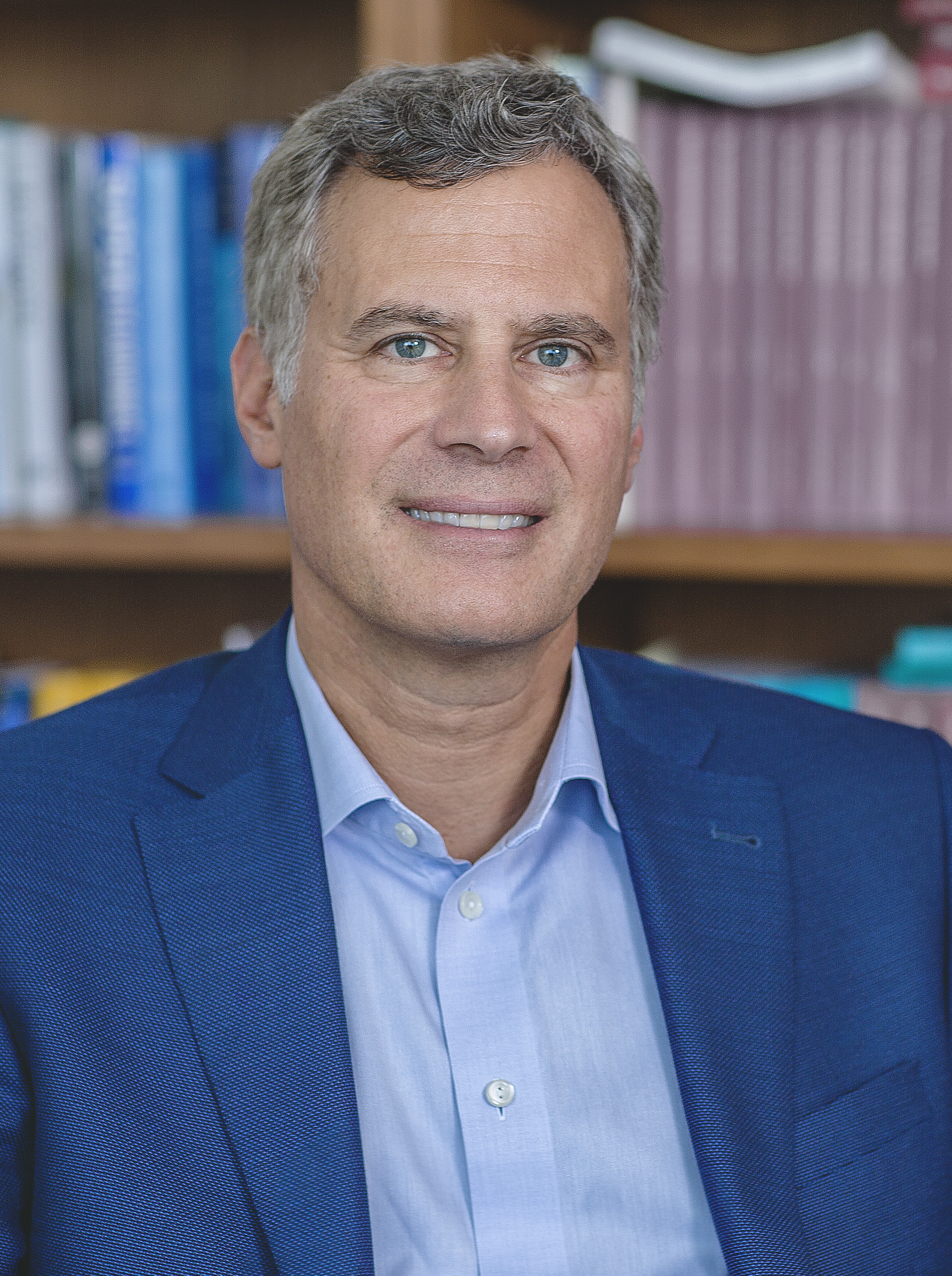
Alan Krueger '83, the 27th Chair of the Council of Economic Advisers

Academia

- Former Academy of Management President David A. Whetten (Ph.D. '74)
- Ohio State University provost Joseph A. Alutto (Ph.D.'68)
- Michael Goldsmith, former law professor at the BYU J. Reuben Clark Law School
- New York City Schools Chancellor Harold O. Levy ('74)

General management

- Priceline.com founder Jay S. Walker ('78)
- Parenting Magazine founder Robin Wolaner ('75)
- NFL Players Association President JC Tretter ('13)
- NHL Commissioner Gary Bettman ('74)
- MLB Commissioner Rob Manfred ('80)
- San Diego Padres General Manager A. J. Preller ('99)

Labor organizations

- President of UNITE HERE Bruce S. Raynor ('72)
- American Federation of Teachers President Randi Weingarten ('80)
- National Football League Players Association President (2020-2024), Executive Director (2026-present) J. C. Tretter ('13)
- New York City Labor Mediator Theodore W. Kheel (BA 1935, JD 1937) from 1956-1982 appointed by Mayor Robert F. Wagner, Jr.

Government

- U.S. Deputy Secretary of Labor Seth Harris ('83)
- New York State Senator Michael F. Nozzolio ('73)
- New York State Senator David Carlucci
- Chief Judge of the United States Court of Appeals for the District of Columbia Circuit Harry T. Edwards ('62)
- Chairman of the Council of Economic Advisers Alan B. Krueger ('82)

Other

- Rabbi Bruce M. Cohen ('82)
- Former Cornell football head coach Jim Knowles ('87)
- Publicist Matthew Hiltzik ('94)
- Sara Horowitz ('84), founder of the Freelancers Union
- CBS's The Early Show reporter Dave Price ('87)
- Martin F. Scheinman (BS '75, MS '76), leading American arbitrator and mediator
- Harold Tanner ('52), former chairman of the Cornell University Board of Trustees
