= Industrial and Labor Relations Review =

- Discipline: Business, economics, sociology
- Language: English
- Edited by: Michele Belot, Virginia Doellgast

Publication details
- History: 1947–present
- Publisher: SAGE Publications for the Cornell University School of Industrial and Labor Relations (United States)
- Frequency: 5/year
- Impact factor: 4.543 (2020)

Standard abbreviations
- Bluebook: Indus. & Lab. Rel. Rev.
- ISO 4: Ind. Labor Relat. Rev.

Indexing
- ISSN: 0019-7939 (print); 2162-271X (web)
- LCCN: 50003249
- JSTOR: 00197939
- OCLC no.: 896745619

Links
- Journal homepage; Journal homepage on SAGE Journals; Online access; Online archive

Industrial and Labor Relations Review (ILR Review) is a publication of the Cornell University School of Industrial and Labor Relations. It is an interdisciplinary journal publishing original research on all aspects of industrial relations. The editors are Michele Belot and Virginia Doellgast (Cornell University). The target audience is composed of academics and practitioners in labor and employment relations.

The review covers economics of the workplace, work-life issues, collective bargaining and contract administration, union governance and reform, dispute resolution, history of the labor movement, union organizing, law and other issues. It publishes approximately 25 book reviews each year. It was founded in 1947. Starting in 2014, SAGE Publications took over publication and increased the frequency from quarterly to five per year.

== See also ==
- Cornell HR Review
