= Neil W. Chamberlain =

American economist (1915–2006)

Chamberlain at Columbia University in 1972

Neil Cornelius Wolverton Chamberlain (May 18, 1915 – September 14, 2006) was an American economist who served as the Armand G. Erpf Professor of Modern Corporations of the Graduate School of Business at Columbia University. Previously, he was a professor in the Department of Economics at Yale University. His scholarly work focused on industrial relations and labor economics, the economies of corporations and corporate planning, national planning, and social values and corporate social responsibility. He authored nineteen books, edited six more, published numerous articles in academic journals, including co-authoring Collective Bargaining with James W. Kuhn, and wrote an intellectual memoir as well. His range of research and writing was unusually wide, but his most significant contribution to the field of economics was in the study of industrial relations and especially in his analysis of bargaining power. Chamberlain

== Early life, education, and writing ==
Chamberlain was born on May 18, 1915, in Charlotte, North Carolina, as the son of Henry Bryan Chamberlain and the former Elizabeth Wolverton. When he was two years old the family moved to Ohio and he grew up in Lakewood, Ohio. From the time of junior high school on, he was interested in creative writing, working on poems, short stories, and an incomplete novel. While at Lakewood High School, which he began as the Great Depression was starting, he took third prize in national Scholastic Art & Writing Awards with a short story called "Hunger". Another short story, "A Millionaire's Debut", was published in the Cleveland News.

During vacations when he was 17 and 18, Chamberlain traveled around the country by hitchhiking and freighthopping. A San Francisco newspaper recounted his 7,000-mile (11,000 km) wandering journey with another 18-year-old friend from Cleveland to there, in which they started with only $3.77, washing dishes for funds while staying in hobo jungles and sometimes encountering long waits for cars to pick them up. By the age of 19, he said he had traveled some 23,000 miles (37,000 km) and seen 41 states. He offered to give 15-minute talks, titled "The Category of Dreamers" and concerning the state of youth, in the Lakewood area.

He attended Adelbert College of Western Reserve University, having been granted a scholarship, and initially majored in history. He was elected Phi Beta Kappa as a senior. He was also a poet there, winning first prize as a junior and second prize as a senior in the Rupert Hughes Prizes in Poetry. In 1937, he graduated with an A.B. degree magna cum laude.

Chamberlain was initially primarily interested in writing as a career possibility. While a freshman he was also working as editor of the People's Penny Weekly, a magazine intended to provide local coverage of Lakewood. During his senior year in college he worked part-time at the Cleveland bureau of the International News Service. There he covered many significant developments in labor relations during the mid-1930s. These included the Fisher Body sit-down strike against General Motors.

By his account he then tried two other writing and editing jobs before, after a year's lapse, returning to his education to give himself an understanding of the forces at play in these labor disputes. At the Graduate School at Western Reserve University, he earned an M.A. degree in economics in 1939. At the same time he wrote a play about the Chrysler Auto Strike of 1939, From Now to Hallelujah, which he later said was accepted for production at a local theater group but never put on due to a scheduling conflict. He also later recalled functioning as executive secretary of a successful campaign to amend the Cleveland city charter to bring most civil service employees under the merit system.

Chamberlain then obtained a Ph.D. in economics from Ohio State University in 1942. The topic of his dissertation was "The Nature and Practice of Collective Bargaining". By now his practice of other forms of writing was being replaced by his interest in economic research. During the latter portion of this time he was a research fellow at the Brookings Institution.

Chamberlain married the former Mariam Kenosian in 1942.

During the World War II period, he was in the United States Naval Reserve from 1942 to 1946, where he began as an ensign and finished as a lieutenant. There he did work related to cryptography. Meanwhile, his wife worked as an analyst for the Office of Strategic Services during the war and then earned a Ph.D. in economics from Harvard University in 1950.

== Early career ==
Following his service, Chamberlain was given a Social Science Research Council demobilization fellowship and in 1946 found a position as research director at the Yale Labor and Management Center, which had shortly before been founded by E. Wight Bakke. By 1947 he was also an assistant professor of economics at Yale. His first major book, The Union Challenge to Management Control , was published in 1948. In 1949 he became assistant director of the Labor and Management Center. That same year, he became an associate professor.

Chamberlain's early work at Yale and the center and his books published during this time focused on exploring matters related to bargaining in the context of labor-management conflicts, the social impact of strikes, and the idea of managerial discretion and how unions challenged it. His insights into industrial relations theory as a whole became a substantial addition to scholarly knowledge.

His definition of bargaining power, which is based upon the notion of the "inducement to agree", became widely used. Examining the history of many labor-management actions and conflicts as case studies, he analyzed their tactics with his framework of how each sought to influence relative bargaining power. His analysis of bargaining power and its effects went beyond concepts introduced by others earlier and provided a springboard for the examination of behavioral aspects of the bargaining process as well as bargaining power as a dynamic entity. Influencing several generations of scholars, Chamberlain's work on bargaining power would become his most significant contribution to the field. His 1951 textbook Collective Bargaining presented some of these ideas and was twice later republished in revised editions.

His work on strikes, which was published in two books, Social Responsibility and Strikes (1953) and The Impact of Strikes: Their Social and Economic Costs (1954), was done in collaboration with Jane Metzger Schilling, an assistant in research at the center and a doctoral student in the Department of Economics at Yale who was working on research into invention and innovation and into the scope of bargaining units. Their work devised a quantitative framework for analyzing the effect of strikes on the various parties involved as well as on the general public, making use of reliable figures when available and forming imprecise judgments when not, then sought to evaluate seventeen recent strikes in the coal, rail, and steel industries in these terms. They also made public policy recommendations regarding when government intervention should be undertaken, saying that such action must take into effect the loss of income for producers as well as the loss of goods and services for consumers. The second of these books became one of Chamberlain's works to be translated into other languages, in this case Japanese.

While Chamberlain self-identified as an industrial relations specialist, he nonetheless next wrote A General Theory of Economic Process, an attempt to define the overall economic environment in ways that provided entrée for the insights of his labor analyses. It was the most ambitious effort he ever undertook. In its preface he wrote, "Such an effort may appear pretentious when made by one who lays no claim to being a general theoretician ... I feel (almost apologetically) a need to explain the existence of this work." In it he used bargaining as the central element for economic analysis.

== Middle career ==
Chamberlain moved to Columbia University, where he was a professor of economics in its Graduate School of Business from 1954 to 1959. There he replaced the retiring Paul Frederick Brissenden as head of the school's program in Labor and Industrial Relations. This was part of a wave of hirings as the business school sought to improve its intellectual standing by strengthening its research program and instituting a Ph.D. program separate from that of the Department of Economics.

During this time, Chamberlain was recruited by Thomas H. Carroll of the Ford Foundation, who was starting an effort for the improvement of business school education. Chamberlain thus became director of the Program in Economic Development and Administration at the foundation from 1957 to 1960, where he also focused a research program on business decision making. Chamberlain subsequently returned to Yale as a professor of economics for the period 1959–1967.

In the 1960s, Chamberlain's research began to focus on theory of the firm and industrial organization, as exemplified by his 1962 book The Firm: Micro-Economic Planning and Action. In particular he examined corporate planning and public planning. These works adopted some of the approaches of institutional economics and were less quantitative and more philosophical than some of the author's previous efforts. He then branched out even further afield, writing about nuclear disarmament in 1963 and population economics in 1970. In the first, he argued that "if what everyone says [they want] (peace and disarmament) is eventually achieved, the consequences are almost certain to be the end of 500 years of Western world supremacy."

Chamberlain was prominent in the Industrial Relations Research Association, serving on its executive board during 1955–58 and its president in 1967. Chamberlain served on the board of editors of The American Economic Review from 1957 to 1959, the board of directors of the Salzburg Seminar in American Studies for 1957–78, the editorial council of Management International during 1960–70, and two stints on the board of trustees of the Columbia Journal of World Business (1969–72, 1975–80).

He and his wife Mariam Chamberlain divorced in 1967. She joined the Ford Foundation and became the director of its higher education program; the grants she dispensed during the 1970s would become instrumental in establishing the place of women's studies at colleges in the United States.

Meanwhile, he married Harriet Feigenbaum in 1968. She is a sculptor most known for a 1990 installation in New York City, Memorial to Victims of the Injustice of the Holocaust.

Chamberlain returned to Columbia's Graduate School of Business again to stay for good in 1967, heading a new program in Corporate Relations and Public Policy. He was named the Armand G. Erpf Professor of Modern Corporations in 1969. In the wake of the Columbia University protests of 1968, Chamberlain was on the side of those who prized the restoration of order in American and European academies, signing on to a 1969 statement by hundreds of faculty members proclaiming that, "Academic freedom and the sanctuary of the university campus extend to all who share these aims and responsibilities. They cannot be invoked by those who would subordinate intellectual freedom to political ends, or who violate the norms of conduct established to protect that freedom. Against such offenders the university has the right, and indeed the obligation, to defend itself."

== Later career ==
During the latter part of his career, Chamberlain took on the analysis of the role of corporation management in society. In a series of books from 1973 on he became known as an economist who found insights in the relationship of business power to social power. He also became involved in community-related projects such as a 1972 plan to help decentralize city services in nearby Washington Heights, Manhattan.

Tackling the issue of corporate responsibility, his 1973 book The Limits of Corporate Responsibility Chamberlain said that businesses could do "remarkably little" about urban problems, environmental degradation, product safety, or worker dissatisfaction, because the values of the business culture are incompatible with such goals and economic forces will constrain businesses to only actions which result in growth and profit. Writing for The New York Times Book Review, Stephen B. Shepard said that Chamberlain made a strong case for business not being able to solve urban woes, but that elsewhere he overstated his thesis and underestimated the chances that businesses could be part of environmental improvement solutions.

Chamberlain retired in 1980, after which he became the Armand G. Erpf Professor Emeritus at Columbia. His last academic book, Social Strategy and Corporate Structure, was published in 1982.

Over the course of his career, Chamberlain became more pessimistic in his conclusions, believing that notions about union-management collaboration would have scant impact on the corporation's ability to react to external events. He also grew dissatisfied with the development of economic analysis, believing it too formal and beholden to quantitative methods and lacking a value-based look at how corporate management behaved. Indeed, Chamberlain became skeptical about his discipline as a whole. In the context of a 1980 New York Times piece about the hazards of poorly conducted social science research, he was quoted as saying, "We know very little about what we profess to know. We have claimed too much as a profession." He came to have philosophical doubts about the entire study of economics, believing that purposeful action, unforeseen trends, and random occurrences combine to give economic theories that are based upon the observation of what has taken place in the past little predictive ability or policy-making usefulness in terms of what will take place in the future.

Chamberlain thus abandoned economic work altogether after 1982, deciding that he wanted to return to writing fiction. He worked on at least two novels during this period, although nothing was published, and he painted as well. He published a memoir of sorts, Intellectual Odyssey: An Economist's Ideological Journey, in 1996. It traced the development of his interests and summarized the work and conclusions of many of his books. The last chapter of the memoir includes lengthy excerpts from one of the novels, whose protagonist is a disillusioned economics professor considering whether to retire and struggling with philosophical questions.

Chamberlain died at age 91 on September 14, 2006.

== Legacy ==
Writing in the Journal of Economic Issues in 1996, Charles J. Whalen said that "Chamberlain's career in economics has been extraordinary."

In a 1983 retrospective of Chamberlain's career written shortly after his retirement and published in the British Journal of Industrial Relations, three business professors at Columbia University – James W. Kuhn, David Lewin, and Paul J. McNulty – analyzed where his work had had the greatest scholarly influence and where it had been less so. Their conclusion was that despite a fair amount of the latter, "Chamberlain stands ... as an intellectual giant and a major intellectual force, whose legacy will endure." Chamberlain's definition of bargaining power is still taught and used, such as in its presentation in the 2012 textbook Fundamentals of Labor Economics by Thomas Hyclak, Geraint Johnes, and Robert Thornton and in the 2004 fifth edition of the popular International City/County Management Association "Green Book" Management Policies in Local Government Finance.

In terms of the labor history discipline, Chamberlain came to be seen as part of the mainstream, along with scholars such as Sumner Slichter and Richard Lester, who focused on institutions and laws, as opposed to "new labor history" and its adherents, such as David Brody and Nelson Lichtenstein, who focused more on demographics and social history. Like two other scholarly pioneers in industrial relations and labor research, Robert F. Hoxie and John R. Commons, Chamberlain was dissatisfied with neoclassical economics-based theory and sought to provide new and different explanations for the economic process. This foray into general theory, like those of the other two, generally found few followers in the field.

Chamberlain was given a lifetime achievement award by the Industrial Relations Research Association for 2002, handed out during its 2003 meeting. He was one of the first members of that association to be so honored.

Following his death, Dean of the Columbia Business School Glenn Hubbard said Chamberlain that "produced work of great importance to the greater business community, always with an active and curious mind." David B. Lipsky, former Dean of the Cornell University School of Industrial and Labor Relations, characterized Chamberlain as "one of the greatest of all industrial relations scholars" and said that, "For scholars of my generation, Neil was a giant – through the rigor and originality of his research he inspired us to believe that a career devoted to industrial relations research could be a noble undertaking."

== Published works ==
- Collective Bargaining Procedures (American Council on Public Affairs, 1944)
- The Union Challenge to Management Control (Harper & Brothers, 1948)
- Cases on Labor Relations (The Foundation Press, 1949) [co-editor with Harry Shulman]
- Management in Motion: The Corporate Decision-Making Process as Applied to the Transfer of Employees (Labor and Management Center, Yale University, 1950) [report]
- Collective Bargaining (McGraw-Hill, 1951; second edition, 1965 [with James W. Kuhn]; third edition, 1986 [with James W. Kuhn])
- Social Responsibility and Strikes (Harper & Brothers, 1953) [assisted by Jane Metzger Schilling]
- The Impact of Strikes: Their Economic and Social Costs (Harper & Brothers, 1954) [co-author with Jane Metzger Schilling] (republished by Greenwood Press, 1973)
- A General Theory of Economic Process (Harper & Brothers, 1955)
- A Decade of Industrial Relations Research 1946-1956 (Harper & Brothers, 1958) [co-editor with Frank C. Pierson and Theresa Wolfson]
- Labor (McGraw-Hill, 1958)
- Sourcebook on Labor (McGraw-Hill, 1958 [editor]; 1964 [editor, revised and abridged with assistance of Richard Perlman])
- The Firm: Micro-Economic Planning and Action (McGraw-Hill, 1962)
- The West in a World Without War (McGraw-Hill, 1963)
- Private and Public Planning (McGraw-Hill, 1965)
- The Labor Sector (McGraw-Hill, 1965; second edition, 1971 [with Donald E. Cullen]; third edition, 1980 [with Donald E. Cullen and David Lewin])
- Enterprise and Environment: The Firm in Time and Place (McGraw-Hill, 1968)
- Frontiers of Collective Bargaining (Harper and Row, 1968) [co-editor with John T. Dunlop]
- Contemporary Economic Issues (R. D. Irwin, 1969; revised edition, 1973) [editor]
- Beyond Malthus: Population and Power (Basic Books, 1970)
- Business and the Cities (Basic Books, 1970) [editor]
- The Place of Business in America's Future: A Study in Social Values (Basic Books, 1973)
- The Limits of Corporate Responsibility (Basic Books, 1973)
- Remaking American Values: Challenge to a Business Society (Basic Books, 1977)
- Forces of Change in Western Europe (McGraw-Hill, 1980)
- Social Strategy and Corporate Structure (Macmillan, 1982) (republished by Free Press, 2007)
- Intellectual Odyssey: An Economist's Ideological Journey (Pentland Press, 1996)
