= Geraint Jones (disambiguation) =

Geraint Jones (born 1976) is a former England and Papua New Guinea cricketer.

Geraint Jones may also refer to

- Geraint Jones (educator), British educator
- Geraint Dyfed Barri Jones (1936–1999), English classical scholar and archaeologist
- Geraint Rhys Jones (born 1987), Welsh rugby union player
- Geraint Stanley Jones (c.1936–2015), Welsh television executive

== See also ==
- Geraint Johnes, Welsh economist
