= Appellate Division Courthouse of New York State =

Courthouse in Manhattan, New York

- Appellate Division Courthouse of New York State, First Department
- U.S. National Register of Historic Places
- New York State Register of Historic Places
- New York City Landmark
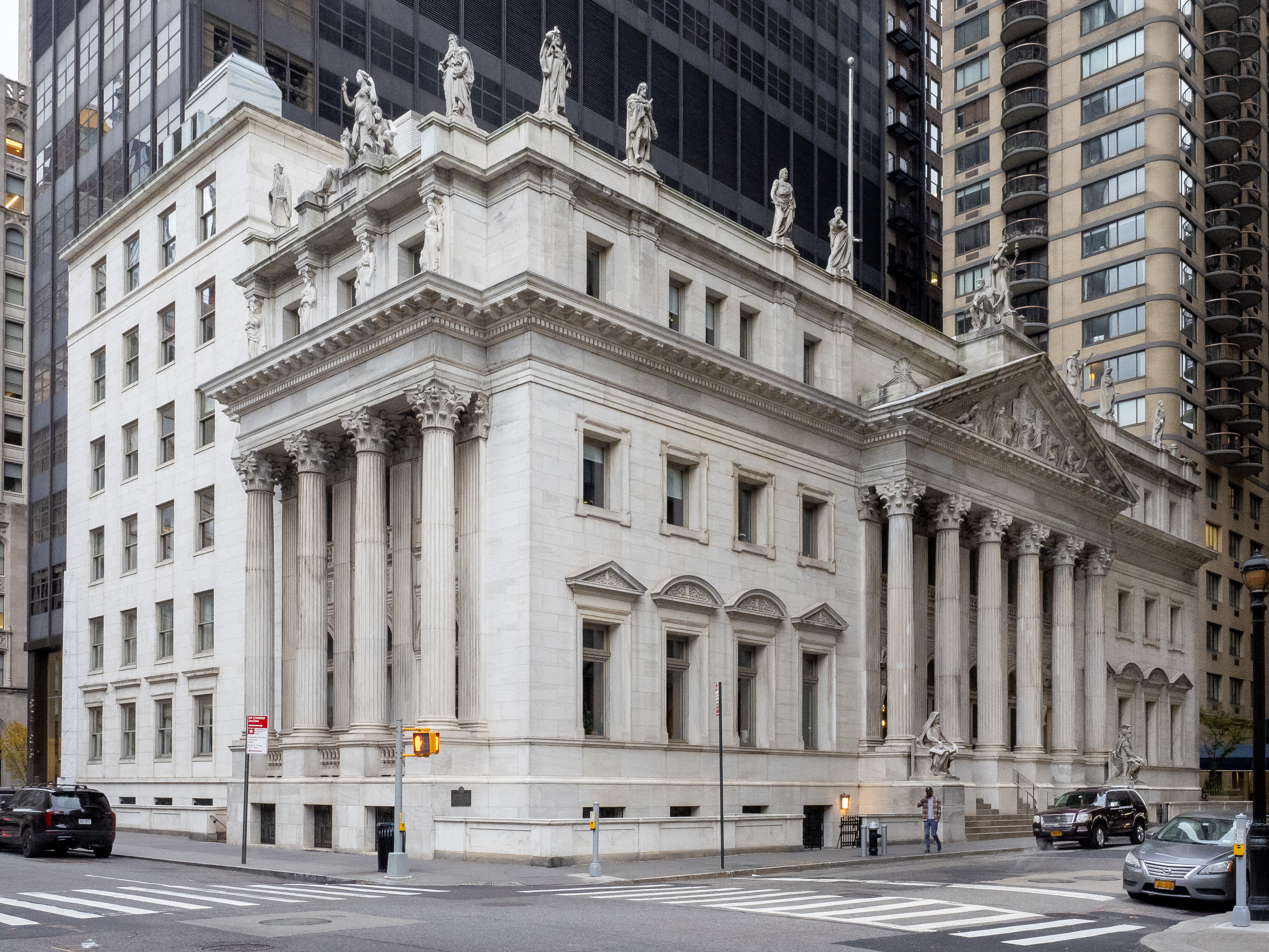
- Location: 35 East 25th Street; Manhattan, New York, U.S.
- Coordinates: 40°44′32″N 73°59′12″W
- Built: 1896–1899
- Architect: James Brown Lord; Rogers & Butler (1952 annex)
- Architectural style: Late 19th and 20th century revivals, Renaissance Revival
- NRHP reference No.: 82003366
- NYSRHP No.: 06101.001808
- NYCL No.: 0235, 1098

Significant dates
- Added to NRHP: July 26, 1982
- Designated NYSRHP: June 11, 1982
- Designated NYCL: June 7, 1966 (exterior); September 22, 1981 (interior)

The Appellate Division Courthouse of New York State is a courthouse in the Flatiron District of Manhattan in New York City, New York, U.S. The courthouse is used by the First Department of the New York Supreme Court's Appellate Division. The original three-story building, at the northeast corner of Madison Avenue and 25th Street, was designed by James Brown Lord in the Renaissance Revival style and was finished in 1899. A six-story annex to the north, on Madison Avenue, was designed by Rogers & Butler and completed in 1955.

The facade of both the original building and its annex is made almost entirely out of marble. The courthouse's exterior was originally decorated with 21 sculptures from 16 separate artists; one of the sculptures was removed in 1955. The main entrance is through a double-height colonnade on 25th Street with a decorative pediment; there is also a smaller colonnade on Madison Avenue. The far northern end of the annex's facade contains a Holocaust Memorial by Harriet Feigenbaum, and the sculpture NOW by Shahzia Sikander is mounted atop the building. Inside the courthouse, ten artists created murals for the main hall and the courtroom. The interiors are decorated with elements such as marble walls, woodwork, and paneled and coffered ceilings; the courtroom also has stained-glass windows and a stained-glass ceiling dome. The remainder of the building contains various offices, judges' chambers, and other rooms.

The Appellate Division Courthouse was proposed in the late 1890s to accommodate the Appellate Division's First Department, which had been housed in rented quarters since its founding in 1894. Construction took place between 1896 and 1899, with a formal opening on January 2, 1900. Following unsuccessful attempts to relocate the court in the 1930s and 1940s, the northern annex was built between 1952 and 1955, and the original courthouse was also renovated. The structure was again renovated in the 1980s and in the 2000s. Throughout the courthouse's existence, its architecture has received largely positive commentary. The Appellate Division Courthouse is listed on the National Register of Historic Places, and its facade and interior are both New York City designated landmarks.

== Site ==
The Appellate Division Courthouse occupies the northeast corner of Madison Avenue and 25th Street in the Flatiron District of Manhattan in New York City, New York. The rectangular land lot covers approximately 14,812 square feet (1,400 m^{2}; 0.34 acres), with a frontage, or width, of 98.5 feet (30.0 m) on Madison Avenue to the west and 150 feet (46 m) on 25th Street to the south. The original structure measured 150 feet (46 m) wide along 25th Street, with a depth of 50 feet (15 m) on its western end (facing Madison Avenue) and 100 feet (30 m) on its eastern end.

Madison Square Park is across Madison Avenue, while the New York Merchandise Mart occupies the site directly to the north. Other nearby buildings include the New York Life Building one block north, the Metropolitan Life North Building across 25th Street to the south, and the Metropolitan Life Insurance Company Tower one block south.

== Architecture ==
The original three-story Beaux-Arts courthouse, at the corner of Madison Avenue and 25th Street, was built between 1896 and 1899. It was designed by James Brown Lord in an Italian Renaissance Revival style with Palladian-inspired details, which include tall columns, a high base, and flat walls. The structure has been likened to an 18th-century English country house because of its Palladian details, and it was similar in scale to low-rise residential buildings at the time of its construction. A six-story annex next to the original building on Madison Avenue was designed by Rogers & Butler in 1952, with a marble facade and plain windows.

Sixteen sculptors, led by Daniel Chester French, worked on the courthouse's exterior; all of the sculptors were members of the then-new National Sculpture Society. Lord, with the assistance of the National Society of Mural Painters, commissioned ten artists to execute allegorical murals for the courthouse's interior. According to the New York City Department of Citywide Administrative Services, at the time of the building's construction, it featured decorations by more sculptors than any other edifice in the United States.

=== Facade ===
The facade is made almost entirely of marble. The original marble was quarried from North Adams, Massachusetts, except for small portions quarried from Proctor, Vermont; the Massachusetts marble has since been replaced with Alabama marble. A low marble parapet is placed in front of the building at street level. It contains white marble sculptures depicting subjects related to law; there were originally 21 sculptures, but the Muhammad sculpture was removed in 1955. The sculptures were treated as a key part of the design, rather than "mere adornment", and they accounted for one-fourth of the total construction cost. While many contemporary buildings in New York City contained niches for statues that were never installed, the statues on the Appellate Division Courthouse were a focal point of the building upon its completion.

All of the sculptures were of fictional or dead figures. Although members of the then-prominent Tammany Hall political ring had advocated for the inclusion of sculptures of living people, the artists were against the idea of statues that looked similar from a distance. As designed, the building's statues measure 12 feet (3.7 m) tall on average; at the time, such large statues were usually installed on much larger buildings. Many of the statues are installed in pairs and are placed directly above the facade's columns and vertical piers. The freestanding figures were carved out of Lasser marble and cost $20,000 each. (Note: About $635,000 in 2024)

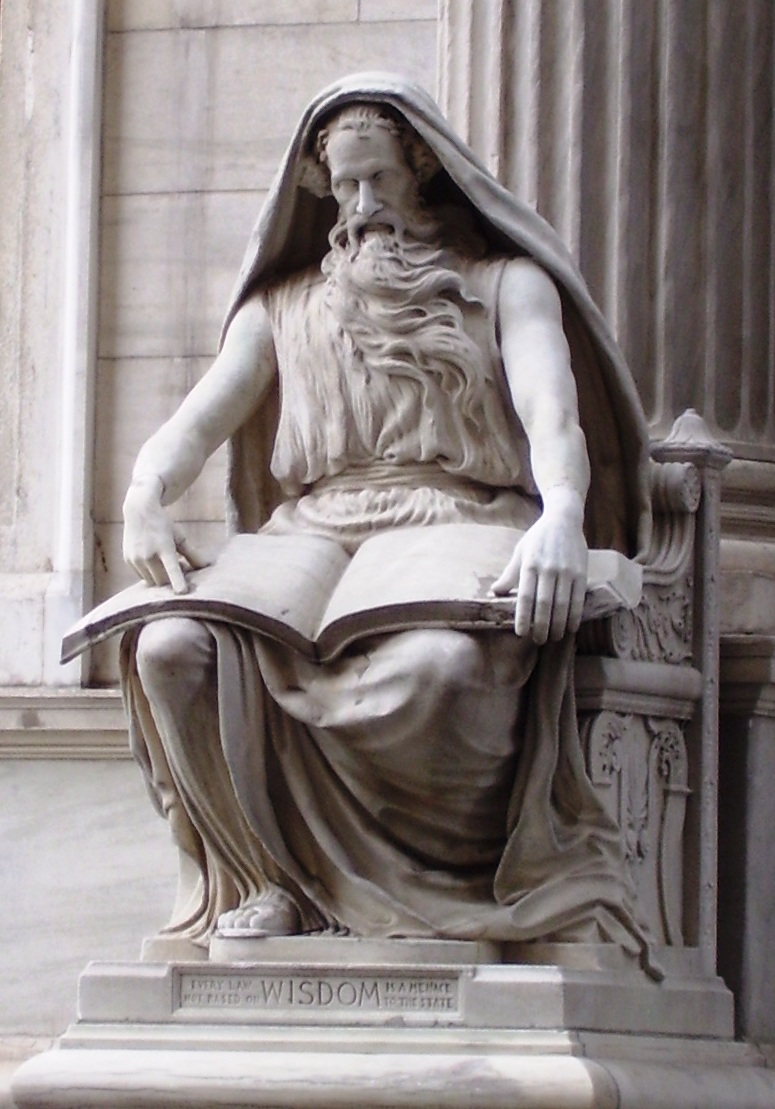
Frederick Ruckstull's Wisdom

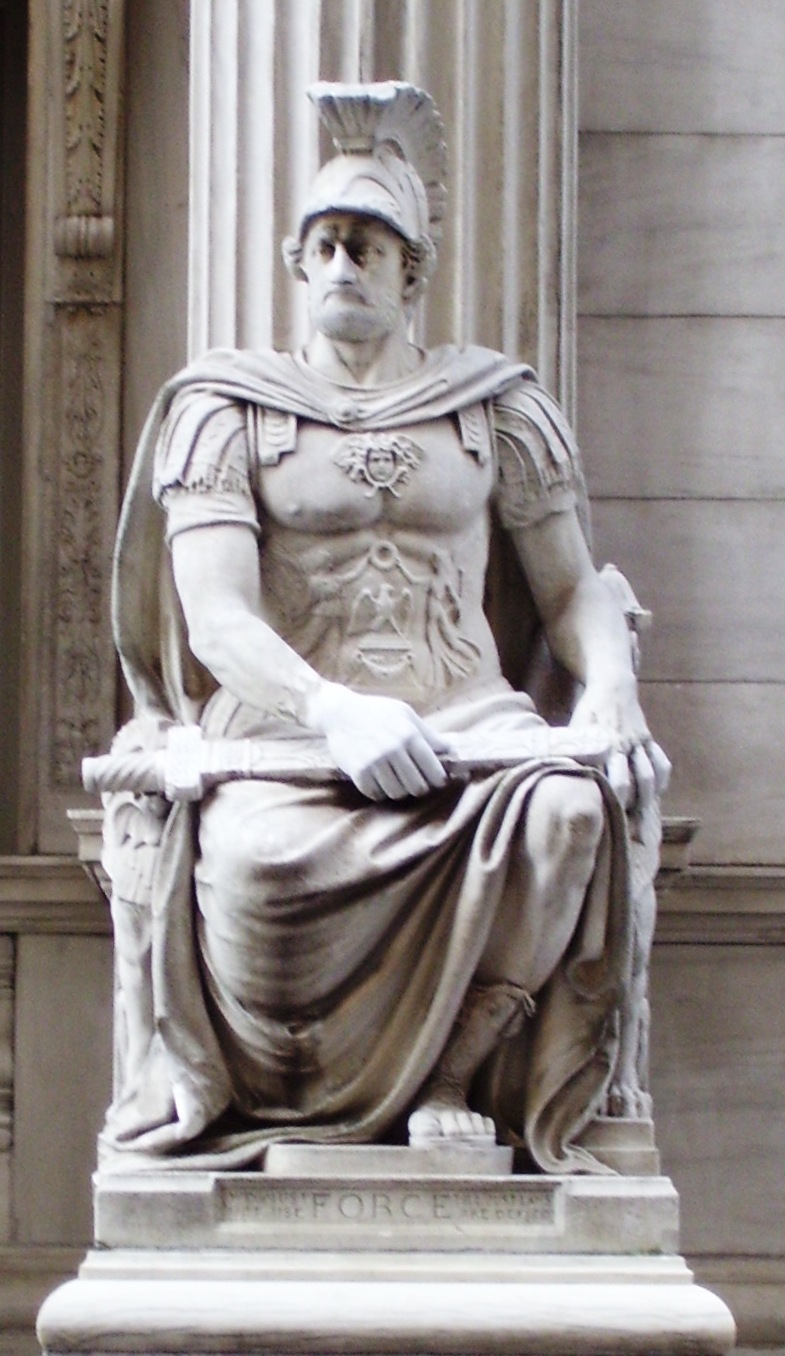
Ruckstull's Force

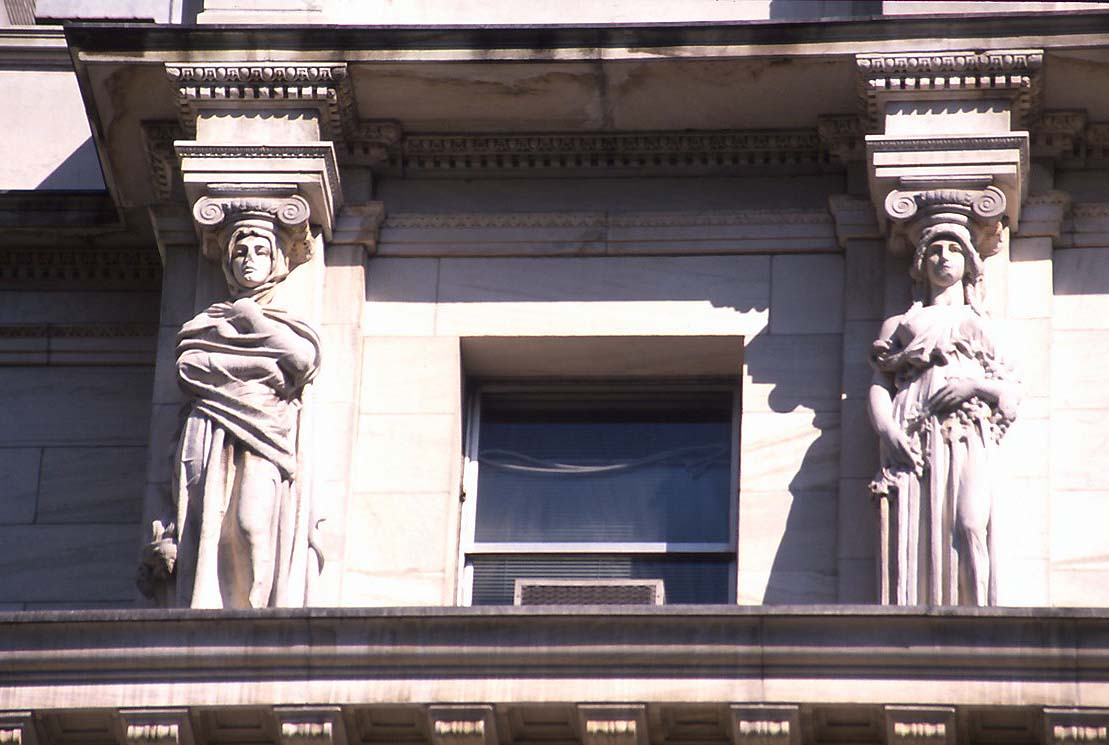
Thomas Shields Clarke's Caryatides of the Seasons

==== 25th Street ====
The primary elevation of the facade is along 25th Street to the south. At the center of the 25th Street elevation is a portico; this consists of a colonnade of six double-height columns, which support an entablature and a triangular pediment with sculptures. Each of the columns rises above a pedestal and is fluted; the capitals, or tops of the columns, are designed in the Corinthian order. The columns measure 24 feet (7.3 m) tall. At street level, "two pedestals holding two monumental seated figures" of Wisdom and Force, by Frederick Ruckstull, flank a set of stairs leading to the portico. Both statues are variously cited as measuring 6 feet 10 inches (2.08 m) tall or 7 feet 6 inches (2.29 m) tall. They each depict a heroically sized male figure; the Force sculpture is of a man wearing armor, while the Wisdom sculpture holds an open book.

Recessed behind the columns of the portico are five bays of doorways; the outer two bays are topped by triangular pediments with sculptures, while the center three bays are topped by arched pediments. Maximilian N. Schwartzott designed four sculptures for the triangular pediments, which were intended to represent the four periods of the day: The triangular pediment to the left (west) is ornamented with representations of morning and night, while those to the right (east) are ornamented with representations of noon and evening. The spandrels above these openings are 5 feet (1.5 m) long. There are windows with balustrades on the second story, above the doorways.

On either side of the central portico are four bays of windows with molded frames. Within these bays, the first-story windows have triangular or arched pediments, while the second-story windows are almost square. On the entirety of the 25th Street elevation, the second floor is topped by an entablature and a cornice with modillions and dentils. The third floor is set back slightly and includes rectangular windows, a simple entablature, and a rooftop parapet with sculptures. On the pediment is Charles Henry Niehaus's Triumph of Law, a group of five figures. The grouping is variously cited as measuring 43 feet (13 m) wide and 9 feet (2.7 m) high, or 32 feet (9.8 m) wide and 14 feet (4.3 m) high. This sculptural group contains icons such as tablets of the law, a crescent moon, a ram, and an owl; the center of the grouping depicts a seated woman flanked by two nude male figures.

==== Madison Avenue ====
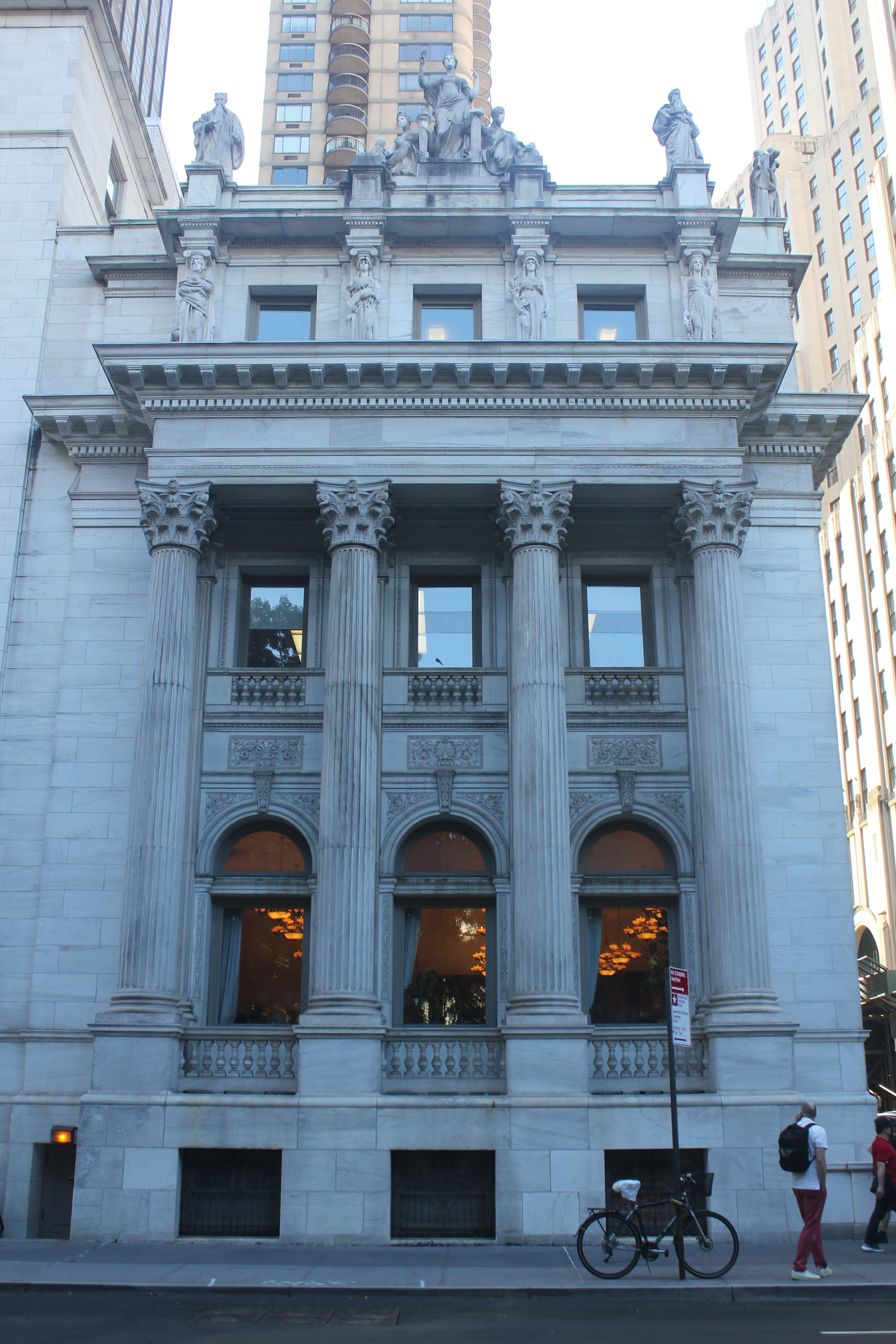
Secondary facade on Madison Avenue

The Madison Avenue elevation to the west is narrower than that on 25th Street. The original facade there contains a colonnade of four fluted columns with Corinthian capitals, which may have been intended to make that facade look larger. There is a balustrade running between the bottoms of each column. Behind the colonnade, there are arched windows on the first floor and rectangular windows with balustrades on the second floor, similar to the windows in the entrance portico. As on the 25th Street elevation, the second floor is topped by an entablature and a cornice.

The third floor is also set back slightly and is similar in design to that on 25th Street. The third-floor windows on Madison Avenue are flanked by four caryatids, or female figures, representing the seasons, which were sculpted by Thomas Shields Clarke. From left to right are Winter, next to a censer with a flame; Autumn, holding grapes in her hands; Summer, holding a sheaf of wheat and a sickle; and Spring, which is nude above her waist and holds a garland.

The six-story annex north of the original building is made of Alabama marble and was intended to be architecturally similar to the original courthouse. There are plain rectangular windows on each story of the annex except the first story, where the windows are topped with lintels and cornices. In addition, there are a horizontal belt course and a cornice above the annex's sixth floor.

==== Roof ====
As designed in 1896, the original courthouse's roof is 56 feet (17 m) above ground level. On the roof, there are nine freestanding sculptures of figures depicting historical, religious, and legendary lawgivers. These statues are of the same height and proportion, are robed, and appear with various attributes associated with the law, such as a book, scroll, tablet, sword, charter, or scepter. Originally, there were ten freestanding sculptures (eight facing 25th Street and two facing Madison Avenue). On Madison Avenue, the northern figure is Philip Martiny's sculpture of the Chinese philosopher Confucius, while the southern figure is William Couper's sculpture of the Hebrew prophet and lawman Moses. Between Confucius and Moses is Karl Bitter's sculptural group Peace, which consists of a central figure with uplifted arms, flanked by a female and a male.

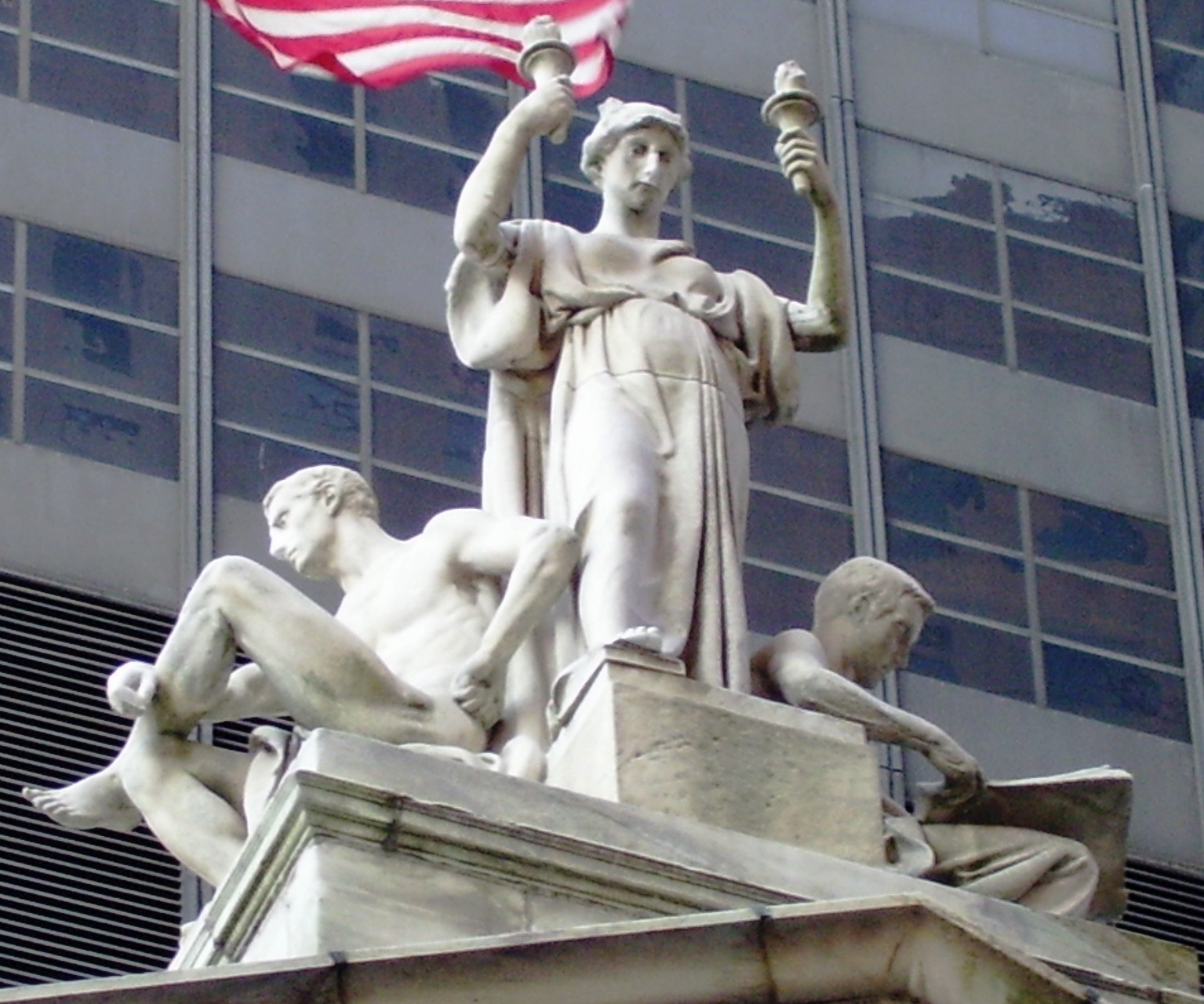
Daniel Chester French's Justice, flanked by Power and Study

Charles Albert Lopez's Mohammed originally stood on the western end of the 25th Street elevation but was removed in 1955 following protests against the image of the prophet from Muslim nations. The next sculptures to the east are Edward Clark Potter's Zoroaster, depicting the founder of Zoroastrianism; Jonathan Scott Hartley's Alfred the Great, depicting an Anglo-Saxon king; George Edwin Bissell's Lycurgus, depicting a Spartan legislator; and Herbert Adams's Solon, depicting an Athenian legislator. There are three more statues to the east: John Talbott Donoghue's Saint Louis, symbolizing the 13th-century French king; Henry Augustus Lukeman's Manu, symbolizing the author of Manusmriti; and Henry Kirke Bush-Brown's Justinian, symbolizing the 6th-century Byzantine emperor. The remaining sculptures on 25th Street were each relocated to the next pedestal to the west after Mohammed was removed, and the easternmost pedestal, which originally supported Justinian, was left vacant. The center of the facade contains a sculptural group with three sculptures by Daniel Chester French. A 12-foot-high (3.7 m) female sculpture of Justice is at the center, flanked by male sculptures of Power and Study. (Note: Alternatively referred to as Power and Knowledge)

==== Other sculptures ====
The far northern end of the annex's Madison Avenue facade contains a Holocaust memorial by Harriet Feigenbaum. The memorial was conceived in 1986 by Francis T. Murphy, chief justice of the First Department, who believed that "a symbol of injustice is just as important" to the court as the "symbols of justice" on the original courthouse. The sculpture consists of a map of the Auschwitz concentration camp at its base, as well as a 38-foot-tall (12 m) marble column intended to resemble the smokestack of a Nazi concentration camp.

A golden sculpture of a female lawgiver, known as NOW, has been mounted atop the easternmost pedestal on 25th Street since 2023. Created by Pakistani-American artist Shahzia Sikander, the sculpture was intended to draw attention to gender inequality and gender biases.

=== Interior ===
The first story was built with an 18-foot-high (5.5 m) ceiling, the second story has a 14-foot (4.3 m) ceiling, and the third story has an 11-foot (3.4 m) ceiling. In addition, there are a 10-foot-tall (3.0 m) basement and a sub-cellar. Siena marble, onyx, stained glass, and murals are used throughout the courthouse.

The interior has artwork from ten muralists. Henry Siddons Mowbray, Robert Reid, Willard Leroy Metcalf, and Charles Yardley Turner were selected for the murals in the entrance hall, while Edwin Howland Blashfield, Henry Oliver Walker, Edward Simmons, Kenyon Cox, and Joseph Lauber were hired to paint murals in the courtroom. Alfred Collins had also been hired to design a courtroom mural but was replaced by George W. Maynard at the last minute. In addition, John La Farge was hired to review the quality and consistency of the paintings and to adjudicate any artistic disputes that arose. The Baltimore Sun wrote that the courthouse was "the only public building in the United States that from the beginning was designed with a view to complete harmony of detail—architectural, mural decoration and sculptural effect". Blashfield later said that he feared the artwork had been overdone because of the massive efforts that went into decorating the building. The Herter Brothers made wood-and-leather chairs and couches for the courthouse, some of which have dolphin-shaped armrests.

==== Main hall ====
There are three paneled-wood doors leading from the portico on 25th Street to the courthouse's main hall; these doors are topped by tympana, which are also paneled. The main hall measures 50 by 38 feet (15 by 12 m) across and functions as a lobby and waiting area, with seats designed by the Herter Brothers. The floors were originally made of mosaic tile. On the Siena-marble walls are fluted Corinthian piers also made of marble, with lighting sconces attached onto the piers. The north wall of the main hall contains a pair of staircases with openwork railings made of bronze; the stairs lead to the second and third floors. There is also an elevator on the north wall. The hall's ceiling is paneled and coffered, with a bronze-and-glass chandelier and foliate motifs. The gold-on-red color of the ceiling was intended to harmonize with the marble used on the walls. During the 20th century, the lobby had busts of lawyers Charles O'Conor and Bernard Botein, but O'Conor's bust was removed in 1982.

Above the marble walls are friezes with murals, which wrap around the room. The north wall contains Mowbray's mural Transmission of the Law, which consists of eight winged figures representing different eras of the history of law, all connected by a scroll. Mowbray's figures, painted in green, yellow, and blue, are superimposed on a blue background. Reid's artwork of justice occupies the east wall, as well as the eastern part of the south wall, and depicts various topics, tenets, and types of art. Turner designed two figures, signifying equity and law, above the main entrances on the south wall. Metcalf's justice artwork occupies the west wall, as well as the western part of the south wall, and depicts personifications of tenets related to justice. Reid's and Metcalf's murals are designed in a more modern style and did not rely as much on classical motifs, although the colors used in all three murals harmonized with each other.

==== Courtroom ====
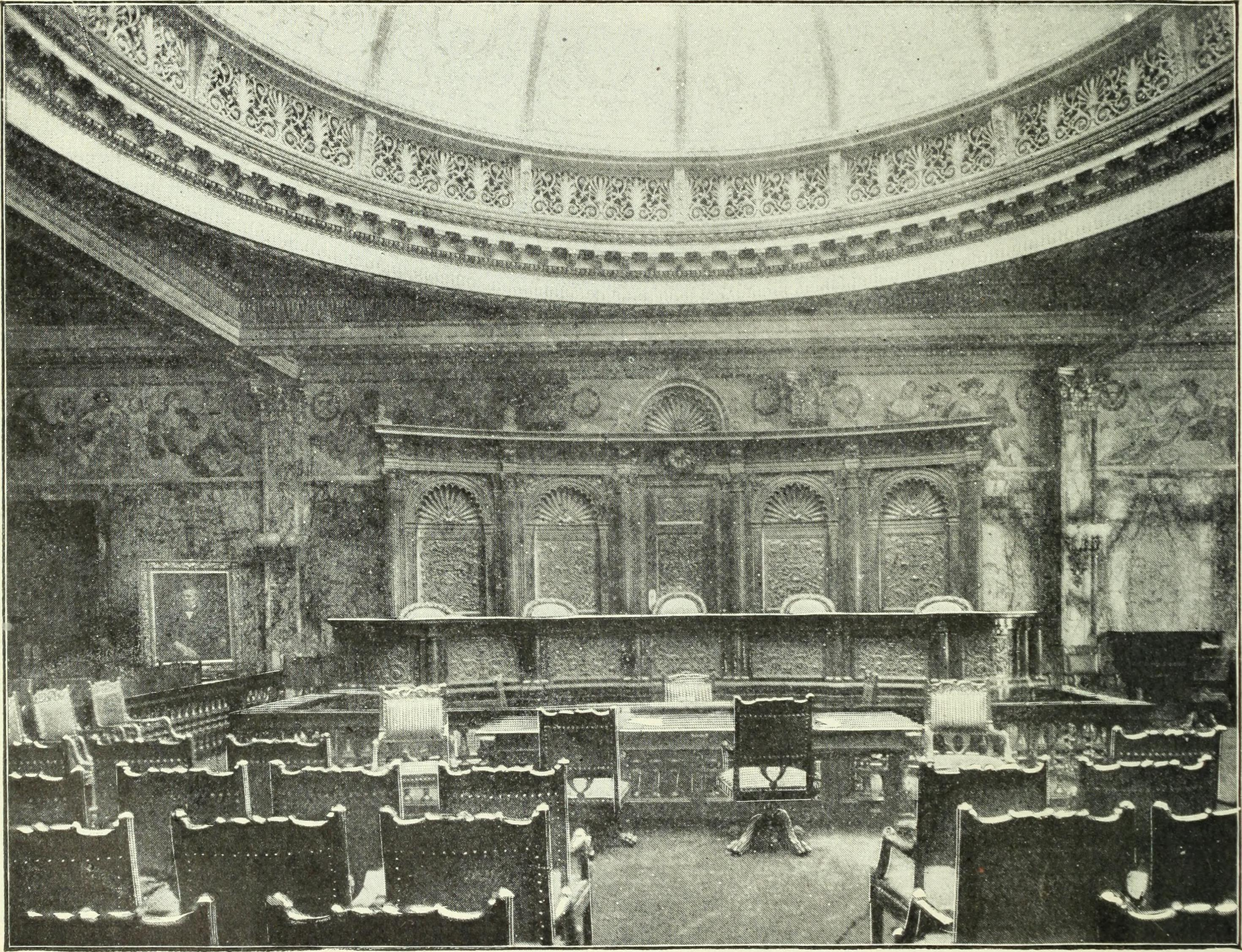
The courtroom in the 1890s

As designed, the courtroom was placed on the eastern half of the first floor, extending northward to the rear of the building. This may have been motivated by a desire to place the courtroom so it faced away from Madison Square Park. The original design called for the appellate courtroom to measure 46 by 68 feet (14 by 21 m) across. The space is decorated with woodwork made by the George C. Flint Company, as well as furniture made by the Herter Brothers. The western wall of the courtroom contains the judges' bench, which is placed on a dais; the bench is curved outward and is elaborately decorated. The front portion of the judges' bench contains colonettes and panels. Behind each of the bench's five seats are ornamental panels with scallop-shaped tympana; each panel is separated by engaged columns, and there is an entablature above the columns.

There is a wooden balustrade separating the spectators' seats on either side from the court officials' area in the middle. The walls of the courtroom have Siena marble wainscoting interspersed with pilasters of the same material, which in turn are topped by Corinthian capitals. The wainscoting measures 10 feet 9 inches (3.28 m) tall. D. Maitland Armstrong designed several stained-glass windows on the north and south walls; there are marble seating areas beneath each set of stained-glass windows. Above the stained-glass windows on the south wall is a Latin inscription that translates to "Civil law should be neither influenced by good nature, nor broken down by power, nor debased by money."

At the top of each wall, a frieze runs across the entire room, except on a portion of the eastern wall (directly opposite the bench); this frieze measures 4 feet 3 inches (1.30 m) tall. On the eastern wall is a triptych with three panels separated by marble pilasters. From right to left, these panels are Power of the Law by Edwin H. Blashfield; Wisdom of the Law by Henry O. Walker; and Justice of the Law by Edward Simmons. These panels contain personifications of numerous concepts related to law. George Maynard carved a pair of seals of the city and state governments of New York, with one seal mounted on either side of the triptych. Both of the seals are supported by figures. The north and south walls are decorated with Judicial Virtues by Joseph Lauber, which consists of eight mural panels depicting virtues on either wall; the leftmost and rightmost panels on either wall depict "four cardinal virtues". Lauber's panels are interspersed with Armstrong's stained-glass windows on these walls. On the west wall above the bench, Kenyon Cox designed The Reign of Law, a five-part frieze with figures that signify numerous tenets related to the reign of law, mostly in a yellow color scheme.

The gilded ceiling is divided into multiple panels and coffers, similar to in the main hall. As in the main hall, the gold-on-red color of the ceiling was intended to harmonize with the marble used on the walls. The space is illuminated by a 30-foot-wide (9.1 m) ceiling dome and three large windows, which in turn were designed by Armstrong. This courtroom's ceiling was protected by a second dome, which extended to a glass dome in the roof. The circumference of the dome contains wrought iron letters spelling out the names of "past leaders of the American bar" at the time of the building's completion in 1899. The names of all Appellate Division justices until 1955, and the names of presiding justices after that year, are displayed at the base of the dome.

==== Other spaces ====
The lawyers' anteroom is located at the southeastern corner of the building, on 25th Street; most of the room's original decorations are still extant. It is accessed by paneled wooden doors at the southern end of the main hall's east wall. The lawyers' anteroom has elaborate woodwork doorways and window frames, and the plaster ceiling has a frieze and cornice. In addition, there are ornate, paneled coat stalls with decorations such as griffins and finials, and there are stained-glass windows on the north wall (shared with the main courtroom), behind the coat stalls. The anteroom has holes for holding canes and hooks for holding hats, which are illuminated by the stained-glass windows. There is also a lawyers' room next to the waiting room, with similar decorations to the lawyers' anteroom. Bronze-and-glass lights adorn both the lawyers' room and the anteroom.

Placed on the western half of the ground floor, near Madison Avenue, are the judges' chambers and other rooms, including clerks' and stenographers' offices. A private passage allows judges to access an elevator to the second floor without running into other occupants.

On the second story are the library, judges' quarters, stenographers' room, and bathrooms. Each of the judges' quarters has a large antechamber attached to it, and there was also a consultation room. The third floor has one additional judge's quarters due to a lack of space on the second story. There are also janitors' rooms and storage rooms on the third floor. The basement, accessed directly from the street, had attendants' rooms, as well as an engine room and a public bathroom. The cellar was used as storage space and a heating plant. To the north of the original courthouse is the six-story annex, which contains additional offices and is connected to the original courthouse by various hallways.

== History ==
The First Department of the New York Supreme Court's Appellate Division, the state's intermediate appellate court serving Manhattan and the Bronx, was established in 1894. It originally occupied rented quarters at 111 Fifth Avenue, at the intersection with 19th Street, and heard appeals of civil cases. The First Department was the only appellate department in the state with seven judges, while the Appellate Division's other three departments had five judges. Despite this, the First Department was overwhelmed with cases in the late 1890s: it heard over a thousand cases annually, forcing the department to transfer some cases to Brooklyn and consider adding two more justices. Although the department had seven judges, only five would hear cases at any given time; hence, the bench of the current courthouse includes five seats.

=== Development ===
==== Site selection ====
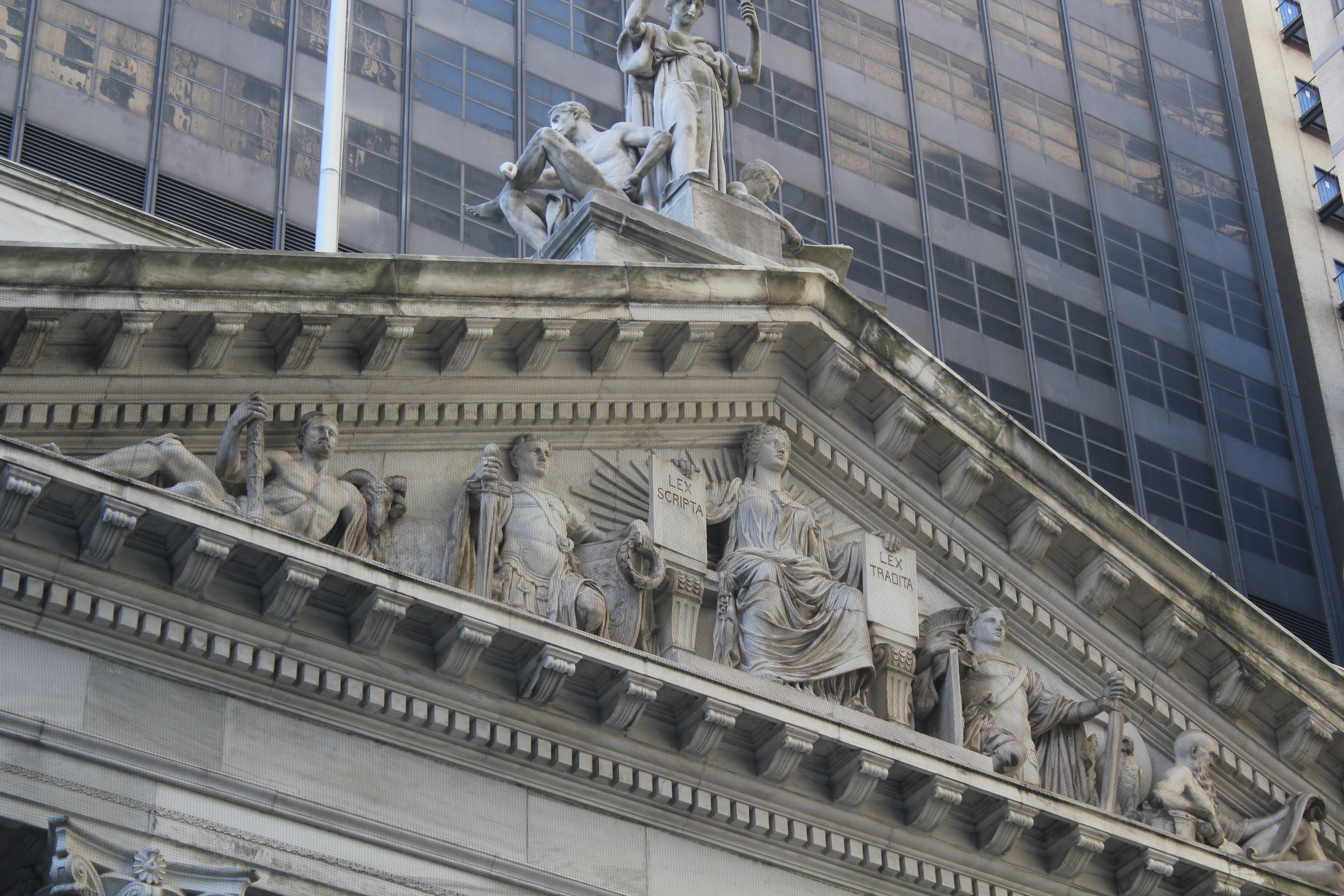
Pediment on 25th Street

In June 1895, the New York City Sinking Fund Commission approved the Appellate Division's request to rent the third floor of the Constable Building at 111 Fifth Avenue, at the intersection with 19th Street, for two years. The justices wanted to develop a permanent courthouse, and they first looked to the site of the Sixth Avenue streetcar depot between 43rd and 44th Streets. The New York City Bar Association was developing its own building on part of the depot site, and the remainder of the lot would have accommodated the court's 50,000-volume library easily.

The justices also considered a site at the intersection of Madison Avenue and 25th Street. The latter site was within a 30-minute walk of four of the justices' houses, but the New York City Comptroller thought the site was "rather expensive". At the time, the site at Madison Avenue was occupied by the houses of Henry C. Miner and Edward H. Peaslee. A group of commissioners was appointed to assess the 25th Street site before it was acquired through eminent domain. The commissioners determined in April 1896 that Miner's land lot was worth $283,000 (Note: About $9.152 million in 2024) and that Peaslee's lot was worth $87,500. (Note: About $2.83 million in 2024) The acquisition was approved in spite of the New York City Comptroller's concerns that the valuation of approximately $370,000 (Note: About $11.966 million in 2024) was evidence of cronyism, since Miner was, at the time, a U.S. Representative. There was a delay in issuing construction contracts due to difficulties in acquiring the site.

==== Construction ====
The justices subsequently received permission from the state government to hire an architect without an architectural design competition. Later in 1896, James Brown Lord was hired to design a three-story marble courthouse at a cost of $650,000, (Note: About $21.021 million in 2024) with various allegorical statues and porticoes on Madison Avenue and 25th Street. Although the justices claimed that they had selected Lord simply because he was the most qualified candidate, Lord's father was a lawyer with the firm of Lord Day & Lord, which his grandfather Daniel Lord had founded. Lord was paid $3,500 to draw up the initial plans, (Note: About $113,000 in 2024) with the stipulation that he would be retained as supervising architect if his plans were approved. The building plans were jointly approved in June 1896 by the city sinking fund commissioners and the Appellate Division justices.

Lord organized a committee, which included Augustus Saint-Gaudens and Daniel Chester French, to invite select sculptors to design the statuary without a design competition. This provoked complaints from some sculptors, including Fernando Miranda y Casellas, who called it an "insulting presumption that only the elect should have a chance to compete". After 16 sculptors had been hired for the project, Lord appointed himself as the chairman of a four-man committee that oversaw the design of the statues. The courthouse's architectural drawings were finally approved in December 1897, at which point the building was expected to cost $700,000. (Note: About $22.638 million in 2024) Ten contractors submitted bids for the project later that month. Charles T. Wills received the contract for $638,968, (Note: About $20.664 million in 2024) less than Lord's estimate of $659,000. (Note: About $21.312 million in 2024) Although there were four bids that were lower than Wills's bid, the justices rejected these other bids due to "irregularities".

Lord filed plans for the site with the city's Department of Buildings in March 1898. As the site of the courthouse was being excavated, Lord discovered that stone from the site was strong enough to be reused for the courthouse's foundation walls. As a result, he decided not to order brick for the foundations, thereby saving thousands of dollars. On the suggestion of the then-new National Society of Mural Painters, Lord had hired several artists to paint murals in the building by early 1898. The city government authorized the issuance of $897,000 in bonds, (Note: About $22.368 million in 2024) including $638,000 for the new courthouse, that June. (Note: About $20.475 million in 2024) The next month, the city began looking to sell $10 million worth of bonds, (Note: About $320.921 million in 2024) including $390,000 for the courthouse. (Note: About $12.516 million in 2024) There was relatively little media coverage of the building during its construction; by March 1899, the courthouse had been completed up to the first floor.

=== 1900s to 1940s ===
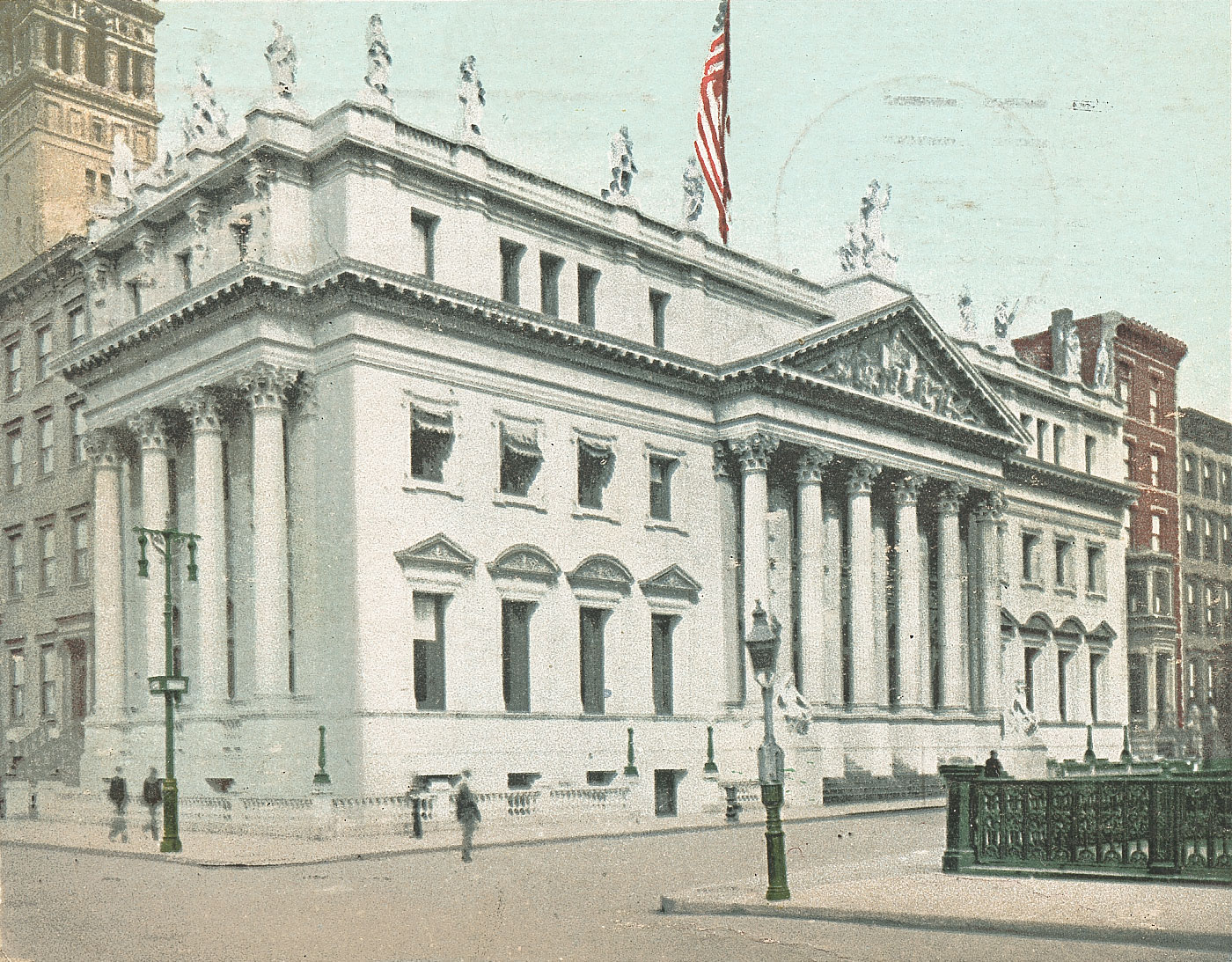
A postcard of the courthouse from the early 1900s

Work on the courthouse was nearly complete when, on December 20, 1899, Lord invited a small group of guests, including Appellate Division justices and their friends, to tour the interior. The Appellate Division, First Department, had moved the last of its furnishings from its old courthouse on Fifth Avenue by the end of that month. The First Department formally took possession of the new courthouse at 1:00 p.m. on January 2, 1900, with speeches from each of the department's seven justices. At the time, none of the sculptures, except the caryatids on Madison Avenue, had been finished. The city's Sinking Fund Commission agreed to pay Wills $1,234 per month until May 1900, (Note: About $47,756 in 2024) when the lighting and the heating plant were scheduled for completion. All of the sculptures had been installed by mid-1900, except for the Force and Wisdom statues at the courthouse's main entrance.

The courthouse had cost $633,768, (Note: About $20.14 million in 2024) less than the $700,000 that had been budgeted for the project. This stood in contrast to other municipal projects like the Manhattan Municipal Building; the Hall of Records; and the Williamsburg, Manhattan, and Queensboro bridges, all of which had gone significantly over budget. The decorations alone cost $211,300, (Note: About $6.712 million in 2024) which Lord said was justified by the fact that artwork on public buildings was invaluable to the city. At the time of the new courthouse's opening, Midtown Manhattan was growing into a business center, leading the lawyer Austen George Fox to say that the Appellate Division's relocation had been a "wise move".

In its early years, the courthouse mainly was used to hear appeals of cases that had been decided by a lower court, such as the New York Supreme Court. The courthouse was also used to conduct examinations of the "character and fitness" of prospective lawyers, such as bar examinations, and it held events such as a memorial service for First Department justice Edward Patterson. Originally, the Appellate Division Courthouse had a 48-foot-tall (15 m) chimney, but this was expanded in 1908 because the construction of a neighboring building blocked the chimney's opening, forcing gas and dirty air back into the courthouse. At the 25th anniversary of the First Department in 1921, the department had heard 30,000 appeals, most in the courthouse.

By 1936, there were plans to relocate the Appellate Division's First Department due to overcrowding. Mayor Fiorello La Guardia proposed converting the Appellate Division Courthouse into a municipal art center that presented theatrical performances. The state acquired a site at 99 Park Avenue (between 39th and 40th Streets) and filed plans for a new appellate courthouse at that site in early 1938, although officials predicted that the new courthouse would not be completed for several years. Plans for the replacement courthouse had been paused by that October, when funding earmarked for the new courthouse was used instead to finance the construction of the Belt Parkway. Afterward, La Guardia unsuccessfully proposed in June 1939 that the Appellate Division Courthouse be converted into a public health museum. The city's health commissioner John L. Rice requested $50,000 for the renovation that August. (Note: About $0.882 million in 2024) The replacement courthouse was ultimately never built, as the city announced plans in 1949 to sell the Park Avenue site, which was acquired by a developer the next year.

=== 1950s expansion ===
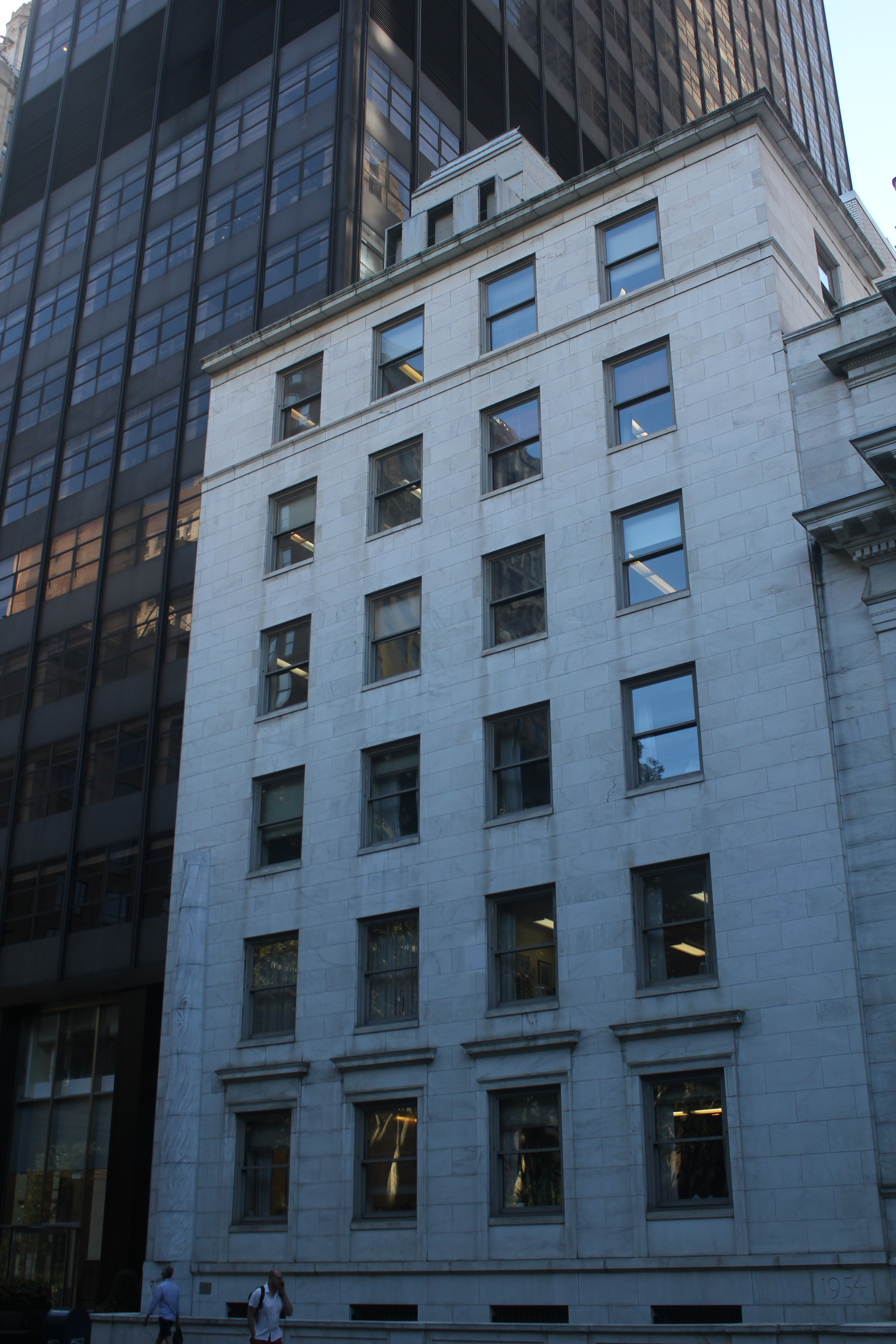
The annex built in the 1950s

In late 1950, the city's public works commissioner Frederick Zurmuhlen approved an $800,000 (Note: About $8.248 million in 2024) plan by architecture firm Rogers & Butler to erect a six-story annex to the courthouse. The annex would add 25,200 square feet (2,340 m^{2}) of space, including an enlarged library and six justices' chambers, while the existing building would be retrofitted with two additional justices' chambers. Zurmuhlen also planned to install a steam-and-warm-air heating plant in the existing courthouse, replace the masonry and stone on the facade, add air conditioning to part of the interior, and repair the roof. Rogers & Butler filed plans for the annex in July 1952, at which point the building was projected to cost $1,184,761; (Note: About $11.205 million in 2024) the city borrowed $1.25 million to pay for the project. (Note: About $11.82 million in 2024)

The building's sculptures had become rundown by the 1950s, when the New York Herald Tribune reported that some of the sculptures were standing "only by the grace of guy wires". As part of the renovation, Zurmuhlen announced in January 1953 that the sculptures would be taken down. A restoration expert had estimated that the cost of replacing the works would be similar to the cost of the building's renovation, which was expected to range from $1.2 million to $1.4 million; (Note: About $11.204–13.071 million in 2024) Zurmuhlen claimed that restoring the sculptures was cost-prohibitive. Instead, Zurmuhlen asked local museums if they wanted the sculptures. The Public Works Department received 25 bids for the sculptures from places such as St. Louis and the government of Indonesia. That March, Zurmuhlen announced that the city would spend $8,500 to restore the sculptures. (Note: About $113,745 in 2025) Sources disagree on why Zurmuhlen changed his plans for the sculptures; The New York Times cited a survey expressing interest in the sculptures and extensive public opposition to their removal, while the New York Herald Tribune said Zurmuhlen changed his mind after the department conducted a survey of its own.

The governments of three majority-Muslim nations, namely Indonesia, Pakistan, and Egypt, asked the United States Department of State to compel the Appellate Division to remove or destroy the Mohammed sculpture, as some sects of Islam prohibited visual depictions of Muhammad. The sculpture's existence was largely unknown before the plans to remove the sculptures were publicly announced. Work on the annex commenced in June 1953, and a renovation of the existing building began in October 1954; the entire project was completed by 1956. The First Department's justices agreed to permanently remove Mohammed, and the sculptures were all removed and transported to Newark, New Jersey, for restoration. All of the statues were restored and reinstalled, except for Mohammed, which ended up in a field in New Jersey. The existing building's offices were completed in June 1955. Workers lowered the ceilings, removed fireplaces and plasterwork, and replaced wood within the original building's offices.

=== 1960s to present ===
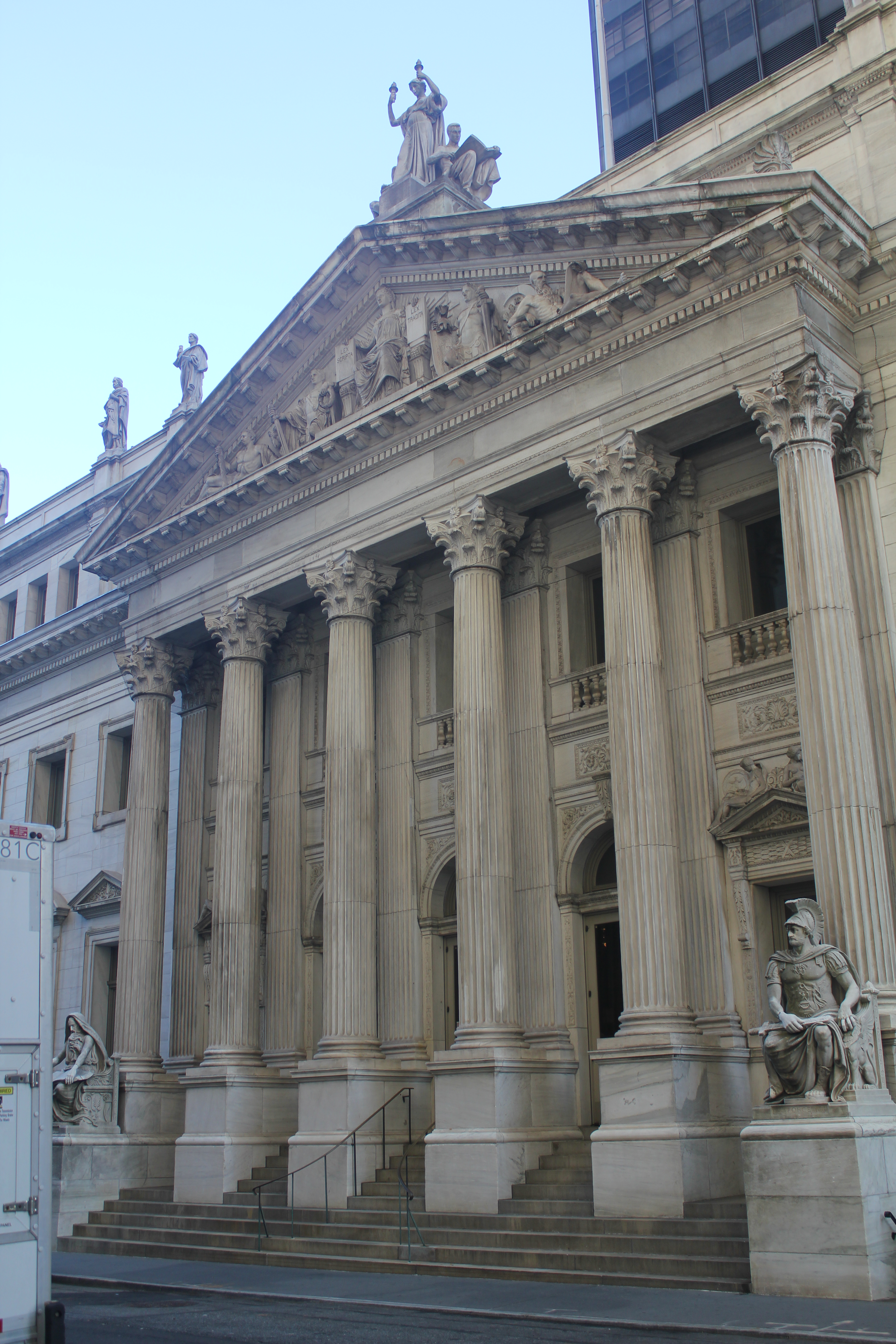
Main entrance on 25th Street

The New York City Landmarks Preservation Commission (LPC) hosted hearings in April 1966 to determine whether the Appellate Division Courthouse should be designated as a city landmark. The building's exterior was designated as a city landmark that June. The city's real-estate commissioner, Ira Duchan, leased 100,000 square feet (9,300 m^{2}) of the site's unused air rights to the developer of the neighboring New York Merchandise Mart in April 1970, which allowed the Merchandise Mart to be built with more floor area than was typically permitted for its site. This was the first time that air rights above a city-owned structure had been leased. As part of the agreement, the Merchandise Mart's developer Samuel Rudin agreed to pay out $3.45 million (Note: About $21.442 million in 2024) to the New York City government over 75 years. After obtaining the courthouse and its air rights, Rudin subleased the courthouse back to the city government. The Supreme Court also leased space on the Merchandise Mart's second floor, demolishing part of an existing wall to link the courthouse with the Merchandise Mart space. The city also acquired a pair of brownstone residences to the east, with the intention of expanding the courthouse further. The houses were demolished by 1972 and their sites used for parking; the expansion was canceled in 1979, and the land was sold three years later.

By the early 1980s, both the facade and interior were deteriorating. Pieces of the sculptures had fallen onto the street, and, in one case, a stained-glass pane fell out of the courtroom's ceiling dome during a trial. The interior of the courthouse was designated a New York City landmark in 1981, and the entire building was added to the National Register of Historic Places in 1982. The New York City government spent $642,000 (Note: About $1.694 million in 2024) during the early 1980s to renovate the sculptures and ceiling dome. A bust of 19th-century lawyer Charles O'Conor was moved from the courthouse's lobby to its basement in 1982 after the First Department's chief justice, Francis T. Murphy, learned that O'Conor had actively opposed freeing black slaves in New York state. Murphy also proposed a Holocaust memorial on the building in 1986. Sixty-two artists participated in a design competition for the memorial, with Feigenbaum being selected in 1988. It was dedicated on May 22, 1990, having cost $200,000. (Note: About $0.423 million in 2024)

Queens-based firm Nab Interiors was hired in 1999 to restore the interior of the courthouse for $1.5 million. (Note: About $2.648 million in 2024) Over the next year, architectural firm Platt Byard Dovell White restored the courtroom in conjunction with restoration consultant Building Conservation Associates. Once the interior renovations had been completed, Platt Byard Dovell White restored the facade, in collaboration with the Rambusch Decorating Company. The facade restoration took place from 2002 to 2004. The courthouse continues to house the Appellate Division's First Department in the 21st century, although the department had expanded to 16 judges by the 2000s. The Village Voice wrote in 2007 that, since the department did not hear any jury trials, only judges, their staff, and lawyers were allowed into the courthouse. The sculpture NOW was mounted atop the building in 2023, and a plaque honoring U.S. District Court judge Constance Baker Motley was dedicated the next year.

== Reception ==
At the time of the courthouse's construction, the American Architect and Building News predicted that "the rest of the country will envy New York the possession of this building". The New-York Tribune wrote that the building "will have no peer, it is confidently believed, even among the imposing-looking courts of justice which the Old World is able to present". When the courthouse was nearly finished, The New York Times praised the abundance of murals, while the New York World upheld it as an example of fine public architecture. The World article likened the courthouse to non-municipal buildings with statuary, such as the New York Public Library Main Branch and U.S. Custom House, rather than to municipal buildings without such features, like the Tweed Courthouse and the City Hall Post Office.

After the courthouse opened, Charles DeKay wrote in The Independent that it "shines like an ivory casket among boxes of ordinary maple". DeKay believed that the small size of the Madison Avenue frontage gave the appearance that the building was "part of a larger structure". Richard Ladegast wrote for Outlook that Lord should be "complimented upon his good taste in building, as it were, a frame for some fine pictures and a pedestal for not a few imposing pieces of sculpture". The Scientific American said the courthouse "is the most ambitious attempt yet realized in this country of a highly decorated public building". According to the Scientific American, the murals were merit-worthy but too "abstract and philosophical" for an American courthouse. The Municipal Art Society of Baltimore used photographs of the completed courthouse as an inspiration for decorations on Baltimore's then-new Clarence M. Mitchell Jr. Courthouse. One of the courthouse's original justices said the decorators and artists "seem to have conspired with the architect to woo our spirits back from these sombre robes and waft us back to youthful dreams of fairyland".

The New Yorker called the building "the rather pleasant little Appellate Court House with its ridiculous adornment of mortuary statuary" in 1928, while The New York Times wrote in 1935 that the courthouse had a plethora of exterior sculpture. The building was featured in a 1977 exhibition, "Temple of Justice", at the clubhouse of the New York City Bar Association. Writing about that show in The New York Times, architectural critic Ada Louise Huxtable contrasted the courthouse's classical features with the plain facade the Merchandise Mart. Other New York Times columnists likened the interiors to a Midwestern businessman's residence and a "small marble palace". Eric P. Nash wrote in The New York Times in 1994 that the design details, particularly the sculptures and the murals, "attract the eye and engage the mind".

Commentary of the building continued in the 21st century. Matthew Postal of the LPC described the building in 2009 as an exemplar of the City Beautiful movement. The historian Barbaralee Diamonstein-Spielvogel wrote in 2011 that "the interiors represent a zenith in the synthesis of architecture, decorative arts, and fine arts". An AM New York Metro article from 2025 said the building exhibited "Progressive Era aesthetic values" while also functioning as a backdrop for more modern artwork.

== See also ==
- List of New York City Designated Landmarks in Manhattan from 14th to 59th Streets
- National Register of Historic Places listings in Manhattan from 14th to 59th Streets
- New York County Courthouse
- Public sculptures by Daniel Chester French
