= Mariam Chamberlain =

American activist (1918–2013)

Mariam Kenosian Chamberlain
- Born: Mariam Kenosian; April 24, 1918; Chelsea, Massachusetts
- Died: April 1, 2013 (aged 94); New York, NY
- Education: Radcliffe College; Harvard University
- Known for: establishing women’s studies and financing research into gender-based inequities
- Spouse(s): Neil W. Chamberlain, 1942-1970 div
- Scientific career
- Fields: Economics
- Workplaces: Connecticut College; Columbia University; Hunter College; Ford Foundation; National Council for Research on Women

Mariam Chamberlain (April 24, 1918 – April 1, 2013) was a feminist activist.

== Biography ==
She was born Mariam Kenosian in Chelsea, Massachusetts, April 24, 1918. She earned a PhD in economics from Harvard University in 1950 (her dissertation was titled "Investment Policies of Large Corporations"), after pausing in her studies to work as an analyst for the Office of Strategic Services during World War II. In 1942, she married Neil W. Chamberlain, who taught economics at Yale University and Columbia University; they divorced in 1967. She herself held teaching positions at Connecticut College, the Columbia University School of General Studies, and at Hunter College before joining the Ford Foundation.

From 1971 to 1981, she was a program director for the Ford Foundation, and as such granted approximately $5 million in seed money to several dozen academic studies, sociological projects, and statistical surveys that led to the founding of women's studies departments and public policy research programs. In 1972, the Center for Women Policy Studies was founded in Washington with one of her grants. In 1977, she gave a small grant to help establish the National Women’s Studies Association. She also funded The Feminist Press.

In 1982, Chamberlain left the Ford Foundation to head the Task Force on Women in Higher Education at the Russell Sage Foundation, which published Women in Academe: Progress and Prospects. She also funded a meeting of a group of women’s research centers; the meeting established the National Council for Research on Women, which unanimously elected her its first president. She retired as president in 1989, but continued on as Founding President and Resident Scholar. She was also a founding member of the Institute for Women's Policy Research, and served on its board of directors for almost 20 years; it endowed the Mariam K. Chamberlain Fellowship in Women and Public Policy in her honor.
