= Robert Stackhouse =

American sculptor (born 1942)

- Born: 1942 (age 83–84); Bronxville, New York
- Known for: Sculpture
- Notable work: Confluence
- Movement: Feminist art movement
- Spouse: Carol Mickett
- Partner: Mary Beth Edelson (1972–1999)
- Website: mickettstackhouse.com

Ruby's Heart by Robert Stackhouse, 1988, Honolulu Museum of Art

Robert Stackhouse (born 1942) is an American artist and sculptor.

Stackhouse graduated with a bachelor's degree from the University of South Florida in 1965. He later earned a master's degree at the University of Maryland, College Park in studio art. USF's Contemporary Art Museum contains an archive of his work, with copies of all of his prints over the course of his career.

A-frames are a frequent theme in the artist's paintings and sculpture. Ruby's Heart, in the collection of the Honolulu Museum of Art, is an example of this recurring minimalist subject. Stackhouse's work has been featured in one-man exhibitions in museums such as the Corcoran Gallery of Art in Washington, D.C., and his work has been compared to that of Harriet Feigenbaum.

The artist Mary Beth Edelson lived with Stackhouse for 27 years.

== See also ==
- Confluence by Stackhouse and Carol Mickett in the collection of the Indianapolis Art Center
