= Confluence (sculpture) =

Land art sculpture by Robert Stackhouse and Carol Mickett

- Artist: Robert Stackhouse & Carol Mickett
- Year: 2004
- Type: Indiana limestone
- Location: Indianapolis Art Center; Indianapolis, Indiana, United States; 39°52′39.33″N 86°8′40.09″W
- Owner: Indianapolis Art Center

Confluence is a land art sculpture by artists Robert Stackhouse and Carol Mickett. The work sits on the grounds of the Indianapolis Art Center located in Indianapolis, Indiana, United States. Confluence was installed as part of the Art Center's ARTSPARK initiative.

== Description ==
Confluence consists of 100 tons of Indiana limestone cascading in height in a 70-foot boat-like shape. The second part of the artwork lies along the White River, further into the ARTSPARK. Words are chiseled into the vertical stones with one statement reading "My soul has grown deep like the rivers."

== Creation ==
Stackhouse and Mickett created the piece in residency at the Art Center during the summer of 2004. The installation utilized motorized chisels, gas-powered saws and hammers to create the columns. Stackhouse oversaw the work on the vertical stones and Mickett handled the arranging of the bases. Visitors to the Art Center were encouraged to participate by being allowed to don goggles, dust masks and gloves to contribute to the creation process.

== Acquisition ==
This piece was the first installation acquired for the Art Center's ARTSPARK which, designed by Michael Graves, brings together art and nature. The artwork was a gift from Michael and Mary Ann Browning.
