= Thomas Hyclak =

American economist

Thomas Hyclak (born August 4, 1947) is an American economist and Economics Professor. He has acted as the chair of the economics department of Lehigh University of Bethlehem, Pennsylvania (where he has taught since 1979) and is now the Interim Dean of their business school. Most of his research has to do with labor studies, urban-regional economics, and wage studies. He is currently studying labor aspects of the transition to a market economy in Poland. He has published numerous academic papers on regional unemployment, wage and income inequality, gender and racial wage differentials and human resource management practices. Notably, he is the author of “Rising Wage Inequality: The 1980s Experience in Urban Labor Markets” as well as the textbook “Fundamentals Of Labor Economics,” also written by Geraint Johnes and Robert J. Thornton. Tom Hyclak earned his B.A. and M.A. from Cleveland State University and his Ph.D. from the University of Notre Dame. He also serves as a member of the Allentown Urban Observatory and the Board of Directors of the Community Action Development Corporation of Bethlehem, which fosters entrepreneurship and business development in South Bethlehem.

== Selected publications ==
- Rising Wage Inequality: The 1980s Experience in Urban Labor Markets, W.E. Upjohn Institute for Employment Research, 2000.
- Fundamentals Of Labor Economics, Houghton Mifflin College Division, 2005 (with Geraint Johnes and Robert J. Thornton)
- Wage Flexibility and Unemployment Dynamics in Regional Labor Markets. W.E. Upjohn Institute for Employment Research, 1992 (with G. Johnes).
- "Wage Inflation and the Post-1991 Duration Puzzle," Economics Letters, Vol. 73, No. 1 October 2001, 97-104 (with Jonathan Ohn).
- North American Health Policy in the 1990s, John Wiley, 1993, (edited with A. King, S. McMahon and R. Thornton).
- Economic Aspects of Regional Trading Arrangements. Wheatsheaf Books, 1989. (edited with D. Greenaway and R.J. Thornton).
- "Why Strikes Occur: Evidence From the Capital Markets," (with Jonathan K. Kramer)
