= Memorial to Victims of the Injustice of the Holocaust =

Memorial by Harriet Feigenbaum in New York City, U.S.

Coordinates: 40°44′33″N 73°59′12″W

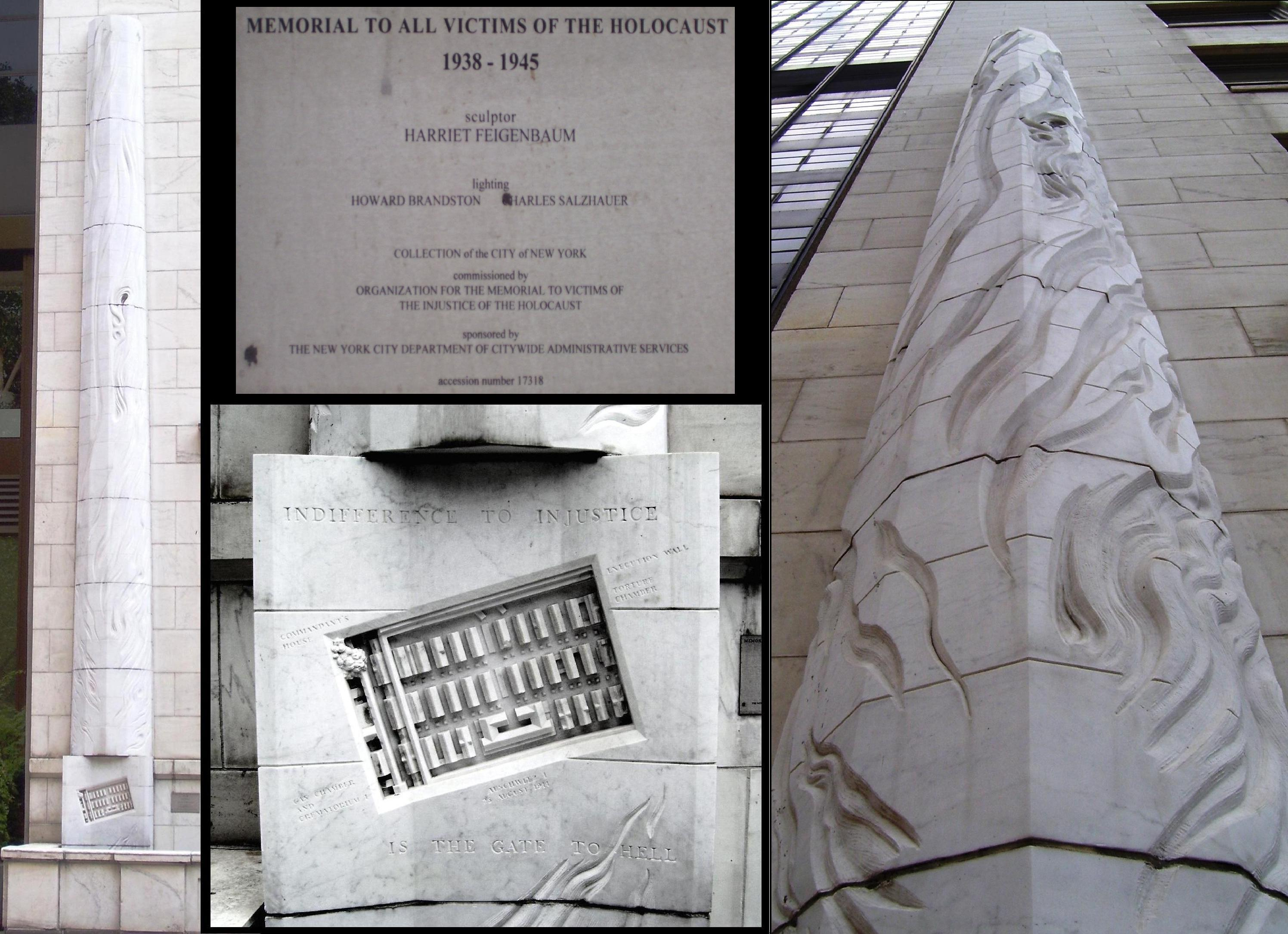
Clockwise from left: The full memorial; dedication plaque; detail of column; closeup of base

The Memorial to Victims of the Injustice of the Holocaust is a Holocaust memorial sculpture by Harriet Feigenbaum on the side of the Appellate Division Courthouse of New York State, at Madison Avenue and 25th Street in Manhattan, New York City.

== Background ==
Presiding Justice Francis T. Murphy and Clerk of the Court Harold J. Reynolds conceived the idea of creating a Holocaust memorial monument at the Appellate Division courthouse. Several members of the court were concerned by what they viewed as an increasing indifference to injustice, which could undermine the court system. The justices believed a Holocaust memorial could symbolize these concerns, and a private committee of lawyers raised $200,000 in funding. Feigenbaum won the 1988 competition to design the memorial, with a proposal to feature a replica of an aerial photograph of the Auschwitz concentration camp taken by American planes as they bombed German oil factories nearby on August 25, 1944.

== Sculpture ==
The sculpture is titled Memorial to Victims of the Injustice of the Holocaust. The New York City Department of Cultural Affairs (DCLA) describes it as "a six-sided half column rising 27 feet above its base. The five-sided concave base extends one story below ground level, the overall height of the Memorial being 38 feet. Carvings of flames along the length of the column recall the flames of the gas chambers at Auschwitz. They appear to blow in the direction of the courthouse as if to threaten the symbol of Justice. A relief of an aerial view of the main camp at Auschwitz is carved into the base at eye level...On the base under the relief is a giant flame extending below ground level as a final reminder of Crematorium 1 at Auschwitz." The words "Indifference to Injustice is the Gate to Hell" are engraved around the image. Justice Murphy and Mr. Reynolds wrote the inscription.

Feigenbaum's carving noted five of the specific points within the Auschwitz camp that were visible in the original photograph: Torture Chamber [identified in the photograph as Block 11], Execution Wall, Gas Chamber and Crematorium 1, Commandant's House.

== Significance of the 1944 photograph ==
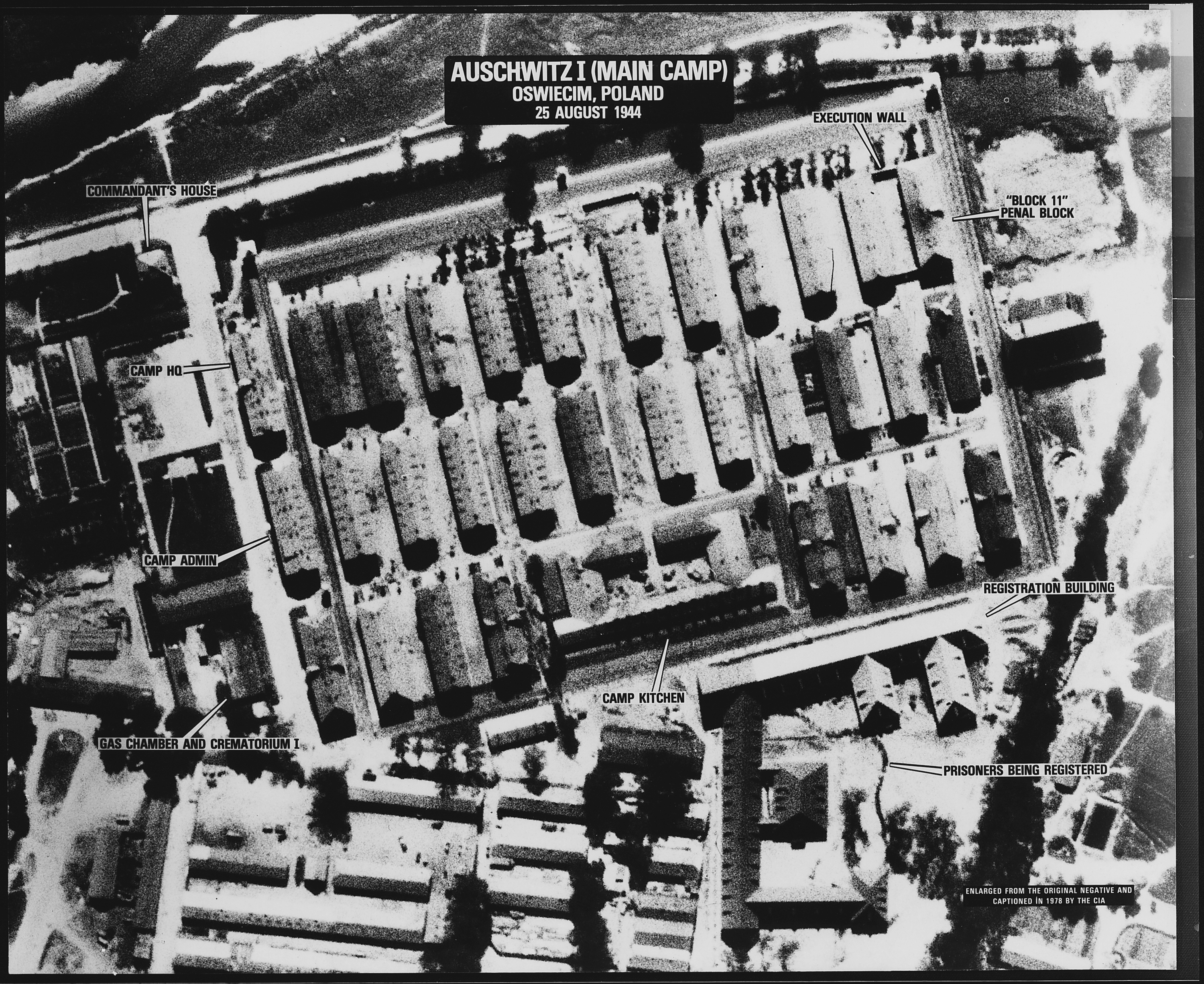
The 1944 USAAF photograph replicated at the base of the memorial

Feingenbaum was born in the United States in 1939 and lost relatives in the Holocaust. In a 1990 interview with the New Yorker, she described the sensitivity of creating the artwork as someone who had never visited Auschwitz, saying “Being a Jew alive in this time, when there are still Holocaust survivors, makes Holocaust art hard to do.” Explaining that while she could have visited Auschwitz as part of her preparation, she decided against it. "This work is made by someone who didn't live through it - I had to keep the truth of that. Then I saw an aerial photograph of the camp from 1944, reproduced in the Times, and I decided to use it as a plan for the relief. There's a certain mystery about it; the aerial view gives it a certain vagueness. If I had gone there, and looked at the camp as it is today, I'd be too literal, and some of the mystery would be gone."

The photo was first shared with the public in 1979, as part of a report released by two Central Intelligence Agency analysts who said they used new technology and eyewitness accounts to interpret photos taken in 1944. The photos were taken as part of reconnaissance and bombing by the Allied forces of the I.G. Farben petro-chemical plant, located less than 5 miles from the Auschwitz camp. The photos are significant because of the Auschwitz bombing debate as they demonstrate that U.S. planes had the ability to bomb the death camp. The DCLA website for the memorial indicates, "by the selection of this photograph, the artist is saying that the Allies must have known of the camp and they took no action."
