= Harriet Feigenbaum =

American ecofeminist artist and sculptor

Harriet Feigenbaum (born 1939) is an American ecofeminist artist and sculptor. Many of her works are publicly displayed or in collections in New York. Her later work focused on reclamation projects, often of old mining cites, in Pennsylvania. Robert Stackhouse's work has been compared to Feigenbaum's.

== List of important works, in chronological order ==
- (1976) Tantric, Cornell University.
- (1977) Cycles II--Land Structures Built Where the Petroglyphs Are Made by Children, Artpark, Lewiston, New York.
- (1978) Widow's Walk and Dog Run, Harriman Park Palisades, New York.
- (1978) Battery Park City-A Mirage, Creative Time, Inc., New York, New York.
- (1978) Parking Lot Pentagon off Washington Avenue, New York City, New York.
- (1978) An Octagonal Domed Building.
- (1983) Dickson City Land Waves: Valley of 8000 Pines.
- (1984) Dickson City Land Waves: Black Walnut Forest (incomplete)
- (1988) Greenwood Colliery Sundial
- (1989) Distant Landscape, Colgate University Picker Art Gallery, Hamilton, New York.
- (1990) Memorial to Victims of the Injustice of the Holocaust, New York City, New York.

== Legacy and impact ==
Feigenbaum was the subject of Phyllis Koestenbaum's poem, "Harriet Feigenbaum Is a Sculptor", published in Poetry New York, which was included in the 1993 volume of The Best American Poetry series, and later reprinted in her collection Doris Day and Kitschy Melodies.

== Personal life ==
Feigenbaum married Neil W. Chamberlain in 1968. In 1988 Feigenbaum, who is Jewish, designed a memorial of the Auschwitz concentration camp for the Appellate Division Courthouse of New York State.
