= Geraint Johnes =

Geraint Johnes FLSW is Professor of Economics at Lancaster University Management School.

He was previously Lecturer, Senior Lecturer and Reader in Economics at Lancaster, and has spent periods as a visitor to institutions in the USA (Dartmouth College, Lehigh University) and Australia (Australian National University). He has served as honorary visiting professor at Beijing Normal University, and is an associate fellow of SKOPE at Oxford University and Cardiff University and of the Robert Owen Centre for Educational Change at the University of Glasgow. From 2014 to 2015, he was Director of the Work Foundation. He frequently provides media commentary on labour market issues, regularly appearing on television (BBC, Sky News, France 24, DW, RT, ABC etc.) and radio.

He has published widely in the area of the economics of education, including papers in the Economic Journal, Oxford Economic Papers and Oxford Bulletin of Economics and Statistics. He has also published in the area of regional economics (with papers in the Journal of Regional Science, Annals of Regional Science andRegional Studies) and labour economics (in journals including Economics Letters, Labour Economics, Public Finance, the Manchester School).

He is author of a number of economics textbooks He was founding editor of the journal Education Economics. His work has been funded by the DfES, DTI, Office for National Statistics, British Council, OECD, World Bank, and (under several different programmes) the EU.

He won the Economics LTSN award for outstanding teaching in 2003, and Lancaster University's teaching prize in 2006. His teaching and learning innovations include early use of interactive web-based quizzes (from 1997). In 2005, the Guardian newspaper described him as 'one of the world's pioneering academic podcasters' (17 August).

He was elected a Fellow of the Learned Society of Wales in 2015.

== Works ==
- Economics for Managers (Prentice Hall, 1990)
- The Economics of Education (Macmillan, 1993)
- Fundamentals of Labor Economics (co-authored with Thomas Hyclak and Robert Thornton - published by Houghton Mifflin, 2004
- European Integration: the Human Resource Dimension (MCB University Press, 1991)
- Recent Developments in the Economics of Education (with Elchanan Cohn, published by Edward Elgar, 1994)
- International Handbook on the Economics of Education (with Jill Johnes, published by Edward Elgar, 2004.
- An Exploratory Analysis of the Cost Structure of Higher Education in England (DfES, 2005) (jointly authored with Jill Johnes, Emmanuel Thanassoulis, Pamela Lenton and Ali Emrouznejad)
