= United States labor law =

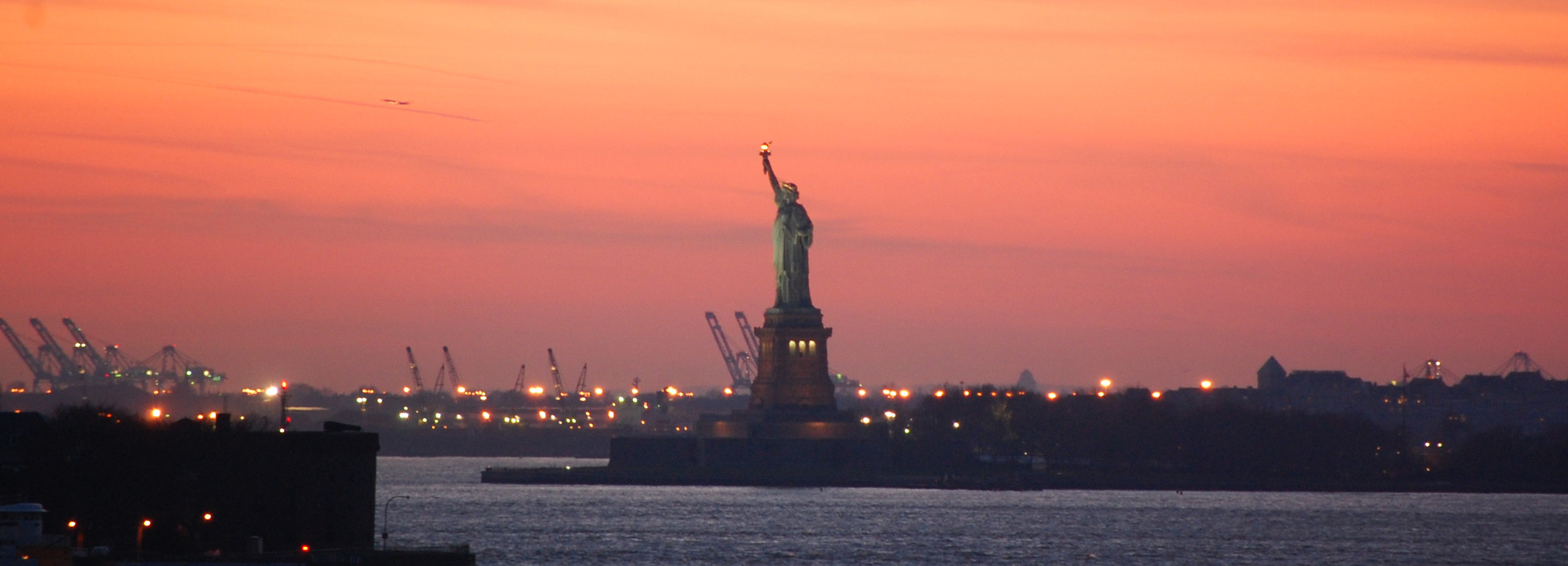
The Statue of Liberty greeted millions of people who migrated to America for work, saying "Give me your tired, your poor, Your huddled masses yearning to breathe free..." In 2013, in a 155.5 million working population, union membership was 35.9% in the public sector, 6.6% in the private sector. In 2017, unemployment was 4.3%, excluding people in prison. The US ranks 29th in the world inequality-adjusted human development index.

United States labor law sets the rights and duties for employees, labor unions, and employers in the US. Labor law's basic aim is to remedy the "inequality of bargaining power" between employees and employers, especially employers "organized in the corporate or other forms of ownership association". Over the 20th century, federal law created minimum social and economic rights, and encouraged state laws to go beyond the minimum to favor employees. The Fair Labor Standards Act of 1938 requires a federal minimum wage, currently $7.25 but higher in 29 states and D.C., and discourages working weeks over 40 hours through time-and-a-half overtime pay. There are no federal laws, and few state laws, requiring paid holidays or paid family leave. The Family and Medical Leave Act of 1993 creates a limited right to 12 weeks of unpaid leave in larger employers. There is no automatic right to an occupational pension beyond federally guaranteed Social Security, but the Employee Retirement Income Security Act of 1974 requires standards of prudent management and good governance if employers agree to provide pensions, health plans or other benefits. The Occupational Safety and Health Act of 1970 requires employees have a safe system of work.

A contract of employment can always create better terms than statutory minimum rights. But to increase their bargaining power to get better terms, employees organize labor unions for collective bargaining. The Clayton Act of 1914 guarantees all people the right to organize, and the National Labor Relations Act of 1935 creates rights for most employees to organize without detriment through unfair labor practices. Under the Labor Management Reporting and Disclosure Act of 1959, labor union governance follows democratic principles. If a majority of employees in a workplace support a union, employing entities have a duty to bargain in good faith. Unions can take collective action to defend their interests, including withdrawing their labor on strike. There are not yet general rights to directly participate in enterprise governance, but many employees and unions have experimented with securing influence through pension funds, and representation on corporate boards.

Since the Civil Rights Act of 1964, all employing entities and labor unions have a duty to treat employees equally, without discrimination based on "race, color, religion, sex, or national origin". There are separate rules for sex discrimination in pay under the Equal Pay Act of 1963. Additional groups with "protected status" were added by the Age Discrimination in Employment Act of 1967 and the Americans with Disabilities Act of 1990. There is no federal law banning all sexual orientation or identity discrimination, but 22 states had passed laws by 2016. These equality laws generally prevent discrimination in hiring and terms of employment, and make discharge because of a protected characteristic unlawful. In 2020, the Supreme Court of the United States ruled in Bostock v. Clayton County that discrimination solely on the grounds of sexual orientation or gender identity violates Title VII of the Civil Rights Act of 1964. There is no federal law against unjust discharge, and most states also have no law with full protection against wrongful termination of employment. Collective agreements made by labor unions and some individual contracts require that people are only discharged for a "just cause". The Worker Adjustment and Retraining Notification Act of 1988 requires employing entities give 60 days notice if more than 50 or one third of the workforce may lose their jobs. Federal law has aimed to reach full employment through monetary policy and spending on infrastructure. Trade policy has attempted to put labor rights in international agreements, to ensure open markets in a global economy do not undermine fair and full employment.

== History ==
After the Declaration of Independence, slavery in the US was progressively abolished in the north, but only finished by the 13th Amendment in 1865 near the end of the American Civil War.

Modern US labor law mostly comes from statutes passed between 1935 and 1974, and changing interpretations of the US Supreme Court. However, laws regulated the rights of people at work and employers from colonial times onward. Before the Declaration of Independence in 1776, the common law was either uncertain or hostile to labor rights. Unions were classed as conspiracies, and potentially criminal. It tolerated slavery and indentured servitude. From the Pequot War in Connecticut from 1636 onwards, Native Americans were enslaved by European settlers. More than half of the European immigrants arrived as prisoners, or in indentured servitude, where they were not free to leave their employers until a debt bond had been repaid. Until its abolition, the Atlantic slave trade brought millions of Africans to do forced labor in the Americas.

However, in 1772, the English Court of King's Bench held in Somerset v Stewart that slavery was to be presumed unlawful at common law. Charles Stewart from Boston, Massachusetts had bought James Somerset as a slave and taken him to England. With the help of abolitionists, Somerset escaped and sued for a writ of habeas corpus (that "holding his body" had been unlawful). Lord Mansfield, after declaring he should "let justice be done whatever be the consequence", held that slavery was "so odious" that nobody could take "a slave by force to be sold" for any "reason whatever". This was a major grievance of southern slave owning states, leading up to the American Revolution in 1776. The 1790 United States census recorded 694,280 slaves (17.8 per cent) of a total 3,893,635 population. After independence, the British Empire halted the Atlantic slave trade in 1807, and abolished slavery in its own territories, by paying off slave owners in 1833. In the US, northern states progressively abolished slavery. However, southern states did not. In Dred Scott v. Sandford the Supreme Court held the federal government could not regulate slavery, and also that people who were slaves had no legal rights in court. The American Civil War was the result. President Lincoln's Emancipation Proclamation in 1863 made abolition of slavery a war aim, and the Thirteenth Amendment of 1865 enshrined the abolition of most forms of slavery in the Constitution. Former slave owners were further prevented from holding people in involuntary servitude for debt by the Peonage Act of 1867. In 1868, the Fourteenth Amendment ensured equal access to justice, and the Fifteenth Amendment required that everyone would have the right to vote. The Civil Rights Act of 1875 was also meant to ensure equality in access to housing and transport, but in the Civil Rights Cases, the Supreme Court found it was "unconstitutional", ensuring that racial segregation would continue. In dissent, Harlan J said the majority was leaving people "practically at the mercy of corporations". Even if people were formally free, they remained factually dependent on property owners for work, income and basic services.

Labor is prior to and independent of capital. Capital is only the fruit of labor, and could never have existed if labor had not first existed. Labor is the superior of capital, and deserves much the higher consideration ... The prudent, penniless beginner in the world labors for wages awhile, saves a surplus with which to buy tools or land for himself, then labors on his own account another while, and at length hires another new beginner to help him. This is the just and generous and prosperous system which opens the way to all, gives hope to all, and consequent energy and progress and improvement of condition to all. No men living are more worthy to be trusted than those who toil up from poverty; none less inclined to take or touch aught which they have not honestly earned. Let them beware of surrendering a political power which they already possess, and which if surrendered will surely be used to close the door of advancement against such as they and to fix new disabilities and burdens upon them till all of liberty shall be lost.

— Abraham Lincoln, First Annual Message (1861)

Like slavery, common law repression of labor unions was slow to be undone. In 1806, Commonwealth v. Pullis held that a Philadelphia shoemakers union striking for higher wages was an illegal "conspiracy", even though corporations—combinations of employers—were lawful. Unions still formed and acted. The first federation of unions, the National Trades Union was established in 1834 to achieve a 10 hour working day, but it did not survive the soaring unemployment from the financial Panic of 1837. In 1842, Commonwealth v. Hunt, held that Pullis was wrong, after the Boston Journeymen Bootmakers' Society struck for higher wages. The first instance judge said unions would "render property insecure, and make it the spoil of the multitude, would annihilate property, and involve society in a common ruin". But in the Massachusetts Supreme Judicial Court, Shaw CJ held people "are free to work for whom they please, or not to work, if they so prefer" and could "agree together to exercise their own acknowledged rights, in such a manner as best to subserve their own interests." This stopped criminal cases, although civil cases persisted. In 1869 an organisation called the Knights of Labor was founded by Philadelphia artisans, joined by miners 1874, and urban tradesmen from 1879. It aimed for racial and gender equality, political education and cooperative enterprise, yet it supported the Alien Contract Labor Law of 1885 which suppressed workers migrating to the US under a contract of employment.

Industrial conflicts on railroads and telegraphs from 1883 led to the foundation of the American Federation of Labor in 1886, with the simple aim of improving workers wages, housing and job security "here and now". It also aimed to be the sole federation, to create a strong, unified labor movement. Business reacted with litigation. The Sherman Antitrust Act of 1890, which was intended to sanction business cartels acting in restraint of trade, was applied to labor unions. In 1895, the US Supreme Court in In re Debs affirmed an injunction, based on the Sherman Act, against the striking workers of the Pullman Company. The strike leader Eugene Debs was put in prison. In notable dissent among the judiciary, Holmes J argued in Vegelahn v. Guntner that any union taking collective action in good faith was lawful: even if strikes caused economic loss, this was equally legitimate as economic loss from corporations competing with one another. Holmes J was elevated to the US Supreme Court, but was again in a minority on labor rights. In 1905, Lochner v. New York held that New York limiting bakers' working day to 60 hours a week violated employers' freedom of contract. The Supreme Court majority supposedly unearthed this "right" in the Fourteenth Amendment, that no State should "deprive any person of life, liberty, or property, without due process of law." With Harlan J, Holmes J dissented, arguing that the "constitution is not intended to embody a particular economic theory" but is "made for people of fundamentally differing views". On questions of social and economic policy, courts should never declare legislation "unconstitutional". The Supreme Court, however, accelerated its attack on labor in Loewe v. Lawlor, holding that triple damages were payable by a striking union to its employers under the Sherman Act of 1890. This line of cases was finally quashed by the Clayton Act of 1914 §6. This removed labor from antitrust law, affirming that the "labor of a human being is not a commodity or article of commerce" and nothing "in the antitrust laws" would forbid the operation of labor organizations "for the purposes of mutual help".

In his State of the Union address of 1944, President Franklin D. Roosevelt urged that America develop Second Bill of Rights through legislation, including the right to fair employment, an end to unfair competition, to education, health, and social security.

Throughout the early 20th century, states enacted labor rights to advance social and economic progress. But despite the Clayton Act, and abuses of employers documented by the Commission on Industrial Relations from 1915, the Supreme Court struck labor rights down as unconstitutional, leaving management powers virtually unaccountable. In this Lochner era, the Courts held that employers could force workers to not belong to labor unions, that a minimum wage for women and children was void, that states could not ban employment agencies charging fees for work, that workers could not strike in solidarity with colleagues of other firms, and even that the federal government could not ban child labor. It also imprisoned socialist activists, who opposed the fighting in World War I, meaning that Eugene Debs ran as the Socialist Party's candidate for president in 1920 from prison. Critically, the courts held state and federal attempts to create Social Security to be unconstitutional. Because they were unable to save in safe public pensions, millions of people bought shares in corporations, causing massive growth in the stock market. Because the Supreme Court precluded regulation for good information on what people were buying, corporate promoters tricked people into paying more than stocks were really worth. The Wall Street Crash of 1929 wiped out millions of people's savings. Business lost investment and fired millions of workers. Unemployed people had less to spend with businesses. Business fired more people. There was a downward spiral into the Great Depression.

This led to the election of Franklin D. Roosevelt for president in 1932, who promised a "New Deal". Government committed to create full employment and a system of social and economic rights enshrined in federal law. But despite the Democratic Party's overwhelming electoral victory, the Supreme Court continued to strike down legislation, particularly the National Industrial Recovery Act of 1933, which regulated enterprise in an attempt to ensure fair wages and prevent unfair competition. Finally, after Roosevelt's second overwhelming victory in 1936, and Roosevelt's threat to create more judicial positions if his laws were not upheld, one Supreme Court judge switched positions. In West Coast Hotel Co. v. Parrish the Supreme Court found that minimum wage legislation was constitutional, letting the New Deal go on. In labor law, the National Labor Relations Act of 1935 guaranteed every employee the right to unionize, collectively bargain for fair wages, and take collective action, including in solidarity with employees of other firms. The Fair Labor Standards Act of 1938 created the right to a minimum wage, and time-and-a-half overtime pay if employers asked people to work over 40 hours a week. The Social Security Act of 1935 gave everyone the right to a basic pension and to receive insurance if they were unemployed, while the Securities Act of 1933 and the Securities Exchange Act of 1934 ensured buyers of securities on the stock market had good information. The Davis–Bacon Act of 1931 and Walsh–Healey Public Contracts Act of 1936 required that in federal government contracts, all employers would pay their workers fair wages, beyond the minimum, at prevailing local rates. To reach full employment and out of depression, the Emergency Relief Appropriation Act of 1935 enabled the federal government to spend huge sums of money on building and creating jobs. This accelerated as World War II began. In 1944, his health waning, Roosevelt urged Congress to work towards a "Second Bill of Rights" through legislative action, because "unless there is security here at home there cannot be lasting peace in the world" and "we shall have yielded to the spirit of Fascism here at home."

President Lyndon B. Johnson explains the Civil Rights Act of 1964 as it was signed, to end discrimination and segregation in voting, education, public services, and employment.

Although the New Deal had created a minimum safety net of labor rights, and aimed to enable fair pay through collective bargaining, a Republican-dominated Congress revolted when Roosevelt died. Against the veto of President Truman, the Taft–Hartley Act of 1947 limited the right of labor unions to take solidarity action, and enabled states to ban unions requiring all people in a workplace becoming union members. A series of Supreme Court decisions, held the National Labor Relations Act of 1935 not only created minimum standards, but stopped or "preempted" states enabling better union rights, even though there was no such provision in the statute. Labor unions became extensively regulated by the Labor Management Reporting and Disclosure Act of 1959. Post-war prosperity had raised people's living standards, but most workers who had no union, or job security rights remained vulnerable to unemployment. As well as the crisis triggered by Brown v. Board of Education, and the need to dismantle segregation, job losses in agriculture, particularly among African Americans was a major reason for the civil rights movement, culminating in the March on Washington for Jobs and Freedom led by Martin Luther King Jr. Although Roosevelt's Executive Order 8802 of 1941 had prohibited racial discrimination in the national defense industry, people still suffered discrimination because of their skin color across other workplaces. Also, despite the increasing numbers of women in work, sex discrimination was endemic. The government of John F. Kennedy introduced the Equal Pay Act of 1963, requiring equal pay for women and men. Lyndon B. Johnson introduced the Civil Rights Act of 1964, finally prohibiting discrimination against people for "race, color, religion, sex, or national origin." Slowly, a new generation of equal rights laws spread. At federal level, this included the Age Discrimination in Employment Act of 1967, the Pregnancy Discrimination Act of 1978, and the Americans with Disabilities Act of 1990, now overseen by the Equal Employment Opportunity Commission.

Bernie Sanders became the most successful Democratic Socialist presidential candidate since Eugene Debs, winning 22 states and 43.1% of votes in the 2016 Democratic primary. He co-authored the 2016 Democratic platform, before Hillary Clinton lost the electoral college to Donald Trump.

Although people, in limited fields, could claim to be equally treated, the mechanisms for fair pay and treatment were dismantled after the 1970s. The last major labor law statute, the Employee Retirement Income Security Act of 1974 created rights to well regulated occupational pensions, although only where an employer had already promised to provide one: this usually depended on collective bargaining by unions. But in 1976, the Supreme Court in Buckley v. Valeo held anyone could spend unlimited amounts of money on political campaigns, as a part of the First Amendment right to "freedom of speech". After the Republican President Reagan took office in 1981, he dismissed all air traffic control staff who went on strike, and replaced the National Labor Relations Board members with pro-management men. Dominated by Republican appointees, the Supreme Court suppressed labor rights, removing rights of professors, religious school teachers, or illegal immigrants to organize in a union, allowing employees to be searched at work, and eliminating employee rights to sue for medical malpractice in their own health care. Only limited statutory changes were made. The Immigration Reform and Control Act of 1986 criminalized large numbers of migrants. The Worker Adjustment and Retraining Notification Act of 1988 guaranteed workers some notice before a mass termination of their jobs. The Family and Medical Leave Act of 1993 guaranteed a right to 12 weeks leave to take care for children after birth, all unpaid. The Small Business Job Protection Act of 1996 cut the minimum wage, by enabling employers to take the tips of their staff to subsidize the minimum wage. A series of proposals by Democratic and independent politicians to advance labor rights were not enacted, and the United States began to fall behind most other developed countries in labor rights.

In relation to federal government contracting, Executive Order 13673, entitled Fair Pay and Safe Workplaces, was issued by President Barack Obama on 31 July 2014. It contained "new requirements designed to increase efficiency and cost savings in the Federal contracting process", specifically referring to "contracting with responsible sources who comply with labor laws". The Occupational Safety and Health Administration published guidance on 25 August 2016. The order listed 14 federal laws which were defined as "labor laws", and extended coverage to "equivalent state laws". A breach of any of these laws during the three year period preceding the contract award was treated as non-compliance; for a contract valued over $500,000, contracting officers were to consider such violations, and any corrective actions taken by the business concerned, in determining contract award. Similar provisions were built into sub-contracting arrangements. To support compliance, each federal agency was required to appoint a "Labor Compliance Advisor". The order was revoked by President Donald Trump on 27 March 2017 under Executive Order 13782.

== Contract and rights at work ==
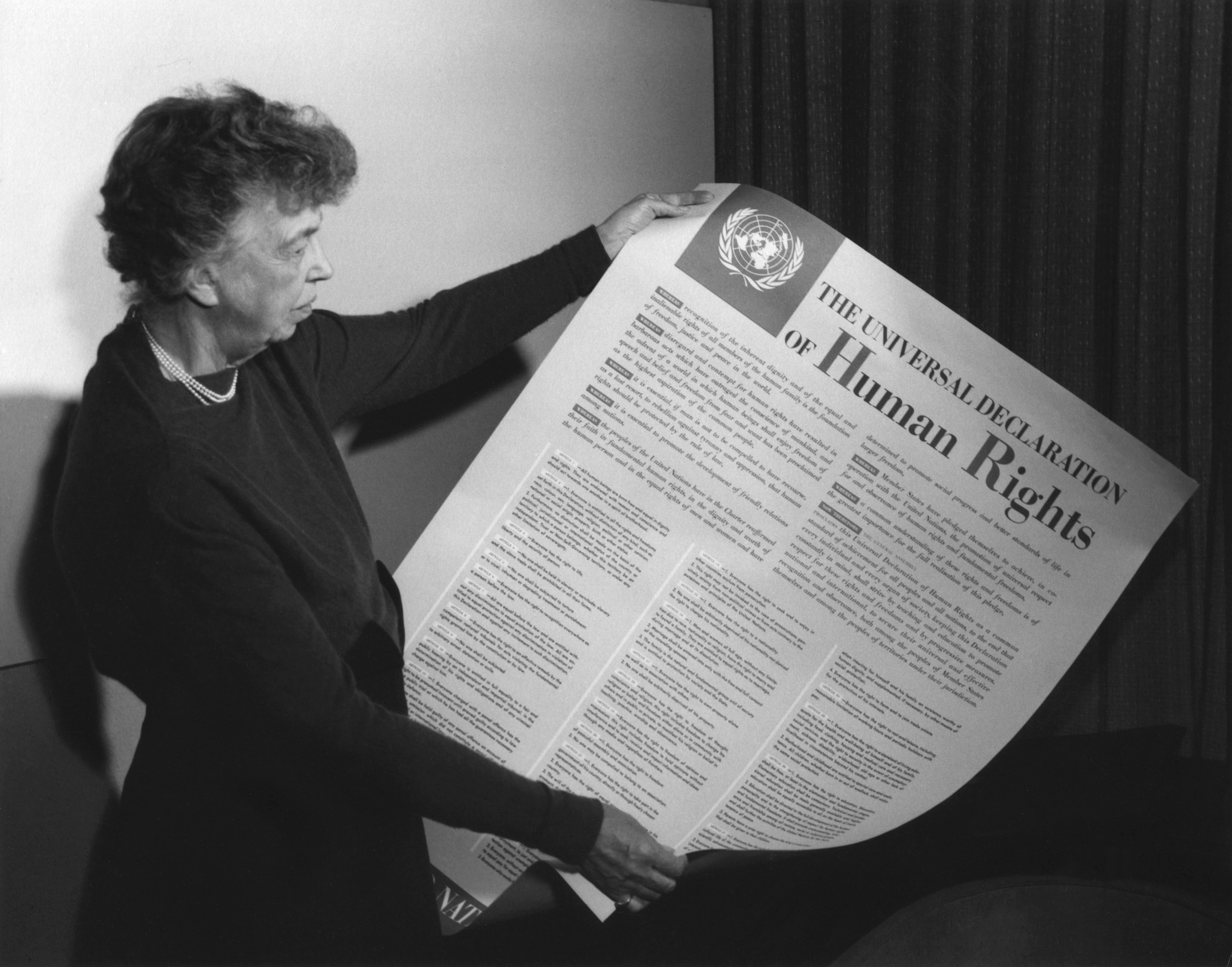
Eleanor Roosevelt believed the Universal Declaration of Human Rights of 1948 "may well become the international Magna Carta of all". Based on the President's call for a Second Bill of Rights in 1944, articles 22–24 elevated rights to "social security", "just and favourable conditions of work", and the "right to rest and leisure" to be as important as the "right to own property".

Contracts between employees and employers (mostly corporations) usually begin an employment relationship, but are often not enough for a decent livelihood. Because individuals lack bargaining power, especially against wealthy corporations, labor law creates legal rights that override arbitrary market outcomes. Historically, the law faithfully enforced property rights and freedom of contract on any terms, whether or not this was inefficient, exploitative and unjust. In the early 20th century, as more people favored the introduction of democratically determined economic and social rights over rights of property and contract, state and federal governments introduced law reform. First, the Fair Labor Standards Act of 1938 created a minimum wage (now $7.25 at federal level, higher in 28 states) and overtime pay of one and a half times. Second, the Family and Medical Leave Act of 1993 creates very limited rights to take unpaid leave. In practice, good employment contracts improve on these minimums. Third, while there is no right to an occupational pension or other benefits, the Employee Retirement Income Security Act of 1974 ensures employers guarantee those benefits if they are promised. Fourth, the Occupational Safety and Health Act 1970 demands a safe system of work, backed by professional inspectors. Individual states are often empowered to go beyond the federal minimum, and function as laboratories of democracy in social and economic rights, where they have not been constrained by the US Supreme Court.

=== Scope of protection ===
Common law, state and federal statutes usually confer labor rights on "employees", but not people who are autonomous and have sufficient bargaining power to be "independent contractors". In 1994, the Dunlop Commission on the Future of Worker-Management Relations: Final Report recommended a unified definition of an employee under all federal labor laws, to reduce litigation, but this was not implemented. As it stands, Supreme Court cases have stated various general principles, which will apply according to the context and purpose of the statute in question. In NLRB v. Hearst Publications, Inc., newsboys who sold newspapers in Los Angeles claimed that they were "employees", so that they had a right to collectively bargain under the National Labor Relations Act of 1935. The newspaper corporations argued the newsboys were "independent contractors", and they were under no duty to bargain in good faith. The Supreme Court held the newsboys were employees, and common law tests of employment, particularly the summary in the Restatement of the Law of Agency, Second §220, were no longer appropriate. They were not "independent contractors" because of the degree of control employers had. But the National Labor Relations Board could decide itself who was covered if it had "a reasonable basis in law." Congress reacted, first, by explicitly amending the NLRA §2(1) so that independent contractors were exempt from the law while, second, disapproving that the common law was irrelevant. At the same time, the Supreme Court decided United States v. Silk, holding that "economic reality" must be taken into account when deciding who is an employee under the Social Security Act of 1935. This meant a group of coal loaders were employees, having regard to their economic position, including their lack of bargaining power, the degree of discretion and control, and the risk they assumed compared to the coal businesses they worked for. By contrast, the Supreme Court found truckers who owned their own trucks, and provided services to a carrier company, were independent contractors. Thus, it is now accepted that multiple factors of traditional common law tests may not be replaced if a statute gives no further definition of "employee" (as is usual, e.g., the Fair Labor Standards Act of 1938, Employee Retirement Income Security Act of 1974, Family and Medical Leave Act of 1993). Alongside the purpose of labor legislation to mitigate inequality of bargaining power and redress the economic reality of a worker's position, the multiple factors found in the Restatement of Agency must be considered, though none is necessarily decisive.

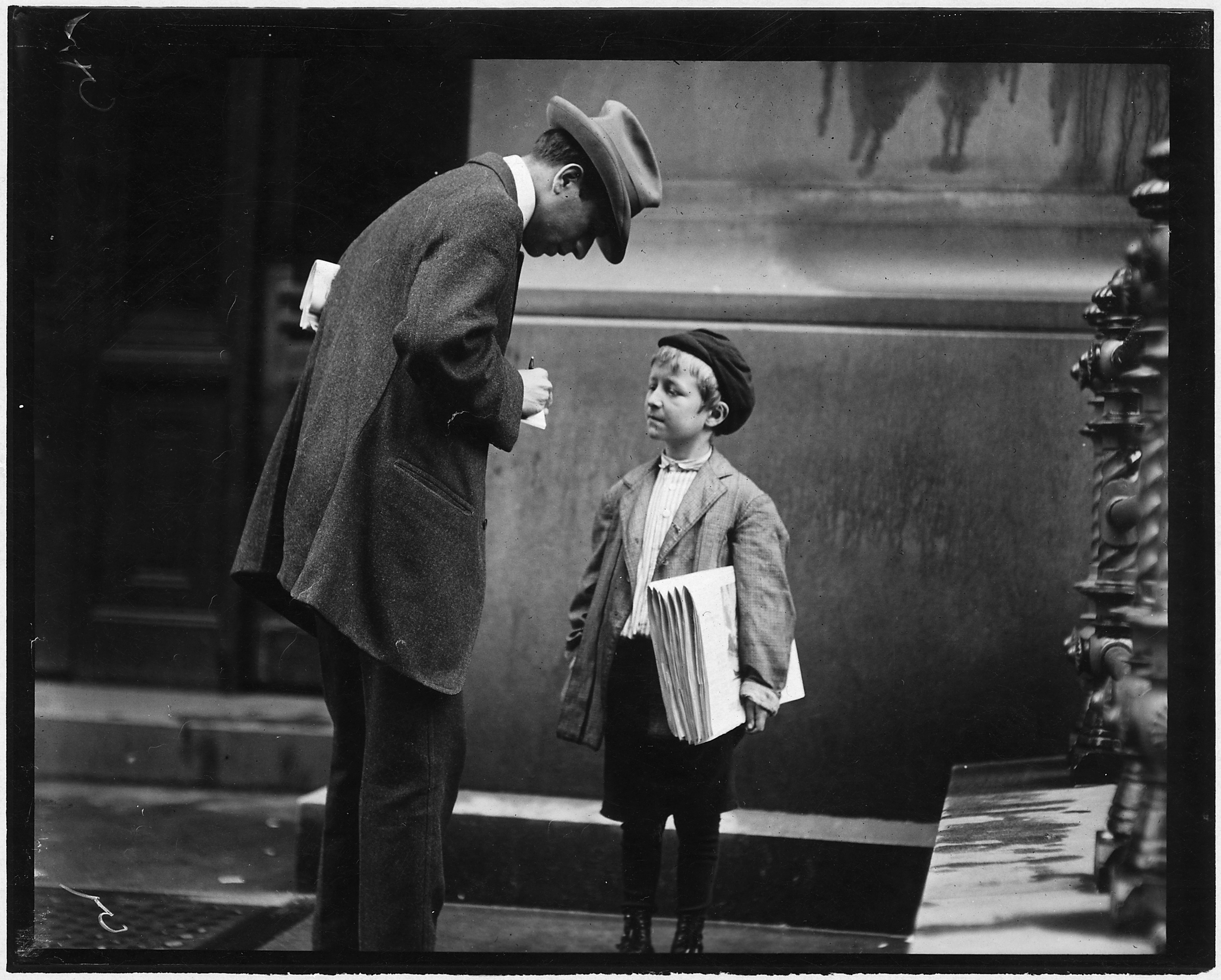
"Newsboys" in L.A. were held in the leading case, NLRB v. Hearst Publications, Inc., to be employees with labor rights, not independent contractors, on account of their unequal bargaining power.

Common law agency tests of who is an "employee" take account of an employer's control, if the employee is in a distinct business, degree of direction, skill, who supplies tools, length of employment, method of payment, the regular business of the employer, what the parties believe, and whether the employer has a business. Some statutes also make specific exclusions that reflect the common law, such as for independent contractors, and others make additional exceptions. In particular, the National Labor Relations Act of 1935 §2(11) exempts supervisors with "authority, in the interest of the employer", to exercise discretion over other employees' jobs and terms. This was originally a narrow exception. Controversially, in NLRB v. Yeshiva University, a 5 to 4 majority of the Supreme Court held that full time professors in a university were excluded from collective bargaining rights, on the theory that they exercised "managerial" discretion in academic matters. The dissenting judges pointed out that management was actually in the hands of university administration, not professors. In NLRB v. Kentucky River Community Care, Inc., the Supreme Court held, again 5 to 4, that six registered nurses who exercised supervisory status over others fell into the "professional" exemption. Stevens J, for the dissent, argued that if "the 'supervisor' is construed too broadly", without regard to the Act's purpose, protection "is effectively nullified". Similarly, under the Fair Labor Standards Act of 1938, in Christopher v. SmithKline Beecham Corp., the Supreme Court held 5 to 4 that a traveling medical salesman for GSK of four years was an "outside salesman", and so could not claim overtime. People working unlawfully are often regarded as covered, so as not to encourage employers to exploit vulnerable employees. For instance in Lemmerman v. A.T. Williams Oil Co., under the North Carolina Workers' Compensation Act an eight-year-old boy was protected as an employee, even though children working under the age of 8 was unlawful. However, in Hoffman Plastic Compounds, Inc. v. NLRB, the Supreme Court held 5 to 4 that an undocumented worker could not claim back pay, after being discharged for organizing in a union. The gradual withdrawal of more and more people from the scope of labor law, by a slim majority of the Supreme Court since 1976, means that the US falls below international law standards, and standards in other democratic countries, on core labor rights, including freedom of association.

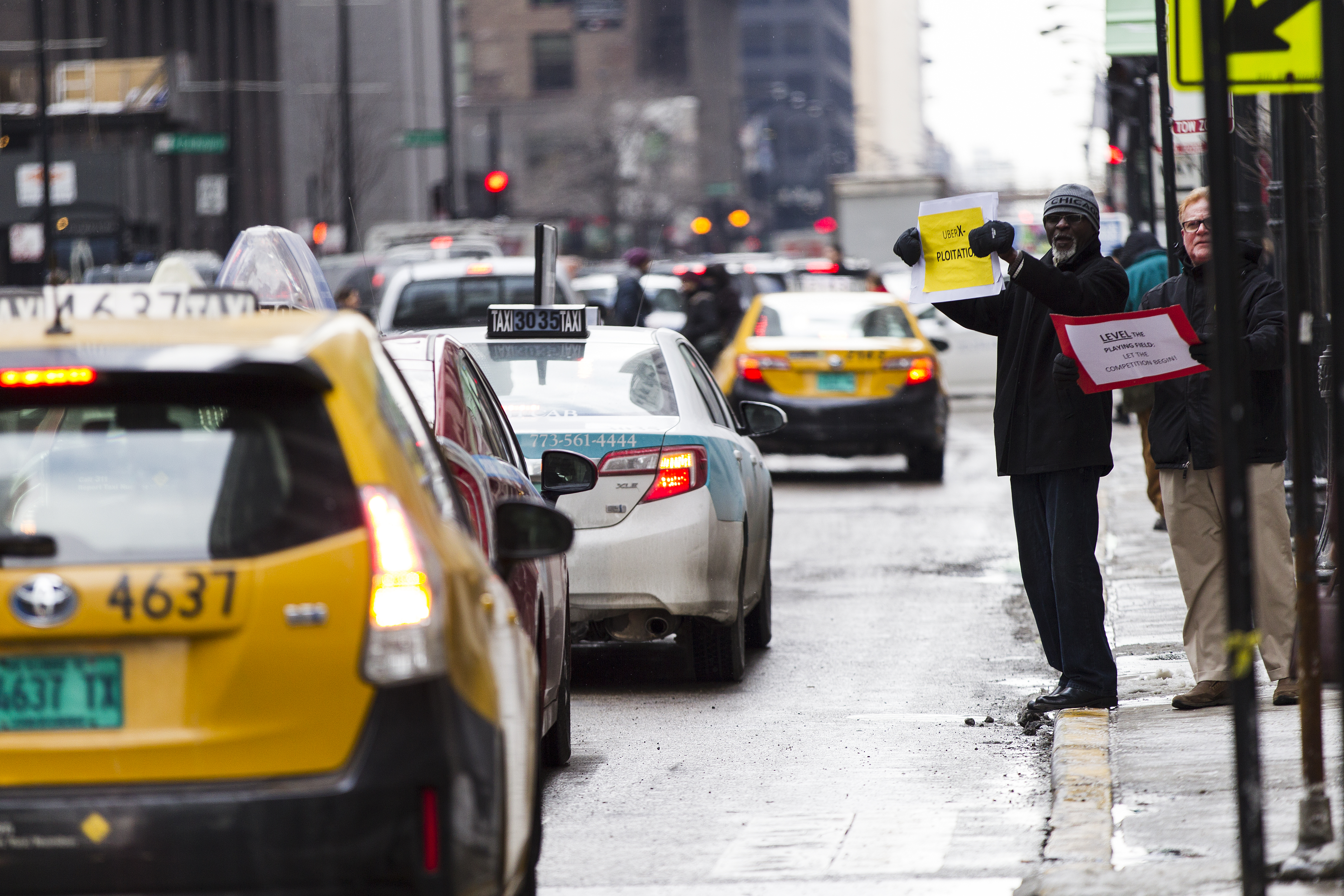
In September 2015, the California Labor and Workforce Development Agency held that Uber drivers are controlled and sanctioned by the company and are therefore not self-employed.

Common law tests were often important for determining who was, not just an employee, but the relevant employers who had "vicarious liability". Potentially there can be multiple, joint-employers could who share responsibility, although responsibility in tort law can exist regardless of an employment relationship. In Ruiz v. Shell Oil Co, the Fifth Circuit held that it was relevant which employer had more control, whose work was being performed, whether there were agreements in place, who provided tools, had a right to discharge the employee, or had the obligation to pay. In Local 217, Hotel & Restaurant Employees Union v. MHM Inc the question arose under the Worker Adjustment and Retraining Notification Act of 1988 whether a subsidiary or parent corporation was responsible to notify employees that the hotel would close. The Second Circuit held the subsidiary was the employer, although the trial court had found the parent responsible while noting the subsidiary would be the employer under the NLRA. Under the Fair Labor Standards Act of 1938, 29 USC §203(r), any "enterprise" that is under common control will count as the employing entity. Other statutes do not explicitly adopt this approach, although the NLRB has found an enterprise to be an employer if it has "substantially identical management, business purpose, operation, equipment, customers and supervision." In South Prairie Const. Co. v. Local No. 627, International Union of Operating Engineers, AFL-CIO, the Supreme Court found that the DC Circuit had legitimately identified two corporations as a single employer given that they had a "very substantial qualitative degree of centralized control of labor", but that further determination of the relevant bargaining unit should have been remitted to the NLRB. When employees are hired through an agency, it is likely that the end-employer will be considered responsible for statutory rights in most cases, although the agency may be regarded as a joint employer.

=== Contracts of employment ===
When people start work, there will almost always be a contract of employment that governs the relationship of employee and the employing entity (usually a corporation, but occasionally a human being). A "contract" is an agreement enforceable in law. Very often it can be written down, or signed, but an oral agreement is also a fully enforceable contract. Because employees have unequal bargaining power compared to almost all employing entities, most employment contracts are "standard form". Most terms and conditions are photocopied or reproduced for many people. Genuine negotiation is rare, unlike in commercial transactions between two business corporations. This has been the main justification for enactment of rights in federal and state law. The federal right to collective bargaining, by a labor union elected by its employees, is meant to reduce the inherently unequal bargaining power of individuals against organizations to make collective agreements. The federal right to a minimum wage, and increased overtime pay for working over 40 hours a week, was designed to ensure a "minimum standard of living necessary for health, efficiency, and general well-being of workers", even when a person could not get a high enough wage by individual bargaining. These and other rights, including family leave, rights against discrimination, or basic job security standards, were designed by the United States Congress and state legislatures to replace individual contract provisions. Statutory rights override even an express written term of a contract, usually unless the contract is more beneficial to an employee. Some federal statutes also envisage that state law rights can improve upon minimum rights. For example, the Fair Labor Standards Act of 1938 entitles states and municipalities to set minimum wages beyond the federal minimum. By contrast, other statutes such as the National Labor Relations Act of 1935, the Occupational Safety and Health Act of 1970, and the Employee Retirement Income Security Act of 1974, have been interpreted in a series of contentious judgments by the US Supreme Court to "preempt" state law enactments. These interpretations have had the effect to "stay experimentation in things social and economic" and stop states wanting to "serve as a laboratory" by improving labor rights. Where minimum rights do not exist in federal or state statutes, principles of contract law, and potentially torts, will apply.

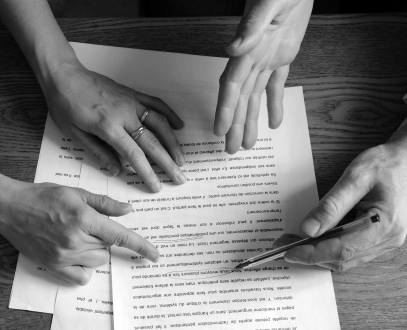
Employment contracts are subject to minimum rights in state and federal statute, and those created by collective agreements.

Aside from terms in oral or written agreements, terms can be incorporated by reference. Two main sources are collective agreements and company handbooks. In JI Case Co v. National Labor Relations Board an employing corporation argued it should not have to bargain in good faith with a labor union, and did not commit an unfair labor practice by refusing, because it had recently signed individual contracts with its employees. The US Supreme Court held unanimously that the "very purpose" of collective bargaining and the National Labor Relations Act 1935 was "to supersede the terms of separate agreements of employees with terms which reflect the strength and bargaining power and serve the welfare of the group". Terms of collective agreements, to the advantage of individual employees, therefore supersede individual contracts. Similarly, if a written contract states that employees do not have rights, but an employee has been told they do by a supervisor, or rights are assured in a company handbook, they will usually have a claim. For example, in Torosyan v. Boehringer Ingelheim Pharmaceuticals, Inc. the Supreme Court of Connecticut held that a promise in a handbook that an employee could be dismissed only for a good reason (or "just cause") was binding on the employing corporation. Furthermore, an employer had no right to unilaterally change the terms. Most other state courts have reached the same conclusion, that contracts cannot be altered, except for employees' benefit, without new consideration and true agreement. By contrast, a slight majority on the California Supreme Court, appointed by Republican governors, held in Asmus v. Pacific Bell that a company policy of indefinite duration can be altered after a reasonable time with reasonable notice, if it affects no vested benefits. The four dissenting judges, appointed by Democratic governors, held this was a "patently unfair, indeed unconscionable, result—permitting an employer that made a promise of continuing job security ... to repudiate that promise with impunity several years later". In addition, a basic term of good faith which cannot be waived, is implied by common law or equity in all states. This usually demands, as a general principle that "neither party shall do anything, which will have the effect of destroying or injuring the right of the other party, to receive the fruits of the contract". The term of good faith persists throughout the employment relationship. It has not yet been used extensively by state courts, compared to other jurisdictions. The Montana Supreme Court has recognized that extensive and even punitive damages could be available for breach of an employee's reasonable expectations. However others, such as the California Supreme Court limit any recovery of damages to contract breaches, but not damages regarding the manner of termination. By contrast, in the United Kingdom the requirement for "good faith" has been found to limit the power of discharge except for fair reasons (but not to conflict with statute), in Canada it may limit unjust discharge also for self-employed persons, and in Germany it can preclude the payment of wages significantly below average.

Finally, it was traditionally thought that arbitration clauses could not displace any employment rights, and therefore limit access to justice in public courts. However, in 14 Penn Plaza LLC v. Pyett, in a 5 to 4 decision under the Federal Arbitration Act of 1925, individual employment contract arbitration clauses are to be enforced according to their terms. The four dissenting judges argued that this would eliminate rights in a way that the law never intended.

=== Wages and pay ===
While contracts often determine wages and terms of employment, the law refuses to enforce contracts that do not observe basic standards of fairness for employees. Today, the Fair Labor Standards Act of 1938 aims to create a national minimum wage, and a voice at work, especially through collective bargaining should achieve fair wages. A growing body of law also regulates executive pay, although a system of "maximum wage" regulation, for instance by the former Stabilization Act of 1942, is not currently in force. Historically, the law actually suppressed wages, not of the highly paid, by ordinary workers. For example, in 1641 the Massachusetts Bay Colony legislature (dominated by property owners and the official church) required wage reductions, and said rising wages "tende to the ruin of the Churches and the Commonwealth". In the early 20th century, democratic opinion demanded everyone had a minimum wage, and could bargain for fair wages beyond the minimum. But when states tried to introduce new laws, the US Supreme Court held them unconstitutional. A right to freedom of contract, argued a majority, could be construed from the Fifth and Fourteenth Amendment's protection against being deprived "of life, liberty, or property, without due process of law". Dissenting judges argued that "due process" did not affect the legislative power to create social or economic rights, because employees "are not upon a full level of equality of choice with their employer".

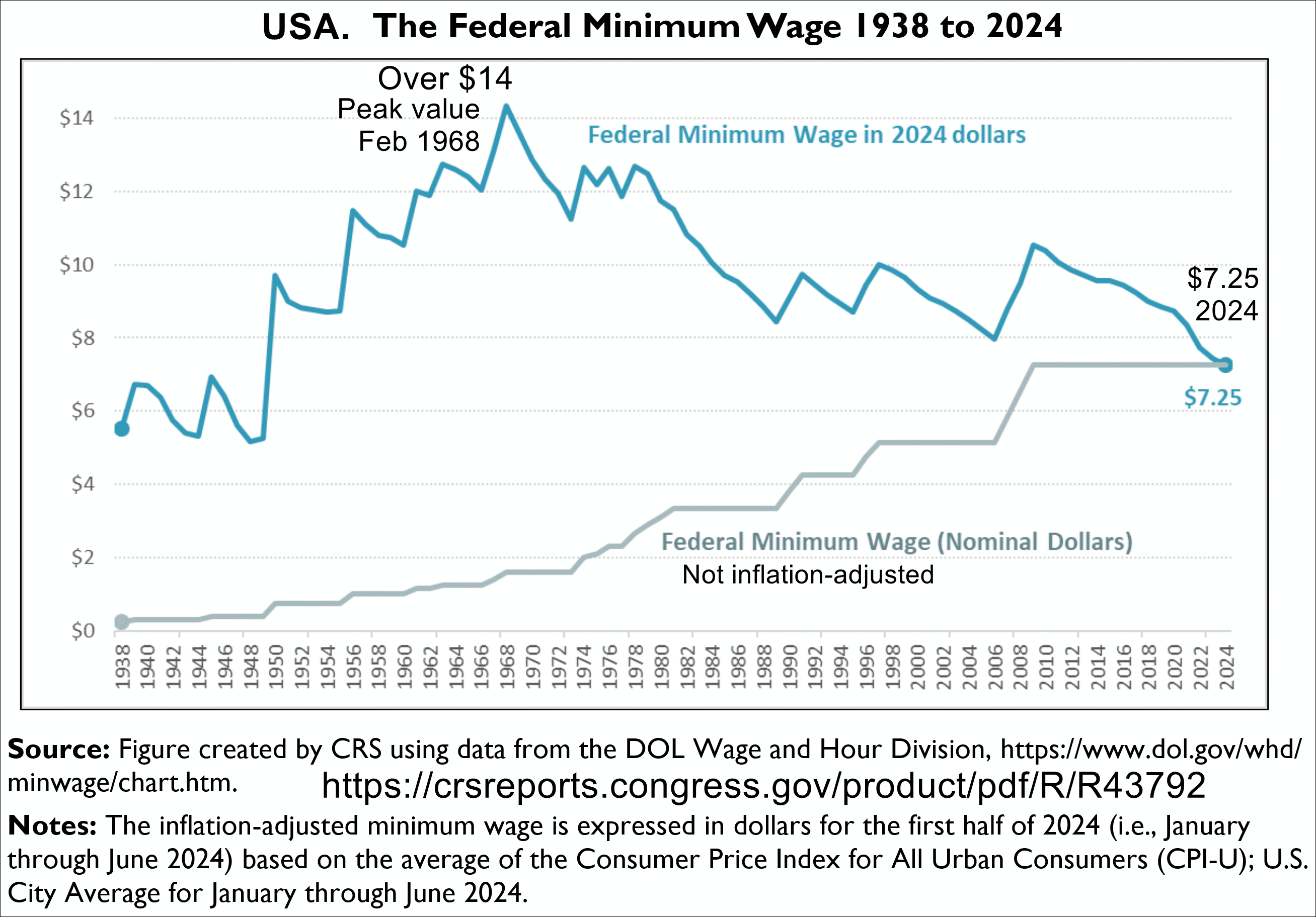
The real federal minimum wage has declined by 46% since February 1968. Lower line is nominal dollars. Top line is inflation-adjusted.

After the Wall Street Crash, and the New Deal with the election of Franklin D. Roosevelt, the majority in the US Supreme Court was changed. In West Coast Hotel Co. v. Parrish Hughes CJ held (over four dissenters still arguing for Freedom of Contract) that a Washington law setting minimum wages for women was constitutional because the state legislatures should be enabled to adopt legislation in the public interest. This ended the "Lochner era", and Congress enacted the Fair Labor Standards Act of 1938. Under §202(a) the federal minimum wage aims to ensure a "standard of living necessary for health, efficiency and general well being". Under §207(a)(1), most employees (but with many exceptions) working over 40 hours a week must receive 50 per cent more overtime pay on their hourly wage. Nobody may pay lower than the minimum wage, but under §218(a) states and municipal governments may enact higher wages. This is frequently done to reflect local productivity and requirements for decent living in each region. However the federal minimum wage has no automatic mechanism to update with inflation. Because the Republican Party has opposed raising wages, the federal real minimum wage is over 33 per cent lower today than in 1968, among the lowest in the industrialized world.

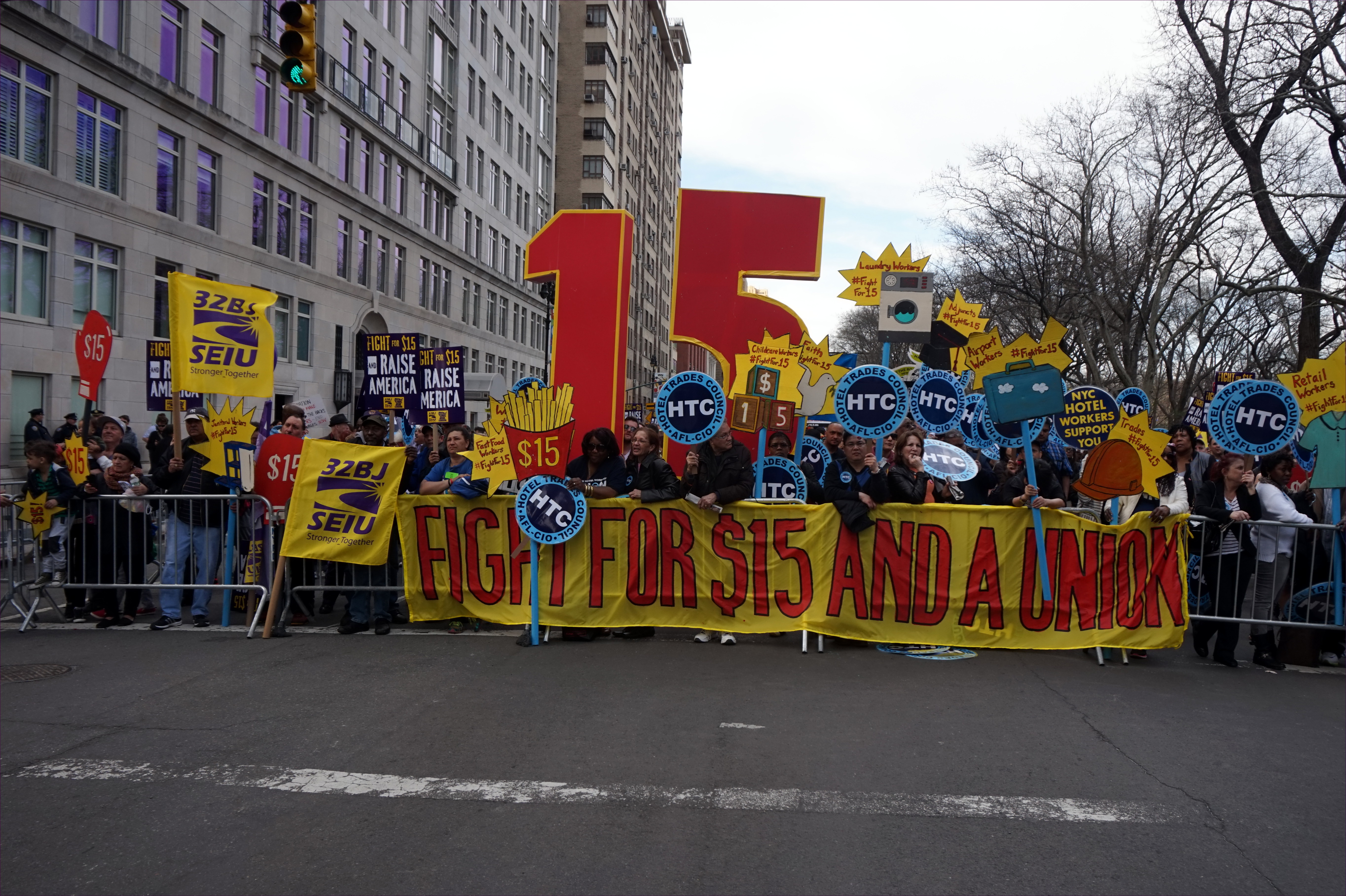
People have campaigned for a $15 an hour minimum wage, because the real minimum wage has fallen by 43% compared to 1968. In "tipped" jobs, some states still enable employers to take their workers' tips for between $2.13 and the $7.25 minimum wage per hour.

Although there is a federal minimum wage, it has been restricted in (1) the scope of who it covers, (2) the time that counts to calculate the hourly minimum wage, and (3) the amount that employers' can take from their employees' tips or deduct for expenses. First, five US Supreme Court judges held in Alden v. Maine that the federal minimum wage cannot be enforced for employees of state governments, unless the state has consented, because that would violate the Eleventh Amendment. Souter J, joined by three dissenting justices, held that no such "sovereign immunity" existed in the Eleventh Amendment. Twenty-eight states, however, did have minimum wage laws higher than the federal level in 2016. Further, because the US Constitution, article one, section 8, clause 3 only allows the federal government to "regulate Commerce ... among the several States", employees of any "enterprise" under $500,000 making goods or services that do not enter commerce are not covered: they must rely on state minimum wage laws. FLSA 1938 §203(s) explicitly exempts establishments whose only employees are close family members. Under §213 the minimum wage may not be paid to 18 categories of employee, and paying overtime to 30 categories of employee. This include under §213(a)(1) employees of "bona fide executive, administrative, or professional capacity". In Auer v. Robbins police sergeants and lieutenants at the St Louis Police Department, Missouri claimed they should not be classed as executives or professional employees, and should get overtime pay. Scalia J held that, following Department of Labor guidance, the St Louis police commissioners were entitled to exempt them. This has encouraged employers to attempt to define staff as more "senior" and make them work longer hours while avoiding overtime pay. Another exemption in §213(a)(15) is for people "employed in domestic service employment to provide companionship services". In Long Island Care at Home, Ltd. v. Coke, a corporation claimed exemption, although Breyer J for a unanimous court agreed with the Department of Labor that it was only intended for carers in private homes.

Second, because §206(a)(1)(C) says the minimum wage is $7.25 per hour, courts have grappled with which hours count as "working". Early cases established that time traveling to work did not count as work, unless it was controlled by, required by, and for the benefit of an employer, like traveling through a coal mine. For example, in, Anderson v. Mt. Clemens Pottery Co. a majority of five to two justices held that employees had to be paid for the long walk to work through an employer's Mount Clemens Pottery Co facility. According to Murphy J this time, and time setting up workstations, involved "exertion of a physical nature, controlled or required by the employer and pursued necessarily and primarily for the employer's benefit." In Armour & Co. v. Wantock firefighters claimed they should be fully paid while on call at their station for fires. The Supreme Court held that, even though the firefighters could sleep or play cards, because "[r]eadiness to serve may be hired quite as much as service itself" and time waiting on call was "a benefit to the employer". By contrast, in 1992 the Sixth Circuit controversially held that needing to be infrequently available by phone or pager, where movement was not restricted, was not working time. Time spent doing unusual cleaning, for instance showering off toxic substances, does count as working time, and so does time putting on special protective gear. Under §207(e) pay for overtime should be one and a half times the regular pay. In Walling v. Helmerich & Payne, Inc., the Supreme Court held that an employer's scheme of paying lower wages in the morning, and higher wages in the afternoon, to argue that overtime only needed to be calculated on top of (lower) morning wages was unlawful. Overtime has to be calculated based on the average regular pay. However, in Christensen v. Harris County six Supreme Court judges held that police in Harris County, Texas, could be forced to use up their accumulated "compensatory time" (allowing time off with full pay) before claiming overtime. Writing for the dissent, Stevens J said the majority had misconstrued §207(o)(2), which requires an "agreement" between employers, unions or employees on the applicable rules, and the Texas police had not agreed. Third, §203(m) allows employers to deduct sums from wages for food or housing that is "customarily furnished" for employees. The secretary of labor may determine what counts as fair value. Most problematically, outside states that have banned the practice, they may deduct money from a "tipped employee" for money over the "cash wage required to be paid such an employee on August 20, 1996"—and this was $2.13 per hour. If an employee does not earn enough in tips, the employer must still pay the $7.25 minimum wage. But this means in many states tips do not go to workers: tips are taken by employers to subsidize low pay. Under FLSA 1938 §216(b)-(c) the secretary of state can enforce the law, or individuals can claim on their own behalf. Federal enforcement is rare, so most employees are successful if they are in a labor union. The Consumer Credit Protection Act of 1968 limits deductions or "garnishments" by employers to 25 per cent of wages, though many states are considerably more protective. Finally, under the Portal to Portal Act of 1947, where Congress limited the minimum wage laws in a range of ways, §254 puts a two-year time limit on enforcing claims, or three years if an employing entity is guilty of a willful violation.

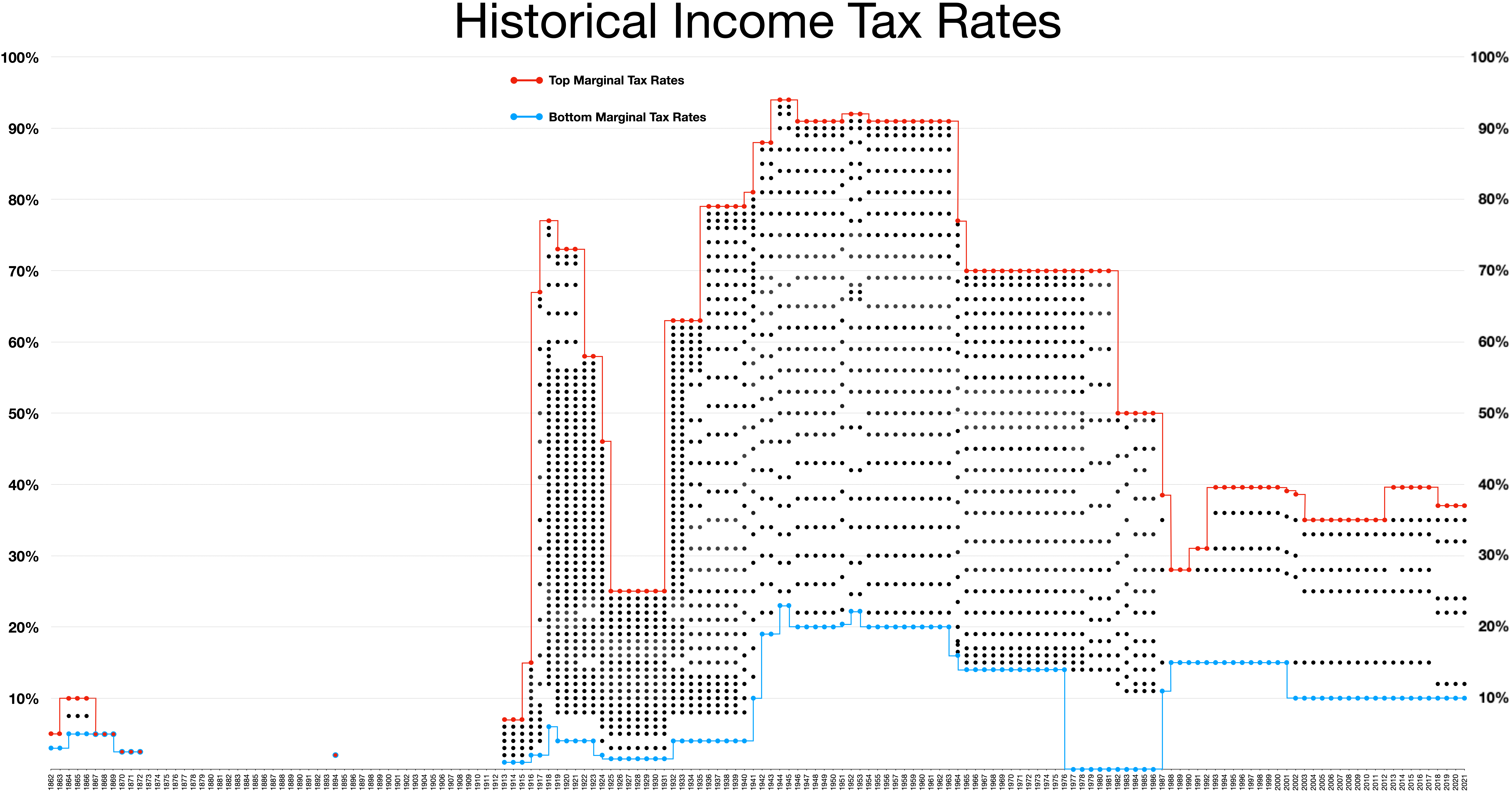
Top marginal income tax rates: Tax brackets; Lowest marginal income tax rates

- Income tax in the United States
- Legal history of income tax in the United States
- State income tax
- Payroll tax, Federal Insurance Contributions Act tax

=== Working time and family care ===
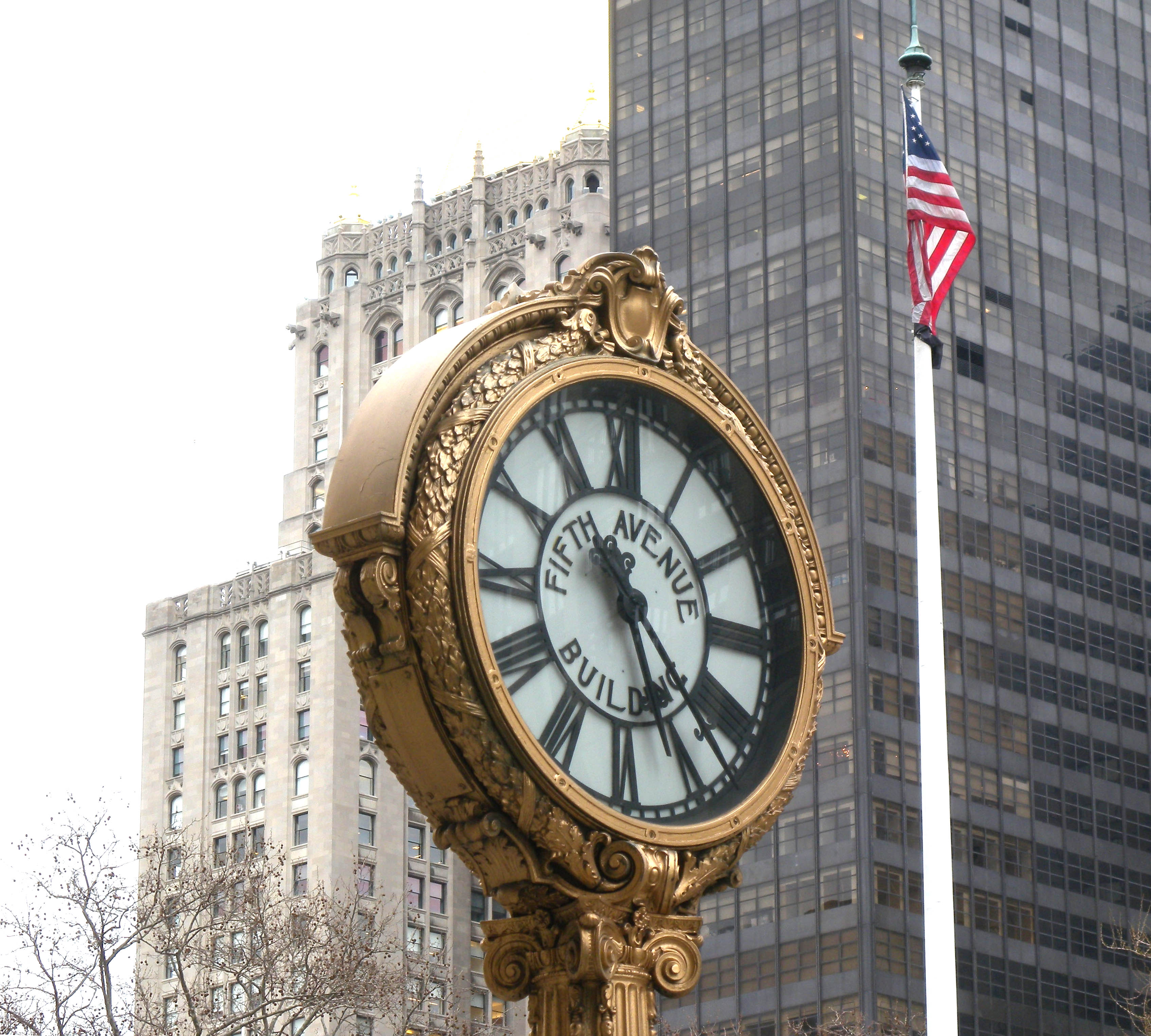
The Universal Declaration of Human Rights of 1948 article 23 requires "reasonable limitation of working hours and periodic holidays with pay", but there is no federal or state right to paid annual leave: Americans have the least in the developed world.

People in the United States work among the longest hours per week in the industrialized world, and have the least annual leave. The Universal Declaration of Human Rights of 1948 article 24 states: "Everyone has the right to rest and leisure, including reasonable limitation of working hours and periodic holidays with pay." However, there is no general federal or state legislation requiring paid annual leave. Title 5 of the United States Code §6103 specifies ten public holidays for federal government employees, and provides that holidays will be paid. Many states do the same, however, no state law requires private sector employers to provide paid holidays. Many private employers follow the norms of federal and state government, but the right to annual leave, if any, will depend upon collective agreements and individual employment contracts. State law proposals have been made to introduce paid annual leave. A 2014 Washington Bill from United States House of Representatives member Gael Tarleton would have required a minimum of 3 weeks of paid holidays each year to employees in businesses of over 20 staff, after 3 years work. Under the International Labour Organization Holidays with Pay Convention 1970 three weeks is the bare minimum. The bill did not receive enough votes. By contrast, employees in all European Union countries have the right to at least 4 weeks (i.e. 28 days) of paid annual leave each year. Furthermore, there is no federal or state law on limits to the length of the working week. Instead, the Fair Labor Standards Act of 1938 §207 creates a financial disincentive to longer working hours. Under the heading "Maximum hours", §207 states that time and a half pay must be given to employees working more than 40 hours in a week. It does not, however, set an actual limit, and there are at least 30 exceptions for categories of employee which do not receive overtime pay. Shorter working time was one of the labor movement's original demands. From the first decades of the 20th century, collective bargaining produced the practice of having, and the word for, a two-day "weekend". State legislation to limit working time was, however, suppressed by the US Supreme Court in Lochner v. New York. The New York State Legislature had passed the Bakeshop Act of 1895, which limited work in bakeries to 10 hours a day or 60 hours a week, to improve health, safety and people's living conditions. After being prosecuted for making his staff work longer in his Utica, Mr Lochner claimed that the law violated the Fourteenth Amendment on "due process". Despite the dissent of four judges, a majority of five judges held that the law was unconstitutional. The Supreme Court, however, did uphold Utah's mine workday statute in 1898. The Mississippi State Supreme Court upheld a ten hour workday statute in 1912 when it ruled against the due process arguments of an interstate lumber company. The whole Lochner era of jurisprudence was reversed by the US Supreme Court in 1937, but experimentation to improve working time rights, and "work-life balance" has not yet recovered.

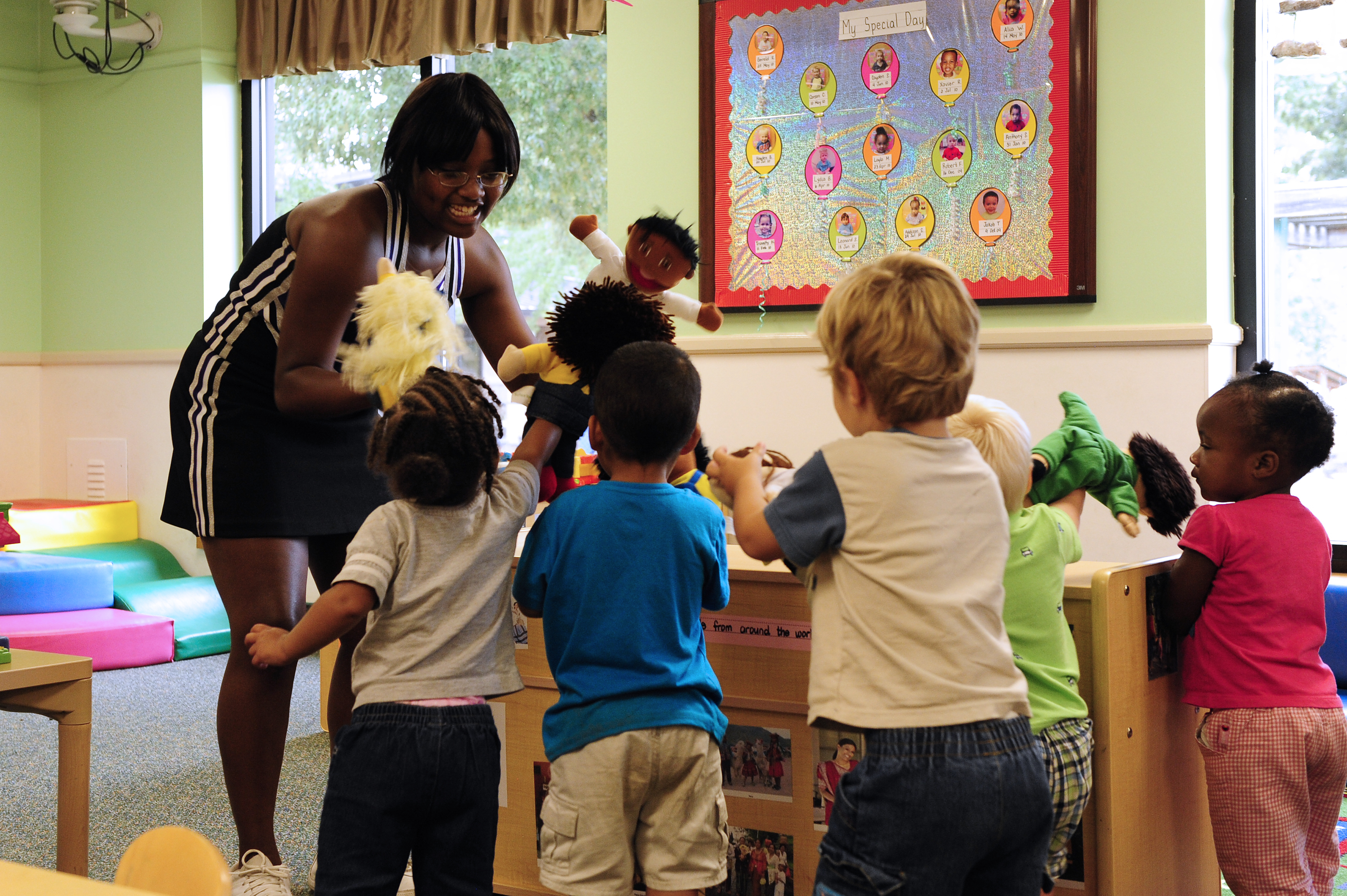
Because there is no right to education and child care for children under five, the costs of child care fall on parents. But in 2016, four states had legislated for paid family leave.

Just as there are no rights to paid annual leave or maximum hours, there are no rights to paid time off for child care or family leave in federal law. There are minimal rights in some states. Most collective agreements, and many individual contracts, provide paid time off, but employees who lack bargaining power will often get none. There are, however, limited federal rights to unpaid leave for family and medical reasons. The Family and Medical Leave Act of 1993 generally applies to employers of 50 or more employees in 20 weeks of the last year, and gives rights to employees who have worked over 12 months and 1250 hours in the last year. Employees can have up to 12 weeks of unpaid leave for child birth, adoption, to care for a close relative in poor health, or because of an employee's own poor health. Child care leave should be taken in one lump, unless agreed otherwise. Employees must give notice of 30 days to employers if birth or adoption is "foreseeable", and for serious health conditions if practicable. Treatments should be arranged "so as not to disrupt unduly the operations of the employer" according to medical advice. Employers must provide benefits during the unpaid leave. Under §2652(b) states are empowered to provide "greater family or medical leave rights". In 2016 California, New Jersey, Rhode Island and New York had laws for paid family leave rights. Under §2612(2)(A) an employer can make an employee substitute the right to 12 unpaid weeks of leave for "accrued paid vacation leave, personal leave or family leave" in an employer's personnel policy. Originally the Department of Labor had a penalty to make employers notify employees that this might happen. However, five judges in the US Supreme Court in Ragsdale v. Wolverine World Wide, Inc. held that the statute precluded the right of the Department of Labor to do so. Four dissenting judges would have held that nothing prevented the rule, and it was the Department of Labor's job to enforce the law. After unpaid leave, an employee generally has the right to return to his or her job, except for employees who are in the top 10% of highest paid and the employer can argue refusal "is necessary to prevent substantial and grievous economic injury to the operations of the employer." Employees or the secretary of labor can bring enforcement actions, but there is no right to a jury for reinstatement claims. Employees can seek damages for lost wages and benefits, or the cost of child care, plus an equal amount of liquidated damages unless an employer can show it acted in good faith and reasonable cause to believe it was not breaking the law. There is a two-year limit on bringing claims, or three years for willful violations. Despite the lack of rights to leave, there is no right to free child care or day care. This has encouraged several proposals to create a public system of free child care, or for the government to subsize parents' costs.

=== Pensions ===
In the early 20th century, the possibility of having a "retirement" became real as people lived longer, and believed the elderly should not have to work or rely on charity until they died. The law maintains an income in retirement in three ways (1) through a public social security program created by the Social Security Act of 1935, (2) occupational pensions managed through the employment relationship, and (3) private pensions or life insurance that individuals buy themselves. At work, most occupational pension schemes originally resulted from collective bargaining during the 1920s and 1930s. Unions usually bargained for employers across a sector to pool funds, so that employees could keep their pensions if they moved jobs. Multi-employer retirement plans, set up by collective agreement became known as "Taft–Hartley plans" after the Taft–Hartley Act of 1947 required joint management of funds by employees and employers. Many employers also voluntarily choose to provide pensions. For example, the pension for professors, now called TIAA, was established on the initiative of Andrew Carnegie in 1918 with the express requirement for participants to have voting rights for the plan trustees. These could be collective and defined benefit schemes: a percentage of one's income (e.g. 67%) is replaced for retirement, however long the person lives. But more recently more employers have only provided individual "401(k)" plans. These are named after the Internal Revenue Code §401(k), which allows employers and employees to pay no tax on money that is saved in the fund, until an employee retires. The same tax deferral rule applies to all pensions. But unlike a "defined benefit" plan, a 401(k) only contains whatever the employer and employee contribute. It will run out if a person lives too long, meaning the retiree may only have minimum social security. The Pension Protection Act of 2006 §902 codified a model for employers to automatically enroll their employees in a pension, with a right to opt out. However, there is no right to an occupational pension. The Employee Retirement Income Security Act of 1974 does create a series of rights for employees if one is set up. It also applies to health care or any other "employee benefit" plan.

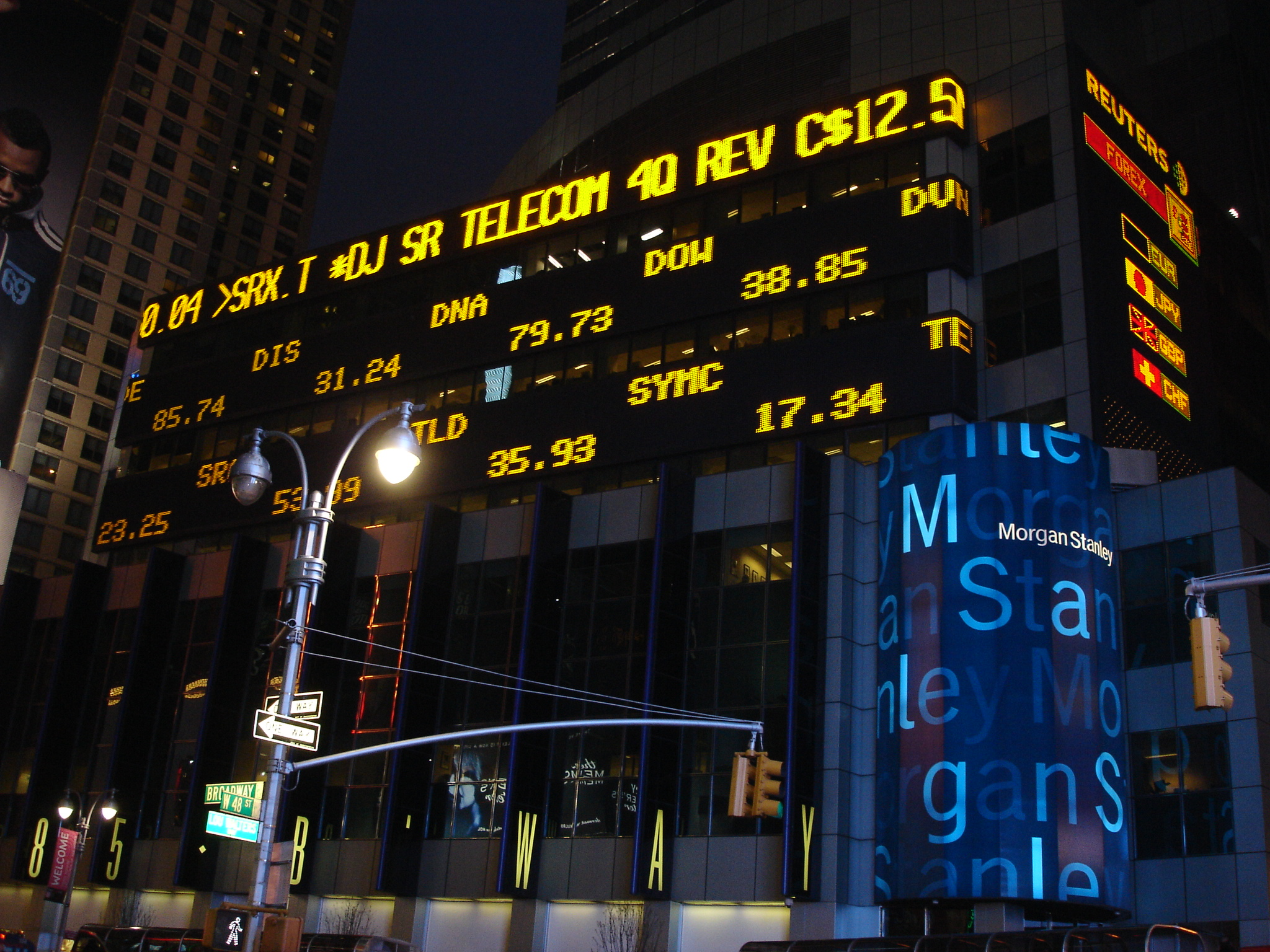
Investment managers, like Morgan Stanley and all pension trustees, are fiduciaries. This means they must avoid conflicts of interest. During a takeover bid, Donovan v. Bierwirth held trustees must take advice or not vote on corporate stocks if in doubt about conflicts.

Five main rights for beneficiaries in ERISA 1974 include information, funding, vesting, anti-discrimination, and fiduciary duties. First, each beneficiary should receive a "summary plan description" in 90 days of joining, plans must file annual reports with the secretary of labor, and if beneficiaries make claims any refusal must be justified with a "full and fair review". If the "summary plan description" is more beneficial than the actual plan documents, because the pension fund makes a mistake, a beneficiary may enforce the terms of either. If an employer has pension or other plans, all employees must be entitled to participate after at longest 12 months, if working over 1000 hours. Second, all promises must be funded in advance. The Pension Benefit Guaranty Corporation was established by the federal government to be an insurer of last resort, but only up to $60,136 per year for each employer. Third, employees' benefits usually cannot be taken away (they "vest") after 5 years, and contributions must accrue (i.e. the employee owns contributions) at a proportionate rate. If employers and pension funds merge, there can be no reduction in benefits, and if an employee goes bankrupt their creditors cannot take their occupational pension. However, the US Supreme Court has enabled benefits to be withdrawn by employers simply amending plans. In Lockheed Corp. v. Spink a majority of seven judges held that an employer could alter a plan, to deprive a 61-year-old man of full benefits when he was reemployed, unbound by fiduciary duties to preserve what an employee had originally been promised. In dissent, Breyer J and Souter J reserved any view on such "highly technical, important matters". Steps to terminate a plan depend on whether it is individual, or multi-employer, and Mead Corp. v. Tilley a majority of the US Supreme Court held that employers could recoup excess benefits paid into pension plans after PBGC conditions are fulfilled. Stevens J, dissenting, contended that all contingent and future liabilities must be satisfied. Fourth, as a general principle, employees or beneficiaries cannot suffer any discrimination or detriment for "the attainment of any right" under a plan. Fifth, managers are bound by responsibilities of competence and loyalty, called "fiduciary duties". Under §1102, a fiduciary is anyone who administers a plan, its trustees, and investment managers who are delegated control. Under §1104, fiduciaries must follow a "prudent" person standard, involving three main components. First, a fiduciary must act "in accordance with the documents and instruments governing the plan". Second, they must act with "care, skill and diligence", including "diversifying the investments of the plan" to "minimize the risk of large losses". Liability for carelessness extends to making misleading statements about benefits, and have been interpreted by the Department of Labor to involve a duty to vote on proxies when corporate stocks are purchased, and publicizing a statement of investment policy. Third, and codifying fundamental equitable principles, a fiduciary must avoid any possibility of a conflict of interest. Fiduciaries must act "solely in the interest of the participants ... for the exclusive purpose of providing benefits" with "reasonable expenses", and specifically avoiding self-dealing with a related "party in interest". For example, in Donovan v. Bierwirth, the Second Circuit held that trustees of a pension which owned shares in the employees' company as a takeover bid was launched, because they faced a potential conflict of interest, had to get independent legal advice on how to vote, or possibly abstain. Remedies for these duties have, however, been restricted by the Supreme Court to disfavor damages. In these fields, according to §1144, ERISA 1974 will "supersede any and all State laws insofar as they may now or hereafter relate to any employee benefit plan". ERISA did not, therefore, follow the model of the Fair Labor Standards Act of 1938 or the Family and Medical Leave Act of 1993, which encourage states to legislate for improved protection for employees, beyond the minimum. The preemption rule led the US Supreme Court to strike down a New York that required giving benefits to pregnant employees in ERISA plans. It held a case under Texas law for damages for denying vesting of benefits was preempted, so the claimant only had ERISA remedies. It struck down a Washington law which altered who would receive life insurance designation on death. However, under §1144(b)(2)(A) this does not affect 'any law of any State which regulates insurance, banking, or securities.' So, the Supreme Court has also held valid a Massachusetts law requiring mental health to be covered by employer group health policies. But it struck down a Pennsylvania statute which prohibited employers becoming subrogated to (potentially more valuable) claims of employees for insurance after accidents. Yet more recently, the court has shown a greater willingness to prevent laws being preempted, however the courts have not yet adopted the principle that state law is not preempted or "superseded" if it is more protective to employees than a federal minimum.

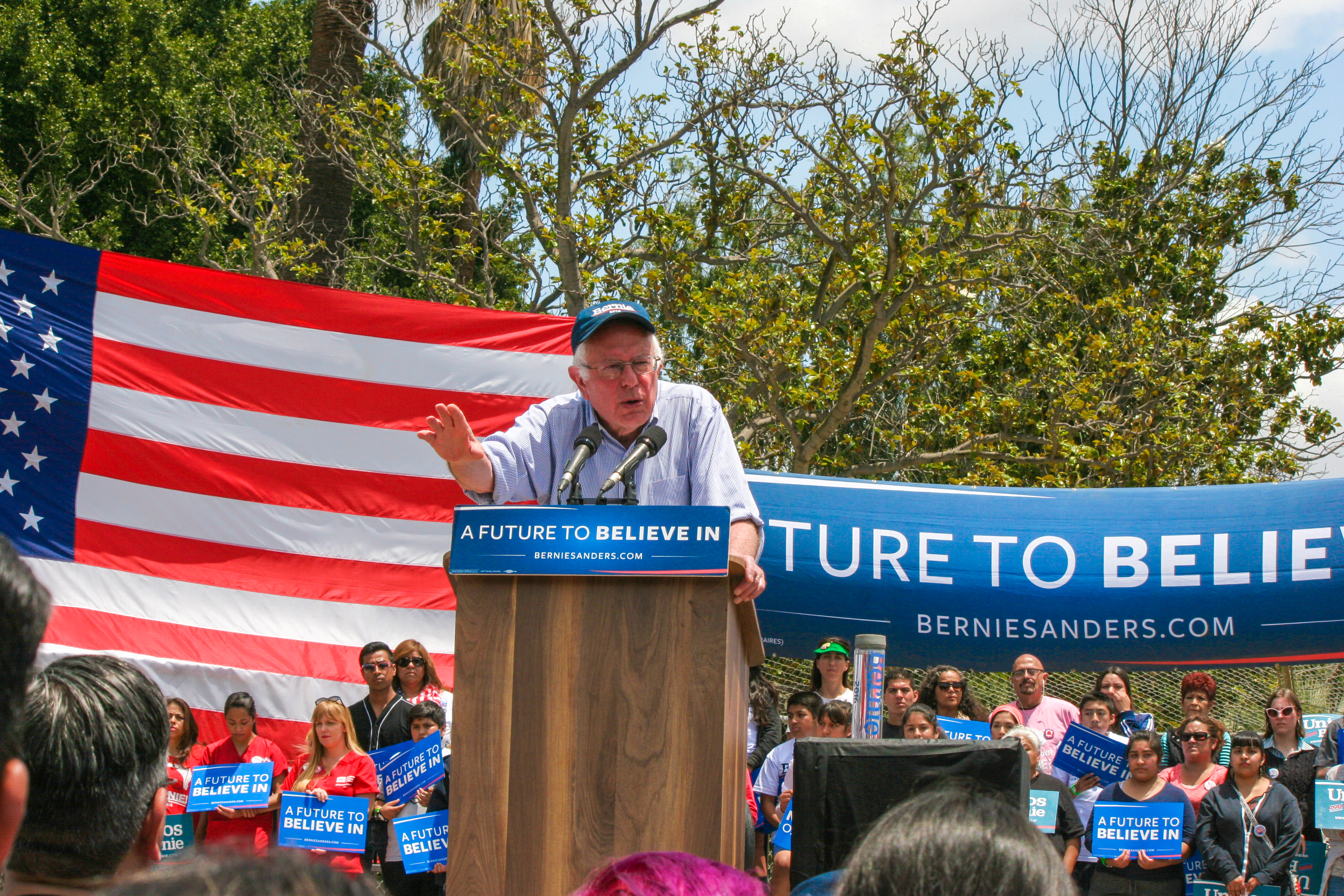
The Workplace Democracy Act of 1999, proposed by Bernie Sanders but not yet passed, would give every employee the representatives on boards of their pension plans, to control how vote are cast on corporate stocks. Currently investment managers control most voting rights in the economy using "other people's money".

The most important rights that ERISA 1974 did not cover were who controls investments and securities that beneficiaries' retirement savings buy. The largest form of retirement fund has become the 401(k). This is often an individual account that an employer sets up, and an investment management firm, such as Vanguard, Fidelity, Morgan Stanley or BlackRock, is then delegated the task of trading fund assets. Usually they also vote on corporate shares, assisted by a "proxy advice" firm such as ISS or Glass Lewis. Under ERISA 1974 §1102(a), a plan must merely have named fiduciaries who have "authority to control and manage the operation and administration of the plan", selected by "an employer or employee organization" or both jointly. Usually these fiduciaries or trustees, will delegate management to a professional firm, particularly because under §1105(d), if they do so, they will not be liable for an investment manager's breaches of duty. These investment managers buy a range of assets, particularly corporate stocks which have voting rights, as well as government bonds, corporate bonds, commodities, real estate or derivatives. Rights on those assets are in practice monopolized by investment managers, unless pension funds have organized to take voting in house, or to instruct their investment managers. Two main types of pension fund to do this are union organized Taft–Hartley plans, and state public pension plans. Under the amended National Labor Relations Act of 1935 §302(c)(5)(B) a union bargained plan has to be jointly managed by representatives of employers and employees. Although many local pension funds are not consolidated and have had critical funding notices from the Department of Labor, more funds with employee representation ensure that corporate voting rights are cast according to the preferences of their members. State public pensions are often larger, and have greater bargaining power to use on their members' behalf. State pension schemes invariably disclose the way trustees are selected. In 2005, on average more than a third of trustees were elected by employees or beneficiaries. For example, the California Government Code §20090 requires that its public employee pension fund, CalPERS has 13 members on its board, 6 elected by employees and beneficiaries. However, only pension funds of sufficient size have acted to replace investment manager voting. Furthermore, no general legislation requires voting rights for employees in pension funds, despite several proposals. For example, the Workplace Democracy Act of 1999, sponsored by Bernie Sanders then in the US House of Representatives, would have required all single employer pension plans to have trustees appointed equally by employers and employee representatives. There is, furthermore, currently no legislation to stop investment managers voting with other people's money as the Dodd–Frank Act of 2010 §957 banned broker-dealers voting on significant issues without instructions. This means votes in the largest corporations that people's retirement savings buy are overwhelmingly exercised by investment managers, whose interests potentially conflict with the interests of beneficiaries' on labor rights, fair pay, job security, or pension policy.

=== Health and safety ===
The Occupational Safety and Health Act, signed into law in 1970 by President Richard Nixon, creates specific standards for workplace safety. The act has spawned years of litigation by industry groups that have challenged the standards limiting the amount of permitted exposure to chemicals such as benzene. The Act also provides for protection for "whistleblowers" who complain to governmental authorities about unsafe conditions while allowing workers the right to refuse to work under unsafe conditions in certain circumstances. The act allows states to take over the administration of OSHA in their jurisdictions, so long as they adopt state laws at least as protective of workers' rights as under federal law. More than half of the states have done so.

- Child labor laws in the United States

=== Civil liberties ===
- Pickering v. Board of Education, 391 US 563 (1968) 8 to 1, a public school teacher was dismissed for writing a letter to a newspaper that criticized the way the school board was raising money. This violated the First Amendment and the Fourteenth Amendment
- Connick v. Myers, 461 U.S. 138 (1983) 5 to 4, a public attorney employee was not unlawfully dismissed after distributing a questionnaire to other staff on a supervisor's management practices after she was transferred under protest. In dissent, Brennan J held that all the matters were of public concern and should therefore be protected by the First Amendment
- Rankin v. McPherson, 483 U.S. 378 (1987) 5 to 4, a Texas deputy constable had a First Amendment right to say, after the assassination attempt on Ronald Reagan "Shoot, if they go for him again, I hope they get him." Dismissal was unlawful and she had to be reinstated because even extreme comments (except potentially advocating actual murder) against a political figure should be protected. She could not be fired for merely exercising a right in the Constitution.
- Waters v. Churchill, 511 U.S. 661 (1994) 7 to 2, a public hospital nurse stating, outside work at dinner, that the cross-training policies of the hospital were flawed, could be dismissed without any violation of the First Amendment because it could be seen as interfering with the employer's operations
- Garcetti v. Ceballos, 547 U.S. 410 (2006) 5 to 4, no right against dismissal or protected speech when the speech relates to a matter in one's profession
- Employee Polygraph Protection Act (1988) outlawed the use of lie detectors by private employers except in narrowly prescribed circumstances
- Whistleblower Protection Act (1989)
- Huffman v. Office of Personnel Management, 263 F.3d 1341 (Fed. Cir. 2001)
- O'Connor v. Ortega, 480 U.S. 709 (1987) searches in the workplace
- City of Ontario v. Quon, 130 S.Ct. 2619, (2010) the right of privacy did not extend to employer owned electronic devices so an employee could be dismissed for sending sexually explicit messages from an employer owned pager.
- Heffernan v. City of Paterson, 578 US __ (2016)

== Workplace participation ==
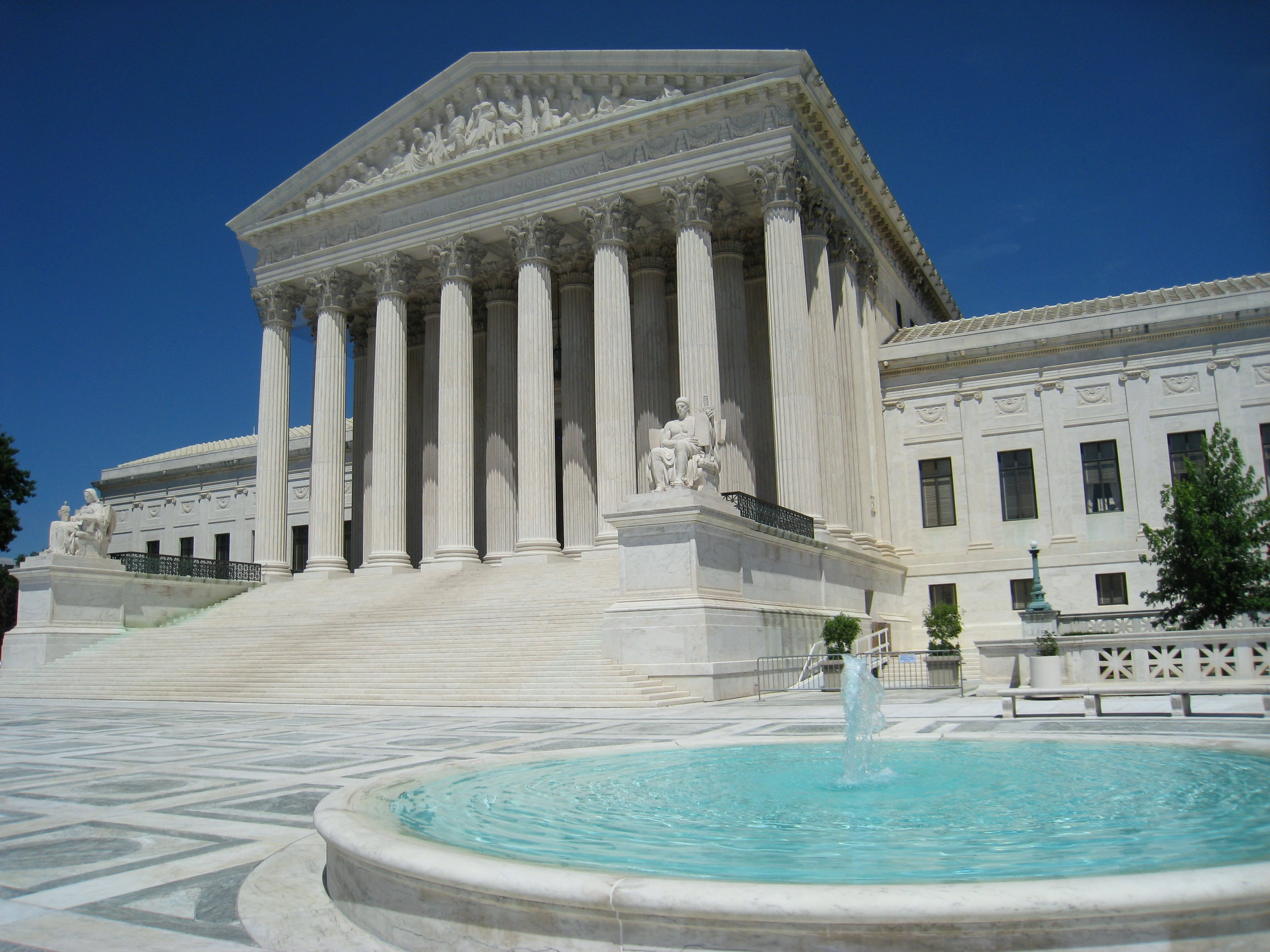
The US Supreme Court's policy of preemption since 1953 means federal collective bargaining rules cancel state rules, even if state law is more beneficial to employees. Despite preemption, many unions, corporations, and states have experimented with direct participation rights, to get a "fair day's wage for a fair day's work".

The central right in labor law, beyond minimum standards for pay, hours, pensions, safety or privacy, is to participate and vote in workplace governance. The American model developed from the Clayton Antitrust Act of 1914, which declared the "labor of a human being is not a commodity or article of commerce" and aimed to take workplace relations out of the reach of courts hostile to collective bargaining. Lacking success, the National Labor Relations Act of 1935 changed the basic model, which remained through the 20th century. Reflecting the "inequality of bargaining power between employees ... and employers who are organized in the corporate or other forms of ownership association", the NLRA 1935 codified basic rights of employees to organize a union, requires employers to bargain in good faith (at least on paper) after a union has majority support, binds employers to collective agreements, and protects the right to take collective action including a strike. Union membership, collective bargaining, and standards of living all increased rapidly until Congress enacted the Taft–Hartley Act of 1947. Its amendments enabled states to pass laws restricting agreements for all employees in a workplace to be unionized, prohibited collective action against associated employers, and introduced a list of unfair labor practices for unions, as well as employers. Since then, the US Supreme Court developed a doctrine that the rules in the NLRA 1935 preempted any other state rules if an activity was "arguably subject" to its rights and duties. While states were inhibited from acting as "laboratories of democracy", and particularly as unions were targeted from 1980 and membership fell, the NLRA 1935 has been criticized as a "failed statute" as US labor law "ossified". This has led to more innovative experiments among states, progressive corporations and unions to create direct participation rights, including the right to vote for or codetermine directors of corporate boards, and elect work councils with binding rights on workplace issues.

=== Labor unions ===
Freedom of association in labor unions has always been fundamental to the development of democratic society, and is protected by the First Amendment to the Constitution. In early colonial history, labor unions were routinely suppressed by the government. Recorded instances include cart drivers being fined for striking in 1677 in New York City, and carpenters prosecuted as criminals for striking in Savannah, Georgia in 1746. After the American Revolution, however, courts departed from repressive elements of English common law. The first reported case, Commonwealth v. Pullis in 1806 did find shoemakers in Philadelphia guilty of "a combination to raise their wages". Nevertheless, unions continued, and the first federation of trade unions was formed in 1834, the National Trades' Union, with the primary aim of a 10-hour working day. In 1842 the Supreme Court of Massachusetts held in Commonwealth v. Hunt that a strike by the Boston Journeymen Bootmakers' Society for higher wages was lawful. Chief Justice Shaw held that people "are free to work for whom they please, or not to work, if they so prefer" and "to agree together to exercise their own acknowledged rights". The abolition of slavery by Abraham Lincoln's Emancipation Proclamation during the American Civil War was necessary to create genuine rights to organize, but was not sufficient to ensure freedom of association. Using the Sherman Act of 1890, which was intended to break up business cartels, the Supreme Court imposed an injunction on striking workers of the Pullman Company, and imprisoned the leader, and future presidential candidate, Eugene Debs. The court also enabled unions to be sued for triple damages in Loewe v. Lawlor, a case involving a hat maker union in Danbury, Connecticut. The president and United States Congress responded by passing the Clayton Act of 1914 to take labor out of antitrust law. Then, after the Great Depression passed the National Labor Relations Act of 1935 to positively protect the right to organize and take collective action. After that, the law increasingly turned to regulate unions' internal affairs. The Taft–Hartley Act of 1947 regulated how members can join a union, and the Labor Management Reporting and Disclosure Act of 1959 created a "bill of rights" for union members.

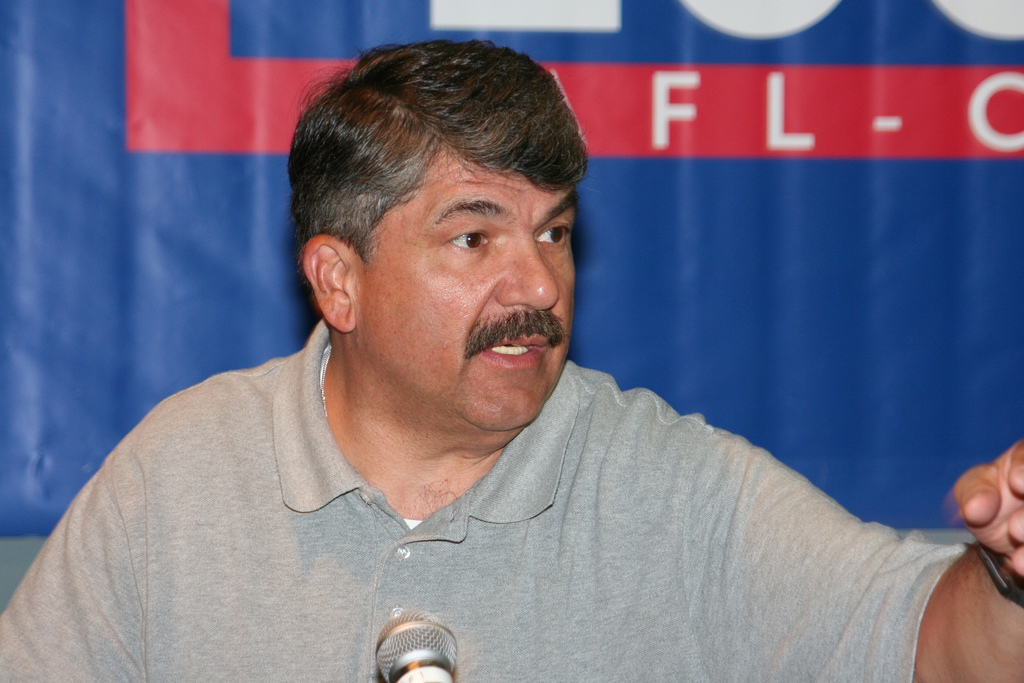
Richard Trumka was the late president of the AFL–CIO, a federation of unions, with 12.5m members. The Change to Win Federation has 5.5m members in affiliated unions. The two have negotiated merging to create a united American labor movement.

While union governance is founded upon freedom of association, the law requires basic standards of democracy and accountability to ensure members are truly free in shaping their associations. Fundamentally, all unions are democratic organizations, but they divide between those where members elect delegates, who in turn choose the executive, and those where members directly elect the executive. In 1957, after the McClellan Committee of the US Senate found evidence of two rival Teamsters Union executives, Jimmy Hoffa and Dave Beck, falsifying delegate vote counts and stealing union funds, Congress passed the Labor Management Reporting and Disclosure Act of 1959. Under § 411, every member has the right to vote, attend meetings, speak freely and organize, not have fees raised without a vote, not be deprived of the right to sue, or be suspended unjustly. Under § 431, unions should file their constitutions and bylaws with the secretary of labor and be accessible by members: today union constitutions are online. Under § 481 elections must occur at least every 5 years, and local officers every 3 years, by secret ballot. Additionally, state law may bar union officials who have prior convictions for felonies from holding office. As a response to the Hoffa and Beck scandals, there is also an express fiduciary duty on union officers for members' money, limits on loans to executives, requirements for bonds for handling money, and up to a $10,000 fine or up to 5 years prison for embezzlement. These rules, however, restated most of what was already the law, and codified principles of governance that unions already undertook. On the other hand, under § 501(b) to bring a lawsuit, a union member must first make a demand on the executive to correct wrongdoing before any claim can be made to a court, even for misapplication of funds, and potentially wait four months' time. The Supreme Court has held that union members can intervene in enforcement proceedings brought by the US Department of Labor. Federal courts may review decisions by the Department to proceed with any prosecutions. The range of rights, and the level of enforcement has meant that labor unions display significantly higher standards of accountability, with fewer scandals, than corporations or financial institutions.

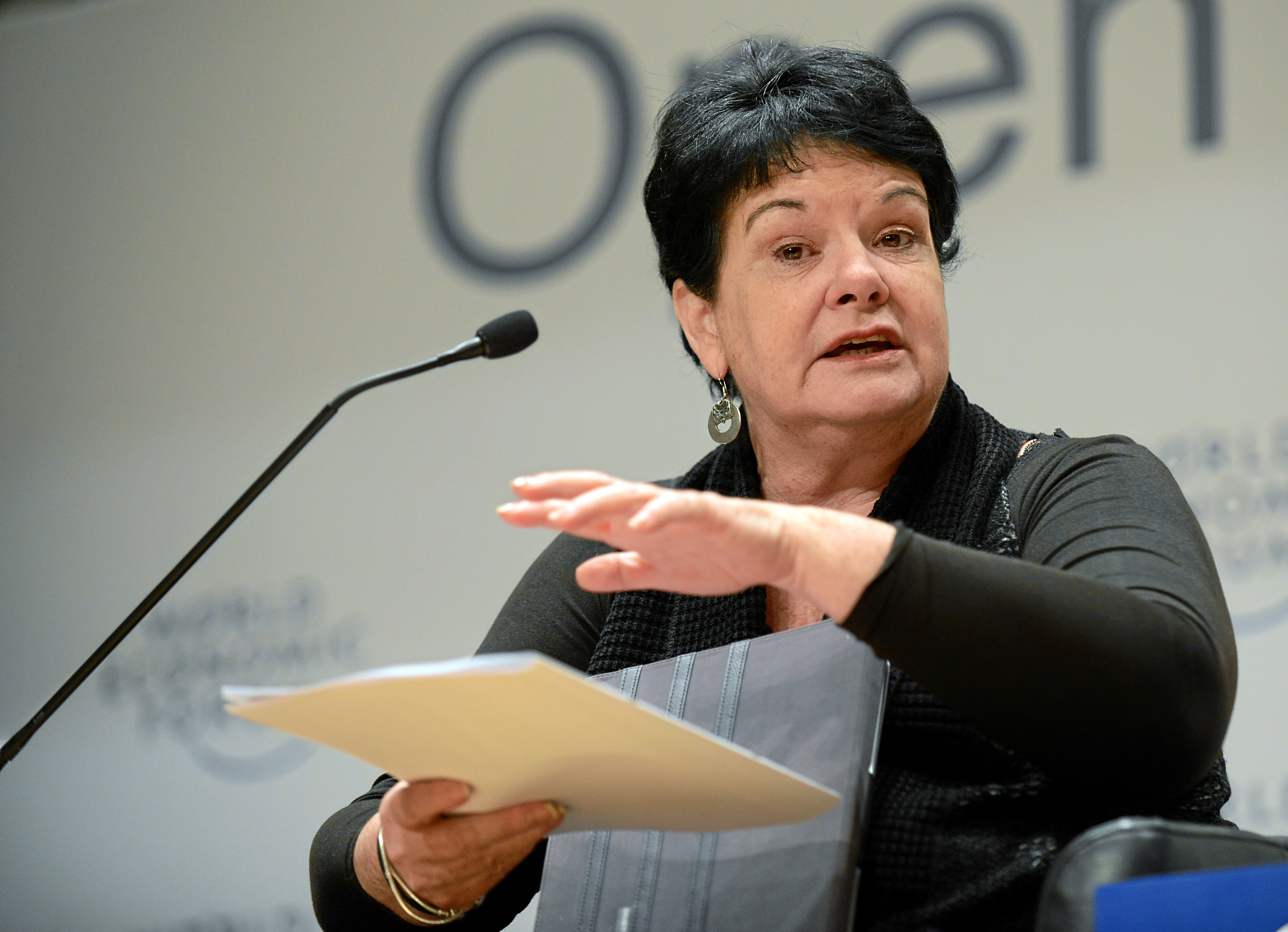
Sharan Burrow leads the International Trade Union Confederation, which represents labor union members worldwide, via each national group including the AFL–CIO.

Beyond members rights within a labor union, the most controversial issue has been how people become members in unions. This affects union membership numbers, and whether labor rights are promoted or suppressed in democratic politics. Historically, unions made collective agreements with employers that all new workers would have to join the union. This was to prevent employers trying to dilute and divide union support, and ultimately refuse to improve wages and conditions in collective bargaining. However, after the Taft–Hartley Act of 1947, the National Labor Relations Act of 1935 § 158(a)(3) was amended to ban employers from refusing to hire a non-union employee. An employee can be required to join the union (if such a collective agreement is in place) after 30 days. But § 164(b) was added to codify a right of states to pass so called "right to work laws" that prohibit unions making collective agreements to register all workers as union members, or collect fees for the service of collective bargaining. Over time, as more states with Republican governments passed laws restricting union membership agreements, there has been a significant decline of union density. Unions have not, however, yet experimented with agreements to automatically enroll employees in unions with a right to opt out. In International Ass'n of Machinists v. Street, a majority of the US Supreme Court, against three dissenting justices, held that the First Amendment precluded making an employee become a union member against their will, but it would be lawful to collect fees to reflect the benefits from collective bargaining: fees could not be used for spending on political activities without the member's consent. Unions have always been entitled to publicly campaign for members of Congress or presidential candidates that support labor rights. But the urgency of political spending was raised when in 1976 Buckley v. Valeo decided, over powerful dissents of White J and Marshall J, that candidates could spend unlimited money on their own political campaign, and then in First National Bank of Boston v. Bellotti, that corporations could engage in election spending. In 2010, over four dissenting justices, Citizens United v. FEC held there could be essentially no limits to corporate spending. By contrast, every other democratic country caps spending (usually as well as regulating donations) as the original Federal Election Campaign Act of 1971 had intended to do. A unanimous court held in Abood v. Detroit Board of Education that union security agreements to collect fees from non-members were also allowed in the public sector. However, in Harris v. Quinn five US Supreme Court judges reversed this ruling apparently banning public sector union security agreements, and were about to do the same for all unions in Friedrichs v. California Teachers Association until Scalia J died, halting an anti-labor majority on the Supreme Court. In 2018, Janus v. AFSCME the Supreme Court held by 5 to 4 that collecting mandatory union fees from public sector employees violated the First Amendment. The dissenting judges argued that union fees merely paid for benefits of collective bargaining that non-members otherwise received for free. These factors led campaign finance reform to be one of the most important issues in the 2016 US Presidential election, for the future of the labor movement, and democratic life.

=== Collective bargaining ===
Since the Industrial Revolution, collective bargaining has been the main way to get fair pay, improved conditions, and a voice at work. The need for positive rights to organize and bargain was gradually appreciated after the Clayton Antitrust Act of 1914. Under §6, labor rights were declared to be outside of antitrust law, but this did not stop hostile employers and courts suppressing unions. In Adair v. United States, and Coppage v. Kansas, the Supreme Court, over powerful dissents, asserted the Constitution empowered employers to require employees to sign contracts promising they would not join a union. These "yellow-dog contracts" were offered to employees on a "take it or leave it" basis, and effectively stopped unionization. They lasted until the Great Depression when the Norris–La Guardia Act of 1932 banned them. This also prevented the courts from issuing any injunctions or enforcing any agreements in the context of a labor dispute. After the landslide election of Franklin D. Roosevelt, the National Labor Relations Act of 1935 was drafted to create positive rights for collective bargaining in most of the private sector. It aimed to create a system of federal rights so that, under §157, employees would gain the legal "right to self-organization", "to bargain collectively" and use "concerted activities" including strikes for "mutual aid or other protection". The act was meant to increase bargaining power of employees to get better terms in than individual contracts with employing corporations. However §152 excluded many groups of workers, such as state and federal government employees, railway and airline staff, domestic and agriculture workers. These groups depend on special federal statutes like the Railway Labor Act or state law rules, like the California Agricultural Labor Relations Act of 1975. In 1979, five Supreme Court judges, over four forceful dissents, also introduced an exception for church operated schools, apparently because of "serious First Amendment questions". Furthermore, "independent contractors" are excluded, even though many are economically dependent workers. Some courts have attempted to expand the "independent contractor" exception. In 2009, in FedEx Home Delivery v. NLRB the DC Circuit, adopting submissions of FedEx's lawyer Ted Cruz, held that post truck drivers were independent contractors because they took on "entrepreneurial opportunity". Garland J dissented, arguing the majority had departed from common law tests. The "independent contractor" category was estimated to remove protection from 8 million workers. While many states have higher rates, the US has an 11.1 per cent unionization rate and 12.3 per cent rate of coverage by collective agreement. This is the lowest in the industrialized world.

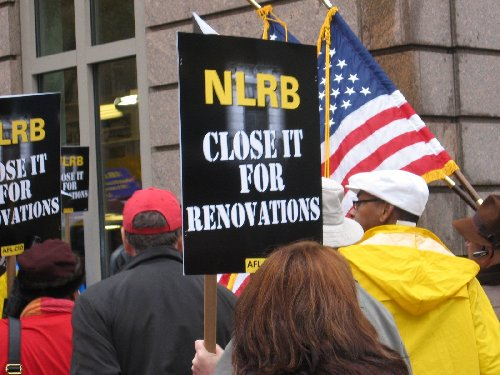
After 1981 air traffic control strike, when Ronald Reagan fired every air traffic controller, the National Labor Relations Board was staffed by people opposed to collective bargaining. Between 2007 and 2013 the NLRB was shut down as the president and then Senate refused to make appointments.

At any point employers can freely bargain with union representatives and make a collective agreement. Under NLRA 1935 §158(d) the mandatory subjects of collective bargaining include "wages, hours, and other terms and conditions of employment". A collective agreement will typically aim to get rights including a fair day's wage for a fair day's work, reasonable notice and severance pay before any necessary layoffs, just cause for any job termination, and arbitration to resolve disputes. It could also extend to any subject by mutual agreement. A union can encourage an employing entity through collective action to sign a deal, without using the NLRA 1935 procedure. But, if an employing entity refuses to deal with a union, and a union wishes, the National Labor Relations Board (NLRB) may oversee a legal process up to the conclusion of a legally binding collective agreement. By law, the NLRB is meant to have five members "appointed by the President by and with the advice and consent of the Senate", and play a central role in promoting collective bargaining. First, the NLRB will determine an appropriate "bargaining unit" of employees with employers (e.g., offices in a city, or state, or whole economic sector), The NLRB favors "enterprise bargaining" over "sectoral collective bargaining", which means US unions have traditionally been smaller with less bargaining power by international standards. Second, a union with "majority" support of employees in a bargaining unit becomes "the exclusive representatives of all the employees". But to ascertain majority support, the NLRB supervises the fairness of elections among the workforce. It is typical for the NLRB to take six weeks from a petition from workers to an election being held. During this time, managers may attempt to persuade or coerce employees using high-pressure tactics or unfair labor practices (e.g. threatening job termination, alleging unions will bankrupt the firm) to vote against recognizing the union. The average time for the NLRB to decide upon complaints of unfair labor practices had grown to 483 days in 2009 when its last annual report was written. Third, if a union does win majority support in a bargaining unit election, the employing entity will have an "obligation to bargain collectively". This means meeting union representatives "at reasonable times and confer in good faith with respect to wages, hours, and other terms" to put in a "written contract". The NLRB cannot compel an employer to agree, but it was thought that the NLRB's power to sanction an employer for an "unfair labor practice" if they did not bargain in good faith would be sufficient. For example, in JI Case Co v. National Labor Relations Board the Supreme Court held an employer could not refuse to bargain on the basis that individual contracts were already in place. Crucially, in Wallace Corp. v. NLRB the Supreme Court also held that an employer only bargaining with a company union, which it dominated, was an unfair labor practice. The employer should have recognized the truly independent union affiliated to the Congress of Industrial Organizations (CIO). However, in NLRB v. Sands Manufacturing Co. the Supreme Court held an employer did not commit an unfair trade practice by shutting down a water heater plant, while the union was attempting to prevent new employees being paid less. Moreover, after 2007 President George W. Bush and the Senate refused to make any appointments to the Board, and it was held by five judges, over four dissents, in New Process Steel, L.P. v. NLRB that rules made by two remaining members were ineffective. While appointments were made in 2013, agreement was not reached on one vacant seat. Increasingly it has been made politically unfeasible for the NLRB to act to promote collective bargaining.

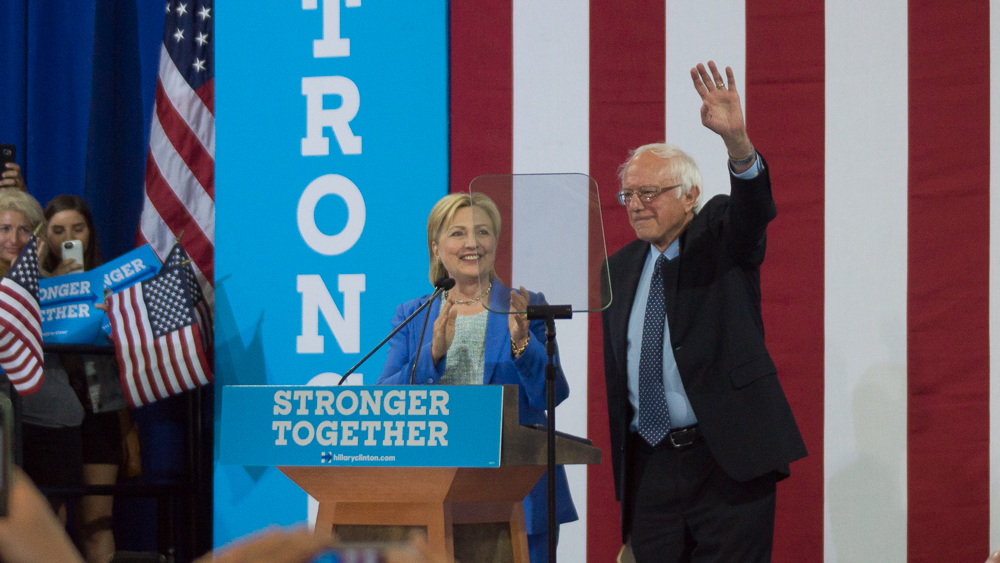
The proposed Employee Free Choice Act, sponsored repeatedly by Hillary Clinton, Bernie Sanders and Democrat representatives, would require employers to bargain in 90 days or go to arbitration, if a simple majority of employees sign cards supporting the union. It has been blocked by Republicans in Congress.

Once collective agreements have been signed, they are legally enforceable, often through arbitration, and ultimately in federal court. Federal law must be applied for national uniformity, so state courts must apply federal law when asked to deal with collective agreements or the dispute can be removed to federal court. Usually, collective agreements include provisions for sending grievances of employees or disputes to binding arbitration, governed by the Federal Arbitration Act of 1925. For example, in United Steelworkers v. Warrior & Gulf Navigation Co a group of employees at a steel transportation works in Chickasaw, Alabama, requested the corporation go to arbitration over layoffs and outsourcing of 19 staff on lower pay to do the same jobs. The United Steelworkers had a collective agreement which contained a provision for arbitration. Douglas J held that any doubts about whether the agreement allowed the issue to go to arbitration "should be resolved in favor of coverage." An arbitrator's award is entitled to judicial enforcement so long as its essence is from the collective agreement. Courts can decline to enforce an agreement based on public policy, but this is different from "general considerations of supposed public interests". But while federal policy had encouraged arbitration where unions and employers had made agreements, the Supreme Court drew a clear distinction for arbitration over individual statutory rights. In Alexander v. Gardner-Denver Co. an employee claimed he was unjustly terminated, and suffered unlawful race discrimination under the Civil Rights Act of 1964. The Supreme Court held that he was entitled to pursue remedies both through arbitration and the public courts, which could re-evaluate the claim whatever the arbitrator had decided. But then, in 2009 in 14 Penn Plaza LLC v. Pyett Thomas J announced with four other judges that apparently "[n]othing in the law suggests a distinction between the status of arbitration agreements signed by an individual employee and those agreed to by a union representative." This meant that a group of employees were denied the right to go to a public court under the Age Discrimination in Employment Act of 1967, and instead potentially be heard only by arbitrators their employer selected. Stevens J and Souter J, joined by Ginsburg J, Breyer J dissented, pointing out that rights cannot be waived even by collective bargaining. An Arbitration Fairness Act of 2011 has been proposed to reverse this, urging that "employees have little or no meaningful choice whether to submit their claims to arbitration". It remains unclear why NLRA 1935 §1, recognizing workers' "inequality of bargaining power" was not considered relevant to ensure that collective bargaining can only improve upon rights, rather than take them away. To address further perceived defects of the NLRA 1935 and the Supreme Court's interpretations, major proposed reforms have included the Labor Reform Act of 1977, the Workplace Democracy Act of 1999, and the Employee Free Choice Act of 2009. All focus on speeding the election procedure for union recognition, speeding hearings for unfair labor practices, and improving remedies within the existing structure of labor relations.

=== Right to organize ===
To ensure that employees are effectively able to bargain for a collective agreement, the NLRA 1935 created a group of rights in §158 to stall "unfair labor practices" by employers. These were considerably amended by the Taft–Hartley Act of 1947, where the US Congress over the veto of President Harry S. Truman decided to add a list of unfair labor practices for labor unions. This has meant that union organizing in the US may involve substantial levels of litigation which most workers cannot afford. The fundamental principle of freedom of association, however, is recognized worldwide to require various rights. It extends to the state, so in Hague v. Committee for Industrial Organization held the New Jersey mayor violated the First Amendment when trying to shut down CIO meetings because he thought they were "communist". Among many rights and duties relating to unfair labor practices, five main groups of case have emerged.

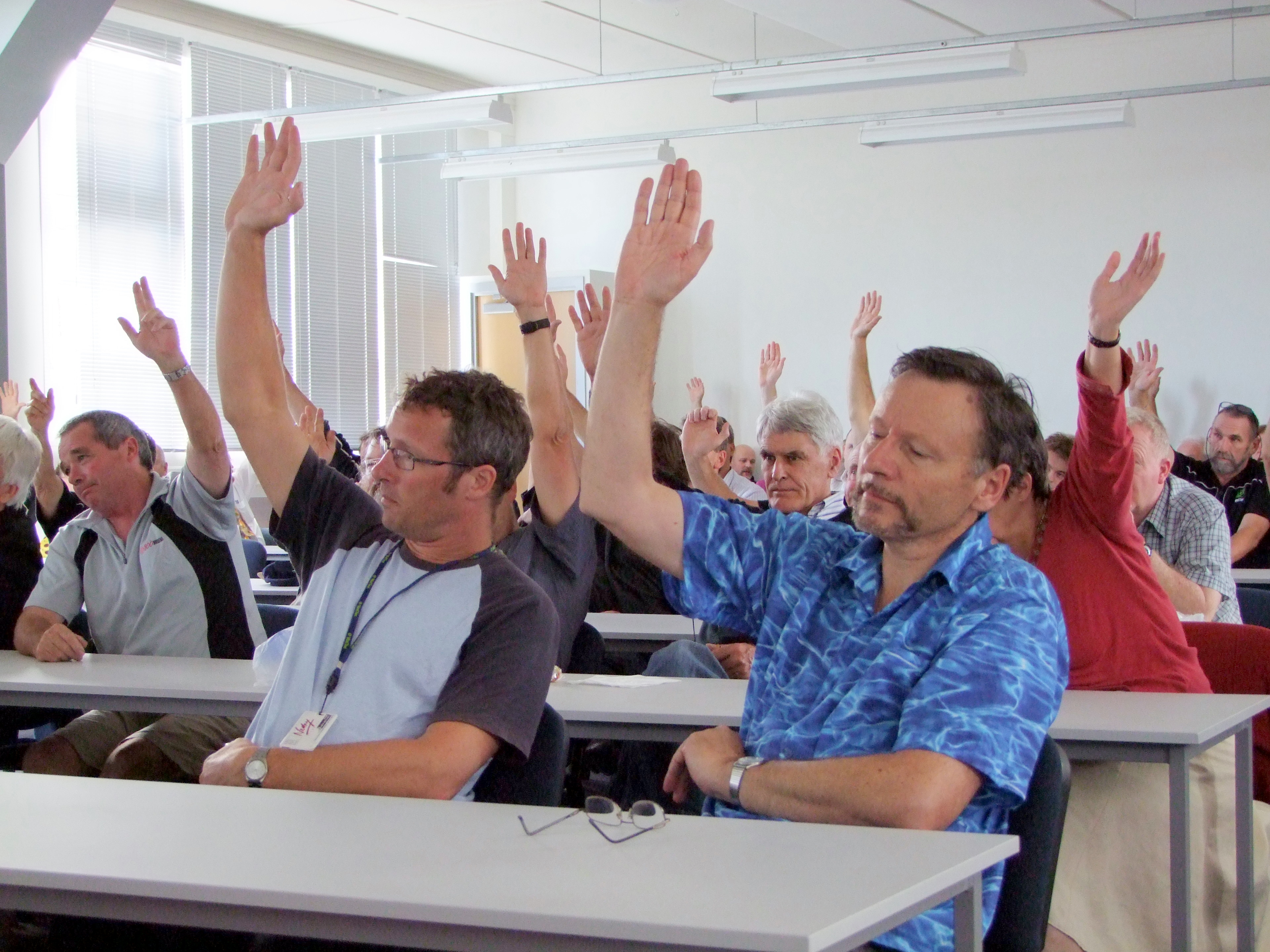
Unfair labor practices, made unlawful by the National Labor Relations Act of 1935 §153, prohibit employers discriminating against people who organize a union and vote to get a voice at work.

First, under §158(a)(3)–(4) a person who joins a union must suffer no discrimination or retaliation in their chances for being hired, terms of their work, or in termination. For example, in one of the first cases, NLRB v. Jones & Laughlin Steel Corp, the US Supreme Court held that the National Labor Relations Board was entitled to order workers be rehired after they had been dismissed for organizing a union at their plant in Aliquippa, Pennsylvania. It is also unlawful for employers to monitor employees who are organizing, for instance by parking outside a union meeting, or videotaping employees giving out union fliers. This can include giving people incentives or bribes to not join a union. So in NLRB v. Erie Resistor Corp the Supreme Court held it was unlawful to give 20 years extra seniority to employees who crossed a picket line while the union had called a strike. Second, and by contrast, the Supreme Court had decided in Textile Workers Union of America v. Darlington Manufacturing Co Inc that actually shutting down a recently unionized division of an enterprise was lawful, unless it was proven that the employer was motivated by hostility to the union. Third, union members need the right to be represented, in order to carry out basic functions of collective bargaining and settle grievances or disciplinary hearings with management. This entails a duty of fair representation. In NLRB v. J. Weingarten, Inc. the Supreme Court held that an employee in a unionized workplace had the right to a union representative present in a management interview, if it could result in disciplinary action. Although the NLRB has changed its position with different political appointees, the DC Circuit has held the same right goes that non-union workers were equally entitled to be accompanied. Fourth, under §158(a)(5) it is an unfair labor practice to refuse to bargain in good faith, and out of this a right has developed for a union to receive information necessary to perform collective bargaining work. However, in Detroit Edison Co v. NLRB the Supreme Court divided 5 to 4 on whether a union was entitled to receive individual testing scores from a program the employer used. Also, in Lechmere, Inc. v. National Labor Relations Board the Supreme Court held 6 to 3 that an employer was entitled to prevent union members, who were not employees, from entering the company parking lot to hand out leaflets. Fifth, there are a large group of cases concerning "unfair" practices of labor organizations, listed in §158(b). For example, in Pattern Makers League of North America v. NLRB an employer claimed a union had committed an unfair practice by attempting to enforce fines against employees who had been members, but quit during a strike when their membership agreement promised they would not. Five judges to four dissents held that such fines could not be enforced against people who were no longer union members.

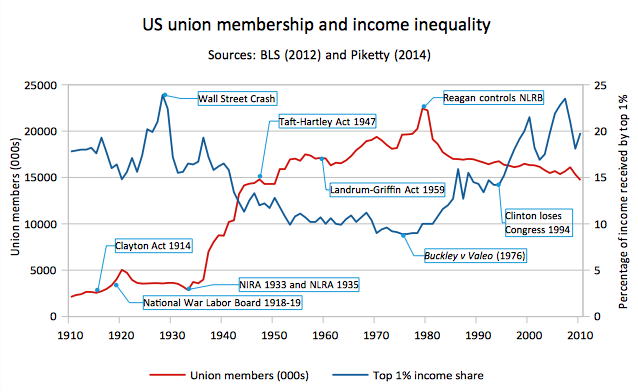
As union membership declined income inequality rose, because labor unions have been the main way to participate at work. The US does not yet require employee representatives on boards of directors, or elected work councils.

The US Supreme Court policy of preemption, developed from 1953, means that states cannot legislate where the NLRA 1935 does operate. The NLRA 1935 contains no clause requiring preemption as is found, for example, in the Fair Labor Standards Act 1938 §218(a) where deviations from the minimum wage or maximum hours are preempted, unless they are more beneficial to the employee. The first major case, Garner v. Teamsters Local 776, decided a Pennsylvania statute was preempted from providing superior remedies or processing claims quicker than the NLRB because "the Board was vested with power to entertain petitioners' grievance, to issue its own complaint" and apparent "Congress evidently considered that centralized administration of specially designed procedures was necessary to obtain uniform application of its substantive rules". In San Diego Building Trades Council v. Garmon, the Supreme Court held that the California Supreme Court was not entitled to award remedies against a union for picketing, because if "an activity is arguably subject to §7 or §8 of the Act, the States as well as the federal courts must defer to the exclusive competence of the National Labor Relations Board". This was true, even though the NLRB had not given any ruling on the dispute because its monetary value was too small. This reasoning was extended in Lodge 76, International Association of Machinists v Wisconsin Employment Relations Commission, where a Wisconsin Employment Relations Commission sought to hold a union liable for an unfair labor practice, by refusing to work overtime. Brennan J held that such matters were to be left to "be controlled by the free play of economic forces". While some of these judgments appeared beneficial to unions against hostile state courts or bodies, supportive actions also began to be held preempted. In Golden State Transit Corp. v. City of Los Angeles a majority of the Supreme Court held that Los Angeles was not entitled to refuse to renew a taxi company's franchise license because the Teamsters Union had pressured it not to until a dispute was resolved. Most recently in Chamber of Commerce v. Brown seven judges on the Supreme Court held that California was preempted from passing a law prohibiting any recipient of state funds either from using money to promote or deter union organizing efforts. Breyer J and Ginsburg J dissented because the law was simply neutral to the bargaining process. State governments may, however, use their funds to procure corporations to do work that are union or labor friendly.

=== Collective action ===
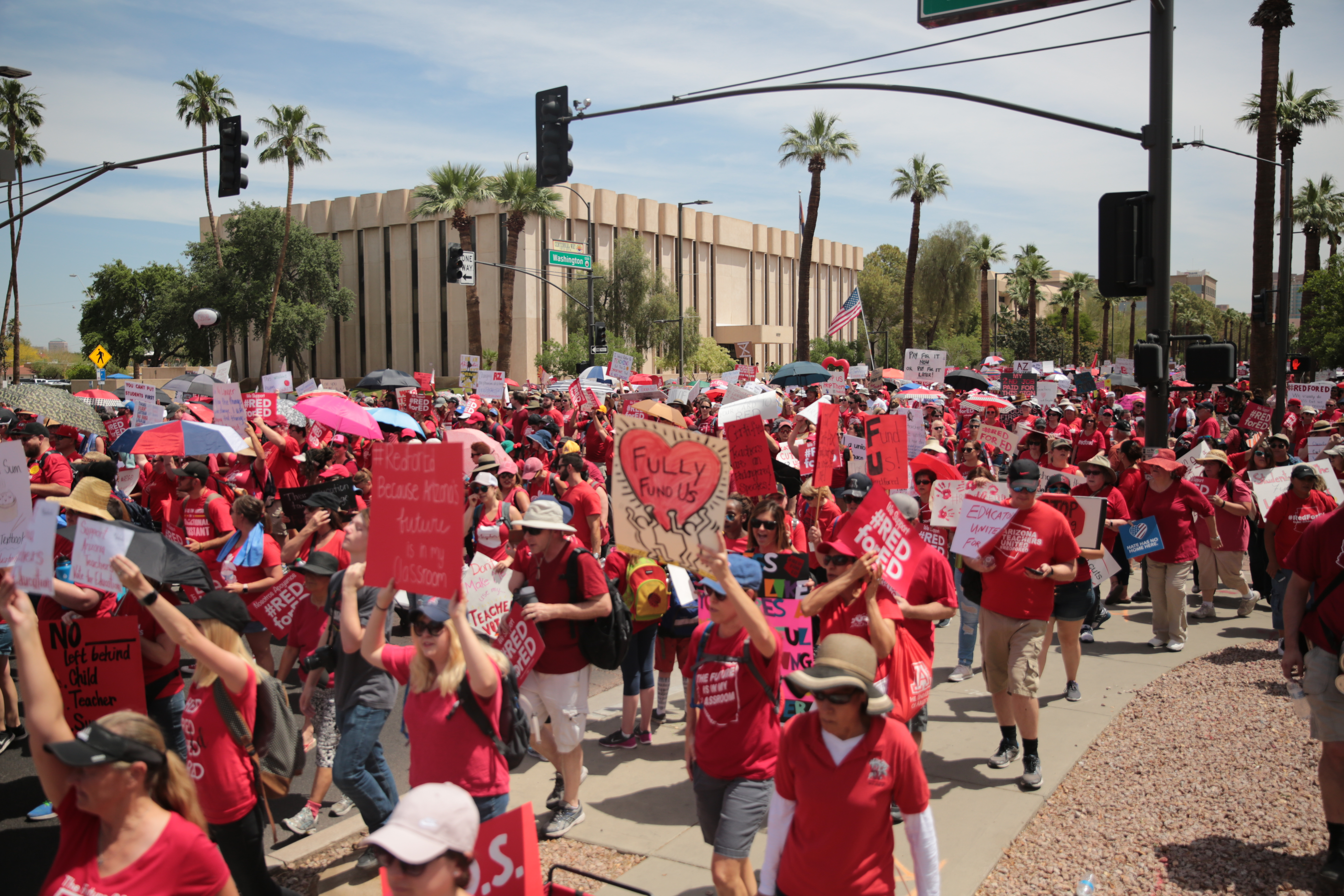
All workers, like the Arizona teachers in 2019, are guaranteed the right to take collective action, including strikes, by international law, federal law and most state laws.

The right of labor to take collective action, including the right to strike, has been fundamental to common law, federal law, and international law for over a century. As New York teacher unions argued in the 1960s, "If you can't call a strike you don't have real collective bargaining, you have 'collective begging.'" During the 19th century, many courts upheld the right to strike, but others issued injunctions to frustrate strikes, and when the Sherman Antitrust Act of 1890 was passed to prohibit business combinations in restraint of trade, it was first used against labor unions. This resulted in Eugene Debs, American Railway Union leader and future Socialist Presidential candidate, being imprisoned for taking part in the Pullman Strike. The Supreme Court persisted in Loewe v. Lawlor in imposing damages for strikes under antitrust law, until Congress passed the Clayton Act of 1914. Seen as "the Magna Carta of America's workers", this proclaimed that all collective action by workers was outside antitrust law under the Commerce Clause, because "labor is not a commodity or article of commerce". It became fundamental that no antitrust sanctions could be imposed, if "a union acts in its self-interest and does not combine with non-labor groups." The same principles entered the founding documents of the International Labour Organization in 1919. Finally at the end of the Lochner era the National Labor Relations Act of 1935 §157 enshrined the right "to engage in other concerted activities for the purpose of collective bargaining or other mutual aid or protection" and in §163, the "right to strike".

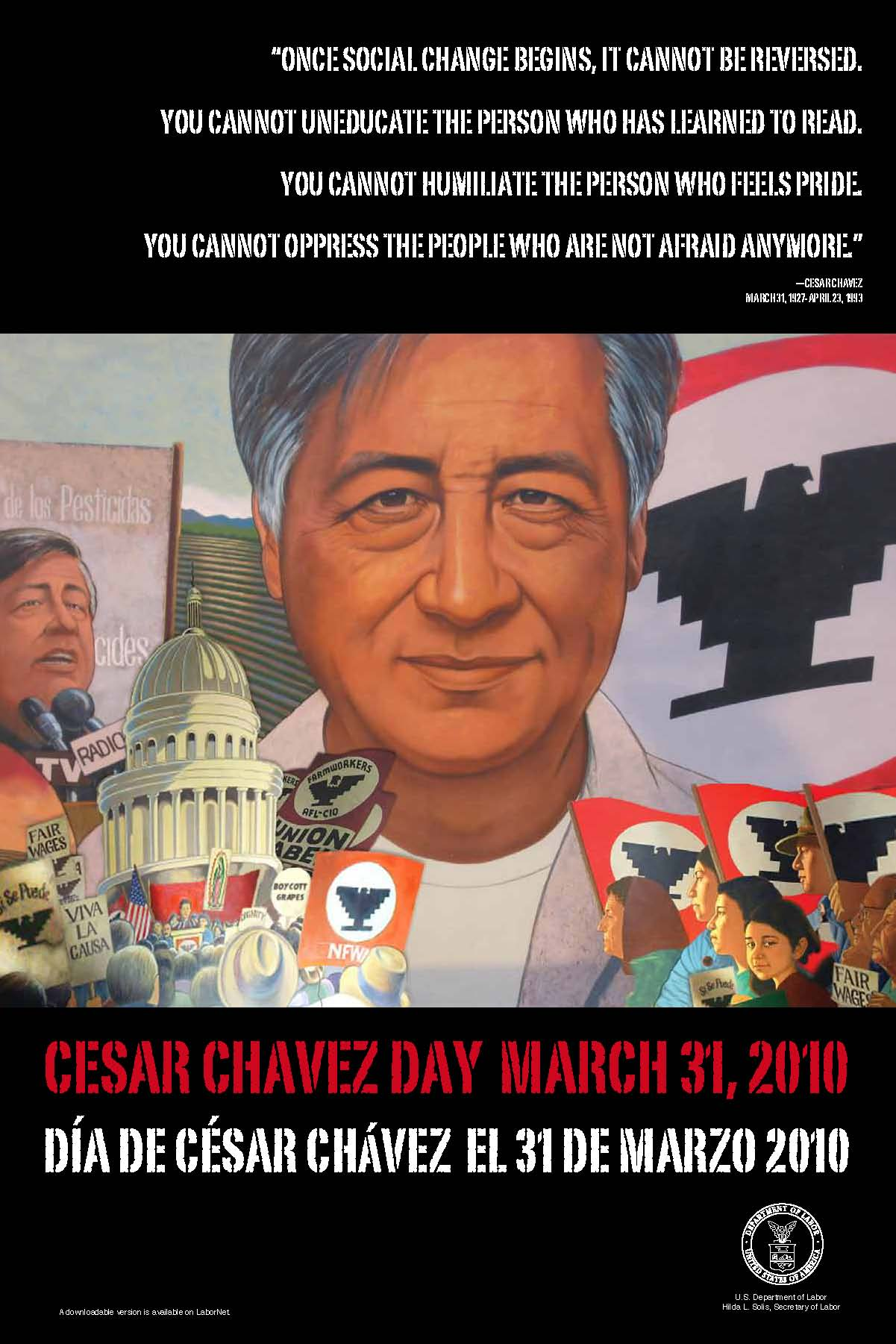
Cesar Chavez organized the United Farm Workers and campaigned for social justice under the slogan "Yes we can" and "Sí, se puede".

Although federal law guarantees the right to strike, American labor unions face the most severe constraints in the developed world in taking collective action. First, the law constrains the purposes for which strikes are allowed. The National Labor Relations Act of 1935 only covers "employees" in the private sector, and a variety of state laws attempt to suppress government workers' right to strike, including for teachers, police and firefighters, without adequate alternatives to set fair wages. Workers have the right to take protected concerted activity. But NLRB v. Insurance Agents' International Union held that although employees refusing to perform part of their jobs in a "partial strike" was not a failure to act in good faith, they could be potentially be discharged: perversely, this encourages workers to conduct an all-out strike instead. Second, since 1947 the law made it an "unfair labor practice" for employees to take collective action that is not a "primary strike or primary picketing" against the contractual employer. This prohibition on solidarity action includes a ban on employees of a subsidiary corporation striking in concert with employees of a parent corporation, employees striking with employees of competitors, against outsourced businesses, or against suppliers. However the same standards are not applied to employers: in NLRB v. Truck Drivers Local 449, the Supreme Court held that a group of seven employers were entitled to lock out workers of a union at once, in response to a strike at just one of the employers by the union. This said, employees may peacefully persuade customers to boycott any employer or related employer, for instance by giving out handbills. Third, a union is bound to act in good faith if it has negotiated a collective agreement, unless an employer commits an unfair labor practice. The union must also give 60 days warning before undertaking any strike while a collective agreement is in force. An employer must also act in good faith, and an allegation of a violation must be based on "substantial evidence": declining to reply to the National Labor Relations Board's attempts to mediate was held to be insubstantial.

2016 Presidential candidate Bernie Sanders joined the Communication Workers Union strike against Verizon. American workers face serious obstacles to strike action, falling below international labor law standards.

The fourth constraint, and most significant, on the right to strike is the lack of protection from unjust discharge. Other countries protect employees from any detriment or discharge for strike action, but the Supreme Court held in NLRB v. Mackay Radio & Telegraph Co. that employees on strike could be replaced by strikebreakers, and it was not an unfair labor practice for the employer to refuse to discharge the strikebreakers after the dispute was over. This decision is widely condemned as a violation of international law. However the Supreme Court further held in NLRB v. Fansteel Metallurgical Corp. that the Labor Board cannot order an employer to rehire striking workers, and has even held that employers could induce younger employees more senior jobs as a reward for breaking a strike. Fifth, the Supreme Court has not consistently upheld the right to free speech and peaceful picketing. In NLRB v. Electrical Workers the Supreme Court held that an employer could discharge employees who disparaged an employer's TV broadcasts while a labor dispute was running, on the pretext that the employees' speech had no connection to the dispute. On the other hand, the Supreme Court has held there was a right to picket shops that refused to hire African-American workers. The Supreme Court declared an Alabama law, which fined and imprisoned a picketer, to be unconstitutional. The Supreme Court held unions could write newspaper publications to advocate for pro-labor political candidates. It also held a union could distribute political leaflets in non-work areas of the employer's property. In all of these rights, however, the remedies available to employees for unfair labor practices are minimal, because employees can still be locked out and the board cannot order reinstatement in the course of a good faith labor dispute. For this reason, a majority of labor law experts support the laws on collective bargaining and collective action being rewritten from a clean slate.

=== Right to vote at work ===
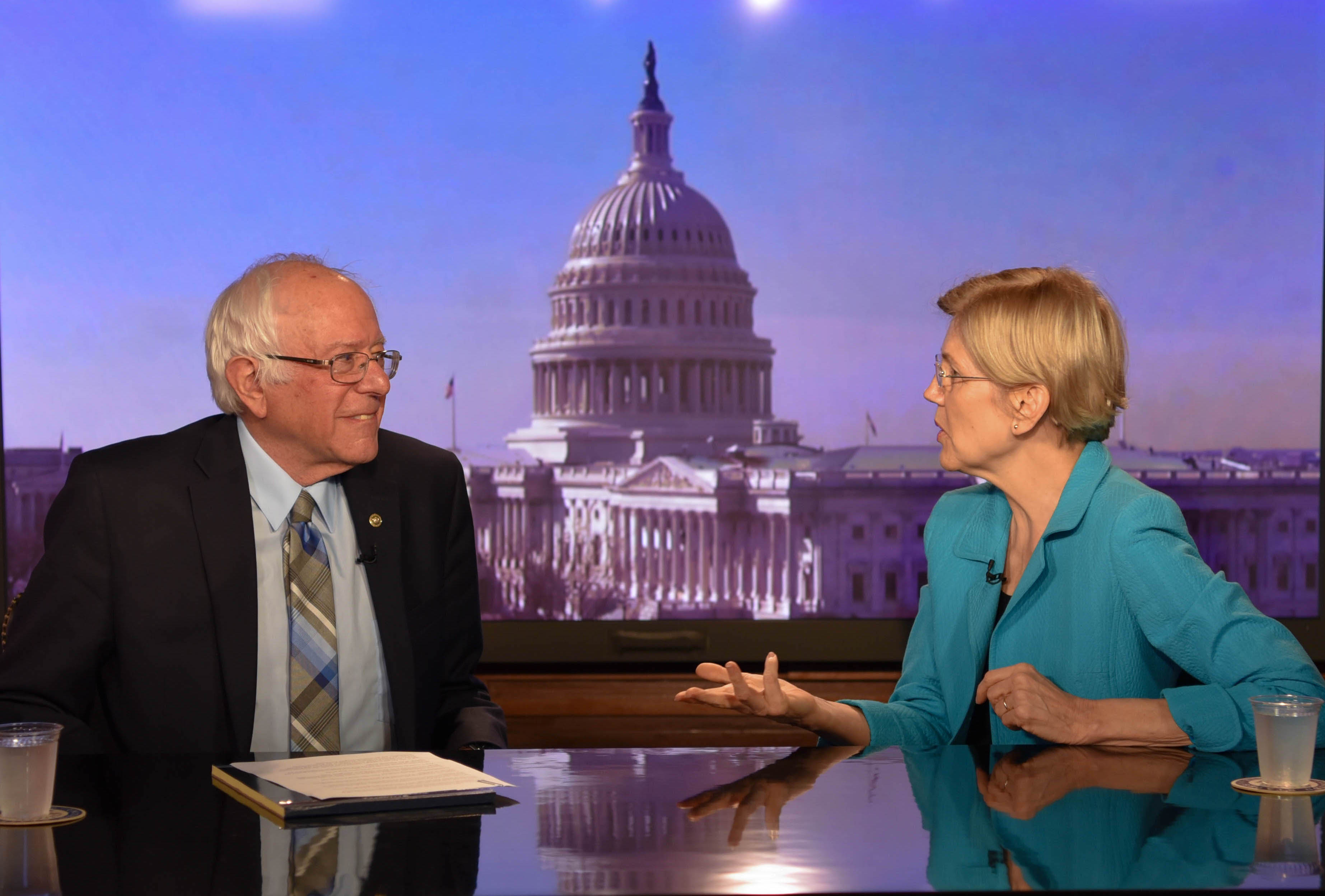
Elizabeth Warren and Bernie Sanders co-sponsored the Reward Work Act, introduced by Tammy Baldwin, for at least one third of listed company boards to be elected by employees, and more for large corporations. In 1980 the United Auto Workers collectively agreed Chrysler Corp employees would be on the board of directors, but despite experiments, today asset managers monopolize voting rights in corporations with "other people's money".

While collective bargaining was stalled by US Supreme Court preemption policy, a dysfunctional National Labor Relations Board, and falling union membership rate since the Taft–Hartley Act of 1947, employees have demanded direct voting rights at work: for corporate boards of directors, and in work councils that bind management. This has become an important complement to both strengthening collective bargaining, and securing the votes in labor's capital on pension boards, which buy and vote on corporate stocks, and control employers. Labor law has increasingly converged with corporate law, and in 2018 the first federal law, the Reward Work Act was proposed by three US senators to enable employees to vote for one third of the directors on boards of listed companies. In 1919, under the Republican governor Calvin Coolidge, Massachusetts became the first state with a right for employees in manufacturing companies to have employee representatives on the board of directors, but only if corporate stockholders voluntarily agreed. Also in 1919 both Procter & Gamble and the General Ice Delivery Company of Detroit had employee representation on boards. Board representation for employees spread through the 1920s, many without requiring any employee stock ownership plan. In the early 20th century, labor law theory split between those who advocated collective bargaining backed by strike action, those who advocated a greater role for binding arbitration, and proponents of codetermination as "industrial democracy". Today, these methods are seen as complements, not alternatives. A majority of countries in the Organisation for Economic Co-operation and Development have laws requiring direct participation rights. In 1994, the Dunlop Commission on the Future of Worker-Management Relations: Final Report examined law reform to improve collective labor relations, and suggested minor amendments to encourage worker involvement. Congressional division prevented federal reform, but labor unions and state legislatures have experimented.

... while there are many contributing causes to unrest ... one cause ... is fundamental. That is the necessary conflict—the contrast between our political liberty and our industrial absolutism. We are as free politically, perhaps, as free as it is possible for us to be. ... On the other hand, in dealing with industrial problems, the position of the ordinary worker is exactly the reverse. The individual employee has no effective voice or vote. And the main objection, as I see it, to the very large corporation is, that it makes possible—and in many cases makes inevitable—the exercise of industrial absolutism. ... The social justice for which we are striving is an incident of our democracy, not its main end ... the end for which we must strive is the attainment of rule by the people, and that involves industrial democracy as well as political democracy.

— Louis Brandeis, Testimony to Commission on Industrial Relations (1916) vol 8, 7659–7660

Corporations are chartered under state law, the larger mostly in Delaware, but leave investors free to organize voting rights and board representation as they choose. Because of unequal bargaining power, but also because of historic caution among American labor unions about taking on management, shareholders have come to monopolize voting rights in American corporations. From the 1970s employees and unions sought representation on company boards. This could happen through collective agreements, as it historically occurred in Germany or other countries, or through employees demanding further representation through employee stock ownership plans, but they aimed for voice independent from capital risks that could not be diversified. By 1980, workers had attempted to secure board representation at corporations including United Airlines, the General Tire and Rubber Company, and the Providence and Worcester Railroad. However, in 1974 the Securities and Exchange Commission, run by appointees of Richard Nixon, had rejected that employees who held shares in AT&T were entitled to make shareholder proposals to include employee representatives on the board of directors. This position was eventually reversed expressly by the Dodd–Frank Act of 2010 §971, which subject to rules by the Securities and Exchange Commission entitles shareholders to put forward nominations for the board. Instead of pursuing board seats through shareholder resolutions the United Auto Workers, for example, successfully sought board representation by collective agreement at Chrysler in 1980. The United Steel Workers secured board representation in five corporations in 1993. Some representation plans were linked to employee stock ownership plans, and were open to abuse. At the energy company, Enron, workers were encouraged by management to invest an average of 62.5 per cent of their retirement savings from 401(k) plans in Enron stock against basic principles of prudent, diversified investment, and had no board representation. When Enron collapsed in 2003, employees lost a majority of their pension savings. For this reason, employees and unions have sought representation because they invest their labor in the firm, and do not want undiversifiable capital risk. Empirical research suggests by 1999 there were at least 35 major employee representation plans with worker directors, though often linked to corporate stock.

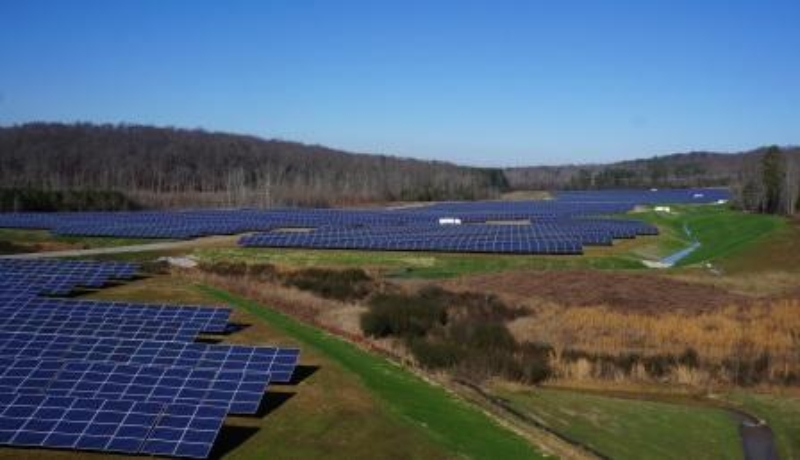
Powered by a solar farm, the Volkswagen plant at Chattanooga, Tennessee, has debated introducing work councils to give employees and its labor union more of a voice at work.

As well as representation on a corporation's board of directors, or top management, employees have sought binding rights (for instance, over working time, break arrangement, and layoffs) in their organizations through elected work councils. After the National War Labor Board was established by the Woodrow Wilson administration, firms established work councils with some rights throughout the 1920s. Frequently, however, management refused to concede the "right to employ and discharge, the direction of the working forces, and the management of the business" in any way, which from the workforce perspective defeated the object. As the US presidency changed to the Republican party during the 1920s, work "councils" were often instituted by employers that did not have free elections or proceedings, to forestall independent labor unions' right to collective bargaining. For this reason, the National Labor Relations Act of 1935 §158(a)(2) ensured it was an unfair labor practice for an employer "to dominate or interfere with the formation or administration of any labor organization, or contribute financial or other support to it". This was designed to enable free work councils, genuinely independent from management, but not dominated work councils or so called "company unions". For example, a work council law was passed by the US government in Allied-occupied Germany called Control Council Law, No 22. This empowered German workers to organize work councils if elected by democratic methods, with secret ballots, using participation of free labor unions, with basic functions ranging from how to apply collective agreements, regulating health and safety, rules for engagements, dismissals and grievances, proposals for improving work methods, and organizing social and welfare facilities. These rules were subsequently updated and adopted in German law, although American employees themselves did not yet develop a practice of bargaining for work councils, nor did states implement work council rules, even though neither were preempted by the National Labor Relations Act of 1935. In 1992, the National Labor Relations Board in its Electromation, Inc, and EI du Pont de Nemours, decisions confirmed that while management dominated councils were unlawful, genuine and independent work councils would not be. The Dunlop Report in 1994 produced an inconclusive discussion that favored experimentation with work councils. A Republican Congress did propose a Teamwork for Employees and Managers Act of 1995 to repeal §158(a)(2), but this was vetoed by President Bill Clinton as it would have enabled management dominated unions and councils. In 2014, workers at the Volkswagen Chattanooga Assembly Plant, in Chattanooga, Tennessee, sought to establish a work council. This was initially supported by management, but its stance changed in 2016, after the United Auto Workers succeeded in winning a ballot for traditional representation in an exclusive bargaining unit. As it stands, employees have no widespread right to vote in American workplaces, which has increased the gap between political democracy and traditional labor law goals of workplace and economic democracy.

== Equality and discrimination ==
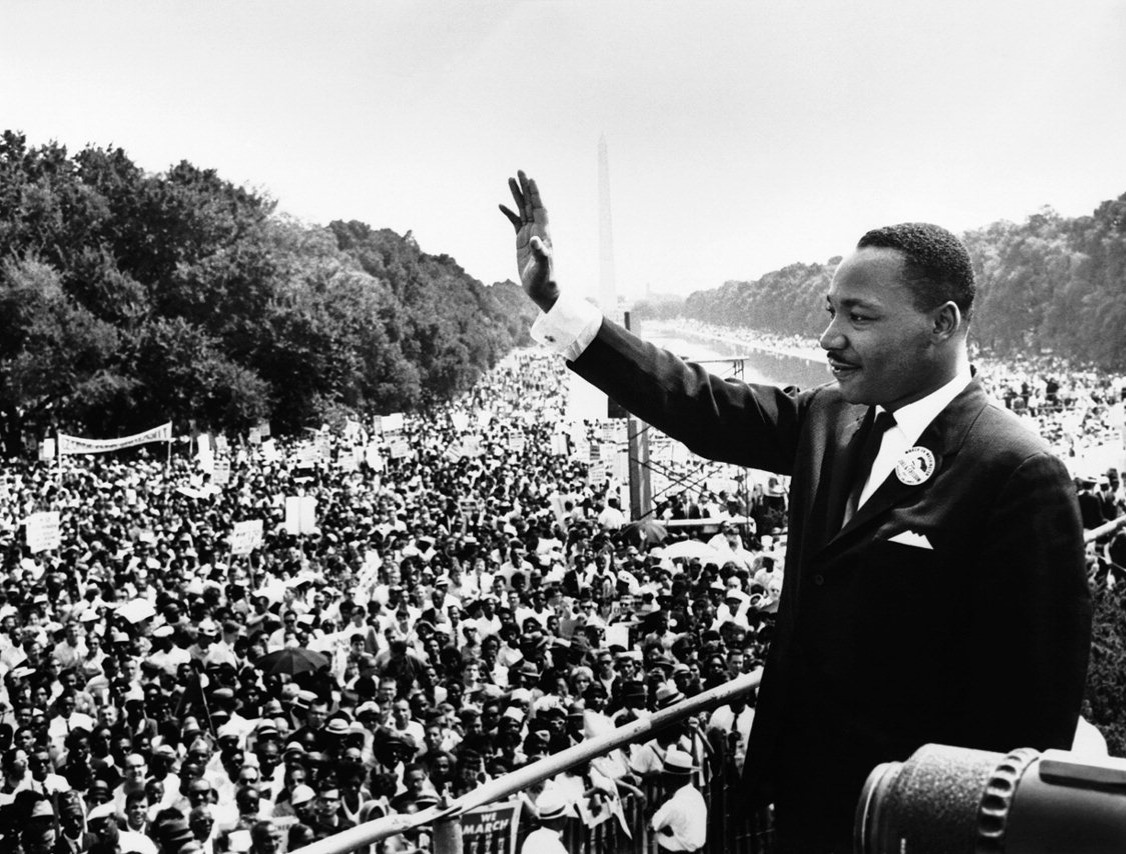
The world's first general equality law, the Civil Rights Act of 1964, followed the March on Washington for Jobs and Freedom in 1963. The head of the movement, Martin Luther King Jr. told America, "I have a dream that one day ... little black boys and black girls will be able to join hands with little white boys and white girls as sisters and brothers."

Since the US Declaration of Independence in 1776 proclaimed that "all men are created equal", the Constitution was progressively amended, and legislation was written, to spread equal rights to all people. While the right to vote was needed for true political participation, the "right to work" and "free choice of employment" came to be seen as necessary for "Life, Liberty and the pursuit of Happiness". After state laws experimented, President Franklin D. Roosevelt's Executive Order 8802 in 1941 set up the Fair Employment Practice Committee to ban discrimination by "race, creed, color or national origin" in the defense industry. The first comprehensive statutes were the Equal Pay Act of 1963, to limit discrimination by employers between men and women, and the Civil Rights Act of 1964, to stop discrimination based on "race, color, religion, sex, or national origin." In the following years, more "protected characteristics" were added by state and federal acts. The Age Discrimination in Employment Act of 1967 protects people over age 40. The Americans with Disabilities Act of 1990 requires "reasonable accommodation" to include people with disabilities in the workforce. Twenty two state Acts protect people based on sexual orientation in public and private employment, but proposed federal laws have been blocked by Republican opposition. There can be no detriment to union members, or people who have served in the military. In principle, states may require rights and remedies for employees that go beyond the federal minimum. Federal law has multiple exceptions, but generally requires no disparate treatment by employing entities, no disparate impact of formally neutral measures, and enables employers to voluntarily take affirmative action favoring under-represented people in their workforce. The law has not, however, succeeded in eliminating the disparities in income by race, health, age or socio-economic background.

=== Constitutional rights ===
The right to equality in employment in the United States comes from at least six major statutes, and limited jurisprudence of the US Supreme Court, leaving the law inconsistent and full of exceptions. Originally, the US Constitution entrenched gender, race and wealth inequality by enabling states to maintain slavery, reserve the vote to white, property owning men, and enabling employers to refuse employment to anyone. After the Emancipation Proclamation in the American Civil War, the Thirteenth, Fourteenth and Fifteenth Amendments attempted to enshrined equal civil rights for everyone, while the Civil Rights Act of 1866, and 1875 spelled out that everyone had the right to make contracts, hold property and access accommodation, transport and entertainment without discrimination. However, in 1883 the US Supreme Court in the Civil Rights Cases put an end to development by declaring that Congress was not allowed to regulate the actions of private individuals rather than public bodies. In his dissent, Harlan J would have held that no "corporation or individual wielding power under state authority for the public benefit" was entitled to "discriminate against freemen or citizens, in their civil rights".

A constitutional right to equality, based on the Equal Protection Clauses of the Fifth and Fourteenth Amendments has been disputed. 125 years after Harlan J wrote his famous dissent that all social institutions should be bound to equal rights, Barack Obama won election for President.

By 1944, the position had changed. In Steele v. Louisville & Nashville Railway Co., a Supreme Court majority held a labor union had a duty of fair representation and may not discriminate against members based on race under the Railway Labor Act of 1926 (or the National Labor Relations Act of 1935. Murphy J would have also based the duty on a right to equality in the Fifth Amendment). Subsequently, Johnson v. Railway Express Agency admitted that the old Enforcement Act of 1870 provided a remedy against private parties. However, the Courts have not yet accepted a general right of equality, regardless of public or private power. Legislation will usually be found unconstitutional, under the Fifth or Fourteenth Amendment if discrimination is shown to be intentional, or if it irrationally discriminates against one group. For example, in Cleveland Board of Education v. LaFleur the Supreme Court held by a majority of 5 to 2, that a school's requirement for women teachers to take mandatory maternity leave was unconstitutional, against the Due Process Clause, because it could not plausibly be shown that after child birth women could never perform a job. But while the US Supreme Court has failed, against dissent, to recognize a constitutional principle of equality, federal and state legislation contains the stronger rules. In principle, federal equality law always enables state law to create better rights and remedies for employees.

=== Equal treatment ===
Today legislation bans discrimination, that is unrelated to an employee's ability to do a job, based on sex, race, ethnicity, national origin, age and disability. The Equal Pay Act of 1963 banned gender pay discrimination, amending the Fair Labor Standards Act of 1938. Plaintiffs must show an employing entity pays them less than someone of the opposite sex in an "establishment" for work of "equal skill, effort, or responsibility" under "similar working conditions". Employing entities may raise a defense that pay differences result from a seniority or merit system unrelated to sex. For example, in Corning Glass Works v. Brennan the Supreme Court held that although women plaintiffs worked at different times in the day, compared to male colleagues, the working conditions were "sufficiently similar" and the claim was allowed. One drawback is the equal pay provisions are subject to multiple exemptions for groups of employees found in the FLSA 1938 itself. Another is that equal pay rules only operate within workers of an "enterprise", so that it has no effect upon high paying enterprises being more male dominated, nor child care being unequally shared between men and women that affects long-term career progression. Sex discrimination includes discrimination based on pregnancy, and is prohibited in general by the landmark Civil Rights Act of 1964.

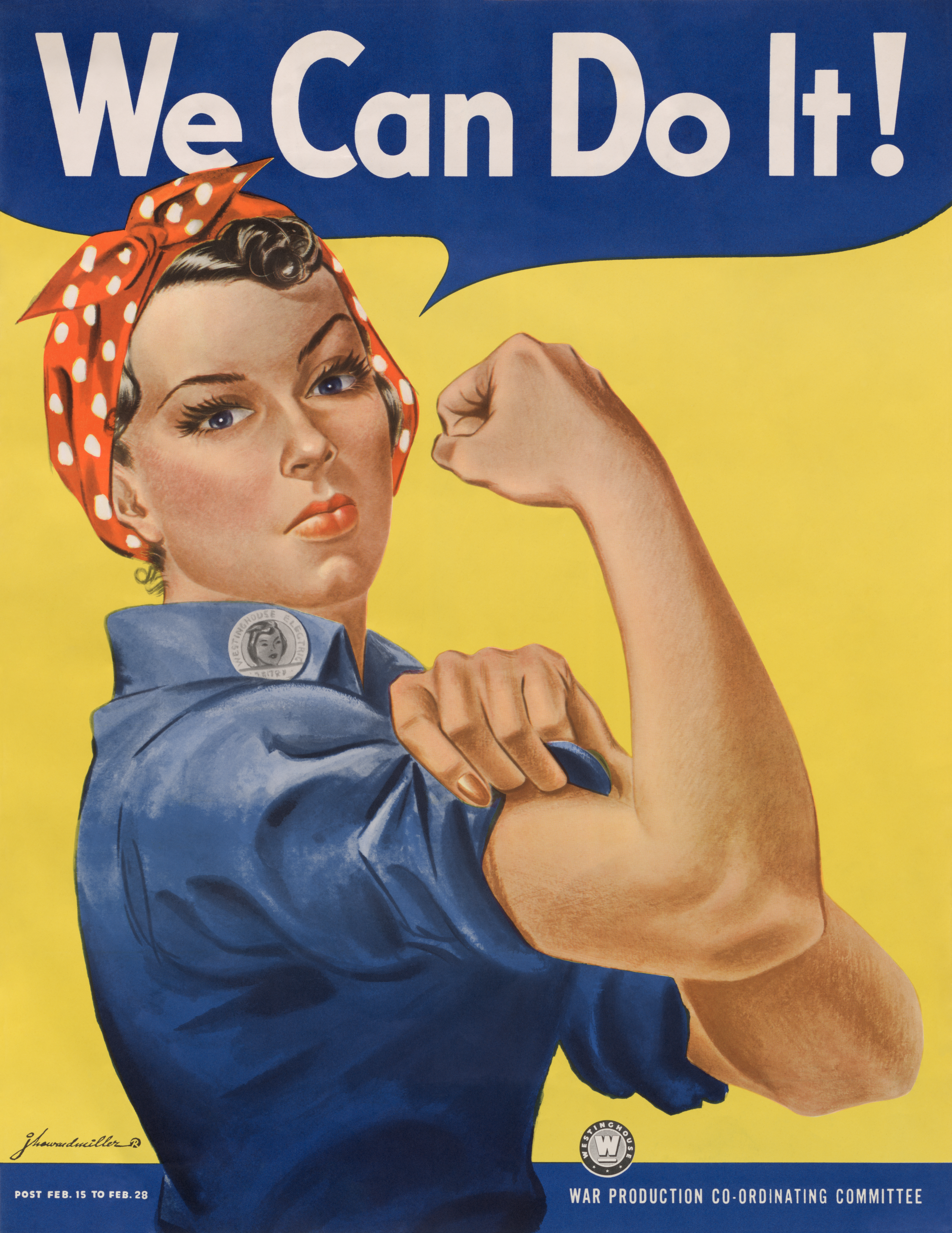
Rosie the Riveter symbolized women factory workers in World War II. The Equal Pay Act of 1963 banned pay discrimination within workplaces.

Beyond gender equality on the specific issue of pay, the Civil Rights Act of 1964 is the general anti-discrimination statute. Titles I to VI protects the equal right to vote, to access public accommodations, public services, schools, it strengthens the Civil Rights Commission, and requires equality in federally funded agencies. Title VII of the Civil Rights Act of 1964 bans discrimination in employment. Under §2000e-2, employers must not refuse to hire, discharge or discriminate "against any individual with respect to his compensation, terms, conditions or privileges of employment, because of such individual's race, color, religion, sex, or national origin." Segregation in employment is equally unlawful. The same basic rules apply for people over 40 years old, and for people with disabilities. Although states may go further, a significant limit to federal law is a duty only falls on private employers of more than 15 staff, or 20 staff for age discrimination. Within these limits, people can bring claims against disparate treatment. In Texas Department of Community Affairs v. Burdine the US Supreme Court held plaintiffs will establish a prima facie case of discrimination for not being hired if they are in a protected group, qualified for a job, but the job is given to someone of a different group. It is then up to an employer to rebut the case, by showing a legitimate reason for not hiring the plaintiff. However, in 1993, this position was altered in St. Mary's Honor Center v. Hicks where Scalia J held (over the dissent of four justices) that if an employer shows no discriminatory intent, an employee must not only show the reason is a pretext, but show additional evidence that discrimination has taken place. Souter J in dissent, pointed out the majority's approach was "inexplicable in forgiving employers who present false evidence in court".

Disparate treatment can be justified under CRA 1964 §2000e-2(e) if an employer shows selecting someone reflects by "religion, sex, or national origin is a bona fide occupational qualification reasonably necessary to the normal operation of that particular business or enterprise." Race is not included. For example, in Dothard v. Rawlinson the state of Alabama prohibited women from working as prison guards in "contact" jobs, with close proximity to prisoners. It also had minimum height and weight requirements (5"2 and 120 lbs), which it argued were necessary for proper security. Ms Rawlinson claimed both requirements were unlawful discrimination. A majority of 6 to 3 held that the gender restrictions in contact jobs were a bona fide occupational qualification, because there was a heightened risk of sexual assault, although Stewart J suggested the result might have differed if the prisons were better run. A majority held the height and weight restrictions, while neutral, had a disparate impact on women and were not justified by business necessity. By contrast, in Wilson v. Southwest Airlines Co., a Texas District Court held an airline was not entitled to require women only to work as cabin attendants (who were further required to be "dressed in high boots and hot-pants") even if it could show a consumer preference. The essence of the business was transporting passengers, rather than its advertising metaphor of "spreading love all over Texas", so that there was no "bona fide occupational requirement". Under the ADEA 1967, age requirements can be used, but only if reasonably necessary, or compelled by law or circumstance. For example, in Western Air Lines, Inc v. Criswell the Supreme Court held that airlines could require pilots to retire at age 60, because the Federal Aviation Administration required this. It could not, however, refuse to employ flight engineers over 60 because there was no comparable FAA rule.

We are confronted by powerful forces telling us to rely on the good will and understanding of those who profit by exploiting us. They deplore our discontent, they resent our will to organize, so that we may guarantee that humanity will prevail and equality will be exacted. They are shocked that action organizations, sit-ins, civil disobedience, and protests are becoming our everyday tools, just as strikes, demonstrations and union organization became yours to insure that bargaining power genuinely existed on both sides of the table. ...

— Martin Luther King Jr., Speech to the Fourth Constitutional Convention AFL–CIO Miami, Florida (11 December 1961)

In addition to prohibitions on discriminatory treatment, harassment, and detriment in retaliation for asserting rights, is prohibited. In a particularly obscene case, Meritor Savings Bank v. Vinson the Supreme Court unanimously held that a bank manager who coerced a woman employee into having sex with him 40 to 50 times, including rape on multiple occasions, had committed unlawful harassment within the meaning of 42 USC §2000e. But also if employees or managers create a "hostile or offensive working environment", this counts as discrimination. In Harris v. Forklift Systems, Inc. the Court held that a "hostile environment" did not have to "seriously affect employees' psychological well-being" to be unlawful. If the environment "would reasonably be perceived, and is perceived, as hostile or abusive" this is enough. Standard principles of agency and vicariously liability apply, so an employer is responsible for the actions of its agents, But according to Faragher v. City of Boca Raton an employing entity can avoid vicarious liability if it shows it (a) exercised reasonable care to prevent and promptly correct any harassment and (b) a plaintiff unreasonably failed to take advantage of opportunities to stop it. In addition, an employing entity may not retaliate against an employee for asserting his or her rights under the Civil Rights Act of 1964, or the Age Discrimination in Employment Act of 1967. In University of Pennsylvania v. Equal Employment Opportunity Commission, the Supreme Court held that a university was not entitled to refuse to give up peer review assessment documents in order for the EEOC to investigate the claim. Furthermore, in Robinson v. Shell Oil Co. the Supreme Court held that writing a negative job reference, after a plaintiff brought a race discrimination claim, was unlawful retaliation: employees were protected even if they had been fired. It has also been held that simply being reassigned to a slightly different job, operating forklifts, after making a sex discrimination complaint could amount to unlawful retaliation. This is all seen as necessary to make equal rights effective.

=== Equal impact and remedies ===
In addition to disparate treatment, employing entities may not use practices having an unjustified disparate impact on protected groups. In Griggs v. Duke Power Co., a power company on the Dan River, North Carolina, required a high school diploma for staff to transfer to higher paying non-manual jobs. Because of racial segregation in states like North Carolina, fewer black employees than white employees had diplomas. The court found a diploma was wholly unnecessary to perform the tasks in higher paying non-manual jobs. Burger CJ, for a unanimous Supreme Court, held the "Act proscribes not only overt discrimination, but also practices that are fair in form, but discriminatory in operation." An employer could show that a practice with disparate impact followed "business necessity" that was "related to job performance" but otherwise such practices would be prohibited. It is not necessary to show any intention to discriminate, just a discriminatory effect. Since amendments by the Civil Rights Act of 1991, if disparate impact is shown the law requires employers "to demonstrate that the challenged practice is job related for the position in question and consistent with business necessity" and that any non-discriminatory "alternative employment practice" is not feasible. On the other hand, in Ricci v. DeStefano five Supreme Court judges held the City of New Haven had acted unlawfully by discarding test results for firefighters, which it concluded could have had an unjustified disparate impact by race. In a further concurrence, Scalia J said "resolution of this dispute merely postpones the evil day" when a disparate impact might be found unconstitutional, against the [[Equal Protection Clause]] because, in his view, the lack of a good faith defense meant employers were compelled to do "racial decision making" that "is ... discriminatory." In dissent, Ginsburg J pointed out that disparate impact theory advances equality, and in no way requires behavior that is not geared to identifying people with skills necessary for jobs.

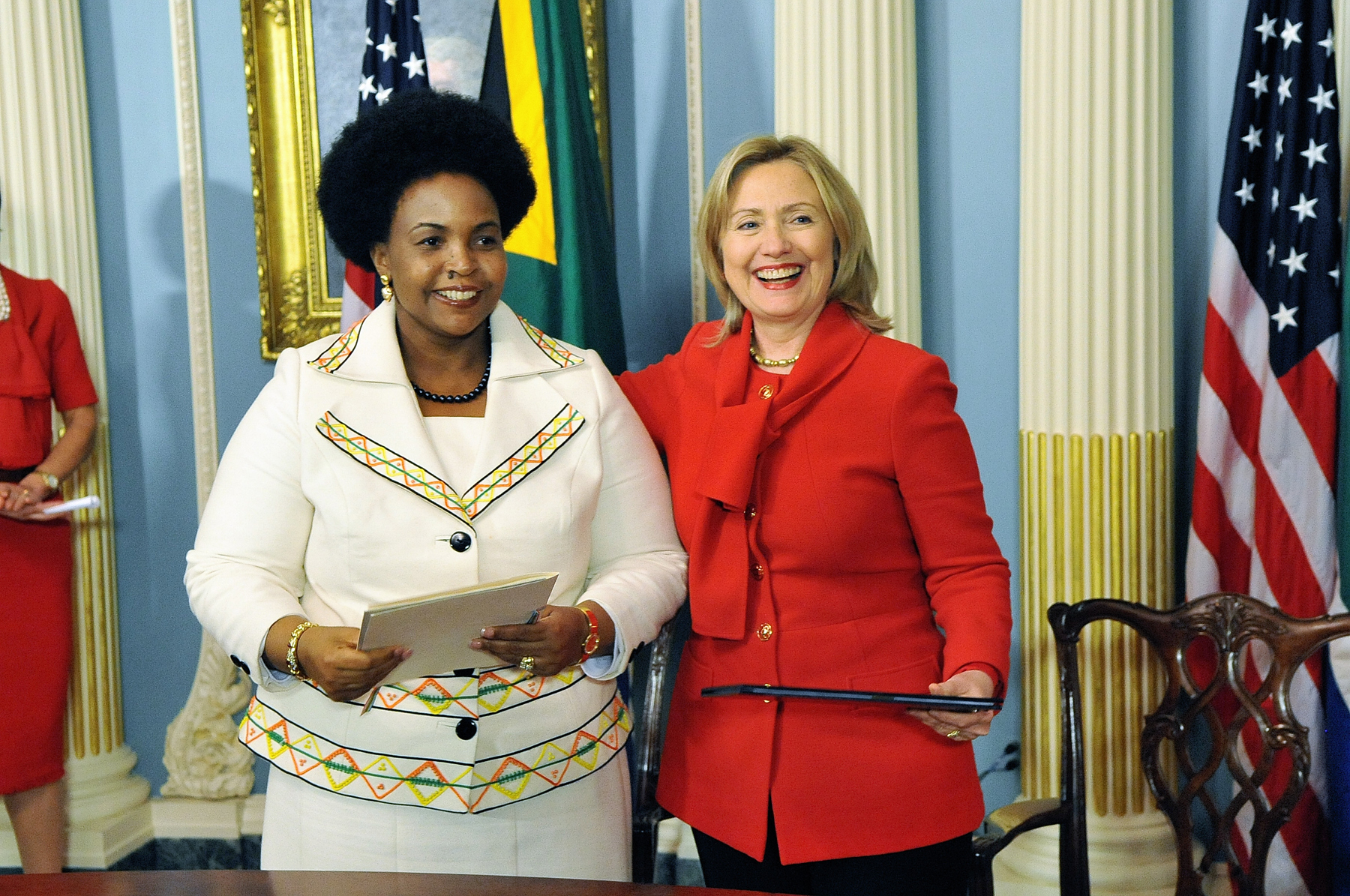
The Paycheck Fairness Act, repeatedly proposed by Democrats such as Hillary Clinton, would prevent employer defenses to sex discrimination that are related to gender. It has been rejected by Republicans in the United States Congress.

Both disparate treatment and disparate impact claims may be brought by an individual, or if there is a "pattern or practice" by the Equal Employment Opportunity Commission, the attorney general, and by class action. Under the Federal Rules of Civil Procedure, Rule 23 a class of people who share a common claim must be numerous, have "questions of law or fact common to the class", have representatives typical of the claimants, who would "fairly and adequately protect the interests of the class". Class actions may be brought, even in favor of people who are not already identified, for instance, if they have been discouraged from applying for jobs, so long as there is sufficiently specific presentation of issues of law and fact to certify the action.

A significant practical problem for disparate impact claims is the "Bennett Amendment" in the Civil Rights Act of 1964 §703(h). Though introduced as a supposedly "technical" amendment by a Utah Republican senator, it requires that claims for equal pay between men and women cannot be brought unless they fulfill the requirements of the Fair Labor Standards Act of 1938 § 206(d)(1). This says that employers have a defense to employee claims if unequal pay (purely based on gender) flows from "(i) a seniority system; (ii) a merit system; (iii) a system which measures earnings by quantity or quality of production; or (iv) a differential based on any other factor other than sex." By contrast, for claims alleging discriminatory pay on grounds of race, age, sexual orientation or other protected characteristics, an employer only has the more restricted defenses available in the CRA 1964 §703(h). In County of Washington v. Gunther the majority of the Supreme Court accepted that this was the correct definition. In principle, this meant that a group of women prison guards, who did less time working with prisoners than men guards, and also did different clerical work, would be able to bring a claim—there was no need to be doing entirely "equal work". However Rehnquist J dissented, arguing the Amendment should have put the plaintiffs in an even worse position: they should be required to prove they do "equal work", as is stated in the first part of §703(h). Nevertheless, the majority held that the gender pay provisions could be worse because, for example, an employer could apply ""a bona fide job rating system," so long as it does not discriminate on the basis of sex", whereas the same would not be possible for other claims under the Civil Rights Act of 1964. Given that a significant gender pay gap remains, it is not clear why any discrepancy or less favorable treatment, should remain at all.

=== Affirmative action ===
- Civil Rights Act of 1964, 42 USC §2000e-(j)
- United Steelworkers v. Weber, 443 U.S. 193 (1979) 5 to 3 held that the Civil Rights Act did not prohibit preference being given to under-represented groups as a temporary measure to correct historical disadvantage. Black workers were assured half the places in an on the job training program, pursuant to a collective agreement. Rehnquist J dissented.
- Bushey v. New York State Civil Service Commission, 733 F2d 220 (2nd 1984) the use of a separate grading curve on the New York Civil Service Commission entrance test for minority candidates was legitimate
- Johnson v. Transportation Agency 480 US 616 (1987) 7 to 2, White J and Scalia J dissenting an employer was entitled to give preference to women who possessed qualifications for a job, even if not equally qualified.
- Local No. 93, International Association of Firefighters v. City of Cleveland 478 US 501 (1986) a consent decree giving preference in promotions to black fireman in Cleveland was lawful under Title VII, although a District Court would not be entitled to impose a similar preference.
- Local 28, Sheet Metal Workers' International Association v. EEOC 478 US 421 (1986) a district court could have a goal of minority membership in a union that had a history of race discrimination in the construction industry.
- Wygant v. Jackson Board of Education 476 US 267 (1986) a preference for teachers to be laid off in reverse order of seniority unless this would reduce the percentage of minority teachers was collectively agreed. Held, under strict scrutiny, the preference was unlawful under the Fourteenth Amendment because it was not based on evidence of past discrimination. Marshall J, joined by Brennan J, Blackmun J, Stevens J dissented
- US v. Paradise 480 US 149 (1987) a judicially ordered preference to remedy longstanding discrimination in the Alabama Department of Public Safety hiring and promotion of state troopers was lawful.
- City of Richmond v. J.A. Croson Co., 488 US 469 (1989) 6 to 3, government contracting according to diversity criteria unlawful. Race preference is subject to strict scrutiny, or more difficult to justify than other remedies for discrimination.
- Adarand Constructors, Inc. v. Peña, 515 US 200 (1995) federal agency contracts and subcontracts
- Piscataway School Board v. Taxman, 91 F3d 1547 (3d Cir. 1996) case dropped, on affirmative action
- Morton v. Mancari 417 US 535 (1974) held preference of Native Americans in the Bureau of Indian Affairs was compatible with Title VII and the Fifth Amendment, as it was "reasonably designed to further the cause of Indian self-government and to make the BIA more responsive to the needs of its constituent groups."
- EEOC, Guidelines on Affirmative Action (2009) 29 CFR §1608
- OFCCP Regulations, 41 CFR §60 based on Executive Order 11246, 3 CFR 339

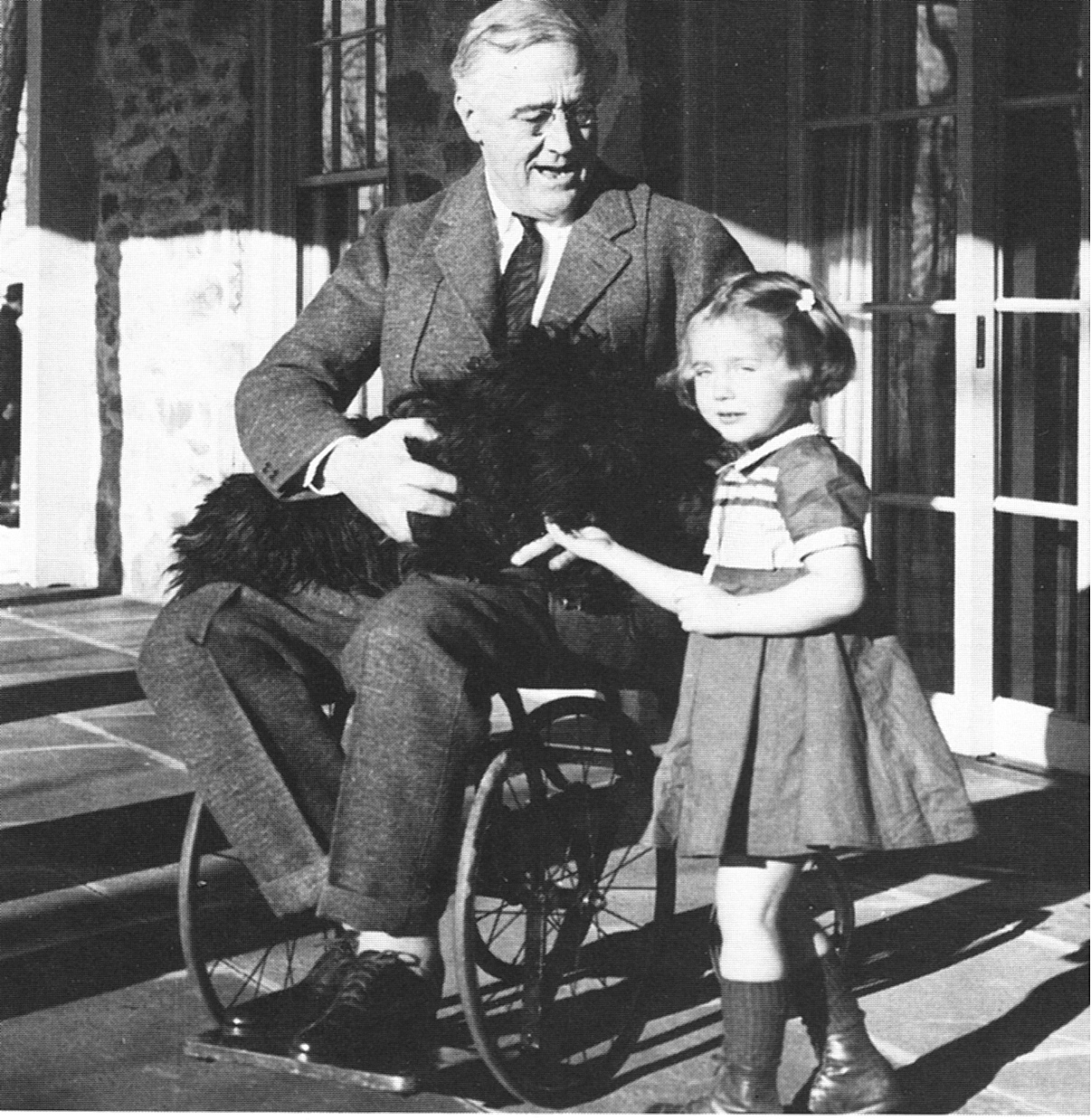
Franklin Delano Roosevelt, suffering from polio, required a wheelchair through his Presidency.

- Veterans' Preference Act of 1944
- Rehabilitation Act of 1973, 29 USC §§705, 791–794e
- Borkowski v. Valley Central School District 63 F3d 131 (2nd 1995) burden of proof
- Vande Zande v. Wisconsin Department of Administration 44 F3d 538 (7th 1995)
- Southeastern Community College v. Davis 442 US 397 (1979) a duty of reasonable accommodation did not apparently amount to a duty of affirmative action under §§501–3
- Americans with Disabilities Act of 1990, 42 USC §§12101–12213
- Cleveland v. Policy Management Systems Corp 562 US 795 (1999)
- Sutton v. United Airline, Inc 527 US 471 (1999)
- Albertsons, Inc. v. Kirkingburg 527 US 555 (1999)
- Murphy v. United Parcel Service 527 US 516 (1999)
- Toyota Motor Manufacturing, Kentucky, Inc. v. Williams 534 US 184 (2002)
- US Airways Inc v. Barnett 535 US 391 (2002) bad back, request for transfer against seniority system. Breyer J saying that (apparently) seniority systems "encourage employees to invest in the employing company, accepting 'less than their value to the firm early in their careers' in return for greater benefits in later years."
- New York City Transit Authority v. Beazer 440 U.S. 568 (1979) Civil Rights Act of 1964, legality of discrimination against methadone users
- Family and Medical Leave Act of 1993, Equality Act of 2015

=== Free movement and immigration ===
- Corfield v. Coryell, 6 Fed. Cas. 546 (1823)
- Paul v. Virginia, 75 U.S. 168 (1869)
- Hoffman Plastic Compounds, Inc. v. NLRB, 535 U.S. 137 (2002) 5 to 4, an immigrant worker, who had arrived without permission, denied effective rights under the NLRA 1935 for helping in union organizing.
- History of immigration to the United States
- Immigration Reform and Control Act of 1986, 8 USC §1324b and §1324a "unlawful employment of aliens"
- Illegal immigration to the United States
- Comprehensive Immigration Reform Act of 2007

== Job security ==
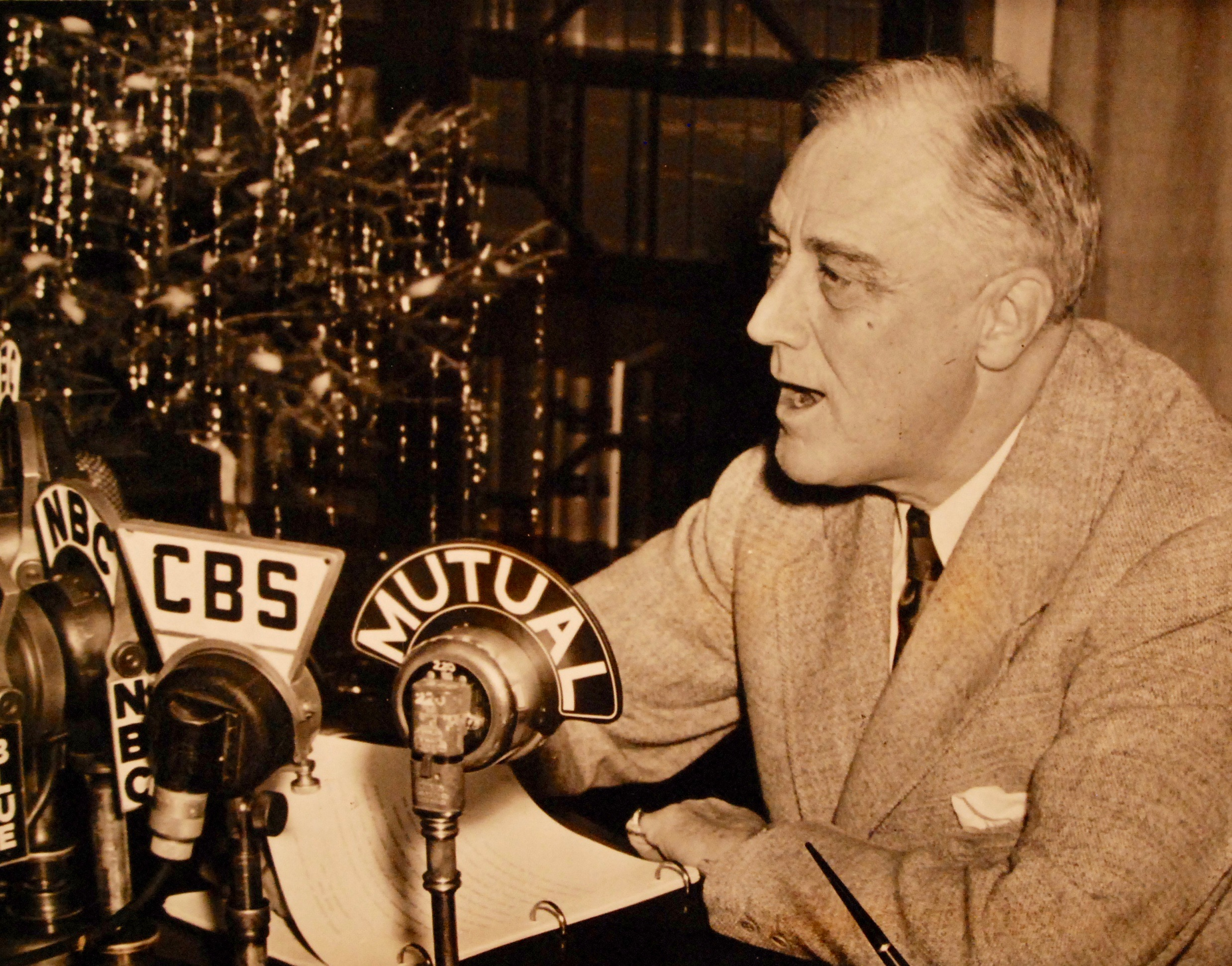
President Franklin D. Roosevelt brought unemployment down from over 20% to under 2%, with the New Deal's investment in jobs during the Great Depression.

Job security laws in the United States are the weakest in the developed world, as there are no federal statutory rights yet. Any employment contract can require job security, but employees other than corporate executives or managers rarely have the bargaining power to contract for job security. Collective agreements often aim to ensure that employees can only be terminated for a "just cause", but the vast majority of Americans have no protection other than the rules at common law. Most states follow a rule that an employee can be terminated "at will" by the employer: for a "good reason, a bad reason, or no reason at all", so long as no statutory rule is violated. Most states have public policy exceptions to ensure that an employee's discharge does not frustrate the purpose of statutory rights. Although the Lloyd–La Follette Act of 1912 required that federal civil servants cannot be dismissed except for a "just cause", no federal or state law (outside Montana) protects all employees yet. There are now a growing number of proposals to do this. There are no rights to be given reasonable notice before termination, apart from whatever is stated in a contract or collective agreement, and no requirements for severance pay if an employer lays off employees for economic reasons. The only exception is that the Worker Adjustment and Retraining Notification Act of 1988 requires 60 days notice is given if a business with over 100 employees lays off over 33% of its workforce or over 500 people. While a minority of theorists defend at will employment on the ground that it protects liberty and economic efficiency, the empirical evidence suggests that job insecurity hampers innovation, reduces productivity, worsens economic recessions, deprives employees of liberty and pay, and creates a culture of fear. US unemployment has historically been extremely volatile, as Republican presidents have consistently increased post-war unemployment, while Democratic presidents have reduced it. In its conduct of monetary policy, it is the duty of the Federal Reserve to achieve "maximum employment", although in reality Federal Reserve chairs prioritize the reducing of inflation. Underemployment from growing insecurity of working hours has risen. Government may also use fiscal policy (by taxing or borrowing and spending) to achieve full employment, but as unemployment affects the power of workers, and wages, this remains highly political.

=== Termination and cause ===
The reasons or "causes" that an employer can give to terminate employment affect everything from people's income, to the ability to pay the rent, to getting health insurance. Despite this, the legal right to have one's job terminated only for a "just cause" is confined to just three groups of people. First, in the Lloyd–La Follette Act of 1912 Congress codified executive orders giving federal civil servants the right to have their jobs terminated "only for such cause as will promote the efficiency of the service." Second, in the mid 20th century, courts in New York developed a rule that corporate directors could only be dismissed for a "just cause", requiring reasons related to the director's conduct, competence, or some economic justification. Third, since 1987, Montana has enacted a "wrongful discharge" law, giving employees the right to damages if "discharge was not for good cause and the employee had completed the employer's probationary period of employment", with a standard probation set at 6 months work. However a right to reasons before termination has never been extended to ordinary employees outside Montana. By contrast, almost all other developed countries have legislation requiring just cause in termination. The standard in the International Labour Organization Termination of Employment Convention, 1982 requires a "valid reason" for termination of a worker contract based on "capacity or conduct" and prohibits reasons related to union membership, being a worker representative, or a protected characteristic (e.g. race, gender, etc.). It also requires reasonable notice, a fair procedure, and a severance allowance if the termination is for economic reasons. Some countries such as Germany also require that elected work councils have the power to veto or delay terminations, to neutralize the employer's potential conflicts of interest. Most countries treat job security as a fundamental right, as well as necessary to prevent irrational job losses, to reduce unemployment, and to promote innovation. An alternative view is that making it easier to fire people encourages employers to hire more people because they will not fear the costs of litigation, although the empirical credibility of this argument is doubted by a majority of scholars.

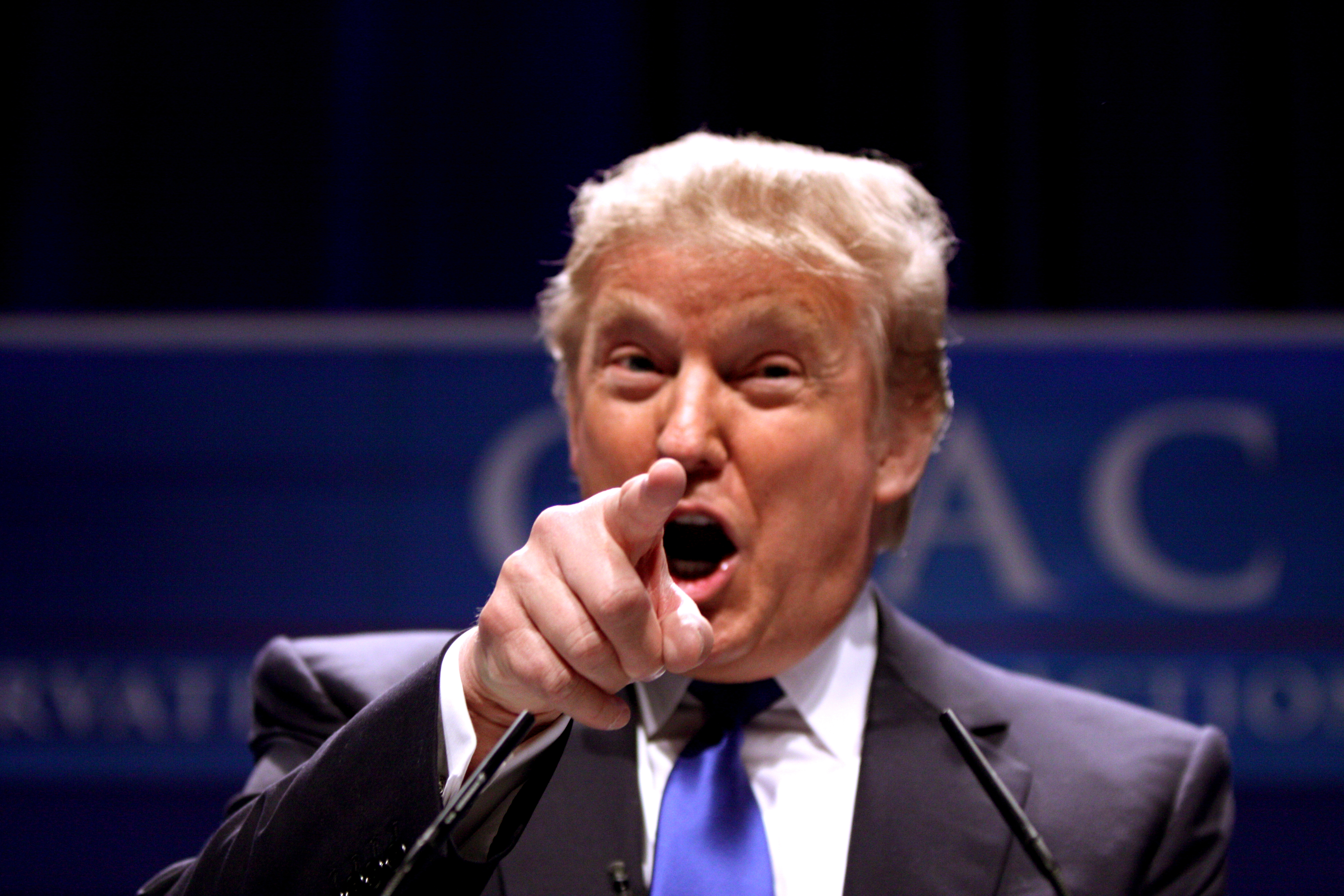
The slogan "you're fired!" was popularized by Donald Trump's TV show, The Apprentice before he became president. This reflects the "at-will employment" doctrine that deprives employees of job security, and lets people become unemployed for arbitrary reasons.

Because most states have not yet enacted proposals for job security rights, the default rule is known as "at-will employment". For example, in 1872, the California Civil Code was written to say "employment having no specified term may be terminated at the will of either party", and even employment for a specified term could be terminated by the employer for a wilful breach, neglect of duty or the employee's incapacity. In the late 19th century, employment at will was popularized by academic writers as an inflexible legal presumption, and state courts began to adopt it, even though many had presumed that contract termination usually required notice and justifications. By the mid-20th century this was summed up to say that an employee's job could be terminated for a "good reason, a bad reason, or no reason at all". However, the employer's discretion to terminate could not violate any statutory prohibition, including termination for union membership, discriminatory termination based on a protected characteristic (e.g. race, gender, age or disability), and bringing claims for occupational health and safety, fair labor standards, retirement income, family and medical leave, and under a series of other specific Acts. Many state courts also added at least four "public policy" exceptions, to ensure that the purpose of statutes in general would not be frustrated by firing. First, employees will be wrongfully discharged if are discharged after they refused to act unlawfully, for instance for refusing to perjure themselves in court. Second, employees cannot be terminated if they insist on performing public duties such as serving on a jury or responding to a subpoena even if this affects an employer's business. Third, an employee cannot be discharged for exercising any statutory right, such as refusing to take a lie detector test or filing litigation. Fourth, employees will be wrongfully discharged if they legitimately blow the whistle on unlawful employer conduct, such as violating food labelling laws, or reporting unlawful standards in a nursing home. However none of these exceptions limit the central problem of terminations by an employer that are unrelated to an employee's conduct, capability, or business efficiency. Some states interpret the general duty of good faith in contracts to cover discharges, so that an employee cannot, for example, be terminated just before a bonus is due to be paid. However the vast majority of Americans remain unprotected against most arbitrary, irrational or malicious conduct by employers.

Despite the default, and absence of job security rights in statute, a contract may require reasons before dismissal as a matter of construction. When there is a "just cause" term in a contract, courts generally interpret this to enable termination for an employee's inadequate job performance after fair warning, and job-related misconduct where the employer consistently enforces a rule, but not actions outside of the job. An employee's job may be constructively and wrongfully terminated if an employer's behavior objectively shows it no longer wishes to be bound by the contract, for instance by unfairly depriving an employee of responsibility. If a written contract does not promise "just cause" protection against termination, statements in a handbook can still be enforceable, and oral agreements can override the written contract.

=== Economic layoffs ===
Many job terminations in America are economic layoffs, where employers believe that employees are redundant. In most countries, economic layoffs are separately regulated because of the conflicts of interest between workers, management and shareholders, and the risk that workers are discharged to boost profits even if this damages the long-term sustainability of enterprise. The ILO Termination of Employment Convention, 1982 requires a severance allowance if the termination is for economic reasons, as well as consultation with worker representatives about ways to avoid layoffs. Most developed countries regard information and consultation in the event of any economic change as a fundamental right. The United States government also helped write Control Council Law No 22 for post-war Germany which enabled unions to collectively bargain for elected work councils, which would have the right to participate in decisions about dismissals. However, there are no state or federal laws requiring severance pay or employee participation in layoff decisions. Where employment contracts or collective agreements contain "just cause" provisions, these have been interpreted to give employers broad discretion, and immunity from the social consequences for the laid off workforce.

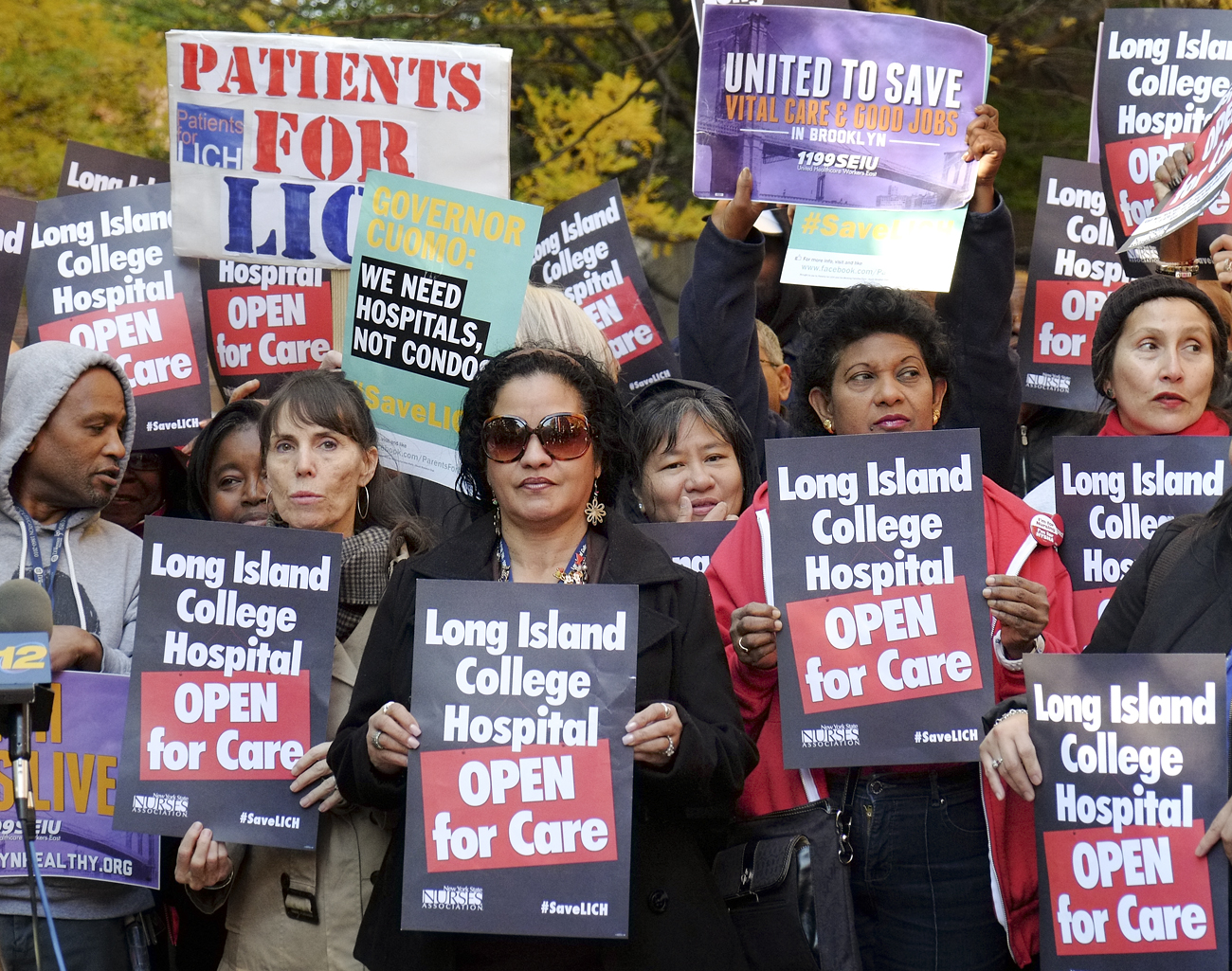
American workers do not yet have a right to vote on employer layoff decisions, even though the US government helped draft laws for other countries to have elected work councils.

The only statutory right for employees is for extreme cases of mass layoffs under the Worker Adjustment and Retraining Notification Act of 1988. The WARN Act regulates any "plant closing" where there is an "employment loss" of 33% of employees if that is over 50 employees, or any case of over 500 employee layoffs, and the business employs 100 persons or more. In these cases, employers have to give 60 days notice to employee representatives such as a union, or to each employee if they have none, and the State. Employment loss is defined to include reduction of over 50% of working time, but exclude cases where an employee is offered a suitable alternative job within reasonable commuting distance. Despite the absence of any duty to consult, employers can argue three main defenses for failure to give notice of mass layoff. First, an employer can argue that they believed in good faith that less notice was necessary to improve chances of a capital injection. Second, an employer may argue that business circumstances were unforeseen. Third, an employer can argue it had reasonable grounds for believing its failure was not a violation of the act. The only remedies are pay that would have been due in the notice period, and a $500 a day penalty to the local governments that were not notified. States such as Massachusetts, Connecticut and Maine have statutes with slightly but more stringent notice requirements, but none yet require real voice for employees before facing economic hardship.

A common cause of layoffs is that businesses are merged or taken over, either through stock market acquisitions or private equity transactions, where new managements want to fire parts of the workforce to augment profits for shareholders. Outside limited defenses in corporate law, this issue is largely unregulated. However, if an employer is under a duty to bargain in good faith with a union, and its business is transferred, there will be a duty on the successor employer to continue bargaining if it has retained a substantial number of the previous workforce. This was not made out in the leading case, Howard Johnson Co. v. Detroit Local Joint Executive Board, where the new owner of a restaurant and motor lodge business retained 9 out of 53 former employees, but hired 45 new staff of its own. The majority held there must be "substantial continuity of identity" of the business for the good faith bargaining duty to continue.

=== Full employment ===
The right to full employment or the "right to work" in a fair paying job is a universal human right in international law, partly inspired by the experience of the New Deal in the 1930s. Unemployment has, however, remained politically divisive because it affects the distribution of wealth and power. When there is full employment under 2%, and everyone can easily find new jobs, worker bargaining power tends to be higher and pay tends to rise, but high unemployment tends to reduce worker power and pay, and may increase shareholder profit. It was long acknowledged that the law should ensure nobody is denied a job by unreasonable restrictions by the state or private parties, and the Supreme Court said in Truax v. Raich that "the right to work for a living in the common occupations of the community is of the very essence of the personal freedom and opportunity". During the New Deal with unemployment having reached 20% after the Wall Street Crash of 1929, the Emergency Relief Appropriation Act of 1935 empowered the President to create the Works Progress Administration, which aimed to directly employ people on fair wages. By 1938, the WPA employed 3.33 million people, and built streets, bridges and buildings across the country. Also created by the 1935 Act, the Rural Electrification Administration brought electrification of farms from 11% in 1934 to 50% by 1942, and nearly 100% by 1949. After war production brought full employment, the WPA was wound up in 1943.

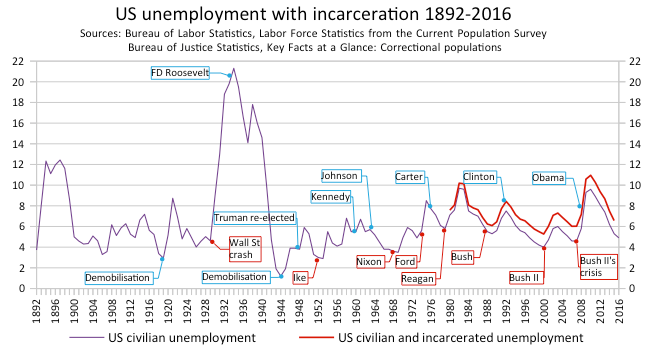
Unemployment since World War I has been lower under Democratic presidents and higher under Republican presidents. The high rate of incarceration raised real unemployment by around 1.5% since 1980.

After World War II, the Employment Act of 1946 declared a policy of Congress to "promote full employment and production, increased real income... and reasonable price stability". However the Act did not follow the original proposal to say "all Americans... are entitled to an opportunity for useful, remunerative, regular, and full-time employment". By the 1970s, there was a growing opinion that the Equal Protection Clause itself in the 14th Amendment should also mean, according to Justice Marshall in Board of Regents of State Colleges v. Roth, that "every citizen who applies for a government job is entitled to it unless the government can establish some reason for denying the employment." The Humphrey–Hawkins Full Employment Act of 1978 was passed and enabled the President to create jobs to maintain full employment: it stated "the President shall, as may be authorized by law, establish reservoirs of public employment and private nonprofit employment projects". The Act sets the goal of federal government to ensure unemployment is below "3 per centum among individuals aged twenty and over" with inflation also under 3 per cent. It includes "policy priorities" of the "development of energy sources and supplies, transportation, and environmental improvement". These powers of a job guarantee, full employment, and environmental improvement have not yet been used. During the 2008 financial crisis, the American Recovery and Reinvestment Act of 2009 was passed to enable more spending, but not a job guarantee.

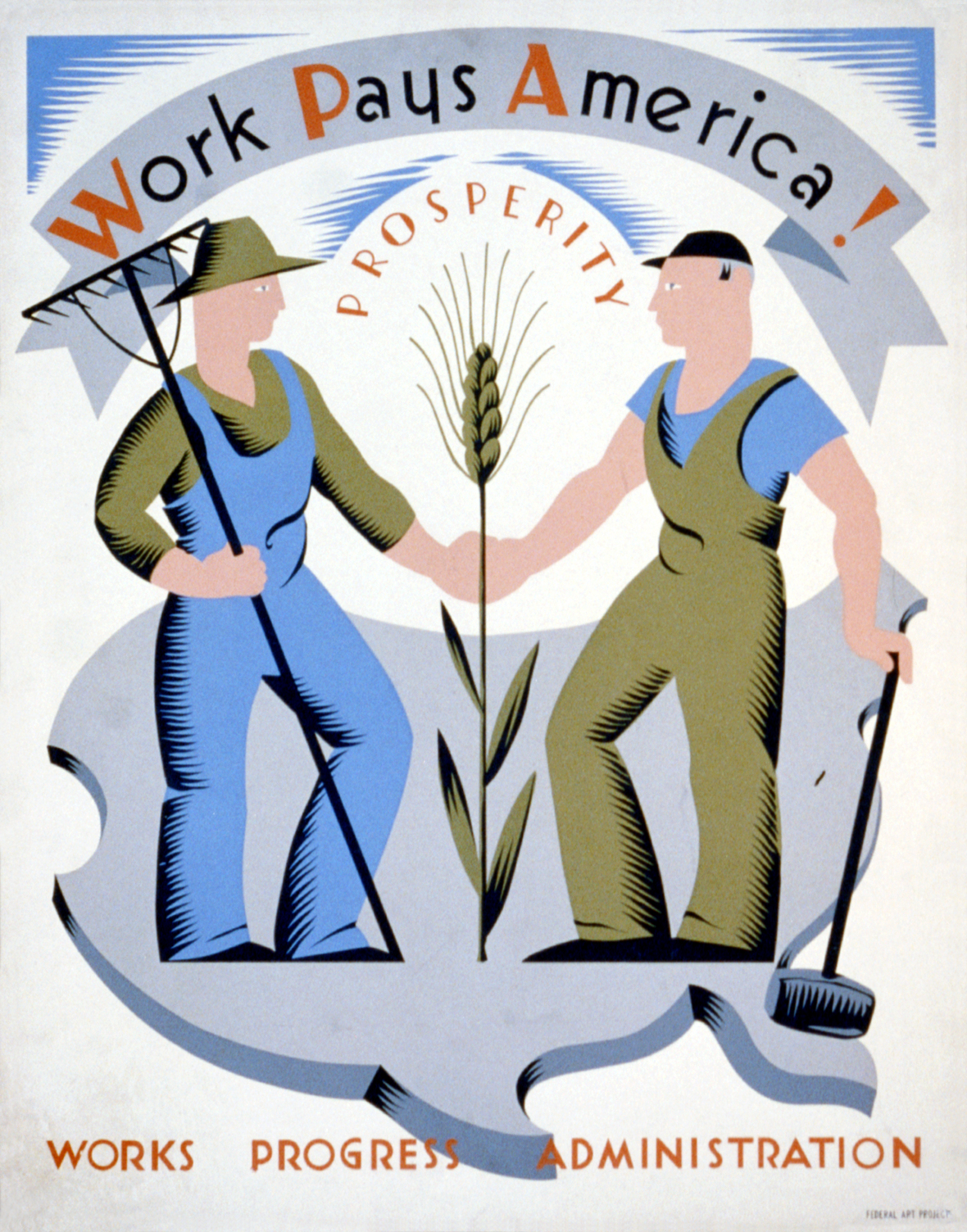
The Works Progress Administration from 1935 to 1943 created 8.5m jobs spending $1.3bn a year to get out of the Great Depression.

While the laws for a federal or state job guarantee have not yet been used, the Federal Reserve Act 1913 does require that the Board of Governors of the Federal Reserve System should use its powers "to promote effectively the goals of maximum employment, stable prices, and moderate long-term interest rates." During the Great Depression it was understood that inequality in the distribution of wealth had contributed to the lack of employment, and that Federal lending policy and bank regulation should pursue a range of objectives. However, the Federal Reserve became dominated by a theory of a natural rate of unemployment, taking the view that attempts to achieve full employment would accelerate inflation to an uncontrollably high. Instead it was said by theorists such as Milton Friedman that central banks should use monetary policy only to control inflation, according to the non-accelerating inflation rate of unemployment (NAIRU). It is doubted that any natural rate of unemployment exists, because the United States and other countries have sustained full employment with low inflation before, and the US unemployment rate follows which political party is in the White House.

... my friends, after this war, there will be a great unemployment problem. The munition plants will be closed and useless, and millions of munitions workers will be thrown out upon the market... First they ignore you. Then they ridicule you. And then they attack you and want to burn you. And then they build monuments to you. And that is what is going to happen to the Amalgamated Clothing Workers of America. And I say, courage to the strikers, and courage to the delegates, because great times are coming, stressful days are here, and I hope your hearts will be strong, and I hope you will be one hundred per cent union when it comes!

— Nicholas Klein, Biennial Convention of the Amalgamated Clothing Workers of America (1918)

If despite fiscal and monetary policy people are unemployed, the Social Security Act of 1935 creates unemployment insurance. One of its goals is to stabilize employment by encouraging employers to retain workers in downturns. Unlike other systems, this makes social security highly dependent on employers. It is funded through a federal payroll tax, and employers that make more layoffs pay higher rates based on past experience. A laid off employee brings a claim to state unemployment office, the former employer is informed and may contest whether the employee was laid off fairly: they are given absolute privilege to communicate information regardless of how false or defamatory it is. Employees cannot get benefits if they are laid off for misconduct, and for participation in strikes, even though the reality may be the employer's fault and there are no other jobs available. Social security claimants must also accept any suitable job. Unemployment offices usually provide facilities for claimants to search for work, but many also turn to private employment agencies. The Supreme Court has held that licensing, fees and regulation of employment agencies under state law is constitutional.

=== Trade and international law ===
[The International Labour Organization ...] has for its object the establishment of universal peace, and such a peace can be established only if it is based upon social justice ... conditions of labor exist involving such injustice, hardship, and privation to large numbers of people ... and an improvement of those conditions is urgently required: as, for example, by ... a maximum working day and week, the regulation of the labor supply, the prevention of unemployment, the provision of an adequate living wage, the protection of the worker against sickness, disease and injury arising out of his employment, the protection of children, young persons and women, provision for old age and injury, protection of the interests of workers when employed in countries other than their own, recognition of the principle of freedom of association, the organization of vocational and technical education ...

— Versailles Treaty of 1919 Part XIII
- US Constitution, Article I, Section 8, Clause 3, Congress has the power: "To regulate Commerce with foreign Nations, and among the several States, and with the Indian Tribes." Article IV, Section 2, Clause 1, "The Citizens of each State shall be entitled to all Privileges and Immunities of Citizens in the several States."
- Freedom of movement under United States law
- Gibbons v. Ogden, 22 US 1 (1824) and Paul v. Virginia, 75 US 168 (1869)
- Interstate Commerce Act of 1887 and Federal Trade Commission Act of 1914
- International Labour Organization and international labor standards
- Bargaining power, race to the bottom, foreign direct investment, human development, technological change, global workforce, immigration
- Tariff Act of 1890, Smoot–Hawley Tariff Act of 1930, Great Depression
- United States free trade agreements, United States International Trade Commission, 19 USC

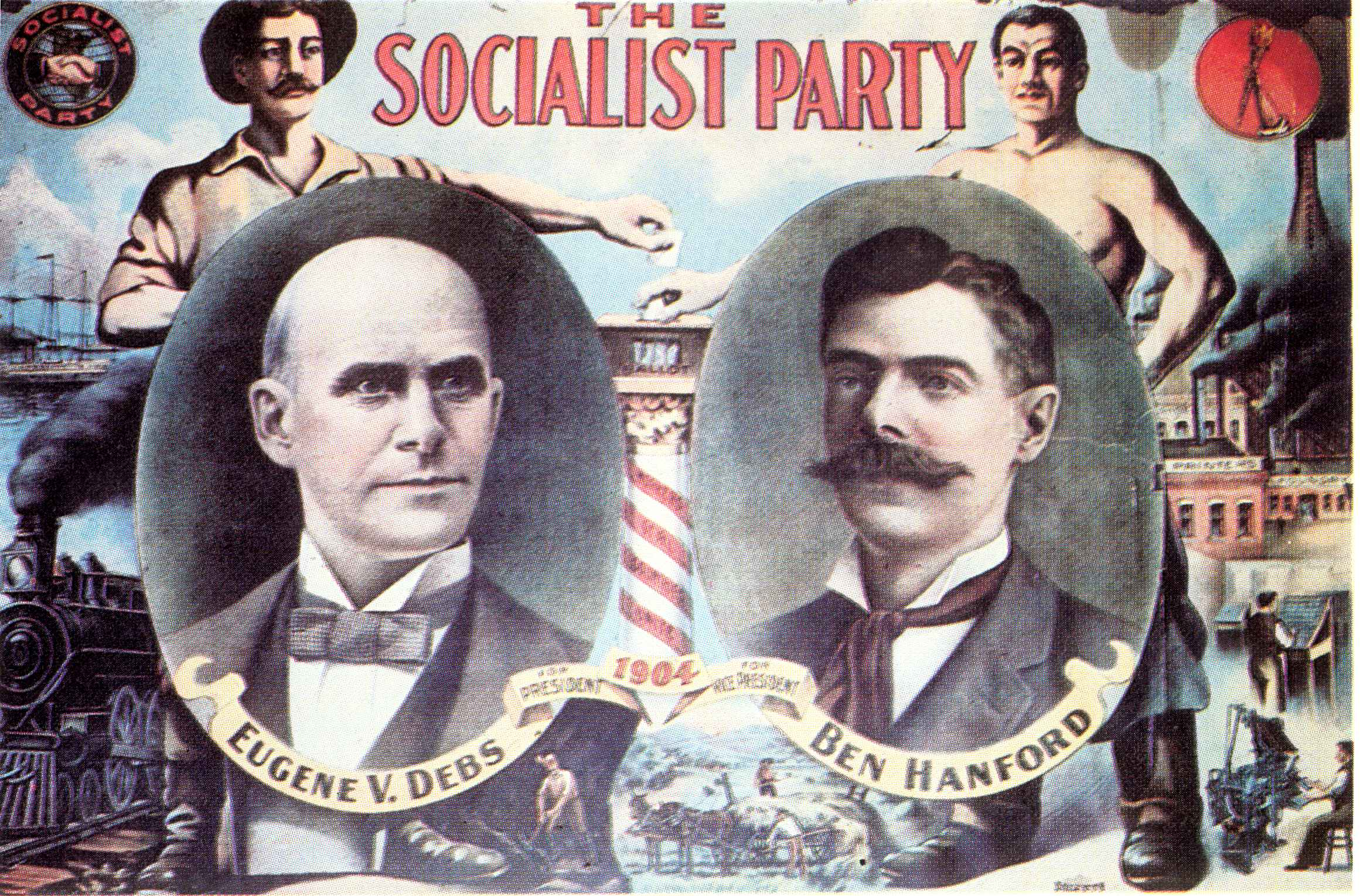
Eugene V. Debs, founder of the American Railway Union and five-time presidential candidate, was jailed twice for organizing the Pullman Strike and denouncing World War I. His life story is told in a documentary by Bernie Sanders.

- Trade Act of 1974, Trade Agreements Act of 1979, Trade Act of 2002, Trade Preferences Extension Act of 2015 and Fast track (trade)
- North American Free Trade Agreement, 19 USC ch 21, §3301
- World Trade Organization and Uruguay Round Agreements Act of 1994
- Permanent normal trade relations
- Trans-Pacific Partnership and Transatlantic Trade and Investment Partnership
- Three potential views are:
  - (1) expansion of trade is good because it increases the scope for division of labor and expanding markets. So, all customs, taxes, and equivalent restrictions against market access should be dismantled
  - (2) free trade is bad because it exacerbates labor's inequality of bargaining power against global capital. Trade should be limited and regulated by systems of taxes and tariffs according to the state of other countries' development
  - (3) trade, without barriers to movement of capital, goods and services, improves living standards if labor standards are improved in all countries. This (a) discourages emigration from poorer countries: as people's lives improve they may not want to leave (b) requires standards are improved at a rate to ensure stability in capital and labor flows (c) in turn requires that standard should not enable workers to be paid less than is necessary for human development and the workers' rate of productivity.

== Labor law in individual states ==
=== California ===
In 1959, California added the Division of Fair Employment Practices to the California Department of Industrial Relations. The Fair Employment and Housing Act of 1980 gave the division its own Department of Fair Employment and Housing, with the stated purpose of protecting citizens against harassment and employment discrimination on the basis of: age, ancestry, color, creed, denial of family and medical care leave, disability (including HIV/AIDS), marital status, medical condition, national origin, race, religion, sex, transgender status and sexual orientation. Sexual orientation was not specifically included in the original law but precedent was established based on case law. On October 9, 2011, California Governor Edmund G. "Jerry" Brown signed into law Assembly Bill No. 887 alters the meaning of gender for the purposes of discrimination laws that define sex as including gender so that California law now prohibits discrimination on the basis of gender identity and gender expression.

The state also has its own labor law covering agricultural workers, the California Agricultural Labor Relations Act.

=== New Jersey ===
In 1945, New Jersey enacted the first statewide civil rights act in the entire nation. with the purpose of protecting citizens against harassment and employment discrimination on the basis of: race, creed, color, national origin, nationality, or ancestry. This has since been expanded to age, sex, disability, pregnancy, sexual orientation, perceived sexual orientation, marital status, civil union status, domestic partnership status, affectional orientation, gender identity or expression, genetic information, military service, or mental or physical disability, AIDS and HIV related illnesses and atypical hereditary cellular or blood traits.

New Jersey's Law Against Discrimination (LAD) requires employers to provide reasonable accommodations to pregnant and postpartum employees, regardless of company size or how long the employee has worked there. The LAD also covers lactation-related needs, having added breastfeeding as a protected characteristic in 2018. Because New Jersey's law applies to employers of any size, it can offer broader protection than the federal Pregnant Workers Fairness Act, which only covers employers with 15 or more employees.

=== Laws restricting unions ===
Right-to-work states Statewide Right-to-work law Local Right-to-work laws No Right-to-work law

As of 2019, twenty-six states plus Guam prevent trade unions from signing collective agreements with employers requiring employees pay fees to the union when they are not members (frequently called "right-to-work" laws by their political proponents).

In 2010, the organization "Save Our Secret Ballot" pushed four states: Arizona, South Carolina, South Dakota, and Utah to pass constitutional amendments to ban card check.

== Enforcement of rights ==
- United States Department of Labor
- National Labor Relations Board
- Ford Motor Co. v. NLRB, 305 U.S. 364 (1939) the right of the NLRB to withdraw its submissions to the Court were at the court's discretion
- In re NLRB, 304 U.S. 486 (1938) to enforce an order, the NLRB must file a petition and transcript with the courts
- Equal Employment Opportunity Commission
- Elgin v. Department of Treasury, 567 U.S. ___ (2012) 6 to 3, under the Civil Service Reform Act of 1978 federal employees have no recourse to the federal courts over wrongful discharge cases, but must instead go to the Merit Systems Protection Board.
- United Mine Workers of America v. Gibbs, 383 U.S. 715 (1966) state and federal jurisdiction in labor disputes

== See also ==
- Labor law
- European labour law
- UK labour law
- Right to sit in the United States
- Social law
- Child labor laws in the United States

Organizations

- American Rights at Work, a charity supporting union rights
- Congress of Industrial Organizations
- International Society for Labor Law and Social Security
- National Labor Federation, an organization supporting workers outside the protection of federal labor laws
- United States Department of Labor, includes a list of labor legislation
