= Building & Construction Trades Council v. Associated Builders & Contractors of Massachusetts/Rhode Island, Inc. =

- Supreme Court of the United States

Argued December 9, 1992 Decided March 8, 1993
- Full case name: Building & Construction Trades Council v. Associated Builders & Contractors of Massachusetts/Rhode Island, Inc.
- Citations: 507 U.S. 218 (more) 113 S. Ct. 1190; 122 L. Ed. 2d 565

Case history
- Prior: 935 F.2d 345 (1st Cir. 1991); cert. granted, 504 U.S. 908 (1992).

Holding
- State governments may use their funds to procure corporations to do work that are union or labor friendly.

Court membership
- Chief Justice William Rehnquist Associate Justices Byron White · Harry Blackmun; John P. Stevens · Sandra Day O'Connor; Antonin Scalia · Anthony Kennedy; David Souter · Clarence Thomas

Case opinion
- Majority: Blackmun, joined by unanimous

Building & Construction Trades Council v. Associated Builders & Contractors of Massachusetts/Rhode Island, Inc., 507 U.S. 218 (1993), is a US labor law case, concerning the scope of federal preemption against state law for labor rights.

== Facts ==
A corporation claimed that it should not have to abide by a contract it signed with a state government body, to abide by terms of a collective agreement because it was preempted by the National Labor Relations Act of 1935. The Massachusetts Water Resources Authority, a state government body, was ordered to clean up pollution of Boston Harbor after it failed to prevent sewage flowing in. It commissioned Kaiser Engineers, Inc. for the cleanup, and made it agree that it would assure labor stability, and abide by a collective agreement with the Building and Construction Trades Council. Kaiser Inc and the employer lobby then claimed that this agreement was pre-empted under the National Labor Relations Act. The District Court rejected the claim. The Court of Appeals allowed the claim, saying that the labor agreement, as a condition of carrying out work, was an intrusion into the bargaining process and not the sort of peripheral regulation permissible under San Diego Building Trades Council v. Garmon. and Machinists v. Wisconsin Employment Relations Comm'n. The MWRA appealed.

== Judgment ==
The Supreme Court held state governments may use their funds to procure corporations to do work that are union or labor friendly. Blackmun J gave the judgment of the Court.

The NLRA contains no express pre-emption provision. Therefore, in accordance with settled pre-emption principles, we should not find MWRA's bid specification pre-empted "'". . . unless it conflicts with federal law or would frustrate the federal scheme, or unless [we] discern from the totality of the circumstances that Congress sought to occupy the field to the exclusion of the States."'" ... We are reluctant to infer pre-emption....

[...]

When we say that the NLRA pre-empts state law, we mean that the NLRA prevents a State from regulating within a protected zone, whether it be a zone protected and reserved for market freedom, see Machinists, or for NLRB jurisdiction, see Garmon. A State does not regulate, however, simply by acting within one of these protected areas. When a State owns and manages property, for example, it must interact with private participants in the marketplace. In so doing, the State is not subject to pre-emption by the NLRA, because pre-emption doctrines apply only to state regulation.

Our decisions in this area support the distinction between government as regulator and government as proprietor. We have held consistently that the NLRA was intended to supplant state labor regulation, not all legitimate state activity that affects labor. In Machinists, for example, we referred to Congress' pre-emptive intent to "leave some activities unregulated," 427 U.S., at 144, 96 S.Ct., at 2555 (emphasis added), and held that the activities at issue—workers deciding together to refuse overtime work—were not "regulable by States." Id., at 149, 96 S.Ct., at 2557 (emphasis added). In Golden State I, we held that the reason Los Angeles could not condition renewal of a taxicab franchise upon settlement of a labor dispute was that "Machinists pre-emption . . . precludes state and municipal regulation 'concerning conduct that Congress intended to be unregulated.' " 475 U.S., at 614, 106 S.Ct., at 1398 (emphasis added) (quoting Metropolitan Life Ins. Co. v. Massachusetts, 471 U.S., at 749, 105 S.Ct., at 2394). We refused to permit the city's exercise of its regulatory power of license nonrenewal to restrict Golden State's right to use lawful economic weapons in its dispute with its union. See 475 U.S., at 615-619, 106 S.Ct., at 1398-1401. As petitioners point out, a very different case would have been presented had the city of Los Angeles purchased taxi services from Golden State in order to transport city employees. Brief for Petitioners 35. In that situation, if the strike had produced serious interruptions in the services the city had purchased, the city would not necessarily have been pre-empted from advising Golden State that it would hire another company if the labor dispute were not resolved and services resumed by a specific deadline.

[...]

The conceptual distinction between regulator and purchaser exists to a limited extent in the private sphere as well. A private actor, for example, can participate in a boycott of a supplier on the basis of a labor policy concern rather than a profit motive. See id., at 290, 106 S.Ct., at 1063. The private actor under such circumstances would be attempting to "regulate" the suppliers and would not be acting as a typical proprietor. The fact that a private actor may "regulate" does not mean, of course, that the private actor may be "pre-empted" by the NLRA; the Supremacy Clause does not require pre-emption of private conduct. Private actors therefore may "regulate" as they please, as long as their conduct does not violate the law. As the above passage in Gould makes clear, however, States have a qualitatively different role to play from private parties. Id., at 290, 106 S.Ct., at 1063. When the State acts as regulator, it performs a role that is characteristically a governmental rather than a private role, boycotts notwithstanding. Moreover, as regulator of private conduct, the State is more powerful than private parties. These distinctions are far less significant when the State acts as a market participant with no interest in setting policy.

[...]

Permitting the States to participate freely in the marketplace is not only consistent with NLRA pre-emption principles generally but also, in this case, promotes the legislative goals that animated the passage of the §§ 8(e) and 8(f) exceptions for the construction industry. In 1959, Congress amended the NLRA to add § 8(f) and modify § 8(e). Section 8(f) explicitly permits employers in the construction industry—but no other employers—to enter into prehire agreements. Prehire agreements are collective-bargaining agreements providing for union recognition, compulsory union dues or equivalents, and mandatory use of union hiring halls, prior to the hiring of any employees.

[...]

It is undisputed that the Agreement between Kaiser and BCTC is a valid labor contract under §§ 8(e) and (f). As noted above, those sections explicitly authorize this type of contract between a union and an employer like Kaiser, which is engaged primarily in the construction industry, covering employees engaged in that industry.

[...]

In the instant case, MWRA acted on the advice of a manager hired to organize performance of a clean-up job over which, under Massachusetts law, MWRA is the proprietor. There is no question but that MWRA was attempting to ensure an efficient project that would be completed as quickly and effectively as possible at the lowest cost. As petitioners note, moreover, Brief for Petitioners 26, the challenged action in this case was specifically tailored to one particular job, the Boston Harbor clean-up project. There is therefore no basis on which to distinguish the incentives at work here from those that operate elsewhere in the construction industry, incentives that this Court has recognized as legitimate. See Woelke & Romero Framing Co. v. NLRB, 456 U.S., at 662, and n. 14, 102 S.Ct., at 2081, and n. 14.

We hold today that Bid Specification 13.1 is not government regulation and that it is therefore subject to neither Garmon nor Machinists pre-emption. Bid Specification 13.1 constitutes proprietary conduct on the part of the Commonwealth of Massachusetts, which legally has enforced a valid project labor agreement. As Chief Judge Breyer aptly noted in his dissent in the Court of Appeals, "when the MWRA, acting in the role of purchaser of construction services, acts just like a private contractor would act, and conditions its purchasing upon the very sort of labor agreement that Congress explicitly authorized and expected frequently to find, it does not 'regulate' the workings of the market forces that Congress expected to find; it exemplifies them." 935 F.2d, at 361...

== See also ==
- United States labor law
