= Chamber of Commerce v. Brown =

- Supreme Court of the United States

Argued March 19, 2008 Decided June 19, 2008
- Full case name: Chamber of Commerce of the United States of America, et al., Petitioners v. Edmund G. Brown, Jr., Attorney General of California, et al.
- Citations: 554 U.S. 60 (more) 128 S. Ct. 2408; 171 L. Ed. 2d 264

Case history
- Prior: Chamber of Commerce v. Lockyer, 463 F.3d 1076 (9th Cir. 2006); cert. granted, 552 U.S. 1035 (2007).

Holding
- The NLRA preempts state labor regulations of noncoercive speech created on the theory that noncoercive speech interferes with employees' right to join a union because the NLRA takes the opposite policy position.

Court membership
- Chief Justice John Roberts Associate Justices John P. Stevens · Antonin Scalia; Anthony Kennedy · David Souter; Clarence Thomas · Ruth Bader Ginsburg; Stephen Breyer · Samuel Alito

Case opinions
- Majority: Stevens, joined by Roberts, Scalia, Kennedy, Souter, Thomas, Alito
- Dissent: Breyer, joined by Ginsburg

Laws applied
- National Labor Relations Act

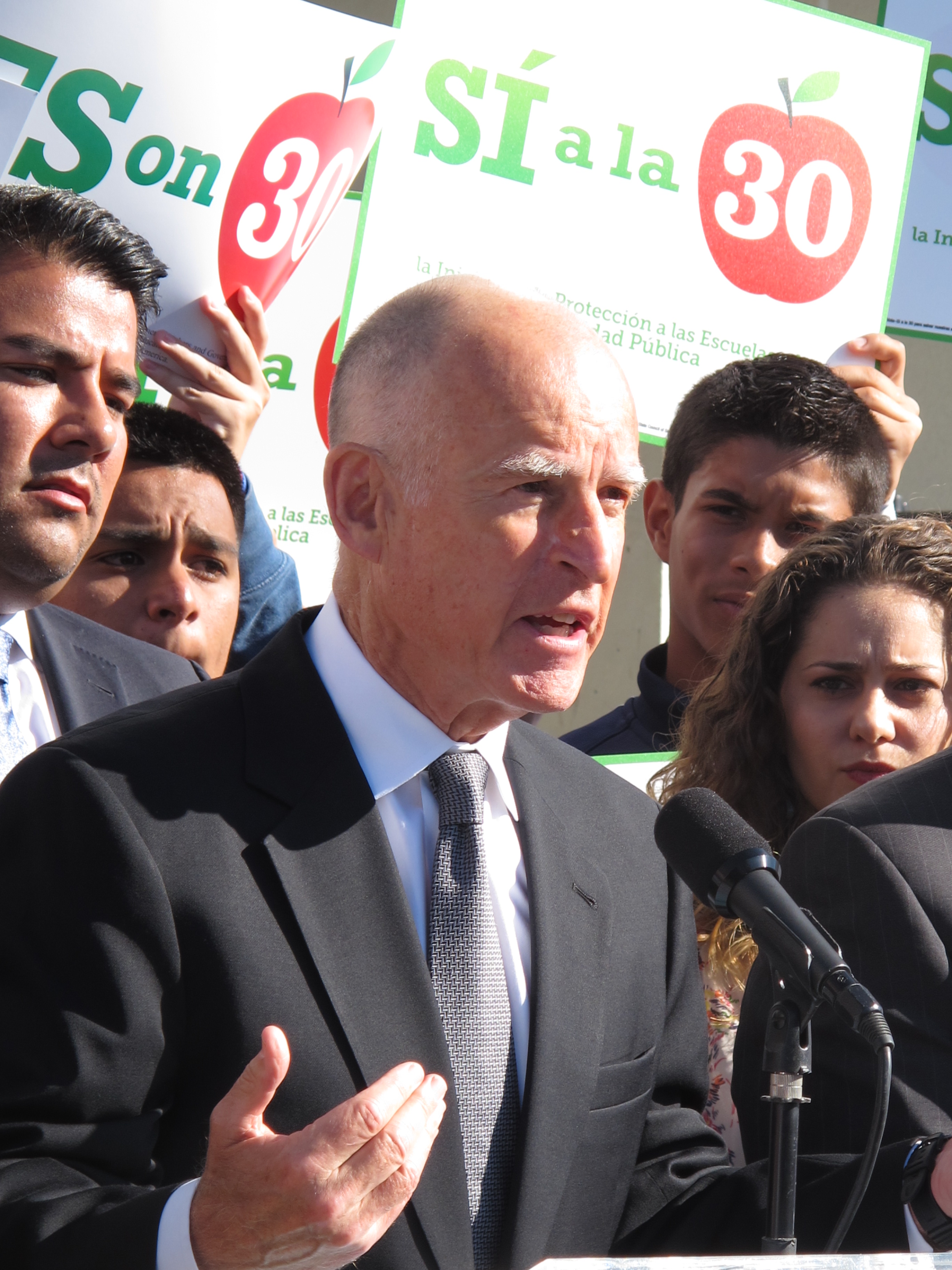
Jerry Brown

Chamber of Commerce v. Brown, 554 U.S. 60 (2008), is a United States labor law case, concerning the scope of federal preemption against state law for labor rights.

== Facts ==
Organizations whose members did business with California sued to enjoin enforcement of Assembly Bill 1889 (AB 1889), which, among other things, prohibited employers that receive state grants or more than $10,000 in state program funds per year from using the funds "to assist, promote, or deter union organizing." Attorney General of California Jerry Brown defended the case.

The federal District Court granted the plaintiffs partial summary judgment, holding that the National Labor Relations Act (NLRA) pre-empted those portions of AB 1889 because they regulated employer speech about union organizing under circumstances in which Congress intended free debate. The Ninth Circuit Court of Appeals reversed, concluding that Congress did not intend to preclude States from imposing such restrictions on the use of their own funds.

== Judgment ==
Seven judges on the Supreme Court held that California was preempted from passing a law prohibiting any recipient of state funds either from using money to promote or deter union organizing efforts.

Although the NLRA itself contains no express pre-emption provision, we have held that Congress implicitly mandated two types of pre-emption as necessary to implement federal labor policy. The first, known as Garmon pre-emption, see San Diego Building Trades Council v. Garmon, 359 U. S. 236 (1959), “is intended to preclude state interference with the National Labor Relations Board’s interpretation and active enforcement of the ‘integrated scheme of regulation’ established by the NLRA.” Golden State Transit Corp. v. Los Angeles, 475 U. S. 608, 613 (1986) (Golden State I). To this end, Garmon pre-emption forbids States to “regulate activity that the NLRA protects, prohibits, or arguably protects or prohibits.” Wisconsin Dept. of Industry v. Gould Inc., 475 U. S. 282, 286 (1986). The second, known as Machinists pre-emption, forbids both the National Labor Relations Board (NLRB) and States to regulate conduct that Congress intended “be unregulated because left ‘to be controlled by the free play of economic forces.’” Machinists v. Wisconsin Employment Relations Comm’n, 427 U. S. 132, 140 (1976) (quoting NLRB v. Nash-Finch Co., 404 U. S. 138, 144 (1971)). Machinists pre-emption is based on the premise that “ ‘Congress struck a balance of protection, prohibition, and laissez-faire in respect to union organization, collective bargaining, and labor disputes.’ ” 427 U. S., at 140, n. 4 (quoting Cox, Labor Law Preemption Revisited, 85 Harv. L. Rev. 1337, 1352 (1972)).

Today we hold that §§16645.2 and 16645.7 are pre-empted under Machinists because they regulate within “a zone protected and reserved for market freedom.” Building & Constr. Trades Council v. Associated Builders & Contractors of Mass./R. I., Inc., 507 U. S. 218, 227 (1993) (Boston Harbor). We do not reach the question whether the provisions would also be pre-empted under Garmon.

[...]

It is beyond dispute that California enacted AB 1889 in its capacity as a regulator rather than a market participant. AB 1889 is neither “specifically tailored to one particular job” nor a “legitimate response to state procurement constraints or to local economic needs.” Gould, 475 U. S., at 291. As the statute’s preamble candidly acknowledges, the legislative purpose is not the efficient procurement of goods and services, but the furtherance of a labor policy. See 2000 Cal. Stats. ch. 872, §1. Although a State has a legitimate proprietary interest in ensuring that state funds are spent in accordance with the purposes for which they are appropriated, this is not the objective of AB 1889. In contrast to a neutral affirmative requirement that funds be spent solely for the purposes of the relevant grant or program, AB 1889 imposes a targeted negative restriction on employer speech about unionization. Furthermore, the statute does not even apply this constraint uniformly. Instead of forbidding the use of state funds for all employer advocacy regarding unionization, AB 1889 permits use of state funds for select employer advocacy activities that promote unions. Specifically, the statute exempts expenses incurred in connection with, inter alia, giving unions access to the workplace, and voluntarily recognizing unions without a secret ballot election. §§16647(b), (d).

The Court of Appeals held that although California did not act as a market participant in enacting AB 1889, the NLRA did not pre-empt the statute. It purported to distinguish Gould on the theory that AB 1889 does not make employer neutrality a condition for receiving funds, but instead restricts only the use of funds. According to the Court of Appeals, this distinction matters because when a State imposes a “use” restriction instead of a “receipt” restriction, “an employer has and retains the freedom to spend its own funds however it wishes.” 463 F. 3d, at 1088.

California’s reliance on a “use” restriction rather than a “receipt” restriction is, at least in this case, no more consequential than Wisconsin’s reliance on its spending power rather than its police power in Gould. As explained below, AB 1889 couples its “use” restriction with compliance costs and litigation risks that are calculated to make union-related advocacy prohibitively expensive for employers that receive state funds. By making it exceedingly difficult for employers to demonstrate that they have not used state funds and by imposing punitive sanctions for noncompliance, AB 1889 effectively reaches beyond “the use of funds over which California maintains a sovereign interest.” Brief for State Respondents 19....

Justices Stephen Breyer and Ruth Bader Ginsburg dissented because the law was simply neutral to the bargaining process.

The operative sections of the California statute provide that employers who wish to “assist, promote or deter union organizing,” cannot use state money when they do so. The majority finds these provisions pre-empted because in its view the sections regulate employer speech in a manner that weakens, or undercuts, a congressional policy, embodied in NLRA §8(c), “ ‘to encourage free debate on issues dividing labor and management.’ ” Ante, at 6–7 (citing Linn v. Plant Guard Workers, 383 U. S. 53, 62 (1966)).

Although I agree the congressional policy favors “free debate,” I do not believe the operative provisions of the California statute amount to impermissible regulation that interferes with that policy as Congress intended it. First, the only relevant Supreme Court case that found a State’s labor-related spending limitations to be pre-empted differs radically from the case before us. In that case, Wisconsin Dept. of Industry v. Gould Inc., 475 U. S. 282, the Court considered a Wisconsin statute that prohibited the State from doing business with firms that repeatedly violated the NLRA. The Court said that the statute’s “manifest purpose and inevitable effect” was “to enforce” the NLRA’s requirements, which “role Congress reserved exclusively for the [National Labor Relations Board].” Id., at 291. In a word, the Wisconsin statute sought “to compel conformity with the NLRA.” Building & Constr. Trades Council v. Associated Builders & Contractors of Mass./R. I., Inc., 507 U. S. 218, 228 (1993) (emphasis added).

California’s statute differs from the Wisconsin statute because it does not seek to compel labor-related activity. Nor does it seek to forbid labor-related activity. It permits all employers who receive state funds to “assist, promote, or deter union organizing.” It simply says to those employers, do not do so on our dime. I concede that a federal law that forces States to pay for labor-related speech from public funds would encourage more of that speech. But no one can claim that the NLRA is such a law. And without such a law, a State’s refusal to pay for labor-related speech does not impermissibly discourage that activity. To refuse to pay for an activity (as here) is not the same as to compel others to engage in that activity (as in Gould).

Second, California’s operative language does not weaken or undercut Congress’ policy of “encourag[ing] free debate on issues dividing labor and management.” Linn, supra, at 62. For one thing, employers remain free to spend their own money to “assist, promote, or deter” unionization. More importantly, I cannot conclude that California’s statute would weaken or undercut any such congressional policy because Congress itself has enacted three statutes that, using identical language, do precisely the same thing. Congress has forbidden recipients of Head Start funds from using the funds to “assist, promote, or deter union organizing.” 42 U. S. C. §9839(e). It has forbidden recipients of Workforce Investment Act of 1998 funds from using the funds to “assist, promote, or deter union organizing.” 29 U. S. C. §2931(b)(7). And it has forbidden recipients of National Community Service Act of 1990 funds from using the funds to “assist, promote, or deter union organizing.” 42 U. S. C. §12634(b)(1). Could Congress have thought that the NLRA would prevent the States from enacting the very same kinds of laws that Congress itself has enacted? Far more likely, Congress thought that directing government funds away from labor-related activity was consistent, not inconsistent, with, the policy of “encourag[ing] free debate” embedded in its labor statutes.

Finally, the law normally gives legislatures broad authority to decide how to spend the People’s money. A legislature, after all, generally has the right not to fund activities that it would prefer not to fund—even where the activities are otherwise protected....
