= NLRB v. Mackay Radio & Telegraph Co. =

- Supreme Court of the United States

Argued April 5–6, 1938 Decided May 16, 1938
- Full case name: National Labor Relations Board v. Mackay Radio & Telegraph Co.
- Citations: 304 U.S. 333 (more) 58 S. Ct. 904; 82 L. Ed. 1381; 1938 U.S. LEXIS 1097

Case history
- Prior: 87 F.2d 611; 92 F.2d 761 (9th Cir. 1937)

Holding
- Striking workers continue to be employees within the meaning of the National Labor Relations Act, and an employer commits an unfair labor practice when it replaces striking workers with new employees

Court membership
- Chief Justice Charles E. Hughes Associate Justices James C. McReynolds · Louis Brandeis; Pierce Butler · Harlan F. Stone; Owen Roberts · Benjamin N. Cardozo; Hugo Black · Stanley F. Reed

Case opinion
- Majority: Roberts, joined by Hughes, McReynolds, Brandeis, Butler, Stone, Black
- Cardozo and Reed took no part in the consideration or decision of the case.

Laws applied
- National Labor Relations Act

NLRB v. Mackay Radio & Telegraph Co., 304 U.S. 333 (1938), is a United States labor law case of the Supreme Court of the United States which held that workers who strike remain employees for the purposes of the National Labor Relations Act (NLRA). The Court granted the relief sought by the National Labor Relations Board, which sought to have the workers reinstated by the employer. However, the decision is much better known today for its obiter dicta in which the Court said that an employer may hire strikebreakers and is not bound to discharge any of them if or when the strike ends.

The Mackay doctrine, as the striker replacement portion of the ruling is known, is one of the most significant Supreme Court rulings in American labor law, and has defined collective bargaining in the United States since its publication. "Mackay Radio was more than a decision that provided an instrumental method for a firm to replace economic strikers and to resist their return to employment after a strike. It was also a decision that established important practices that constituted the conduct of union-management bargaining during the post-New Deal Era."

The ruling is also highly controversial, even more than 80 years later. It is strongly and uniformly condemned by labor unions, and resolutely defended by employers. Among academics in the political sciences and other related disciplines, "the doctrine continues to provoke the notice and the nearly universal condemnation of scholars."

== Background ==
=== Company history ===
The Mackay Radio & Telegraph Company was founded in 1884 by John William Mackay (a wealthy silver mine owner) and James Gordon Bennett as the Commercial Cable Company with the goal of providing transatlantic telegraph service. Mackay next incorporated the Postal Telegraph Company to expand the system across the continental United States. In 1901, Mackay formed the Commercial Pacific Cable Company to provide cable telegraphic service across the Pacific Ocean. Although Mackay died in 1902, his son, Clarence Mackay, continued to head the company. In 1925, Clarence Mackay founded Mackay Radio, and added a radio network to the telegraph business. In 1928, the Mackay Radio & Telegraph Co. merged with its two cable siblings and All America Cables to form the American Cable & Radio Corporation. The majority shareholder in the new company was the International Telephone & Telegraph Co.

=== Legislative background ===
On June 16, 1933, President Franklin D. Roosevelt signed the National Industrial Recovery Act into law. Section 7(a) of the NIRA guaranteed the right of labor unions to organize, and a wave of unionization swept the country. To administer Section 7(a), the National Labor Board (NLB) was created on August 5, 1933. The three-member NLB quickly adopted two sets of rules to deal with strikes and replacement workers. Whenever a strike occurred because of an employer's violation of Section 7(a), the NLB ordered the reinstatement of striking workers. But if the workers struck for economic reasons (for example, to win a wage increase), then the NLB refused to order the reinstatement of the strikers. Although at least one member of the Board strongly disagreed with the distinction between the two kinds of strikes and the legality of strikebreakers under Section 7(a), striker replacement became accepted federal labor policy.

In 1934, at the behest of the American Federation of Labor, Senator Robert F. Wagner began work on a bill that would have banned the replacement of striking workers. The bill was strongly opposed by the National Association of Manufacturers and other employer groups, which argued that the bill would permanently deprive replacement workers of the right to join a union, participate in a union, or become a full-time employee. Many of Sen. Wagner's legal and labor advisors also made the same arguments. The National Urban League also opposed the bill as since many AFL unions discriminated against African American workers, who were often employed as strikebreakers. The League felt the bill would be racially discriminatory and hinder the League's efforts to open union membership to all.

Wagner's bill never made it out of committee. When Wagner introduced a new version of the bill in 1935, the legislation omitted all reference to striker replacement. Committee staff reports noted that the bill conformed to existing Lochner era law and practice, which gave striking workers protections as employees but permitted striker replacement. The issue of striker replacement received almost no debate in the House or the Senate. The new bill was enacted, and on July 5, 1935, President Roosevelt signed the National Labor Relations Act (NLRA) into law.

Section 2(3) of the National Labor Relations Act (29 U.S.C. §§ 151-169) states:

(3) The term "employee" shall include any employee, and shall not be limited to the employees of a particular employer, unless the Act explicitly states otherwise, and shall include any individual whose work has ceased as a consequence of, or in connection with, any current labor dispute or because of any unfair labor practice, and who has not obtained any other regular and substantially equivalent employment, but shall not include any individual employed as an agricultural laborer, or in the domestic service of any family or person at his home, or any individual employed by his parent or spouse, or any individual having the status of an independent contractor, or any individual employed as a supervisor, or any individual employed by an employer subject to the Railway Labor Act [45 U.S.C. § 151 et seq.], as amended from time to time, or by any other person who is not an employer as herein defined.

=== Strike ===
Labor unions began organizing in the broadcasting industry in the early 1930s. Among the most active of the unions was the American Radio Telegraphists Association (ARTA), later part of the CWA. ARTA would change its name to the American Communications Association and join the Congress of Industrial Organizations. In 1950, the union would be involved in another landmark Supreme Court case, American Communications Association v. Douds, which upheld the Taft-Hartley Act's requirement that officers of labor unions sign affidavits pledging they were not members or supporters of the Communist Party. In 1966, the ACA merged with the Teamsters. ARTA organized radio operators at Mackay Radio & Telegraph in early 1934. There were two units, one for "point-to-point" operators on land and one for operators at sea. The point-to-point operators were organized into three divisions, covering the three major employers (Mackay Radio, Globe Wireless, and RCA). In June 1935, ARTA members in the land and marine divisions at Mackay Radio decided to coordinate their bargaining so that both groups of workers might win a contract. The talks stalled after Mackay Radio threatened to declare bankruptcy, but the union pressed ahead with its demands in September. ARTA asked for recognition of the union, a written contract, the 48-hour week, and a 14.5 percent wage increase. The ARTA members at Mackay Radio held a vote and authorized a strike if no contract was forthcoming by September 23, 1935. No agreement was reached, and the strike began at 12:01 a.m. on October 5, 1935. In San Francisco, Mackay's primary transmission office on the West Coast, 60 of the 62 operators walked off the job. But the strike was far less successful elsewhere. Workers in Seattle and New York City walked out for only a few hours. In Washington, New Orleans, Chicago, and West Palm Beach, workers either did not strike or walked out in such few numbers as to make the strike ineffective. The company flew in 11 replacement workers from other offices to keep the San Francisco office functioning.

By the early morning of October 8, 1935, it was apparent the strike had failed. At a meeting between the union and a company representative early that day, the company announced that all but 11 men could return to work. The company representative handed the union a list containing the names of the 11 men, and said the 11 could apply for work. The men would be rehired, however, only if positions opened up. Although the list contained the names of some of the strongest union supporters, the union members voted to return to work on the company's terms. The strike ended at 6:00 a.m. that morning. The 11 men applied for work, and seven were rehired two days later. The four operators not rehired were the most senior and best paid men, as well as the strongest union supporters.

ARTA immediately filed a complaint with the NLRB. The NLRB issued its own complaint on November 9, 1935, and a hearing was conducted from December 2 to December 20. The Board transferred authority to issue a ruling from the Regional Office to the national Board on December 19. On February 20, 1936, the NLRB issued its decision in Mackay Radio & Telegraph Co. The Board specifically avoided ruling on whether the replacement workers were strikebreakers and what right they had to their jobs. Instead, the Board focused almost exclusively on the fact that the employer had discriminated against the four men based on their protected union activities.

=== Legal appeals ===
Mackay Radio refused to comply with the board's order, and within days the board filed for enforcement with the Ninth Circuit Court of Appeals. The decision to take the case to the courts was not made lightly. NLRB staff were timing the issuance of decisions carefully, and the legal staff was on the lookout for cases which would enable the board to successfully defend a constitutional challenge to the NLRA. The appellate court heard oral argument on April 16, 1936. On January 11, 1937, the Court of Appeals declined 2-to-1 to enforce the board's order. Writing for the majority, Judge Curtis D. Wilbur held that while the strikers were employees under the NLRA, the NLRA unconstitutionally violated the Fifth Amendment and the constitutionally guaranteed freedom of contract. Judge Clifton Mathews concurred in the result. He found the NLRA constitutional, but concluded that the strikers were no longer employees. Judge Francis Arthur Garrecht concluded the NLRA was constitutional and that the strikers were employees under the meaning of the Act.

But then on April 12, 1937, the U.S. Supreme Court upheld the constitutionality of the NLRA in NLRB v. Jones & Laughlin Steel Corp.

The NLRB asked for a rehearing by the Ninth Circuit in light of the Supreme Court's ruling in NLRB v. Jones & Laughlin Steel. The court agreed to do so. But on rehearing, the appeals court again refused to enforce the Board's order. Although Judges Mathews and Garrecht held to their original views, Judge Wilbur now conceded the Act's constitutionality. However, he concluded that the strikers were no longer employees as defined by the Act. Only if workers walked off the job to protest an unfair labor practice did they remain employees.

On January 15, 1938, Solicitor General Stanley Forman Reed appealed the case to the U.S. Supreme Court. Certiorari was granted in February, and oral argument heard from April 5 to April 6, 1938. Arguing the case for the NLRB was General Counsel Charles H. Fahy. Reed had been nominated to the Supreme Court the day the appeal occurred, so the new Solicitor General, Robert H. Jackson, argued the case for the United States. California attorney Louis W. Myers argued the case for Mackay Radio.

== Decision ==
Associate Justice Owen Roberts wrote the decision for a unanimous court. Justice Reed and Justice Cardozo did not participate in the oral argument or decision of the Court.

Half of Justice Roberts' opinion provides, in great detail, the facts of the case in question, covering the contract talks, the strike, the strike's collapse, the offer to return to work, and the various proceedings before the Court of Appeals.

Roberts began the substantive part of the Court's ruling by asserting the Court's jurisdiction without comment and dismissing Mackay Radio's claim that the appeal had violated federal rules of civil procedure.

Roberts next drew two conclusions. First, he found that a current labor dispute had existed as required under Section 2(3). Mackay Radio had argued that it was not at fault for the failed contract talks, but Justice Roberts concluded that was irrelevant. "The wisdom or unwisdom" of the union's decision to strike did not matter; all that mattered was that a current labor dispute existed. Second, Justice Roberts implicitly refused to involve the court in assessing whether Section 2(3) constitutionally made striking workers employees. Roberts quoted the relevant section of the NLRA, and concluded the workers were still employees under the plain meaning of the Act.

Next, Justice Roberts addressed the employer's claim that it was not guilty of an unfair labor practice (ULP). Mackay Radio had asserted that the Board had jurisdiction only over ULP cases, and this was not a ULP case. Justice Roberts agreed that no ULP had been committed in connection with the negotiations. But, in the ruling's most-quoted section, Justice Roberts addressed the question of whether Mackay Radio had committed a ULP for hiring the strikebreakers:

Although section 13 of the act, 29 U.S.C.A. 163, provides, 'Nothing in this Act (chapter) shall be construed so as to interfere with or impede or diminish in any way the right to strike,' it does not follow that an employer, guilty of no act denounced by the statute, has lost the right to protect and continue his business by supplying places left vacant by strikers. And he is not bound to discharge those hired to fill the places of strikers, upon the election of the latter to resume their employment, in order to create places for them.

The Court cited as authoritative National Labor Relations Board v. Bell Oil & Gas Co. If Mackay Radio had refused to rehire the workers because of anti-union animus, then that would be an unfair labor practice, the court held. Reviewing briefly the evidence generated by the Board during the hearings, Justice Roberts concluded that anti-union animus had motivated the employer and thus reinstatement was proper.

While the employer had claimed that the Board's action violated the due process requirements of the Fifth Amendment. Justice Roberts, citing NLRB v. Jones & Laughlin Steel, concluded that Congress could infringe on property rights for reasonable purposes, including the suppression of labor strife. Hence, the Board's order was not a violation of the Fifth Amendment.

The Court's ruling concluded with a lengthy discussion of the nature of the Board's order. The employer had claimed that the Board's order was arbitrary and capricious. Justice Roberts reviewed at length the Board's evidentiary hearings, the language of the order, and the nature of the charges against Mackay Radio. Mackay Radio's claim, Roberts said, largely turned on whether the Board had failed to define a current labor dispute. But having already dismissed that argument earlier, Roberts concluded that the Board's order was appropriate.

The ruling of the Ninth Circuit Court of Appeals was reversed and remanded.

== Subsequent collective bargaining developments ==
=== Collective bargaining at Mackay Radio ===
Mackay Radio asked for a rehearing by the Supreme Court, but the Court declined this request.

After very lengthy negotiations, ARTA members negotiated a contract with Mackay Radio in late 1939. The employer complained strenuously and publicly about the impositions the contract created, but did not commit any unfair labor practices. Implementation of the contract was rocky. Workers engaged in several job actions (such as work slow-downs) before receiving their raises in March 1940.

ARTA workers struck again at Mackay Radio in 1948. The Supreme Court's ruling in NLRB v. Mackay Radio was used during that strike to deny reinstatement to over 60 striking workers.

=== Growing use of strikebreakers since 1970 ===
Mackay Radio has had a significant impact on collective bargaining and labor relations in the United States. As several legal scholars and others have noted, the decision makes the "United States... almost alone in the world in allowing permanent replacement of workers who exercise the right to strike."

Although the Supreme Court permitted strikebreakers to be hired under the Mackay doctrine, replacement workers remained largely unused by employers from the mid-1930s to the early 1970s. Scholars attribute this to a gentlemen's agreement or social contract under which American employers and unions both agreed to seek labor peace. The increased use of strikebreakers began in the late 1960s, and trended significantly upward in the early 1970s. President Ronald Reagan's replacement of striking air traffic controllers in 1981 reinforced the trend, perhaps sundering the social contract permanently.

Some scholars assert that the Mackay doctrine contains too many exceptions to be used effectively and frequently and that strikebreakers are rarely used. They point out that the use of or threat to use strikebreakers has led to a significant decrease in the number of strikes. The threat to use strikebreakers may also act as a check on unreasonable union collective bargaining demands.

However, many scholars and studies draw the opposite conclusion. A 1991 study by the Government Accountability Office based on data from the Federal Mediation and Conciliation Service found that, of all strikes from 1985 to 1989, about 10 percent of major and 16 percent of minor strikes involved the use of strikebreakers. The occurrence of replacement workers was three times higher in strikes which lasted at least a month in duration. Academic studies support this conclusion.

One 1988 survey found that 35 percent of employers said that they would definitely hire replacement workers if struck, while another 45 percent said that they would consider doing so.

Not all strikebreakers permanently replace workers. But when replacement workers are permanent, the duration of the strike lengthens appreciably. The average duration of strikes in which replacement workers are used lengthened as much as 10-fold. Permanent replacements also dramatically affect the collective bargaining outcome, with unions settling on much less favorable terms.

Threats to use strikebreakers are also becoming prominent before a strike occurs. Several studies of collective bargaining tactics have found that management threatens to use strikebreakers more often than unions threaten to strike, and that the frequency of such threats increased.

Some legal scholars have concluded that the Mackay doctrine has become a tool for allowing employers to engage in bad-faith bargaining. This creates a bargaining impasse, and the threat of strikebreakers coerces unions into accepting an employer's (unlawful) last offer.

Presumably, one implication of the Mackay ruling was that employers would seek to avoid unfair labor practice (ULP) strikes, since the Court had clearly given the protection of the law to such strikes. But this has not been borne out in practice. The social contract encouraging employers to refrain from unfair labor practices has broken down. Employers routinely challenge ULP charges in court (leading to lengthy litigation), and the relief offered under the NLRA has proved itself to be ineffective in discouraging employer ULPs. Consequently, "the most remarkable phenomenon in the representation process in the past quarter-century has been an astronomical increase in unfair labor practices by employers." The legal system "must bear a major share of the blame for providing employers with the opportunity and the incentives" to commit ULPs.

The growing use of strikebreakers under the Mackay ruling might have contributed to the development by unions of extra-legal organizing and collective bargaining tools. Allowing employers the permanent replacement of striking workers leads to union capitulation, not to bargaining or industrial peace, many legal scholars note. Unions subsequently seek ways out of this dilemma. The development of card check and neutrality agreements and the comprehensive campaign are logical outcomes of the breakdown of the organizing and collective bargaining protections of the National Labor Relations Act.

== Subsequent legal developments ==
The Supreme Court has extended the Mackay Radio ruling repeatedly since 1938, and the Congress enacted legislation addressing the issue of strikebreakers twice in the two decades after the decision.

In 1945, the Supreme Court issued its first decision on strikebreakers since Mackay Radio. In Republic Aviation Corp. v. NLRB, the Court held that an employer committed a ULP when it hired strikebreakers because the employer had treated employees differently from how it would have treated them had they not been engaged in union solicitation.

Two years later, Congress passed the Taft-Hartley Act, which significantly affected the use of strikebreakers. One of the innovations of the Taft-Hartley Act provided a mechanism for workers to vote out ("decertify") a union. Section 9(e)(2) of the Taft-Hartley Act created decertification elections, which would permit workers to take a vote on whether they wished to retain existing union representation. Section 9(e)(2) had the intended side-effect of disenfranchising striking workers. Employers quickly exploited this loophole by hiring permanent replacement workers and then petitioning for a decertification election. The practice became so common that President Dwight Eisenhower denounced it several times.

As the use of strikebreakers increased, the Supreme Court was forced to address several issues arising from the practice. One key issue was motive: Did it matter if the use of strikebreakers was motivated by anti-union animus? In Radio Officers' Union v. NLRB, the Supreme Court held that proof of motive was indeed required. However, no proof of motive was needed where employer conduct "inherently" encouraged or discouraged union membership. A second issue involved use of the whipsaw strike. As unionization in an industry spread, unions encouraged employers to bargain as a group. To discourage employers from breaking away from the group, unions developed the whipsaw strike—in which the union would strike one employer at a time, one after another. Employer groups would counter the whipsaw strike by locking out all workers at all employers belonging to the group, and using strikebreakers to provide temporary or permanent replacements. The question before the Court was whether the lockout was an unfair labor practice. In NLRB v. Truck Drivers Local 449 ("Buffalo Linen Supply Co."), the Court held that such a lockout was not a ULP.

In 1959, Congress addressed the inequities created by Section 9(e)(2) of the Taft-Hartley Act. The Labor Management Reporting and Disclosure Act (also known as the Landrum-Griffin Act) amended the Taft-Hartley Act to permit striking workers to vote in a union decertification election held within one calendar year after the commencement of a strike.

The Supreme Court revisited the Mackay Radio ruling repeatedly from the early 1960s into the late 1980s. Many of the Court's decisions addressed the conditions under which an employer exhibited anti-union animus. In NLRB v. Erie Resistor Corp., the Court held that a grant of superseniority to strikebreakers constituted anti-union animus and was a ULP. Building on its ruling in Buffalo Linen Supply Co., the Supreme Court held in American Ship Building Co. v. NLRB, that an employer may lock out its employees without violating the NLRA if a bargaining impasse has been reached and the lockout is for the purpose of applying economic pressure to support the employer’s bargaining position. However, the employer cannot hire permanent replacements, only temporary ones. The high court further extended the "Mackay doctrine" in NLRB v. Brown Food Stores, holding that an employer could lock out its employees in advance of a whipsaw strike so long as the employer only utilized temporary replacements and locked out all workers (not just those who supported the union). These cases did not address the partial lockout, however. The Court addressed that issue in 1967. In NLRB v. Great Dane Trailers, Inc., the Supreme Court held that an employer could avoid being charged with a ULP if it could provide a legitimate and substantial business justification for treating union workers differently than its other employees. However, even if the employer could offer such a justification, the NLRB could still attempt to show anti-union animus at trial.

Many of the Supreme Court's post-Mackay decisions involved balancing the rights of strikebreakers and those who crossed the picket line against the rights of striking workers. This was a logical outcome of the Mackay Radio decision, for the Mackay Court had asserted that strikers remained employees. But the Mackay Court never addressed the legal status of strikebreakers, which it now began to do. In Belknap, Inc. v. Hale, the Court held that strikebreakers who were offered permanent employment and then replaced to make room for returning strikers could seek relief in state court for breach of contract and misrepresentation. The Court also began to address the status of union members who crossed picket lines. The Court upheld a union's ability to fine members who crossed picket lines and held that replaced strikers are entitled to reinstatement if the employer expands its workforce after a strike. However, the Supreme Court held that a union may not compel an employer to fire union members who cross a picket line. And in NLRB v. Granite State Joint Board, the Supreme Court held that a union member who crosses a picket line can avoid union sanctions by simply resigning from the union. Upholding the right to freedom of association, the Court also held that unions may not constitutionally prohibit members from resigning in order to avoid sanctions for crossing picket lines. The right to work, the Court said, even protected an employer's right to entice striking workers back to work with promises of promotions or better pay.

In 1991, the Supreme Court issued the most recent (as of early 2008) of its post-Mackay decisions. That year, the Court held that permanent replacements could not automatically be presumed to oppose an incumbent union. Therefore, use of strikebreakers was not automatically a presumption of anti-union animus.

In 1994, an effort was made in Congress to repeal Mackay Radio. Members of the United Paperworkers' International Union conducted a nationwide strike against International Paper, one of the largest paper manufacturers in the world, in 1987. International Paper utilized permanent replacements as strikebreakers. The labor dispute was particularly bitter at the International Paper plant in the small town of Androscoggin, Maine. The union was unsuccessful in winning a new contract, and an election held a year later decertified the union. The Maine AFL-CIO asked one of Maine's representatives in the House of Representatives to introduce a bill banning permanent replacements. The bill, known as the "Workplace Fairness Act," easily passed the House. On July 13, 1994, the bill was on the verge of passage in the Senate when it was blocked by a Republican-led filibuster.

Another effort to mitigate the effects of Mackay Radio occurred a year later. On March 8, 1995, President Bill Clinton issued Executive Order 12954, which barred the federal government from contracting with employers who permanently replaced striking workers. The United States Chamber of Commerce filed suit in federal court to have the executive order overturned. In Chamber of Commerce v. Reich, the U.S. Court of Appeals for the D.C. Circuit held that the NLRA preempted the executive order, and ordered that Executive Order 12954 no longer be enforced.

Continuing legal uncertainty over the implications of Mackay Radio continue. This has affected decisions of the NLRB in particular. For example, in 1997, the National Labor Relations Board held in Target Rock, that advising replacement employees of their at-will employment status implied that the strikebreakers were not permanent replacements. But the Board later overruled Target Rock in 2007 in Jones Plastic & Engineering.

== Assessment by academia ==
=== General assessment of Mackay Radio ===
Among political scientists and legal historians, "Mackay Radio" has been one of the most heavily criticized Supreme Court decisions, and the most derided of the Court's labor law rulings. It has been called "the worst contribution that the U.S. Supreme Court has made to the current shape of labor law in this country." Scholars have lashed Mackay Radio for severely undermining the statutorily protected right to strike, calling the decision a "transparent maiming" of the NLRA. Some have gone so far as to conclude that Mackay Radio now threatens to undermine the entire statutory scheme of American labor law.

Nearly every criticism of Mackay Radio is aimed at the Court's "duplicitous distinction" between firing and permanently replacing striking workers. While some legal analyses concede the ruling might be technically correct under some concepts of the law, the distinction is "a hollow, technical difference" in the real world which has "rendered the strike useless and virtually suicidal...".

The ruling is so poorly decided, some scholars conclude, that only the doctrine of stare decisis can account for its continuing use by the Court.

=== Internal inconsistencies and problems ===
A number of problems have been identified in the Mackay Radio ruling itself which have led scholars to heavily criticize the decision.

Primary among these is that Mackay Radio directly contradicts the express language of the National Labor Relations Act (NLRA). Section 7 of the NLRA explicitly protects the right to strike. Section 8(a)(1) makes it an unfair labor practice for an employer "to interfere with, restrain, or coerce employees in the exercise of the rights guaranteed in section 7". But an employer's ability to fire and permanently replace an employee for exercising her statutorily guaranteed right to strike greatly "interferes with" the right to strike. Furthermore, Section 8(a)(3) makes it an unfair labor practice to discriminate "in regard to hire or tenure of employment or any term or condition of employment to encourage or discourage membership in any labor organization..." Yet, an employer who declines to terminate workers who refuse to strike, agrees to retain workers who return to work, declines to fire replacement workers, and refuses to reinstate strikers clearly discriminates, in a most basic and fundamental way, against those who exercise the right to strike. The Taft-Hartley Act amendments do not alter this conclusion.

Mackay Radio also directly contradicts the NLRA's explicit statutory purpose of encouraging collective bargaining. According to Section 1 of the Act:

It is declared to be the policy of the United States to ... [encourage] the practice and procedure of collective bargaining and by protecting the exercise by workers of full freedom of association, self-organization, and designation of representatives of their own choosing, for the purpose of negotiating the terms and conditions of their employment or other mutual aid or protection.

Congress sought to redress the "inequality of bargaining power" between employees and employers. But by allowing an employer to permanently replace any worker who strikes, the Court explicitly ignored the explicit declaration of Congressional intent contained in Section 1.

Another of the major criticisms of the ruling is its failure to cite sources or provide any reasoning to support the existence of an employer right permanently to replace strikers. The Court presented its conclusion as a series of assertions. It did not discuss the words of the Act, did not provide logical arguments or rationales for its conclusions, and did not discuss alternative policy or economic or political choices. No policy justification was given for the ruling, and the Court never discussed the Act's legislative history to support the conclusion it reached.

=== Theoretical weaknesses ===
Scholars also criticize Mackay Radio on theoretical grounds. Among these are its implicit jurisprudence, its theoretical weaknesses, and the policy outcomes it promoted.

Many scholars see Mackay Radio as one of the last of the Lochner era decisions. From about 1890 to 1937, the Supreme Court tended to apply a strongly libertarian judicial philosophy. By 1937, shifting judicial philosophies within the Court as well as continuing economic and social upheaval led the Court to abandon its Lochner era philosophy. But the language of Mackay Radio harkens back to Lochner era employment rights philosophies which many thought the Supreme Court had abandoned a year earlier. Mackay Radio implies that the rights the Court intended to protect preexisted the National Labor Relations Act and remained unaffected by the Act. For many legal analysts, it is clear that the Supreme Court relied heavily on and restated Lochner era doctrines developed by the courts and adopted by the NLRB's predecessor agencies. Indeed, the NLRB itself had adopted a Lochner era philosophy. The Board had conceded in its Reply Brief that an employer had the right to utilize strikebreakers. "The Act clearly does not forbid him, in the absence of such unfair labor practices, to replace the striking employees with new employees or authorize an order directing that all strikers be reinstated and new employees discharged." The Supreme Court's decision not only squared completely with the Board's brief and previous Board decisions, but also reflected the deeply conservative construction of the Act that the NLRB had taken (worried that an assertive reading and application of the NLRA would lead the Court to find the Act unconstitutional). But the Court went much further in its decision than merely deferring to the expertise of the Board. The high court deliberately utilized 19th-century judicial rulings to protect employer prerogatives at the expense of employee rights. Although the intent of the NLRA was to protect strike actions to provide workers with a source of bargaining power, Mackay Radio inverted that dynamic so that the strike became an advantage to employers.

Commentators also point out that, even if the ruling's Lochner era legal analysis is appropriate and correctly applied, Mackay Radio is flawed due to the economic assumptions the Court made. Justice Roberts' opinion assumed perfect competition in labor markets, a lack of monopsony, no statistical discrimination, no information asymmetry, market rationality, and a legal regime which provided a level playing field and equal protection under the law. Some—and possibly all—of these assumptions are incorrect. Worse, however, the Mackay Radio decision fashioned strong incentives which made it rational for one bargainer (management) to refuse to cooperate and opt out of bargaining.

The Court also made assumptions about the business necessity of hiring permanent replacement workers which proved incorrect. Legal scholars, economists and others have pointed out that because most strikes are of an extremely short duration, employers do not need to hire replacements of any kind. Additionally, a large majority of businesses may operate for long periods of time without hiring permanent replacement workers by relying on managerial or supervisory personnel, temporary replacements, or workers loaned from other subsidiaries; contracting out work; or stockpiling inventory. The Court not only assumed that an employer needed to hire replacements in order continue operations but also that the employer must grant replacement workers permanent status to induce them to work. Not only is this assumption unwarranted, but the Court itself recognized this in later rulings. In Erie Resistor, Great Dane Trailers, and Fleetwood Trailer, the Court held that employer tactics which are "inherently destructive" of employee rights are enough to run afoul of the NLRA, and no legitimate business reasons is a defense. Yet, in Mackay Radio, hiring permanent replacements—perhaps the act most likely to be inherently destructive of those rights—is held not to be an infringement of the law. A few scholars bluntly conclude that there is no way to reconcile Mackay Radio with these three cases.

The Court's assumptions, some say, have made the Mackay Radio ruling theoretically unsupportable as a matter of equity. Because the Court assumed that employers must hire permanent replacements as a matter of business necessity, the Court did not find it necessary to require the employer to show the need for permanent replacements. This places the burden on either the Board or unions to prove that the employer had an anti-union animus. But the Supreme Court subsequently held that replacement workers cannot be presumed to be anti-union, so their use is not enough to show animus. Indeed, courts have been reluctant to find support for anti-union animus in any except the most extreme cases. As legal scholars point out, under Mackay Radio, employers can now cloak anti-union animus under the guise of using permanent replacements. They note that it is becoming increasingly common for employers to deunionize using permanent replacements, and nearly impossible for unions to obtain legal redress. This has held to a radical shift in American labor policy which Congress did not intend.

Finally, the changing nature of American federal labor law has made the Mackay Radio doctrine pernicious. When Mackay Radio was announced in 1938, unions were allowed to engage in many kinds of secondary activities. Secondary activities are actions directed at businesses and individuals not directly connected to the labor dispute. These include secondary picketing, sympathy strikes, "hot cargo" strikes (continuing to work but refusing to handle products which come from the struck business), secondary boycotts, and picketing of a struck employer's suppliers or customers. The closed shop was also legal at the time, helping unions ensure that only workers who were bound by union rules were hired. But the Taft-Hartley Act (enacted in 1947) and the Labor Management Reporting and Disclosure Act (also known as the Landrum-Griffin Act, enacted in 1959) outlawed these tactics. Under the federal labor law legal regime which existed in 1937, the hiring of permanent replacement workers was not necessarily destructive of the collective bargaining relationship. But under the post-1959 labor law regime, Mackay Radio has turned (as some scholars conclude) collective bargaining into collective begging.

=== Implications for international law ===
Mackay Radio has implications under international law as well. The International Labour Organization has strongly endorsed the right to strike. The ILO Committee on Freedom of Association concluded that the use of permanent replacements violates this right.

The right to strike is one of the essential means through which workers and their organisations may promote and defend their economic and social interests. The Committee considers that this basic right is not really guaranteed when a worker who exercises it legally runs the risk of seeing his or her job taken up permanently by another worker, just as legally. The Committee considers that, if a strike is otherwise legal, the use of labour drawn from outside the undertaking to replace strikers for an indeterminate period entails a risk of derogation from the right to strike which may affect the free exercise of trade union rights.

The mandate of the Committee on Freedom of Association does not permit the committee to level charges at or condemn national governments. Nonetheless, the Committee has concluded that the Mackay Radio doctrine is contrary to the free exercise of trade union rights.

== See also ==
- US labor law
