= Labor rights in American meatpacking industry =

Labor rights in the American meatpacking industry are largely regulated by the National Labor Relations Board (NLRB), which regulates union organization. The Occupational Safety and Health Administration (OSHA) regulates the safety and health conditions applicable to workers in the American meat packing industry. According to scholars of the American meat packing industry, despite federal regulation through OSHA and industry oversight, workers in meat production plants have little agency and inadequate protections. Workers in the industry perform difficult jobs in dangerous conditions, and are at significant risk for physical and psychological harm. In addition to high rates of injury, workers are at risk of losing their jobs when they are injured or for attempting to organize and bargain collectively. Several studies of the industry have found immigrant workers—"an increasing percentage of the workforce in the industry."

== Characteristics of the American meat production industry ==
Within the meat production industry, "meatpacking" is defined as "all manufacturing of meat products including the processing of animals." This includes production of beef, pork, poultry, and fish. The scope of the American meat production industry is large; it slaughters and processes over 10 billion animals per year.

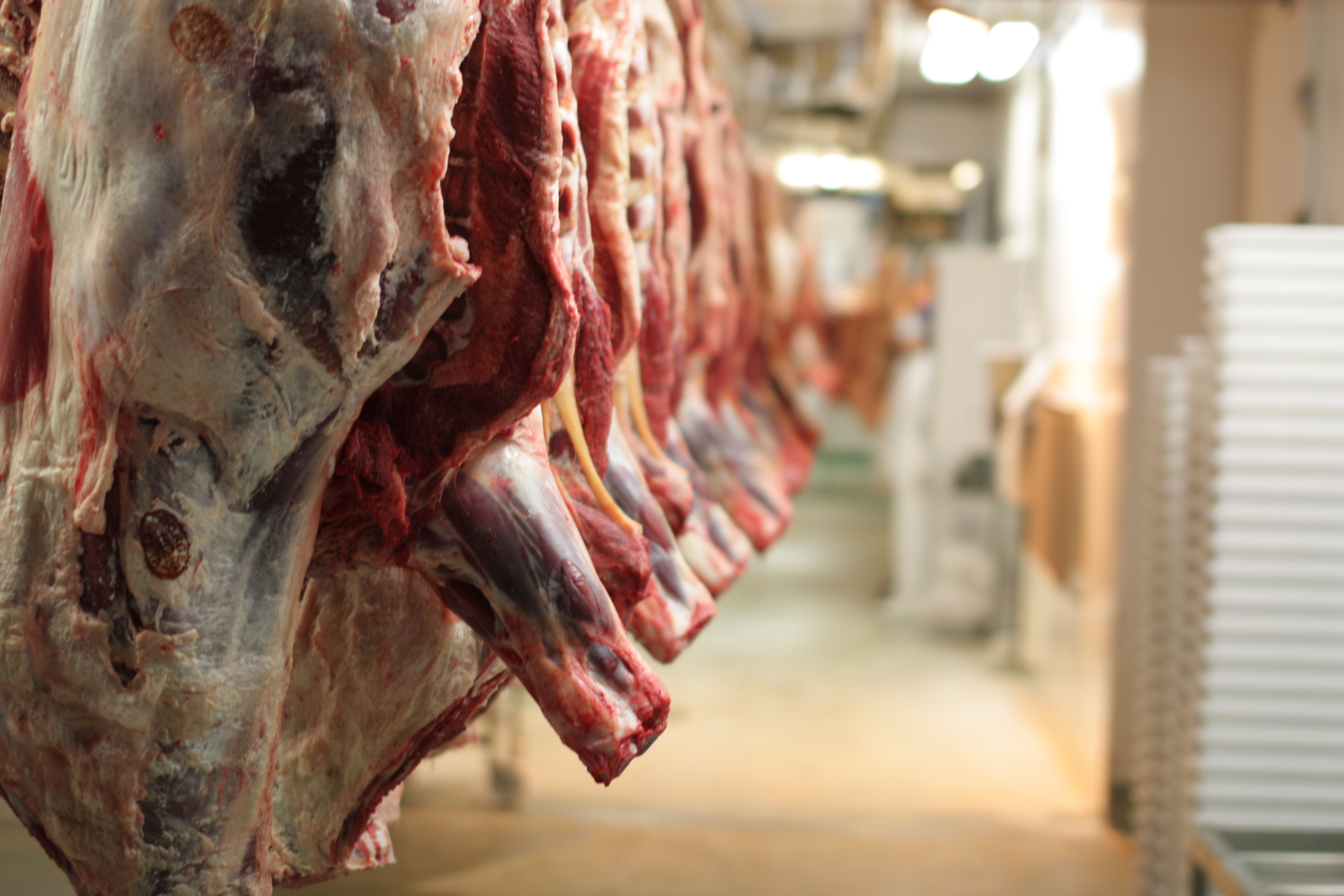
Cattle carcasses in a slaughterhouse

Since 2004, four companies essentially control the American meat production industry. Broken down, the companies managed 81% of the beef production, 59% of the pork production and 50% of the poultry market. Within the poultry industry, Tyson and Perdue control each stage of chicken production, from raising the chicks to shipping the meat to grocery stores.

The number of animals butchered in the meat production industry appears to be growing. In 2010, nearly 10.2 billion land animals were slaughtered and raised for food in the United States. According to a report by the Farm Animal Rights Movement, based on data from the U.S. Department of Agriculture (USDA), these numbers indicate a 1.7% increase from the 2009 data. There was a 0.9% increase in U.S. population between 2009 and 2010, "meaning that animals [slaughtered] per-capita increased slightly" by 0.8%.

=== Meatpacker demographics ===
While American agriculture has largely been dependent on migrant workers for the last century, thousands of immigrants, mainly from Mexico, Guatemala, and El Salvador, now travel north to work in slaughterhouses and meat processing plants. According to a study in the Drake Journal of Agricultural Law, "most meatpacking employees are poor, many are immigrants struggling to survive, and most are now employed in rural locations." In 1998, the Immigration and Naturalization Service estimated that about a quarter of meatpacking workers in Nebraska and Iowa were illegal immigrants. The USDA published similar numbers, estimating the percentage of Hispanic meat-processing workers rising from less than 10% in 1980 to almost 30% in 2000. The lack of rights of undocumented workers makes them invisible to the public. In addition, following the 2002 Supreme Court decision in Hoffman Plastic Compounds, Inc. v. National Labor Relations Board, "immigration law takes precedence over labor law," which challenges undocumented workers' ability to get compensation benefits.

Slaughterhouse employee turnover rates tend to be extremely high. One company, ConAgra Red Meat, reported a 100% annual turnover rate in the 1990s. Such high turnover rates makes it harder for the workforce to unionize and, consequently, easier for the industry to control its workers. Starting in the 1980s, Cargill, Conagra Brands, Tyson Foods and other large food companies moved most slaughterhouse operations to rural areas of the Southern United States which were more hostile to unionization efforts.

The Bureau of Labor Statistics reported that in 2000, 148,100 people worked in meatpacking and over 250,000 worked in poultry processing. Despite the growth of the meat production industry, slaughterhouse workers' wages have been decreasing rapidly. Slaughterhouse workers' wages were historically higher than the average manufacturing wage. This trend reversed in 1983 when slaughterhouse worker wages fell below the average manufacturing wage. By 2002, slaughterhouse workers' wages were 24% below the average manufacturing wage. According to the Bureau of Labor Statistics, in 2006, the median wage for slaughterhouse workers was $10.43 per hour which comes out to $21,690 per year.

== Workers' rights of meat-packers ==
=== Historical context ===
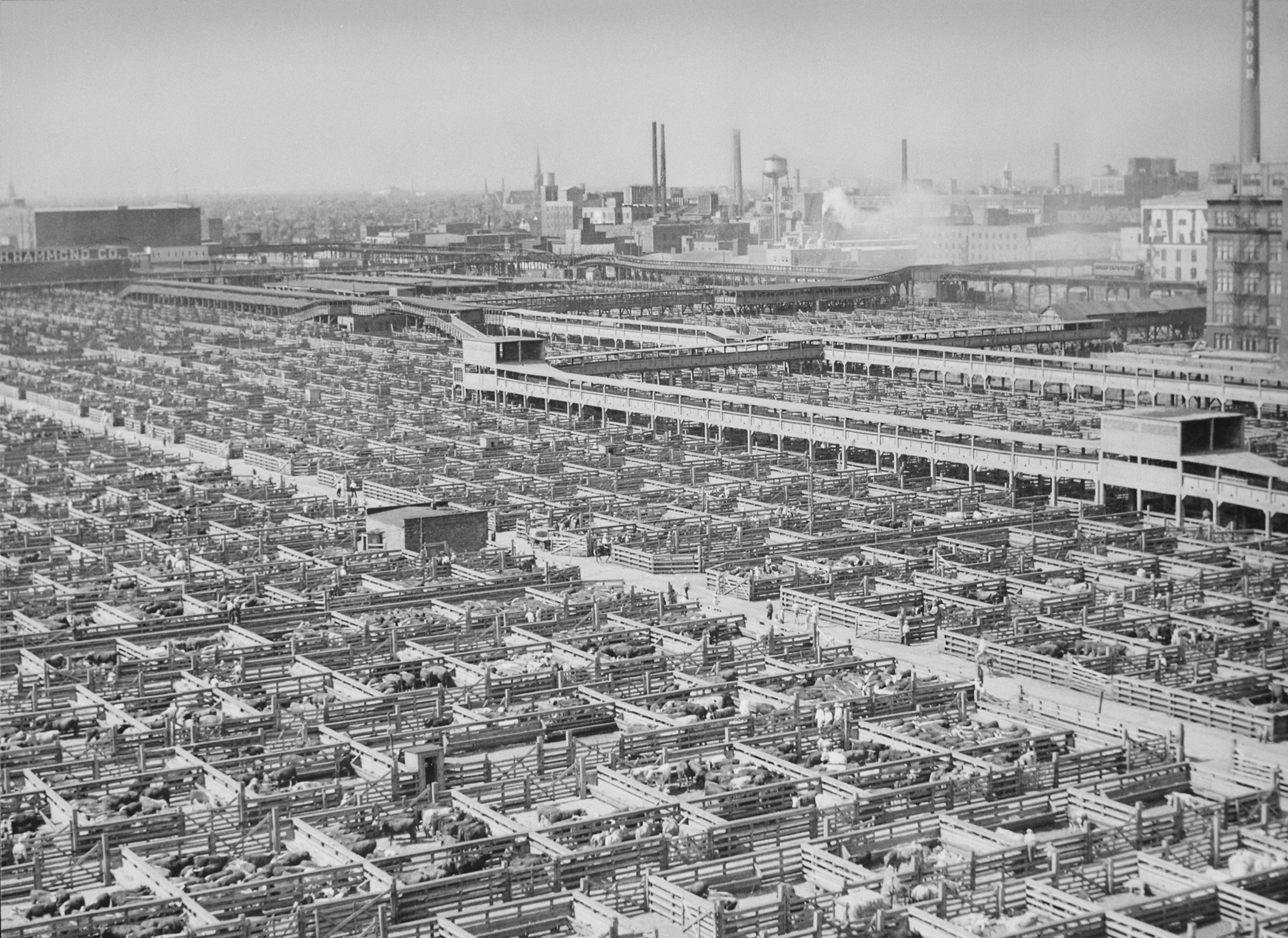
The Union Stockyards was the meat-packing district of Chicago (1947).

In the 19th century, the slaughterhouses of the principal meat companies of the U.S. were in the south side of the city of Chicago, Illinois. To not pay high wages to a skilled workforce, the larger slaughterhouses established a disassembly line to transform a carcass into meat; the disassembly-line production system eliminated the work of skilled meatpackers.

In the slaughterhouse, the difficulty of working on a carcass-disassembly line was in the great daily quota of animals to slaughter-and-dismember. The meatpackers worked in poorly illuminated, cold rooms that featured un-drained floors that held contaminated water, animal feces-and-urine, and the concomitant sewage. In such an inadequate workplace, the meat-packer suffered physical injuries and contagious illness. Moreover, to ensure a stable workforce, the meat companies established rental housing for their workers in the communities that circumscribed the stockyards of Chicago, such as the Back of the Yards neighborhood.

In the early 1880s, the stockyard workers organized into labor-and-trade unions and formally demanded higher wages and proper workplace conditions from the meat companies. Given that most of the meat-packers were recent immigrants from Ireland, Germany, and the Scandinavian countries the meat companies used Old World racism to divide them as organized stockyard workers. The meat companies then "recruited [poor] Poles, Serbs, Croatians, Slovaks, and other recent Southern and Eastern European immigrants as workers" in the stockyards. In the event, when the European white workers unionized and went on strike in 1894, the meat companies then employed Black Americans to work in the stockyards, and so break the strike.

In the novel The Jungle (1904), Upton Sinclair revealed the abuses of the meat-packers and the poor sanitary conditions in the slaughterhouses. The substance of the novel was a factor in the legislation of the Pure Food and Drug Act (1906) and of the Federal Meat Inspection Act (1906). Moreover, the Federal Bureau of Animal Industry then reported to the U.S. Congress meat-company complaints that the presentation of the business practices of the meat industry in The Jungle was "intentionally misleading and false" and also presented "willful and deliberate misrepresentations of fact". Despite the novel and the legislation, Americans "paid little attention to the . . . abusive working conditions and treatment" to which the meatpackers were subjected. Labor rights and working conditions improved consequent to the large-scale organizing of workers into labor-and-trade unions by the Congress of Industrial Organizations (CIO) and the National Labor Relations Act (1935).

From the 1930s to the 1970s, pay and conditions improved for meatpacking workers. According to a report by the Human Rights Watch, "master contracts covering the industry raised wages and safety standards." However, standards began decreasing in the 1980s as companies began relocating to rural areas and certain companies became "industry powerhouses." Iowa Beef Processors (IBP) especially transformed the meat production process so that, in each stage, workers have a mindless, repetitive movement to complete "in what the industry calls a disassembly-line process." IBP and peer companies increased the speed of the lines and decreased wages.

Even if companies chose not to relocate, many companies simply shut down their plants, let their established and organized workers go, and reopened with a non-unionized, immigrant workforce. Employers strongly resisted attempts workers made to unionize in relocated or reopened plants; the recent history of plant closures gave employer threats significant credibility. A Human Rights Watch report on conditions of meat and poultry plants asserted that "as the twentieth century turned into the twenty-first, the meatpacking industry was returning to the jungle" Sinclair wrote about a century before.

=== Industry working conditions ===
Workplace conditions have made meatpacking an extremely dangerous job. The repetitive motions place severe stress on workers' hands, wrists, arms, shoulders and backs. In addition, the disassembly lines move extremely quickly; according to investigative journalist Eric Schlosser, "one of the leading determinants of the injury rate at a slaughterhouse today is the speed of the disassembly line."

The more quickly a line moves, the more difficult it is for a worker to keep up and the higher the chance of injury. To contextualize the speed of disassembly lines today, the old meatpacking plants in Chicago would process about 50 cattle an hour. The newer plants in the 1980s would process about 175 cattle an hour. Today, in the 2018s, some plants process up to 400 cattle an hour. Not only do the disassembly lines move quickly, but workers also reported constant pressure from their supervisors to keep up to pace the line set. According to the Human Rights Watch, federal regulation of speed of disassembly lines only considers two factors: avoiding adulterating the meat and poultry, and not obstructing a plant's productivity.

In his book Fast Food Nation, Schlosser also asserted that workers are pressured to not report injuries. Because the bonuses of managers and foremen are often tied to the injury rates at their plant, slaughterhouse supervisors are not incentivized to report incidents.

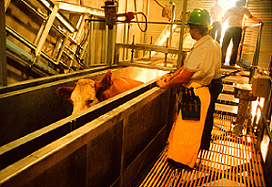
A worker and cattle in a slaughterhouse

Other risks of injury come from the close quarters in which workers cut the meat and the types of jobs they perform. The spacing between workers, as well as the height of the disassembly lines and work surfaces, are the same - despite differences in worker body types. For some workers, this forces them to make an extra effort to complete a given task and creates additional risk of injury. Furthermore, despite the growing automation in slaughterhouses, many of the tasks involve heavy lifting, shoving, and turning animals, animal parts, or equipment.

Although slaughterhouse workers are provided with protective gear, the inevitable condition of the work areas means workers are exposed to "blood, grease, animal feces, ingesta (food from the animal's digestive system), and other detritus from the animals they slaughter."

=== 2020 COVID-19 pandemic ===
See Impact of the COVID-19 pandemic on the meat industry in the United States.

=== Industry response ===
Pro-industry organizations, such as the American Meat Institute (AMI), have pointed out that the number of staff injuries in meat processing facilities have decreased in recent years. According to a 2005 article in The New York Times, "the [meat production] industry also asserted that packing companies did not violate laws allowing workers to unionize and did not treat workers more harshly because of their immigration status." The article quoted Patrick Boyle—president of the American Meat Institute—dismissing the 2005 Human Rights Watch report as "replete with falsehoods and baseless claims."

Representatives of processing plants have also responded to accusations of workers' rights violations. A spokesperson for Tyson Foods said, "we're disappointed by the [Human Rights Watch] report's misleading conclusions, but not surprised given the author's extensive ties to organized labor." Smithfield's vice president, Dennis Treacy, similarly criticized the report, faulting it for reporting on violations from a decade ago rather than recent and relevant circumstances.

When asked about the pace of poultry processing in their plants, Tyson Foods official told the Human Rights Watch that the speed of their lines conform to federal regulations. According to the officials, "line speed varies depending on the type of product," and is regulated by the USDA. While the historical standard speed was slower, it increased with automation which Tyson officials said results in "much less hand work."

== Implications for workers ==
The meat production industry employs thousands of low-wage workers who are at risk of being exposed to physical and psychological dangers.

=== Physical ===
The significant demand for meat has imposed large quotas on slaughterhouse workers. The work is physically demanding and difficult, based on repetitive motions. Meatpacking workers might need to make a cut every two to three seconds: this comes out to approximately ten thousand cuts over an eight-hour shift. In addition to working with knives, meatpacking employees often have to repeatedly lift and move heavy objects during a shift and are exposed to dangerous machinery. An employee at Excel (a division of Cargill Meat Solutions) reported lifting bags of meat weighing up to forty pounds every three seconds, while other accounts from meatpacking workers indicate that some jobs including flipping an entire hog. A hog slaughtering plant manager went on record during an unfair labor practice trial as saying, "there is a lot of heavy lifting and repetitive work." Consequently, according to data published by the Drake Journal of Agricultural Law, approximately 25% of meatpacking workers are injured or become ill each year. Records of workplace injuries in Iowa showed a yearly average of 9.8 injuries per group of hundred full-time employees; there were an average of 51 injuries or illnesses per hundred meatpacking employees each year. According to the U.S. Bureau of Labor Statistics, the rate of injury and illness for the meatpacking industry is double the average of other American manufacturing jobs.

While the types of injuries vary, lacerations are the most common. Workers often accidentally stab either themselves or fellow employees who are nearby. Other common health problems include workers developing tendonitis, cumulative trauma disorders, carpal tunnel, back and shoulder problems, and "trigger finger" - a condition in which a finger is frozen in a curled position. In addition, dull or worn knives place additional pressure on workers' tendons, joints, and nerves.

Another "commonplace hazard and source of injury" is the wet floors of meat production plants. A health care provider who services poultry industry workers in Northwest Arkansas told the Human Rights Watch, "I see leg and knee injuries too from people slipping on the wet surface, fighting to keep their balance."

=== Psychological ===
Typical slaughterhouses are fast-paced. The production is fast-paced and does not allow time to ensure the animals do not suffer. According to a 2008 study in the Georgetown Journal on Poverty Law and Policy, the pain and terror animals go through in their final moments create "an employment situation ripe for psychological problems." Another study by Rachel McNair (2002) suggests that slaughterhouse workers may be susceptible to perception-induced traumatic stress, and their situation merits close study. Perpetration-induced traumatic stress (PITS) is a form of post-traumatic stress disorder (PTSD) in which psychological damage arises "from situations that would be traumatic if someone were a victim, but situations for which a person was a causal participant." Essentially, by being involved in creating the traumatic situation, a victim of PITS would suffer PTSD symptoms, including anxiety, panic, depression, increased paranoia, or disassociation. All these symptoms are tied to the psychological consequences of the act of killing.

According to the 2008 study in the Georgetown Journal on Poverty Law and Policy, there is ample anecdotal evidence of slaughterhouse workers exhibiting symptoms of PITS. First, the study asserts the substance abuse that is characteristics of PITS is prevalent among slaughterhouse workers. Second, it cites reports workers recounted of nightmares relating to slaughterhouse work. "Virgil Butler, a long-time slaughterhouse worker, recalled having nightmares of chickens and reported a fellow worker being 'hauled off to the mental hospital' for severe recurring dreams."

== Policy protections ==
=== Human rights standards ===
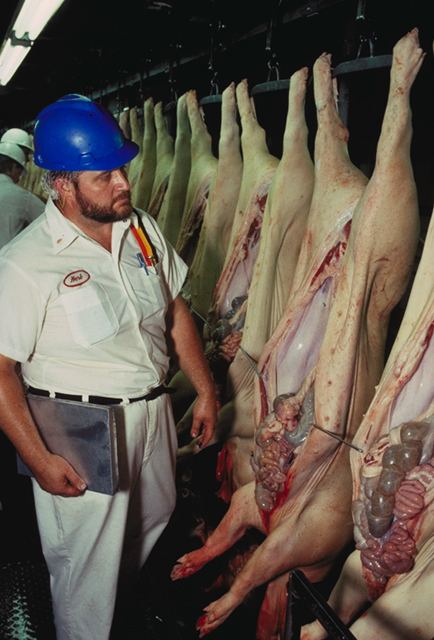
USDA officer inspects pork production

There are several international human rights protections for the workplace. The Universal Declaration of Human Rights and the United Nations' International Covenant on Economic, Social and Cultural Rights both called for just and safe conditions of work. In 1981, the International Labour Organization (ILO) wrote the Occupation Safety and Health Convention No. 155, which calls for national policies that minimize the hazards of the working environment. Other aspects of the ILO's workplace safety conventions maintain standards of workers' compensation in the event of injury; the ILO calls for legal protections and regulations that offer fully paid medical care and rehabilitation for workers disabled or injured while on the job, as well as compensation for time taken off due to workplace injuries.

According to a study by the Human Rights Watch, "the human rights standard for workplace safety and health centers on the principle that workers have a right to work in an environment reasonably free from predictable, preventable, serious risks." While such standards do not require countries to eliminate all risks - whether major or minor - workers do have the right to know that when they go to work and complete their tasks, "they will be able to leave the workplace at the end of the day with life and limb intact."

=== U.S. law ===
OSHA agency logo

American workplace protections laws generally conform to international labor standards. The Occupational Safety and Health Act of 1970 established the Occupational Safety and Health Administration (OSHA), an agency of the United States Department of Labor that set and mandated national standards for workplace safety. The Act gave OSHA several critical powers including the ability to inspect workplaces for noncompliance, impose penalties for safety violations, and remove a health or safety hazard. When determining fines, the agency has wide discretion: OSHA considers many factors including the employer's previous compliance with safety standards, size, good faith, and the severity of the violation. OSHA standards apply to all workers, included those who are undocumented or not citizens.

There have been more recent legislative responses to the concerns of labor advocates. In 2000, the former Nebraska Governor Michael Johanns (who later served as U.S. Secretary of Agriculture) issued the "Nebraska Meatpacking Industry Workers Bill of Rights," which recognized an employee's right to organize, work in safe conditions and access state and federal benefits. In 2001, Congress overturned some OSHA ergonomics standards that had been approved by the Clinton administration. President Bush signed the repeal.

== Childhood ==
The US meatpacking industry has come under increasing scrutiny following a high-profile national child labour investigation. In November 2022, the Department of Labor (DOL) launched an inquiry into child labour violations involving the cleaning subcontractor Packers Sanitation Services Inc. (PSSI). Since then, further developments have drawn attention to broader labour standards across the sector. As investigations have progressed, the prospect of US government action to hold companies legally accountable has heightened the industry's exposure to regulatory, legal, and reputational risks, with these risks continuing to grow as additional findings emerge.

The rise in child labour in the United States is closely associated with the widespread use of subcontracting. Meat companies often fail to disclose the number of subcontracted workers within their operations, with only one out of seven companies reporting these figures. As a result, investors are unable to accurately evaluate their exposure to the risks linked to these insecure employment arrangements, including child labour and other forms of labour exploitation.

== See also ==
- Animal–industrial complex
- Impact of the COVID-19 pandemic on the meat industry in the United States
- World Scientists' Warning to Humanity
