= Georgetown Journal =

Georgetown Journal may refer to:

- Georgetown Journal of International Affairs
- Georgetown Journal on Poverty Law and Policy
- Georgetown Law Journal
