= NLRB v. Truck Drivers Local 449 =

- Supreme Court of the United States

Argued January 17, 22, 1957 Decided April 1, 1957
- Full case name: National Labor Relations Board v. Truck Drivers Local Union No. 449, International Brotherhood of Teamsters, Chauffeurs, Warehousemen and Helps of America, A.F.L.
- Citations: 353 U.S. 87 (more) 77 S. Ct. 643; 1 L. Ed. 2d 676; 1957 U.S. LEXIS 1629

Case history
- Prior: Truck Drivers Local 449 v. NLRB, 231 F.2d 110 (2d Cir. 1956); cert. granted, 352 U.S. 818 (1956).

Holding
- A temporary lockout to preserve the multi-employer bargaining basis from the disintegration threatened by the union's strike action was lawful under the Taft-Hartley Act

Court membership
- Chief Justice Earl Warren Associate Justices Hugo Black · Felix Frankfurter; William O. Douglas · Harold H. Burton; Tom C. Clark · John M. Harlan II; William J. Brennan Jr. · Charles E. Whittaker

Case opinion
- Majority: Brennan, joined by Warren, Black, Frankfurter, Douglas, Burton, Clark, Harlan
- Whittaker took no part in the consideration or decision of the case.

Laws applied
- National Labor Relations Act, Taft-Hartley Act

NLRB v. Truck Drivers Local 449 (Buffalo Linen Supply Co.), 353 U.S. 87 (1957), is an 8-0 decision by the Supreme Court of the United States in which the Court held that a temporary lockout by a multi-employer bargaining group threatened by a whipsaw strike was lawful under the National Labor Relations Act (NLRA), as amended by the Taft-Hartley Act.

== Background ==
The International Brotherhood of Teamsters had organized truck drivers working for linen supply and laundry companies in and around Buffalo, New York, in the early 1930s. In 1934, eight of the employers formed the Linen and Credit Exchange, a multi-employer association to act as a collective bargaining agent for the employers. A first contract with the Exchange was negotiated, and successor contracts also agreed to and implemented.

The most recent contract was due to expire on April 30, 1953, but no successor contract was negotiated. Negotiations continued slowly. Finally, the Teamsters engaged in a whipsaw strike against one of the employers, Frontier Linen Supply, on May 26, 1953. The following day, the other seven employers locked out their truck drivers. A week later, a new collective bargaining agreement was signed, the lockout ended, and the locked out workers rehired.

But the Teamsters filed an unfair labor practice (ULP) charge against the seven employers alleging that the lockout violated Section 8(a)(1) and 8(a)(3) of the National Labor Relations Act. The trial examiner, now called administrative law judge, concluded that a ULP had been committed; but, the five-member National Labor Relations Board (Board) overruled the examiner. The Board concluded the lockout was defensive, not retaliatory, and therefore lawful.

The union appealed the Board's ruling. The Second Circuit Court of Appeals held (231 F.2d 110) that the strike was an economic strike, not an unfair labor practice strike, and hence not protected by the Section 8 of the NLRA. However, the appellate court concluded that a temporary lockout based on the perceived threat of a strike could be justified only if a strike would impose an unusual economic hardship on the employer. Since none of the seven employers had demonstrated such hardship, the Court of Appeals ruled that the employers had committed a ULP.

The NLRB appealed to the Supreme Court, which granted certiorari.

== Decision ==
Associate Justice William J. Brennan, Jr. delivered the unanimous opinion of the Court. Justice Charles Evans Whittaker took no part in the oral argument or decision.

Nearly half of the short decision is taken up by Brennan's review of the collective bargaining history between the Exchange and the Teamsters, the arguments before the NLRB board agent, and the ruling of the Court of Appeals.

Justice Brennan opened his argument by observing that although the NLRA does not mention lockouts, it also does not prohibit them. Citing no evidence, Brennan then asserted that the legislative history of the NLRA did not indicate any intention by Congress to ban lockouts. Inclusion of the term in the Taft-Hartley Act, the majority found, indicated congressional recognition of the lockout and implied that there were circumstances in which a lockout might be legally employed.

Brennan next addressed the issue before the Court. "The narrow question to be decided," he wrote, "is whether a temporary lockout may lawfully be used as a defense to a union strike tactic which threatens the destruction of the employers' interest in bargaining on a group basis."

The Exchange and the Board had argued that preservation of the cohesiveness of the multi-employer association justified use of the lockout. The Court of Appeals had rejected that argument. Reviewing the legislative history of the Taft-Hartley Act, the appellate court found that Congress had deferred judgment on the legality of multi-employer bargaining units to a commission. Brennan rejected the finding of the Court of Appeals. Reviewing the academic literature on the history of collective bargaining in the 20th century as well as the legislative history of the Taft-Hartley Act, Brennan found that multi-employer bargaining not only pre-dated the Taft-Hartley Act but that Congress had considered and rejected language limiting or banning such bargaining. The "compelling conclusion," Brennan wrote, is that Congress intended to let the NLRB make case-by-case decisions as to the wisdom of permitting multi-employer bargaining.

In the decision's final two paragraphs, the majority drew an important conclusion from the foregoing. Citing NLRB v. Mackay Radio & Telegraph Co., 304 U.S. 333 (1938), among others, Brennan held that the NLRA's protection of the right to strike is not absolute. Balancing the rights of union members to strike against the right of employers to preserve the multi-employer bargaining unit, Brennan asserted (without additional argument or evidence) that the appellate court had erred in establishing an "economic hardship" test for lockouts. Then the Supreme Court deferred to the Board's ruling, and concluded that "a temporary lockout to preserve the multi-employer bargaining basis from the disintegration threatened by the Union's strike action was lawful."

== Additional rulings and assessment ==
NLRB v. Truck Drivers Local 449 (Buffalo Linen Supply Co.) is one of a number of Supreme Court cases stemming from the Court's 1938 decision in NLRB v. Mackay Radio & Telegraph Co.

Building on its ruling in Buffalo Linen Supply Co., the Supreme Court held in American Ship Building v. NLRB that an employer may lock out its employees without violating the NLRA if a bargaining impasse has been reached and the lockout is for the purpose of applying economic pressure to support the employer's bargaining position. However, the employer cannot hire permanent replacements, only temporary ones. The high court further extended its reasoning in NLRB v. Brown Food Stores, holding that an employer could lock out its employees in advance of a whipsaw strike so long as the employer only utilized temporary replacements and locked out all workers (not just those who supported the union).

Buffalo Linen Supply Co. has not itself been the focus of much academic or legal analysis. However, it is often referred to in general discussions of the Court's labor relations jurisprudence. Buffalo Linen Supply Co. is one of many post-Mackay Radio rulings criticized as a Court-approved infringement on the right to strike.

== See also ==
- List of United States Supreme Court cases, volume 353
