= Sure-Tan, Inc. v. NLRB =

- Supreme Court of the United States

Argued December 6, 1983 Decided June 25, 1984
- Full case name: Sure-Tan, Inc. v. National Labor Relations Board
- Citations: 467 U.S. 883 (more) 104 S. Ct. 2803; 81 L. Ed. 2d 732
- Argument: Oral argument

Case history
- Prior: NLRB v. Sure-Tan, Inc., 672 F.2d 592 (7th Cir. 1982); rehearing denied, 677 F.2d 584 (7th Cir. 1982); cert. granted, 460 U.S. 1021 (1983).

Court membership
- Chief Justice Warren E. Burger Associate Justices William J. Brennan Jr. · Byron White; Thurgood Marshall · Harry Blackmun; Lewis F. Powell Jr. · William Rehnquist; John P. Stevens · Sandra Day O'Connor

Case opinions
- Majority: O'Connor, joined by Burger, White (in full); Brennan, Marshall, Blackmun, Stevens (Parts I-III); Powell, Rehnquist (Part IV)
- Concur/dissent: Brennan, joined by Marshall, Blackmun, Stevens
- Concur/dissent: Powell, joined by Rehnquist

Laws applied
- National Labor Relations Act of 1935

Sure-Tan, Inc. v. National Labor Relations Board, 467 U.S. 883 (1984) is a United States labor law case that resulted in a split decision before the Supreme Court of the United States. By a 7-2 majority, the Court ruled that undocumented immigrant workers were “employees” covered by the National Labor Relations Act of 1935 (NLRA). However, by a 5-4 majority the Court ruled that the National Labor Relations Board (NLRB) was limited in its remedies for penalizing employers who fired undocumented workers for union organizing in violation of the NLRA. The decision was one of a series limiting the rights of immigrant workers and the power of the NLRB culminating with Hoffman Plastic Compounds, Inc. v. NLRB.

Sure-Tan, Inc. was a small leather processing company in Chicago, Illinois. Workers at the company, several of whom were undocumented immigrants from Mexico, voted to unionize in late 1976. After the NLRB’s certification of the election in January 1977, the company’s owner wrote to the Immigration and Naturalization Service (INS) and named five union supporters who might be undocumented. The company also fired non-immigrant employees who were union supporters. In February 1977, the INS raided the firm and deported the five workers. The NLRB charged the company with violating the workers' right to organize and ordered the company to rehire the workers with back pay for the lost work from the date of their arrest by the INS.

Justice O’Connor delivered the decision for the US Supreme Court and ruled that undocumented workers were fully covered by the NLRA, but reinstatement and back pay could not be assessed because the workers, who had been deported to Mexico, were unavailable for work. Justices Brennan, Marshall, Blackmun, and Stevens concurred that undocumented workers are employees under the NLRA but dissented from back pay portion of the decision by arguing that the NLRB had acted properly. Justices Powell and Rehnquist dissented from the opinion that undocumented workers are employees under the NLRA but concurred with the decision to deny back pay to deported undocumented workers.
