= Ida Klaus =

American lawyer

- Born: 1905; Brooklyn, New York
- Died: 1999 (aged 93–94)
- Occupation: Labor lawyer

Ida Klaus (1905–1999) was an American labor lawyer, known by the press in the 1950s and 1960s as the woman "who thinks with a man’s brain."

She was born in New York City, and graduated Phi Beta Kappa from Hunter College and the Teachers Institute of the Jewish Theological Seminary of America. But Columbia University Law School refused to admit her because she was a woman, and she taught Hebrew until 1928. In 1928 she became one of six women accepted into Columbia University Law School's first coed class, and she graduated from there in 1931.

She served as a research assistant to Columbia law professor Herman Oliphant, and was later recruited by him as one of America's ten most promising lawyers to work for President Franklin D. Roosevelt’s New Deal. She worked as a review lawyer for the National Labor Relations Board in Washington. In 1948, she became solicitor for the National Labor Relations Board, which made her the highest-ranking female lawyer in the federal government. She then was hired as counsel to the New York City Department of Labor under Mayor Robert F. Wagner Jr.; it was in this job that she wrote the Little Wagner Act, which is the New York City version of the Wagner Act. She also wrote the Mayor's executive order creating the first detailed code of labor relations for New York City employees.

In 1961 she worked in President Kennedy's administration as chief adviser for the first labor relations task force for federal employees.

She was the chief labor negotiator for New York City's Board of Education and director of staff relations from 1962 until 1975. In 1975 she left to become a private arbitrator. From 1978 to 1985 she served as a member of the New York Public Employment Relations Board. In 1980 President Jimmy Carter appointed her as one of the three negotiators in the Long Island Rail Road strike.

She received Columbia Law School's Medal for Excellence in 1996, and an honorary doctorate in 1994 from the Jewish Theological Seminary.
