= Mackay Radio =

American radio and telegraph company

Mackay Radio refers to a group of closely related radio communications firms, also commonly known as the Mackay Companies, and the Mackay Radio and Telegraph Company. An American company, Mackay was a major early provider of radiotelegraph services, including international communication and shipboard services.

== History ==
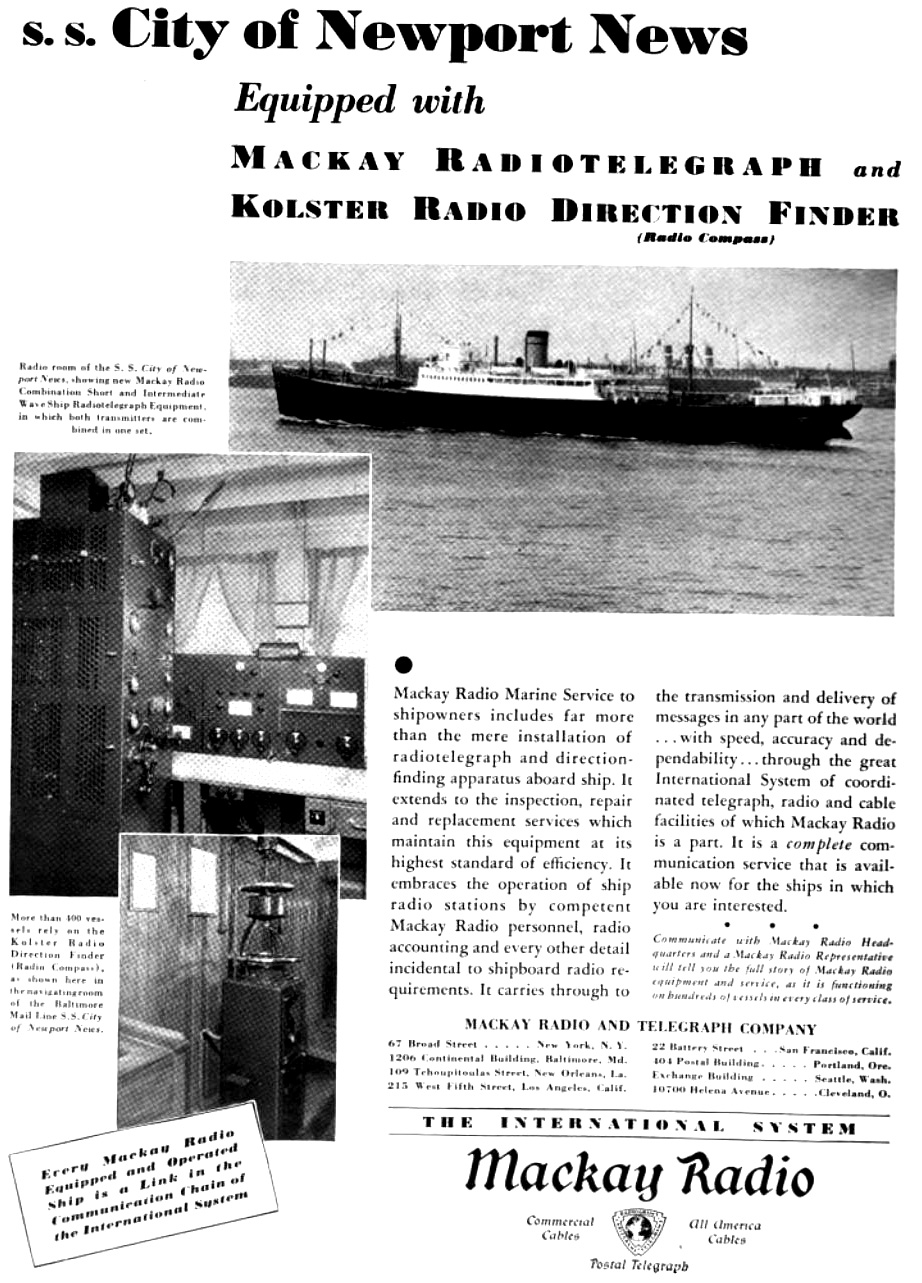
1932 company advertisement.

The company was established in 1925 in Nevada by Clarence H. Mackay, as an expansion of his father John Mackay's legacy in telegraph and cable communications.

In 1927, the Federal Telegraph Company was acquired, which was renamed the Mackay Radio and Telegraph Company (California). In 1928, the International Telephone and Telegraph Company (ITT) gained control of the Mackay companies, which were placed under the newly formed Postal Telegraph and Cable Corporation. Mackay's president, Clarence H. Mackay, became Postal's chairman, and was added to the ITT board of directors and executive committee.

During World War II, Mackay established a mobile "press station dispatching news from the European battle theatre". In March 1945, Mackay and RCA Communications were described as the only U.S. firms rendering "anything approximating a world-wide service".

The company was divested in 1987, becoming Mackay Communications, Inc., located in Raleigh, North Carolina.

== National Labor Relations Board case ==
Following an unsuccessful strike in 1935, Mackay retained some of the strike-breaking workers, which the National Labor Relations Board protested was an unfair labor practice. In 1938 the dispute was reviewed by the U.S. Supreme Court, which ruled in favor of the company.

== Radio Corporation of America v China arbitration ==
In 1928, The Radio Corporation of America (RCA) received a concession to link the United States with China. In 1932, Mackay received a similar concession, which RCA challenged, on the grounds that it had been given exclusive rights. However, arbitration ruled in Mackay's favor.
