= Machinists v. Wisconsin Employment Relations Commission =

- Supreme Court of the United States

Argued March 22, 1976 Decided June 25, 1976
- Full case name: Lodge 76, International Association of Machinists & Aerospace Workers, AFL-CIO v. Wisconsin Employment Relations Commission
- Docket no.: 75-185
- Citations: 427 U.S. 132 (more) 96 S. Ct. 2548; 49 L. Ed. 2d 396

Case history
- Prior: On writ of certiorari to the Wisconsin Supreme Court

Holding
- The union's concerted refusal to work overtime was peaceful conduct constituting activity that must be free of state regulation if the congressional intent in enacting the comprehensive federal law of labor relations is not to be frustrated.

Court membership
- Chief Justice Warren E. Burger Associate Justices William J. Brennan Jr. · Potter Stewart; Byron White · Thurgood Marshall; Harry Blackmun · Lewis F. Powell Jr. William Rehnquist · John P. Stevens

Case opinions
- Majority: Brennan, joined by Burger, White, Marshall, Blackmun, Powell
- Concurrence: Powell, joined by Burger
- Dissent: Stevens, joined by Stewart, Rehnquist

Machinists v. Wisconsin Employment Relations Commission, 427 U.S. 132 (1976), is a United States labor law case, concerning the scope of federal preemption against state law for labor rights.

== Facts ==
The Wisconsin Employment Relations Commission sought to hold a union liable for an unfair labor practice, by refusing to work overtime. An employer claimed to the National Labor Relations Board that his staff had committed an unfair practice by refusing to work overtime, but this was dismissed, as there was no violation. The employer then tried to make the same claim to the Wisconsin Employment Relations Commission, which upheld the claim and made a cease-and-desist order against the union. The Wisconsin Circuit Court affirmed this and so did the Wisconsin Supreme Court affirmed. The union appealed to the US Supreme Court.

== Judgment ==
Justice Brennan held that the Wisconsin Supreme Court had not been entitled to make a ruling against the union, because its jurisdiction was preempted by the National Labor Relations Act. Such matters were to be left to "be controlled by the free play of economic forces". The judgment included the following.

We consider first pre-emption based predominantly on the primary jurisdiction of the Board. This line of pre-emption analysis was developed in San Diego Unions v. Garmon, supra, and its history was recently summarized in Amalgamated Association of Street, Electric Railway & Motor Coach Employees v. Lockridge, 403 U.S. 274, 290-291, 91 S.Ct. 1909, 1920, 29 L.Ed.2d 473 (1971):

"(V)arying approaches were taken by the Court in initially grappling with this pre-emption problem. Thus, for example, some early cases suggested the true distinction lay between judicial application of general common law, which was permissible, as opposed to state rules specifically designed to regulate labor relations, which were pre-empted. See, e. g., Automobile Workers v. Russell, 356 U.S. 634, 645[1958] USSC 138; 78 S.Ct. 932, 2 L.Ed.2d 1030 (1958). Others made pre-emption turn on whether the States purported to apply a remedy not provided for by the federal scheme, e. g., Weber v. Anheuser-Busch, Inc., 34U.S. 468, 479-480, 75 S.Ct. 480, 99 L.Ed. 546 (1955), while in still others the Court undertook a thorough scrutiny of the federal Act to ascertain whether the state courts had, in fact, arrived at conclusions inconsistent with its provisions, E. g., Automobile Workers v. Wisconsin Employment Relations Bd., 336 U.S. 245, 69 S.Ct. 516, 93 L.Ed. 651 (1949). . . . (N)one of these approaches proved satisfactory, however, and each was ultimately abandoned. It was, in short, experience not pure logic which initially taught that each of these methods sacrificed important federal interests in a uniform law of labor relations centrally administered by an expert agency without yielding anything in return by way of predictability or ease of judicial application."

The failure of alternative analyses and the interplay of the foregoing policy considerations, then, led this Court to hold in Garmon, 359 U.S., at 244, 79 S.Ct. 773:

"'When it is clear or may fairly be assumed that the activities which a State purports to regulate are protected by § 7 of the National Labor Relations Act, or constitute an unfair labor practice under § 8, due regard for the federal enactment requires that state jurisdiction must yield. To leave the States free to regulate conduct so plainly within the central aim of federal regulation involves too great a danger of conflict between power asserted by Congress and requirements imposed by state law.'"

See also San Diego Unions v. Garmon, 359 U.S., at 244-247, 79 S.Ct., at 779-781; Lockridge, supra, 403 U.S., at 286-290, 91 S.Ct., at 1917-1920.

However, a second line of pre-emption analysis has been developed in cases focusing upon the crucial inquiry whether Congress intended that the conduct involved be unregulated because left "to be controlled by the free play of economic forces." NLRB v. Nash-Finch Co., 404 U.S. 138, 144, 92 S.Ct. 373, 377, 30 L.Ed.2d 328 (1971).^{4} Concededly this inquiry was not made in 1949 in the so-called Briggs-Stratton case, Automobile Workers v. Wisconsin Emp. Rel. Board, 336 U.S. 245, 69 S.Ct. 516, 93 L.Ed. 651 (1949), the decision of this Court heavily relied upon by the court below in reaching its decision that state regulation of the conduct at issue is not pre-empted by national labor law. In Briggs-Stratton, the union, in order to bring pressure on the employer during negotiations, adopted a plan whereby union meetings were called at irregular times during working hours without advance notice to the employer or any notice as to whether or when the workers would return. In a proceeding under the Wisconsin Employment Peace Act, the Wisconsin Employment Relations Board issued an order forbidding the union and its members to engage in concerted efforts to interfere with production by those methods. This Court did not inquire whether Congress meant that such methods should be reserved to the union "to be controlled by the free play of economic forces." Rather, because these methods were "neither made a right under federal law nor a violation if it" the Court held that there "was no basis for denying to Wisconsin the power, in governing her internal affairs, to regulate" such conduct. Id., at 265, 69 S.Ct., at 527.

^4 See Cox, Labor Law Preemption Revisited, 85 Harv.L.Rev. 1337, 1352 (1972):

"An appreciation of the true character of the national labor policy expressed in the NLRA and the LMRA indicates that in providing a legal framework for union organization, collective bargaining, and the conduct of labor disputes, Congress struck a balance of protection, prohibition, and laissez-faire in respect to union organization, collective bargaining, and labor disputes that would be upset if a state could also enforce statutes or rules of decision resting upon its views concerning accommodation of the same interests."

Cf. Lesnick, Preemption Reconsidered: The Apparent Reaffirmation of Garmon, 72 Col.L.Rev. 469, 478, 480 (1972):

"(T)he failure of Congress to prohibit certain conduct warrant(s a) negative inference that it was deemed proper, indeed desirable at least, desirable to be left for the free play of contending economic forces. Thus, the state is not merely filling a gap when it outlaws what federal law fails to outlaw; it is denying one party to an economic contest a weapon that Congress meant him to have available.

"The premise is . . . that Congress judged whether the conduct was illicit or legitimate, and that 'legitimate' connotes, not simply that federal law is neutral, but that the conduct is to be assimilated to the large residual area in which a regime of free collective bargaining 'economic warfare,' if you prefer is thought to be the course of regulatory wisdom."

== See also ==
- United States labor law
