= Whipsaw strike =

Type of trade union strike

A whipsaw strike (also called a selective strike) is a strike by a trade union against only one or a few employers in an industry or a multi-employer association at a time. The strike is often of a short duration, and usually recurs during the labor dispute or contract negotiations—hence the name "whipsaw".

== Multi-employer bargaining ==
As unionization spreads in an industry, unions often attempt to encourage employers in that industry to bargain as a group. The goal is to negotiate an industry-wide contract which equalizes pay across employers, forcing businesses to compete on the basis of quality, innovation, and occupational safety and health. This activity is known as multi-employer bargaining. Multi-employer bargaining has been common in the United States and other countries since the 1880s. It is more common in heavily unionized industries such as construction, steelmaking and transportation; where there is high turnover due to the nature of the job (such as construction and longshore operations); and where numerous small employers face a powerful labor union. Although increasingly rare in the private sector in the United Kingdom, multi-employer bargaining remains common in Western Europe (especially in Germany), Scandinavia, Japan, and some South American countries (such as Brazil, Chile, Mexico, Peru and Uruguay). Canada, for example, encourages multi-employer bargaining by law.

Employers face an economic incentive to break away from the employer bargaining group. If the employer does so and is able to negotiate a contract with lower labor costs, that employer will achieve a significant competitive advantage in the marketplace.

== Whipsaw strike in multi-employer bargaining ==
To discourage employers from breaking away from the bargaining group, unions developed the whipsaw strike. In a whipsaw strike, the union strikes one employer (or just a few employers) in the multi-employer bargaining group. The strike is usually of a short duration (a few days or a week at most). The union strikes employer after employer. Strikes may occur one after another and may overlap, or there may be long lulls between strikes. The same employer may be struck repeatedly, with sometimes as little as 24 hours between strikes.

The goal of a whipsaw strike may vary. In some cases, the strike is conducted only against an employer the union believes is considering quitting the employer association. In other cases, the job action is conducted against a strong employer who is committed to staying in the employer group. The strike serves as an example to keep other, weaker businesses (which have a greater incentive to leave the employer group) in line. Sometimes, a whipsaw strike is used as a bargaining tool. For example, the strike may be directed at an employer or employers in the group which the union believes are holding up an agreement, or to keep employers off balance in negotiations, weaken the employer group's economic strength, and exercise the union's economic power.

== Employer responses and legality ==
Employer reactions to whipsaw strikes vary widely. In some countries which ban worker strikes, the whipsaw strike is illegal and employers are able to work with government law enforcement officials to end its use. In countries where the whipsaw strike is permitted, employers often counter this form of strike by locking out all employees who work for the employer association and using strikebreakers to provide temporary or permanent replacements.

Few nations have addressed the use of lockouts during whipsaw strikes, however. In the United States, the Supreme Court has ruled on the legality of the practice. The question before the Court was whether a lockout during a whipsaw strike was an unfair labor practice (ULP) under the National Labor Relations Act and its various amendments. In NLRB v. Truck Drivers Local 449 ("Buffalo Linen Supply Co."), 353 U.S. 87 (1957), the Court held that such a lockout was not a ULP. The high court further extended this ruling in NLRB v. Brown Food Stores, 380 U.S. 278 (1965), holding that an employer could engage in a partial lockout of its employees in advance of a whipsaw strike so long as the employer only utilized temporary replacements and locked out all workers (not just those who supported the union).
