= Golden State Transit Corp. v. City of Los Angeles =

Golden State Transit Corp. v. Los Angeles
- Supreme Court of the United States

Argued December 4, 1985 Decided April 1, 1986
- Full case name: Golden State Transit Corp. v. City of Los Angeles
- Citations: 475 U.S. 608 (more) 106 S. Ct. 1395; 89 L. Ed. 2d 616

Holding
- The city's action in conditioning petitioner's franchise renewal on the settlement of the labor dispute is preempted by the NLRA.

Court membership
- Chief Justice Warren E. Burger Associate Justices William J. Brennan Jr. · Byron White; Thurgood Marshall · Harry Blackmun; Lewis F. Powell Jr. · William Rehnquist; John P. Stevens · Sandra Day O'Connor

Case opinions
- Majority: Blackmun, joined by Burger, Brennan, White, Marshall, Powell, Stevens, O'Connor
- Dissent: Rehnquist

Laws applied
- National Labor Relations Act

Golden State Transit Corp v City of Los Angeles, 475 U.S. 608 (1986), is a US labor law case, concerning the scope of federal preemption against state law for labor rights. The court held that a city's conditioning of an entity's franchise renewal of the settlement of a labor dispute is preempted by the National Labor Relations Act.

== Facts ==
Golden State Transit Corp claimed that the City of Los Angeles was preempted by the National Labor Relations Act of 1935 from refusing to renew its franchise license to operate taxicabs in the city. During its application, its cab drivers went on strike for higher wages and better working conditions. The Teamsters Union put pressure on the city to not renew the license. Because the dispute was not settled, the franchise expired. The Federal District Court held that the city was entitled to not renew the license. The Court of Appeals affirmed this judgment. Golden State Transit Corp appealed.

== Opinion of the court ==
A majority of the Supreme Court held that Los Angeles was not entitled to refuse to renew a taxi company's franchise license because the Teamsters Union had pressured it not to until a dispute was resolved. Justice Harry Blackmun gave the judgment.

Justice William Rehnquist dissented.

== Later developments ==
The case returned to the Supreme Court in a 1989 case of the same name, 493 U.S. 103.

== See also ==
- United States labor law
