= Hoffman Plastic Compounds, Inc. v. NLRB =

- Supreme Court of the United States

Argued January 15, 2002 Decided March 27, 2002
- Full case name: Hoffman Plastic Compounds, Inc. v. National Labor Relations Board
- Docket no.: 00-1595
- Citations: 535 U.S. 137 (more) 122 S. Ct. 1275; 152 L. Ed. 2d 271; 2002 U.S. LEXIS 2147; 70 U.S.L.W. 4209; 145 Lab. Cas. (CCH) ¶ 11,230; 169 L.R.R.M. 2769; 2002 Cal. Daily Op. Service 2731; 2002 Daily Journal DAR 3304; 15 Fla. L. Weekly Fed. S 178

Case history
- Prior: On writ of certiorari to the United States Court of Appeals for the District of Columbia Circuit

Holding
- Federal immigration policy barred the NLRB from awarding backpay to a worker who had never been authorized to work in the United States.

Court membership
- Chief Justice William Rehnquist Associate Justices John P. Stevens · Sandra Day O'Connor; Antonin Scalia · Anthony Kennedy; David Souter · Clarence Thomas; Ruth Bader Ginsburg · Stephen Breyer

Case opinions
- Majority: Rehnquist, joined by O'Connor, Scalia, Kennedy, Thomas
- Dissent: Breyer, joined by Stevens, Souter, Ginsburg

Laws applied
- National Labor Relations Act; Immigration Reform and Control Act of 1986

Hoffman Plastic Compounds, Inc. v. National Labor Relations Board, 535 U.S. 137 (2002), is a United States Supreme Court decision about compensation for a worker who lacked permission to work in the country. The Court overturned an award of backpay to José Castro, who had been fired for supporting a union. Backpay in this case meant the wages he would have earned after his unlawful firing.

The National Labor Relations Board (NLRB), the federal agency that enforces the National Labor Relations Act (NLRA), found that Hoffman had unlawfully fired Castro because of his union activity. Castro had obtained the job using a friend's birth certificate and had never been authorized to work in the United States.

In a 5–4 decision, the Court held that awarding Castro backpay would conflict with federal immigration policy under the Immigration Reform and Control Act of 1986 (IRCA). Chief Justice William Rehnquist wrote the majority opinion, joined by Justices Sandra Day O'Connor, Antonin Scalia, Anthony Kennedy, and Clarence Thomas.

Justice Stephen Breyer wrote a dissent, an opinion disagreeing with the Court's ruling, joined by Justices John Paul Stevens, David Souter, and Ruth Bader Ginsburg. They argued that denying backpay could make unlawful firings less costly and encourage employers to hire workers without permission to work.

== Facts ==
Hoffman Plastic Compounds made chemical mixtures for other manufacturers. In May 1988, it hired Castro to operate blending machines after he presented documents that appeared to show he could legally work in the United States.

In December 1988, the United Rubber, Cork, Linoleum and Plastic Workers of America, AFL–CIO, began trying to organize a union at the plant. Castro and several coworkers supported the effort and distributed cards showing support for union representation.

Hoffman laid off Castro and other union supporters in January 1989. In January 1992, the NLRB found that the company had unlawfully chosen four employees for layoff because they supported the union. It ordered the company to offer them their jobs back and pay their lost wages.

At a June 1993 hearing about the amount of backpay, Castro testified that he was born in Mexico and had never been legally admitted to, or authorized to work in, the United States. He also said that he had used a friend's birth certificate to obtain employment.

The administrative law judge, who heard the evidence for the agency, ruled that Castro could receive neither backpay nor reinstatement, meaning an offer to return to his job. In 1998, the NLRB changed the backpay decision and awarded him $66,951 plus interest. That amount covered the period from his firing until Hoffman learned of his immigration status. The Board did not restore the order to offer Castro his job back.

Hoffman challenged the payment order in the United States Court of Appeals for the District of Columbia Circuit. A panel of judges, and then the full court, upheld it. The Supreme Court agreed to hear the case in 2001.

=== National Labor Relations Act ===
The National Labor Relations Act was enacted in 1935. Section 7 protects the right of employees covered by the law to form or join unions and to act together to improve their working conditions. It also protects collective bargaining, in which workers negotiate with an employer through representatives they choose.

Section 8(a)(3) prohibits employers from treating employees differently to encourage or discourage union membership. Section 10(c) lets the NLRB order employers to correct violations, including by offering employees their jobs back or paying lost wages. These forms of relief are called remedies. In Hoffman, the Supreme Court considered whether backpay was available to Castro; it did not overturn the finding that the anti-union layoffs were unlawful.

=== Immigration Reform and Control Act ===
The Immigration Reform and Control Act of 1986 changed federal immigration law by requiring employers to check employees' identity and permission to work. It also prohibited employers from knowingly hiring, or continuing to employ, people without work authorization. Employers can face civil penalties, and a pattern or practice of knowingly violating the employment restrictions can lead to criminal penalties.

Federal law also makes it a crime to knowingly use certain false documents, or documents belonging to someone else, to satisfy employment-verification requirements. Castro's use of another person's birth certificate was part of the Supreme Court's reasoning.

== Judgment ==
=== Majority opinion ===
The Court ruled that the NLRB could not award Castro backpay for work he had not performed after his firing. The majority treated IRCA as central to the case. It reasoned that the Board's power to correct labor-law violations did not allow it to award pay that Castro could not legally have earned. In the majority's view, the award would excuse earlier immigration-law violations and encourage future ones.

The Court also discussed Sure-Tan, Inc. v. NLRB (1984). That decision recognized that undocumented workers were employees protected by the NLRA, but limited the remedies available when they conflicted with immigration law. Congress enacted IRCA two years later. The Hoffman majority relied on this change in the law without deciding whether Sure-Tan alone required denying Castro backpay.

Hoffman still had to obey orders to stop violating the NLRA and to post notices explaining employees' rights and the company's violations. The Court said that those orders, backed by possible court sanctions for disobedience, could enforce labor law even without a backpay award.

=== Dissent ===
Breyer argued that IRCA did not expressly prohibit backpay and that the NLRB could award it without undermining immigration policy. In his view, the possibility of receiving compensation after an unlawful firing was too uncertain to motivate someone to immigrate without authorization. Denying backpay, however, could reduce the cost of breaking labor law and give employers a reason to hire workers without work authorization. He therefore argued that the award would support, rather than frustrate, the goals of both laws.

== Significance ==
=== Backpay and other workplace protections ===
The backpay at issue in Hoffman concerned wages lost after firing, not wages for work already completed. In guidance revised in July 2008, the U.S. Department of Labor explained that Hoffman did not prevent it from enforcing wage protections under the Fair Labor Standards Act and the Migrant and Seasonal Agricultural Worker Protection Act. The Department said it would continue enforcing those laws for documented and undocumented workers alike.

The NLRB also states that employees covered by the NLRA have rights regardless of immigration status. In Castro's case, the finding that his firing was unlawful remained in place, but he lost the $66,951 backpay award.

=== Employer incentives and later application ===
In Mezonos Maven Bakery, Inc. (2011), the NLRB applied Hoffman to seven workers whose employer had not asked for documents showing permission to work. The workers had been fired after complaining together about a supervisor. The case proceeded on the assumption that they lacked work authorization. The Board ruled that backpay was unavailable even when the employer, rather than the workers, had violated immigration-law requirements.

Chairman Wilma Liebman and Member Mark Gaston Pearce agreed that Hoffman required that result, but argued that denying backpay weakened labor-law enforcement and discouraged workers from challenging unlawful treatment. Member Brian Hayes declined to join their criticism and said that changing the law was Congress's responsibility.

In Palma v. NLRB (2013), a federal appeals court upheld the denial of backpay but sent the case back to the Board to consider whether the workers could receive conditional offers to return to their jobs. In 2015, the NLRB ordered the bakery to offer reinstatement if the workers provided the required employment documents within a reasonable time.

=== Race and immigration status ===
Legal scholar Shefali Milczarek-Desai discusses Hoffman as an example of the conflict between immigration enforcement and workplace protections. She argues that restricting financial remedies leaves immigrant workers less able to enforce their rights and can reduce the cost of unlawful conduct for employers. Her analysis connects those restrictions with the broader vulnerability of low-wage immigrant workers.

Leticia Saucedo examines that vulnerability through the "brown collar workplace," where newly arrived Latino immigrants are concentrated in particular jobs. Her definition includes workers with and without legal immigration status. She argues that employers may prefer workers they believe will be less likely to challenge poor conditions, and identifies language barriers and fear of job loss or deportation as sources of vulnerability. Saucedo also argues that Hoffman weakened undocumented workers' organizing efforts by limiting remedies for labor-law violations.

Shannon Gleeson's research provides further context for these barriers to reporting workplace violations. Her study of 41 documented and undocumented Latino restaurant workers in San Jose and Houston found that fear of deportation helped explain undocumented interviewees' reluctance to bring formal workplace claims.
