= Georgetown Journal on Poverty Law and Policy =

- Discipline: Poverty Law
- Language: English

Publication details
- Former name: Georgetown Journal on Fighting Poverty
- History: 1993–present
- Publisher: Georgetown University Law Center
- Frequency: Triannual

Standard abbreviations
- Bluebook: Geo. J. on Poverty L. & Pol'y
- ISO 4: Georget. J. Poverty Law Policy

Indexing
- ISSN: 1524-3974
- OCLC no.: 41031016

Links
- Journal homepage

The Georgetown Journal on Poverty Law and Policy is a student-edited law review published at Georgetown University Law Center in the United States.

The Georgetown Journal on Poverty Law and Policy is focused on poverty law issues. As part of its mission to help bring an end to poverty in the United States, the Journal publishes articles from distinguished law professors and practitioners in poverty-related fields. In addition, the Journal features student research, works from scholars in poverty-related disciplines, and the voices of persons living in poverty.

The Georgetown Journal on Poverty Law and Policy is published three issues each year. Each issue is focused upon a particular aspect of poverty law and policy. Recent "themes" have included rural poverty, urban poverty, former prisoner re-entry, and the impact of natural disasters such as Hurricane Katrina.

The Journal was founded by law students Leonard Adler and Shana Desouza Druffner and published its first issue in 1993 as the Georgetown Journal on Fighting Poverty. Volume 25, consisting of 45 editors and members, is currently in publication.

Among the journal's board of advisors is Peter Edelman, former HHS Assistant Secretary of Planning and Evaluation under President Bill Clinton.
