= San Diego Building Trades Council v. Garmon =

- Supreme Court of the United States

Argued January 20, 1959 Decided April 20, 1959
- Full case name: San Diego Building Trades Council v. Garmon, et al.
- Citations: 359 U.S. 236 (more) 79 S. Ct. 773; 3 L. Ed. 2d 775

Court membership
- Chief Justice Earl Warren Associate Justices Hugo Black · Felix Frankfurter; William O. Douglas · Tom C. Clark; John M. Harlan II · William J. Brennan Jr. Charles E. Whittaker · Potter Stewart

Case opinions
- Majority: Frankfurter
- Concurrence: Harlan, joined by Clark, Whittaker, Stewart

San Diego Building Trades Council v. Garmon, 359 U.S. 236 (1959), is a United States labor law case, concerning the scope of federal preemption against state law for labor rights.

== Background ==
Garmon had a business selling lumber in California. The San Diego Building Trades Council was a labor union that wanted Garmon only to hire workers who were union members, or applied to join the union within 30 days of beginning a job. Garmon refused, the union sent peaceful pickets to persuade customers and suppliers to stop dealing with Garmon. Garmon claimed that state law applied to grant damages against the Building Trades Council for picketing his business, and federal law did not apply.

The Superior Court for the County of San Diego found that the union had acted unlawfully under state law, and enjoined the union from picketing until they had won an election and become a collective bargaining agent, awarding $1000 in damages. The National Labor Relations Board (NLRB) declined jurisdiction for a representation hearing, "presumably because the amount of interstate commerce involved did not meet the Board's monetary standards in taking jurisdiction." The California Supreme Court held, because the NLRB declined jurisdiction, California courts had power over the dispute and the union committed an unfair labor practice under § 8(b)(2) of the National Labor Relations Act of 1935. The US Supreme Court then decided in Guss v. Utah Labor Relations Board, that the refusal of the National Labor Relations Board to assert jurisdiction did not mean the states had power, and vacated the judgment of the California court. The California court set aside the injunction, but still granted an award of damages. It said this was based on tort for unfair labor practices under the Civil Code. The case was granted certiorari again to decide if the California court had jurisdiction to award damages arising out of peaceful union activity which it could not enjoin.

== Judgment ==
The US Supreme Court held that the California Supreme Court was not entitled to award remedies against a union for picketing, because if "an activity is arguably subject to §7 or §8 of the Act, the States as well as the federal courts must defer to the exclusive competence of the National Labor Relations Board". This was true, even though the board had not given any ruling on the dispute "because the amount of interstate commerce involved did not meet the Board's monetary standards in taking jurisdiction..."

Felix Frankfurter gave the court's judgment.

The comprehensive regulation of industrial relations by Congress, novel federal legislation twenty-five years ago but now an integral part of our economic life, inevitably gave rise to difficult problems of federal-state relations.

[...]

What we said in Weber v. Anheuser-Busch, Inc., 348 U.S. 468, 75 S.Ct. 480, 99 L.Ed. 546, deserves repetition, because the considerations there outlined guide this day's decision:

'By the Taft-Hartley Act, Congress did not exhaust the full sweep of legislative power over industrial relations given by the Commerce Clause. Congress formulated a code whereby it outlawed some aspects of labor activities and left others free for the operation of economic forces. As to both categories, the areas that have been pre-empted by federal authority and thereby withdrawn from state power are not susceptible of delimitation by fixed metes and bounds. Obvious conflict, actual or potential, leads to easy judicial exclusion of state action. Such was the situation in Garner v. Teamsters Union, supra (346 U.S. 485, 74 S.Ct. 161, 98 L.Ed. 228). But as the opinion in that case recalled, the Labor Management Relations Act 'leaves much to the states, though Congress has refrained from telling us how much.' 346 U.S. at page 488, 74 S.Ct. at page 164. This penumbral area can be rendered progressively clear only by the course of litigation.' 348 U.S. at pages 480—481, 75 S.Ct. at page 488.

The case before us concerns one of the most teasing and frequently litigated areas of industrial relations, the multitude of activities regulated by §§ 7 and 8 of the National Labor Relations Act. 61 Stat. 140, 29 U.S.C. §§ 157, 158, 29 U.S.C.A §§ 157, 158. These broad provisions govern both protected 'concerted activities' and unfair labor practices. They regulate the vital, economic instruments of the strike and the picket line, and impinge on the clash of the still unsettled claims between employers and labor unions. The extent to which the variegated laws of the several States are displaced by a single, uniform, national rule has been a matter of frequent and recurring concern.

[...]

When it is clear or may fairly be assumed that the activities which a State purports to regulate are protected by § 7 of the National Labor Relations Act, or constitute an unfair labor practice under § 8, due regard for the federal enactment requires that state jurisdiction must yield. To leave the States free to regulate conduct so plainly within the central aim of federal regulation involves too great a danger of conflict between power asserted by Congress and requirements imposed by state law. Nor has it mattered whether the States have acted through laws of broad general application rather than laws specifically directed towards the governance of industrial relations.3 Regardless of the mode adopted, to allow the States to control conduct which is the subject of national regulation would create potential frustration of national purposes.

At times it has not been clear whether the particular activity regulated by the States was governed by § 7 or § 8 or was, perhaps, outside both these sections. But courts are not primary tribunals to adjudicate such issues. It is essential to the administration of the Act that these determinations be left in the first instance to the National Labor Relations Board. What is outside the scope of this Court's authority cannot remain within a State's power and state jurisdiction too must yield to the exclusive primary competence of the Board.

[...]

The case before us is such a case. The adjudication in California has throughout been based on the assumption that the behavior of the petitioning unions constituted an unfair labor practice. This conclusion was derived by the California courts from the facts as well as from their view of the Act. It is not for us to decide whether the National Labor Relations Board would have, or should have, decided these questions in the same manner. When an activity is arguably subject to § 7 or § 8 of the Act, the States as well as the federal courts must defer to the exclusive competence of the National Labor Relations Board if the danger of state interference with national policy is to be averted.

To require the States to yield to the primary jurisdiction of the National Board does not ensure Board adjudication of the status of a disputed activity. If the Board decides, subject to appropriate federal judicial review, that conduct is protected by § 7, or prohibited by § 8, then the matter is at an end, and the States are ousted of all jurisdiction. Or, the Board may decide that an activity is neither protected nor prohibited, and thereby raise the question whether such activity may be regulated by the States.4 However, the Board may also fail to determine the status of the disputed conduct by declining to assert jurisdiction, or by refusal of the General Counsel to file a charge, or by adopting some other disposition which does not define the nature of the activity with unclouded legal significance. This was the basic problem underlying our decision in Guss v. Utah Labor Relations Board, 353 U.S. 1, 77 S.Ct. 598, 609, 1 L.Ed.2d 601. In that case we held that the failure of the National Labor Relations Board to assume jurisdiction did not leave the States free to regulate activities they would otherwise be precluded from regulating. It follows that the failure of the Board to define the legal significance under the Act of a particular activity does not give the States the power to act. In the absence of the Board's clear determination that an activity is neither protected nor prohibited or of compelling precedent applied to essentially undisputed facts, it is not for this Court to decide whether such activities are subject to state jurisdiction. The withdrawal of this narrow area from possible state activity follows from our decisions in Weber and Guss. The governing consideration is that to allow the States to control activities that are potentially subject to federal regulation involves too great a danger of conflict with national labor policy.

In the light of these principles the case before us is clear. Since the National Labor Relations Board has not adjudicated the status of the conduct for which the State of California seeks to give a remedy in damages, and since such activity is arguably within the compass of § 7 or § 8 of the Act, the State's jurisdiction is displaced....

== See also ==
- United States labor law
