= February 1939 =

Month of 1939

<<	February 1939					>>
Su	Mo	Tu	We	Th	Fr	Sa
			1	2	3	4
5	6	7	8	9	10	11
12	13	14	15	16	17	18
19	20	21	22	23	24	25
26	27	28

The following events occurred in February 1939:

== February 1, 1939 (Wednesday) ==
- The Nationalists pushed into the province of Girona while taking the Catalan cities of Tordera and Vic.
- The Soviet Union closed its embassy in Budapest due to Hungary's agreement to join the Anti-Comintern Pact.
- Born: Paul Gillmor, politician, in Tiffin, Ohio (d. 2007); Ekaterina Maximova, ballerina, in Moscow, USSR (d. 2009); Joe Sample, jazz pianist, in Houston, Texas (d. 2014)

== February 2, 1939 (Thursday) ==
- The Republicans formally asked Britain and France to help negotiate a ceasefire.
- Generalissimo Francisco Franco's foreign minister Francisco Gómez-Jordana Sousa promised that they would pardon Republican soldiers who surrendered.
- Japanese submarine I-63 sank in Bungo Channel after a collision with another submarine during maneuvers. Six of the crew were standing on the bridge at the time of the collision and were able to swim to safety; the other 81 perished.
- Died: Amanda McKittrick Ros, 78, Irish writer

== February 3, 1939 (Friday) ==
- The Nationalists reached Tossa de Mar.
- The musical film Honolulu starring Eleanor Powell and Robert Young was released.
- The Baltimore Museum of Art opened, "Contemporary Negro Art," one of the first major museum exhibitions in the United States to feature Black artists.
- The Collins Block fire in Syracuse, New York, killed eight firefighters, the greatest loss of life in the Syracuse Fire Department's history. The eight firemen fell into the cellar of the building and were trapped under rubble. Fellow firefighters worked for six hours to rescue them until a further collapse eliminated all possibility of their survival.

== February 4, 1939 (Saturday) ==
- The Battle of Valsequillo ended in Republican failure.
- Spanish President Manuel Azaña crossed the border to France and went into exile.
- Irish Republican Army bombs exploded at two London Underground stations, Tottenham Court Road and Leicester Square, injuring seven, two seriously.
- Died: Henri Deterding, 72, Dutch oil tycoon

== February 5, 1939 (Sunday) ==
- During the Catalonia Offensive, the Spanish Nationalists (Francoists) took Girona.
- Four fires broke out in Coventry, believed to have been started by the Irish Republican Army.
- A German expedition to the Antarctic completed its work. The Germans gave the explored area of approximately 600,000 km the name of New Swabia.

== February 6, 1939 (Monday) ==
- Neville Chamberlain was heartily applauded in the House of Commons when he said that any threat to France "must evoke the immediate co-operation of this country."
- Arabs in Jerusalem called for a three-day strike coinciding with a conference in London between Arabs, Jews and British authorities on the Holy Land.
- Syracuse, New York, Fire Department First Assistant Chief Charles A. Boynton died of a heart attack. Boynton had been present at the Collins Block fire on February 3 and had worked for hours attempting to rescue the trapped firefighters and then to recover their bodies.
- Born: Mike Farrell, actor, in Saint Paul, Minnesota

== February 7, 1939 (Tuesday) ==
- The Battle of Minorca began.
- Spanish Prime Minister Juan Negrín and General Vicente Rojo Lluch crossed the border into France.
- The London Conference on Palestine opened.

== February 8, 1939 (Wednesday) ==
- The Nationalists captured Figueres.

== February 9, 1939 (Thursday) ==
- The Battle of Minorca ended with the surrender of the Republican garrison.
- The Home Office announced plans to provide shelters to thousands of British homes in districts most likely to be bombed in the event of war. The steel shelters, nicknamed "Anderson shelters" after Lord Privy Seal Sir John Anderson, measured 6'6" by 4'6" and were designed so that two unskilled people could erect them.
- Hainan Island Operation started with the invasion of Japanese troops to Hainan northern coast.
- Born: Tadahiro Matsushita, politician, in Satsumasendai, Kagoshima, Japan (d. 2012)

== February 10, 1939 (Friday) ==
- The Catalonia Offensive ended in Nationalist victory.
- Hainan Island Operation: Japanese forces occupied the island of Hainan.
- The film The Adventures of Huckleberry Finn starring Mickey Rooney was released.
- The Three Bears (Terry Toons) was released.
- Future hall of Fame boxers Eddie Booker and Fritzie Zivic faced off in Madison Square Garden. Zivic victorious.
- Pius XI died at 5:31 a.m. (Rome Time) of a third heart attack at the age of 81. His last words to those near him at the time of his death were spoken with clarity and firmness: "My soul parts from you all in peace."
- Born: Adrienne Clarkson, Canadian journalist, politician and 26th Governor General of Canada, in Hong Kong; Peter Purves, television presenter, in Preston, England
- Died: Pope Pius XI, 81, Pope of the Catholic Church

== February 11, 1939 (Saturday) ==
- Benjamin S. Kelsey flew an experimental Lockheed P-38 Lightning from March Field in California to Mitchel Field in New York. The plane crashed short of the runway due to engine failure from carburetor ice, but Kelsey was not injured.
- Died: Franz Schmidt, 64, Austrian composer, cellist and pianist

== February 12, 1939 (Sunday) ==
- The first of nine funeral masses in as many days was held for Pius XI. 200,000 Catholics began streaming into Vatican City to take part.
- The South American Championship of football was won by host country Peru, defeating Uruguay 2-1 in the deciding match.
- Megan Taylor of the United Kingdom won the women's competition of the World Figure Skating Championships in Prague.
- Canada won gold at the World Ice Hockey Championships in Switzerland.
- Born: Yael Dayan, politician and author, in Nahalal, Mandatory Palestine (d. 2024); Ray Manzarek, keyboardist of The Doors, in Chicago (d. 2013)
- Died: S. P. L. Sørensen, 71, Danish chemist

== February 13, 1939 (Monday) ==
- Generalissimo Francisco Franco promulgated a decree providing for dissolution of all parties associated with the Popular Front and penalties of loss of citizenship and exile for those deemed hostile to the Nationalist cause.
- Born: Beate Klarsfeld, Nazi hunter, in Bucharest, Romania

== February 14, 1939 (Tuesday) ==
- Pope Pius XI was laid to rest in St. Peter's Basilica.
- The German battleship Bismarck was launched.

== February 15, 1939 (Wednesday) ==
- Hungarian Prime Minister Béla Imrédy resigned after confirming rumors that his ancestry was partly Jewish. Imrédy still defended his antisemitic policies as "a good thing for our fatherland" but said he was resigning because it was "inconsistent that under such circumstances I should be identified with such legislation."
- The Lillian Hellman play The Little Foxes starring Tallulah Bankhead premiered at the National Theatre on Broadway.
- The John Ford-directed Western film Stagecoach, starring Claire Trevor and John Wayne in his breakthrough role, was premiered in New York City and Los Angeles.

== February 16, 1939 (Thursday) ==
- Pál Teleki became Prime Minister of Hungary.
- Born: Adolfo Azcuna, Associate Justice of the Supreme Court of the Philippines, in Katipunan, Zamboanga del Norte
- Died: Josef Moroder-Lusenberg, 92, Austro-Italian artist

== February 17, 1939 (Friday) ==
- Adolf Hitler opened the annual Berlin Auto Show. On display was the Volkswagen, scheduled to be available to the general public in 1941 at a price of 990 marks.

== February 18, 1939 (Saturday) ==
- The Golden Gate International Exposition opened on Treasure Island, San Francisco in California.
- Died: Kanoko Okamoto, 49, Japanese writer and poet

== February 19, 1939 (Sunday) ==
- Peruvian army officers launched an uprising against the government while President Óscar R. Benavides was sailing on holiday. The coup in the presidential palace was quickly put down with about a dozen deaths, including the coup's leader General Antonio Rodríguez.
- Graham Sharp of the United Kingdom won the men's competition of the World Figure Skating Championships in Budapest.
- Born: Max Bennett, neuroscientist, in Melbourne, Australia; Erin Pizzey, author and founder of the world's first domestic violence shelter, in Qingdao, China.

== February 20, 1939 (Monday) ==
- 20,000 people attended a rally of the German American Bund in New York's Madison Square Garden. More than 50,000 anti-Nazis protested outside the venue, held back by 1,700 police who made thirteen arrests breaking up various fights in the street.
- The Italian Fascist Party excluded Jews from membership.
- Edsel-Ford debuted the 1939 model of their Lincoln-Zephyr design, the Lincoln Continental.

== February 21, 1939 (Tuesday) ==
- Nazi Germany decreed that all Jews were to turn in their gold, silver and other valuables to the state without compensation.
- 100,000 Nationalist soldiers paraded in Barcelona.
- The battleship HMS King George V was launched.

== February 22, 1939 (Wednesday) ==
- The British Cabinet made the unprecedented decision to authorize military aircraft production to maximum levels without regard to cost.
- Died: Antonio Machado, 63, Spanish poet; Alexander Yegorov, 55, Soviet military leader (died in prison)

== February 23, 1939 (Thursday) ==
- The 11th Academy Awards were held in Los Angeles. You Can't Take It with You won Best Picture.
- The first pay-per-view sporting event in history took place when a live BBC Television broadcast of a boxing match between Eric Boon and Arthur Danahar was shown at three London cinemas. In 1939 only about 20,000 London households had television sets in a city of 8.6 million people, and the crowds at the cinemas were completely packed.
- Reich Transport Minister Julius Dorpmüller decreed that Jews were forbidden from using sleeping and dining cars on German railroads.
- Lou Thesz defeated Everett Marshall in St. Louis to retake the National Wrestling Association World Heavyweight Championship.
- Born: Keith Fowler, actor, stage director and educator, in San Francisco (d. 2023)

== February 24, 1939 (Friday) ==
- Hungary joined the Anti-Comintern Pact.
- Born: Doric Wilson, playwright and theater critic, in Los Angeles (d. 2011)

== February 25, 1939 (Saturday) ==
- Berlin police ordered the city's Jewish community to produce the names of 100 Jews per day, who would then be given notice to leave Germany within two weeks. It was not explained what would happen to those who did not comply.

== February 26, 1939 (Sunday) ==
- About 1,000 demonstrators marched from Trafalgar Square to Downing Street protesting the British government's impending recognition of Francoist Spain.
- Eleanor Roosevelt, the First Lady of the United States, resigned from the Daughters of the American Revolution to protest their refusal to allow African American contralto Marian Anderson to perform at DAR Constitution Hall in Washington, D.C.
- Born: Chuck Wepner, boxer, in New York City
- Died: Levon Mirzoyan, 51, Azerbaijani Armenian communist official (executed in the Great Purge)

== February 27, 1939 (Monday) ==
- Manuel Azaña resigned as President of the Spanish Republic. Diego Martínez Barrio was his constitutionally designated successor but he refused the post.
- Britain and France formally recognized Francoist Spain.
- 31 Arabs died in clashes with Jews in Palestine.
- The U.S. Supreme Court decided NLRB v. Sands Manufacturing Co., NLRB v. Columbian Enameling & Stamping Co., NLRB v. Fansteel Metallurgical Corp. and Taylor v. Standard Gas & Electric Co.
- Died: Nadezhda Krupskaya, 70, Russian revolutionary and wife of Vladimir Lenin

== February 28, 1939 (Tuesday) ==
- The Cortes Generales convened in exile in Paris and accepted Azaña's resignation.
- A motion was brought against the Neville Chamberlain government in the House of Commons declaring the recognition of Francoist Spain "a deliberate affront to the legitimate Government of a friendly Power, is a gross breach of international traditions, and marks a further stage in a policy which is steadily destroying in all democratic countries confidence in the good faith of Great Britain." The motion was defeated, 344 to 137.
- Two competing editions of Hitler's Mein Kampf appeared in U.S. bookstores on the same day. Reynal & Hitchcock's version was officially leased from the American copyright holder Houghton Mifflin, but Stackpole Sons' edition was unauthorized and proudly advertised that Hitler would receive no royalties from its sales. Stackpole claimed that Hitler had not been a citizen of any country at the time of publication and so the book was therefore public domain. Reynal & Hitchcock responded by promising to donate all profits from its edition to a refugee fund, and Houghton Mifflin continued to fight Stackpole Sons in court.
- Born: Daniel C. Tsui, Chinese-born American physicist, in Fan, Henan; Tommy Tune, dancer, singer, choreographer and actor, in Wichita Falls, Texas
