= Sun Oil Co. v. Wortman =

- Supreme Court of the United States

Argued March 22, 1988 Decided June 15, 1988
- Full case name: Sun Oil Company v. Wortman
- Citations: 486 U.S. 717 (more) 108 S. Ct. 2117; 100 L. Ed. 2d 743

Holding
- The Constitution does not bar application of the forum State's statute of limitations to claims governed by the substantive law of a different State.

Court membership
- Chief Justice William Rehnquist Associate Justices William J. Brennan Jr. · Byron White; Thurgood Marshall · Harry Blackmun; John P. Stevens · Sandra Day O'Connor; Antonin Scalia · Anthony Kennedy

Case opinions
- Majority: Scalia, joined by unanimous (Part I); Rehnquist, White, Stevens, O'Connor (Part II); Brennan, White, Marshall, Blackmun, Stevens (Part III)
- Concurrence: Brennan, joined by Marshall, Blackmun
- Concur/dissent: O'Connor, joined by Rehnquist
- Kennedy took no part in the consideration or decision of the case.

Sun Oil Co. v. Wortman, 486 U.S. 717 (1988), was a conflict of laws case decided by the United States Supreme Court.

== Facts ==
The facts were similar to the case of Phillips Petroleum Co. v. Shutts, also being a class action lawsuit in Kansas for overdue interest payments, with plaintiffs from all fifty U.S. states. Here, as opposed to applying its 'whole law,' Kansas applies its 5-year statute of limitations instead of the shorter Statutes of Limitations of Louisiana, Texas, or Oklahoma.

== Issue ==
Does the use of Kansas law by the courts of the state of Kansas for all plaintiffs violate Fourteenth Amendment Due Process, or the Full Faith and Credit Clause?

== Rule ==
The majority opinion, by Justice Scalia, held that there can never be a violation of Fourteenth Amendment Due Process or Full Faith and Credit if a state interprets as procedural something that has been deemed procedural by states in general for hundreds of years. The rule in question being traditional, this was, therefore, a permissible practice.

A concurring opinion by Justice Brennan, joined by Justices Marshall and Blackmun, asserted that the Court laid down too broad a rule, and that assertions that something is procedural or substantive should be examined on a case-by-case basis. Where the law is partly procedural and partly substantive, the concurrence argued, the Court must weigh how much of each is implicated. In this case, there was no problem because Kansas is not limiting substantive rights granted by other states by allowing plaintiffs to bring these claims for a longer time, the presumption being that other states enact limitations designed to unburden their own courts.

A dissent by Justice O'Connor, joined by Chief Justice Rehnquist, asserted that the Kansas Supreme Court violated the Full Faith and Credit Clause by ignoring statutory interest rates imposed by three other states.

Justice Kennedy took no part in the case.
