= Clay v. Sun Insurance Office, Ltd. =

John Clay v. Sun Insurance Office, Ltd.
- Supreme Court of the United States

Argued March 22–23, 1960 Decided June 13, 1960
- Full case name: Clay v. Sun Insurance Office, Ltd.
- Citations: 363 U.S. 207 (more)

Court membership
- Chief Justice Earl Warren Associate Justices Hugo Black · Felix Frankfurter; William O. Douglas · Tom C. Clark; John M. Harlan II · William J. Brennan Jr. Charles E. Whittaker · Potter Stewart

Case opinions
- Majority: Frankfurter
- Dissent: Black, Douglas

John Clay v. Sun Insurance Office, Ltd.
- Supreme Court of the United States

Argued April 28, 1964 Decided May 18, 1964
- Full case name: Clay v. Sun Insurance Office, Ltd.
- Citations: 377 U.S. 179 (more)

Court membership
- Chief Justice Earl Warren Associate Justices Hugo Black · William O. Douglas; Tom C. Clark · John M. Harlan II; William J. Brennan Jr. · Potter Stewart; Byron White · Arthur Goldberg

Case opinions
- Majority: Douglas
- Dissent: none

Clay v. Sun Insurance Office, Ltd., 363 U.S. 207 (1960) and 377 U.S. 179 (1964), was a conflict of laws case that was twice heard by the Supreme Court of the United States, with an initial decision remanding the case for further proceedings in 1960, and a final resolution in 1964.

== Facts ==
Plaintiff, while living in Illinois, bought an insurance policy from a company headquartered in the United Kingdom. The policy included a clause requiring that insured's seeking to sue on an insurance claim must do so within twelve months. The plaintiff later moved to Florida, which has five year statute of limitations for lawsuits brought on contracts. The plaintiff suffered a loss in Florida, and sued in Florida to recover under the policy. The District Court applied Florida law and allowed recovery.

The United States Court of Appeals for the Fifth Circuit reversed, citing Home Insurance Co. v. Dick.

== 1960 Supreme Court decision ==
The case was appealed to the United States Supreme Court, which first considered it in 1960, noting that the circuit court of appeals could not "make a competent guess" about how the Florida courts would construe an insurance statute. The court observed that the Florida legislature had passed a statute allowing the federal courts to certify questions of state law to the Florida Supreme Court, but that the Florida courts had not yet made a rule establishing procedures under the statute. After this decision, various states began to adopt statutes or rules allowing for the certification of questions of state law to state courts. The Supreme Court remanded Clay to the Fifth Circuit for reconsideration in an opinion drawing dissents from Justices Black and Douglass. After further litigation before the Court of Appeals, the case was again appealed to the Supreme Court in 1964, this time obtaining a final resolution.

== 1964 Supreme Court decision ==
On appeal in 1964, the Supreme Court considered whether the contacts between the defendant insurance company and the forum state of Florida were sufficient to avoid a violation of Fourteenth Amendment due process or of the Full Faith and Credit Clause. Justice Douglas, writing for the unanimous court, found that Home Insurance Co. v. Dick was distinguishable based on the absence of contacts between the claimant in that case and the state in which the lawsuit was brought. However, because insurance contracts are transitory, insurers must expect policy holders to move to other states, and for the policies to be subject to the laws of those states. The insurer in Clay's case did business throughout the United States, and had no particular affinity for the laws of Illinois, while Clay had ample contacts with Florida sufficient to satisfy Fourteenth Amendment due process or Full Faith and Credit.
