= Allstate Insurance Co. v. Hague =

Allstate Ins. Co. v. Hague
- Supreme Court of the United States

Argued October 6, 1980 Decided January 13, 1981
- Full case name: Allstate Insurance Company v. Lavinia Hague
- Docket no.: 79-938
- Citations: 449 U.S. 302 (more)
- Argument: Oral argument

Court membership
- Chief Justice Warren E. Burger Associate Justices William J. Brennan Jr. · Potter Stewart; Byron White · Thurgood Marshall; Harry Blackmun · Lewis F. Powell Jr. William Rehnquist · John P. Stevens

Case opinions
- Plurality: Brennan, joined by White, Marshall, Blackmun
- Concurrence: Stevens
- Dissent: Powell, joined by Burger, Rehnquist
- Stewart took no part in the consideration or decision of the case.

Laws applied
- U.S. Const. art. IV, § 1; U.S. Const. amend. XIV

Allstate Insurance Co. v. Hague, 449 U.S. 302 (1981), was a conflict of laws case decided by the United States Supreme Court.

== Background ==
The testator, Ralph Hague, was a Wisconsin resident who worked in Minnesota. While riding his motorcycle in Wisconsin near the Minnesota border, he was hit and killed by a car driven by another Wisconsin resident. Hague's wife moved to Minnesota and was appointed administrator of his estate there. Hague had three insurance policies worth $15,000 each. The Allstate Insurance Company refused to pay on more than one of these, and Hague's wife filed a lawsuit in Minnesota against the insurance company.

Under Wisconsin law, a testator who held multiple insurance policies could only collect on one of them, but under Minnesota law, a testator could 'stack' the policies, and collect the full $45,000. Applying Minnesota's better-law approach to choice of law, the Minnesota trial court chose to apply Minnesota law based on public policy. The Minnesota Supreme Court agreed and also concluded that this was the better law. The defendant, Allstate, appealed to the United States Supreme Court.

== Decision ==
The Court was confronted with the question of whether the application of Minnesota law was a violation of either the Due Process Clause of the Fourteenth Amendment or the Full Faith and Credit Clause of Article Four of the United States Constitution.

A plurality opinion by Justice Brennan, joined by three other justices, held that both the Fourteenth Amendment and the Full Faith and Credit Clause are satisfied so long as there are sufficient aggregate contacts with the state whose law is applied. The plurality opinion found three important contacts:

1. The testator worked in Minnesota (he commuted into Minnesota and had certain rights guaranteed there, and his Minnesota employer lost his services);
2. Defendant did business in Minnesota, was familiar with Minnesota laws, and knew it could be sued there;
3. The testator's wife moved to Minnesota and was named administrator there, with nothing suggesting the move was forum shopping.

In a concurring opinion, Justice Stevens said there was no Full Faith and Credit violation unless the application of forum law threatened national unity, and no Fourteenth Amendment due process violation unless the application of the chosen law was totally arbitrary or fundamentally unfair.

Stevens proposed that the mere interpretation of a contract by one law or another would not threaten unity, alleviating any Full Faith and Credit Clause problem. The defendant did business in Minnesota and knew that stacking was the majority rule, and there was no contract provision addressing stacking or forum coverage. Therefore, there was no Fourteenth Amendment due process problem. The testator's employment and post-accident move were completely irrelevant to the outcome.

Stevens further proposed that the application of the law of the forum state can never be totally arbitrary because the court's familiarity with its own law will make such a choice presumptively valid. He opined that Minnesota courts were wrong on application of choice of law, but that it was not the function of the United States Supreme Court to deal with that.

Justice Powell dissented. Powell proposed that the forum state court's decision to apply its own law was valid unless there were no significant contacts. He identified two policies driving the Court's precedents:

1. Contacts cannot be so slight and casual as to make application of forum law fundamentally unfair, with the touchstone being the reasonable expectations of the parties;
2. Forum states must have a legitimate interest in the outcome of the litigation (even if citing public policy) – that is, litigation must deal with things that affect persons in the state or happen in the state.

Powell did not disagree with Stevens's first prong because the defendant did business in Minnesota, and could be sued anywhere. However, he did not think application of Minnesota law furthered a legitimate state interest. Powell also agreed that the post-accident move was irrelevant and that giving it weight would encourage forum shopping. It was also irrelevant that the insurer did business there, as it did business everywhere. The testator's employment in Minnesota was irrelevant to the facts of this case, where neither the policy, nor the accident, nor the stacking question had anything to do with the testator's work.

Justice Potter Stewart did not participate in the case, resulting in a 4-1-3 split.

== Significance ==
The opinion enunciated the test for whether there is a "significant aggregation of contacts" sufficient that "applying local law would not be fundamentally unfair", and "demonstrated how minimal this requirement is in practice".
