= List of United States Supreme Court cases, volume 306 =

Supreme Court of the United States
- Interactive map of Supreme Court of the United States
- 38°53′26″N 77°00′16″W
- Established: March 4, 1789; 236 years ago
- Location: Washington, D.C.
- Coordinates: 38°53′26″N 77°00′16″W
- Composition method: Presidential nomination with Senate confirmation
- Authorised by: Constitution of the United States, Art. III, § 1
- Judge term length: life tenure, subject to impeachment and removal
- Number of positions: 9 (by statute)
- Website: supremecourt.gov

This is a list of cases reported in volume 306 of United States Reports, decided by the Supreme Court of the United States in 1939.

== Justices of the Supreme Court at the time of volume 306 U.S. ==
The Supreme Court is established by Article III, Section 1 of the Constitution of the United States, which says: "The judicial Power of the United States, shall be vested in one supreme Court . . .". The size of the Court is not specified; the Constitution leaves it to Congress to set the number of justices. Under the Judiciary Act of 1789 Congress originally fixed the number of justices at six (one chief justice and five associate justices). Since 1789 Congress has varied the size of the Court from six to seven, nine, ten, and back to nine justices (always including one chief justice).

When the cases in volume 306 were decided the Court comprised the following members (Justice Brandeis retired in the midst of the cases reported in volume 306):

Portrait	Justice	Office	Home State	Succeeded	Date confirmed by the Senate (Vote)	Tenure on Supreme Court
	Charles Evans Hughes	Chief Justice	New York	William Howard Taft	February 13, 1930 (52–26)	February 24, 1930 – June 30, 1941 (Retired)
	James Clark McReynolds	Associate Justice	Tennessee	Horace Harmon Lurton	August 29, 1914 (44–6)	October 12, 1914 – January 31, 1941 (Retired)
	Louis Brandeis	Associate Justice	Massachusetts	Joseph Rucker Lamar	June 1, 1916 (47–22)	June 5, 1916 – February 13, 1939 (Retired)
	Pierce Butler	Associate Justice	Minnesota	William R. Day	December 21, 1922 (61–8)	January 2, 1923 – November 16, 1939 (Died)
	Harlan F. Stone	Associate Justice	New York	Joseph McKenna	February 5, 1925 (71–6)	March 2, 1925 – July 2, 1941 (Continued as chief justice)
	Owen Roberts	Associate Justice	Pennsylvania	Edward Terry Sanford	May 20, 1930 (Acclamation)	June 2, 1930 – July 31, 1945 (Resigned)
	Hugo Black	Associate Justice	Alabama	Willis Van Devanter	August 17, 1937 (63–16)	August 19, 1937 – September 17, 1971 (Retired)
	Stanley Forman Reed	Associate Justice	Kentucky	George Sutherland	January 25, 1938 (Acclamation)	January 31, 1938 – February 25, 1957 (Retired)
	Felix Frankfurter	Associate Justice	Massachusetts	Benjamin Nathan Cardozo	January 17, 1939 (Acclamation)	January 30, 1939 – August 28, 1962 (Retired)

== Federal court system ==
Under the Judiciary Act of 1789 the federal court structure at the time comprised District Courts, which had general trial jurisdiction; Circuit Courts, which had mixed trial and appellate (from the US District Courts) jurisdiction; and the United States Supreme Court, which had appellate jurisdiction over the federal District and Circuit courts—and for certain issues over state courts. The Supreme Court also had limited original jurisdiction (i.e., in which cases could be filed directly with the Supreme Court without first having been heard by a lower federal or state court). There were one or more federal District Courts and/or Circuit Courts in each state, territory, or other geographical region.

The Judiciary Act of 1891 created the United States Courts of Appeals and reassigned the jurisdiction of most routine appeals from the district and circuit courts to these appellate courts. The Act created nine new courts that were originally known as the "United States Circuit Courts of Appeals." The new courts had jurisdiction over most appeals of lower court decisions. The Supreme Court could review either legal issues that a court of appeals certified or decisions of court of appeals by writ of certiorari. On January 1, 1912, the effective date of the Judicial Code of 1911, the old Circuit Courts were abolished, with their remaining trial court jurisdiction transferred to the U.S. District Courts.

== List of cases in volume 306 U.S. ==
Case name	Citation	Opinion of the Court	Vote	Concurring opinion or statement	Dissenting opinion or statement	Procedural jurisdiction	Result
Currin v. Wallace, Secretary of Agriculture	306 U.S. 1 (1939)	Hughes	6-2[a]	none	McReynolds and Butler (without opinions)	certiorari to the United States Court of Appeals for the Fourth Circuit (4th Cir.)	affirmed
Bowen v. Johnston	306 U.S. 19 (1939)	Hughes	8-0[a]	none	none	certiorari to the United States Court of Appeals for the Ninth Circuit (9th Cir.)	affirmed
Washingtonian Publishing Company v. Pearson	306 U.S. 30 (1939)	McReynolds	5-3[a]	none	Black (opinion; with which Roberts and Reed concurred)	certiorari to the United States Court of Appeals for the District of Columbia (D.C. Cir.)	reversed
Utah Fuel Company v. National Bituminous Coal Commission	306 U.S. 56 (1939)	McReynolds	8-0[a]	Black (short statement)	none	certiorari to the United States Court of Appeals for the District of Columbia (D.C. Cir.)	District Court affirmed
Felt and Tarrant Manufacturing Company v. Gallagher	306 U.S. 62 (1939)	McRaynolds	7-0[a][b]	none	none	appeal from the United States District Court for the Southern District of California (S.D. Cal.)	affirmed
United States v. Durkee Famous Foods, Inc.	306 U.S. 68 (1939)	McReynolds	8-0[a]	none	none	appeal from the United States District Court for the District of New Jersey (D.N.J.)	affirmed
Dixie Ohio Express Company v. State Revenue Commission of Georgia	306 U.S. 72 (1939)	Butler	7-0[a][b]	Black (without opinion)	none	appeal from the Georgia Supreme Court (Ga.)	affirmed
H.P. Welch Company v. New Hampshire	306 U.S. 79 (1939)	Butler	8-0[a]	none	none	appeal from the New Hampshire Supreme Court (N.H.)	affirmed
Mackay Radio and Telephone Company v. Radio Corporation of America	306 U.S. 86 (1939)	Stone	7-0[a][b]	none	none	certiorari to the United States Court of Appeals for the Second Circuit (2d Cir.)	reversed
Wichita Royalty Company v. City National Bank of Wichita Falls	306 U.S. 103 (1939)	Stone	8-0[a]	none	none	certiorari to the United States Court of Appeals for the Fifth Circuit (5th Cir.)	affirmed
Helvering, Commissioner of Internal Revenue v. R.J. Reynolds Tobacco Company	306 U.S. 110 (1939)	Roberts	8-0[a]	none	none	certiorari to the United States Court of Appeals for the Fourth Circuit (4th Cir.)	affirmed
First Chrold Corporation v. Commissioner of Internal Revenue	306 U.S. 117 (1939)	Roberts	8-0[a]	none	none	certiorari to the United States Court of Appeals for the Third Circuit (3d Cir.)	reversed
Tennessee Electric Power Company v. Tennessee Valley Authority	306 U.S. 118 (1939)	Roberts	5-2[a][b]	none	Butler (opinion; joined by McReynolds)	appeal from the United States District Court for the Eastern District of Tennessee (E.D. Tenn.)	affirmed
Inland Steel Company v. United States	306 U.S. 153 (1939)	Black	8-0[a]	none	none	appeal from the United States District Court for the Northern District of Illinois (N.D. Ill.)	affirmed
United States v. Midstate Horticultural Company	306 U.S. 161 (1939)	Black	8-0[a]	none	none	appeal from the United States District Court for the Eastern District of Pennsylvania (E.D. Pa.)	affirmed
Southern Pacific Company v. Gallagher	306 U.S. 167 (1939)	Reed	5-2[a][b]	Black (without opinion)	Butler (short statement; joined by McReynolds)	appeal from the United States District Court for the Northern District of California (N.D. Cal.)	affirmed
Pacific Telephone and Telegraph Company v. Gallagher	306 U.S. 182 (1939)	Reed	5-2[a][b]	none	McReynolds and Butler (without opinions)	appeal from the United States District Court for the Northern District of California (N.D. Cal.)	affirmed
City of Texarkana v. Arkansas Louisiana Gas Company	306 U.S. 188 (1939)	Reed	6-2[a]	none	McReynolds and Butler (without opinions)	certiorari to the United States Court of Appeals for the Fifth Circuit (5th Cir.)	reversed
Public Service Commission of Missouri v. Brashear Freight Lines, Inc.	306 U.S. 204 (1939)	per curiam	9-0	none	none	appeal from the United States District Court for the Western District of Missouri (W.D. Mo.)	dismissed
Interstate Circuit, Inc. v. United States	306 U.S. 208 (1939)	Stone	5-3[a]	none	Roberts (opinion; joined by McReynolds and Butler)	appeal from the United States District Court for the Northern District of Texas (N.D. Tex.)	affirmed
National Labor Relations Board v. Fansteel Metallurgical Corporation	306 U.S. 240 (1939)	Hughes	5-2[a]	Stone (opinion, concurring in part)	Reed (opinion, dissenting in part; with which Black concurred)	certiorari to the United States Court of Appeals for the Seventh Circuit (7th Cir.)	affirmed as modified
Eichholz v. Public Service Commission of Missouri	306 U.S. 268 (1939)	Hughes	8-0	none	none	appeal from the United States District Court for the Western District of Missouri (W.D. Mo.)	affirmed
United States v. Bertelsen and Petersen Engineering Company	306 U.S. 276 (1939)	McReynolds	7-0[b]	none	none	certiorari to the United States Court of Appeals for the First Circuit (1st Cir.)	affirmed
Titus v. Wallick	306 U.S. 282 (1939)	Stone	8-0	none	none	certiorari to the Ohio Supreme Court (Ohio)	reversed
National Labor Relations Board v. Columbian Enameling & Stamping Co.	306 U.S. 292 (1939)	Stone	5-2[a]	none	Black (opinion; joined by Reed)	certiorari to the United States Court of Appeals for the Seventh Circuit (7th Cir.)	affirmed
Taylor v. Standard Gas and Electric Company	306 U.S. 307 (1939)	Roberts	7-0[a]	none	none	certiorari to the United States Court of Appeals for the Tenth Circuit (10th Cir.)	reversed
United States v. Towery	306 U.S. 324 (1939)	Roberts	8-0	none	none	certiorari to the United States Court of Appeals for the Seventh Circuit (7th Cir.)	reversed
National Labor Relations Board v. Sands Manufacturing Company	306 U.S. 332 (1939)	Roberts	5-2[a]	none	Black and Reed (without opinions)	certiorari to the United States Court of Appeals for the Sixth Circuit (6th Cir.)	affirmed
Milk Control Board v. Eisenberg Farm Products	306 U.S. 346 (1939)	Roberts	6-2	none	McReynolds and Butler (joint short statement)	certiorari to the Pennsylvania Supreme Court (Pa.)	reversed
Pierre v. Louisiana	306 U.S. 354 (1939)	Black	8-0	none	none	certiorari to the Louisiana Supreme Court (La.)	reversed
United States v. Jacobs	306 U.S. 363 (1939)	Black	4-3[c]	none	McReynolds, Butler, and Roberts (joint opinion)	certiorari to the United States Court of Appeals for the Seventh Circuit (7th Cir.)	reversed (one case); affirmed (one case)
Hale v. Bimco Trading, Inc.	306 U.S. 375 (1939)	Frankfurter	8-0	none	none	appeal from the United States District Court for the Northern District of Florida (N.D. Fla.)	affirmed
Keifer and Keifer v. Reconstruction Finance Corporation	306 U.S. 381 (1939)	Frankfurter	8-0	none	none	certiorari to the United States Court of Appeals for the Eighth Circuit (8th Cir.)	reversed
Texas v. Florida	306 U.S. 398 (1939)	Stone	6-2	none	Frankfurter (opinion; with which Black concurred)	original jurisdiction	report of special master confirmed
Fairbanks v. United States	306 U.S. 436 (1939)	McReynolds	8-0	none	none	certiorari to the United States Court of Appeals for the Ninth Circuit (9th Cir.)	affirmed
Clason v. Indiana	306 U.S. 439 (1939)	McReynolds	8-0	none	none	appeal from the Indiana Supreme Court (Ind.)	affirmed
Smith v. The Ferncliff	306 U.S. 444 (1939)	McReynolds	8-0	none	none	certified questions from the United States Court of Appeals for the Fourth Circuit (4th Cir.)	certified questions answered
Lanzetta v. New Jersey	306 U.S. 451 (1939)	Butler	7-0[a]	none	none	appeal from the New Jersey Court of Errors and Appeals (N.J.)	reversed
Chesebro v. Los Angeles County Flood Control District	306 U.S. 459 (1939)	Butler	8-0	none	none	appeal from the California Supreme Court (Cal.)	affirmed
Graves and Others, Commissioners Constituting the State Tax Commission of New York v. New York ex rel. O'Keefe	306 U.S. 466 (1939)	Stone	6-2	Hughes (without opinion); Frankfurter (opinion)	Butler and McReynolds (joint opinion)	certiorari to the New York Supreme Court (N.Y. Sup. Ct.)	reversed
Pacific Employers Insurance Company v. Industrial Accident Commission of California	306 U.S. 493 (1939)	Stone	7-0[a]	none	none	certiorari to the California Supreme Court (Cal.)	affirmed
Bonet v. Yabucoa Sugar Company	306 U.S. 505 (1939)	Black	8-0	none	none	certiorari to the United States Court of Appeals for the First Circuit (1st Cir.)	reversed
State Tax Commission of Utah v. Van Cott	306 U.S. 511 (1939)	Black	7-0[d]	none	none	certiorari to the Utah Supreme Court (Utah)	vacated
Lowden v. Simonds-Shields-Lonsdale Grain Company	306 U.S. 516 (1939)	Reed	8-0	none	none	certiorari to the United States Court of Appeals for the Eighth Circuit (8th Cir.)	reversed
Helvering, Commissioner of Internal Revenue v. Metropolitan Edison Company	306 U.S. 522 (1939)	Roberts	8-0	none	none	certiorari to the United States Court of Appeals for the Third Circuit (3d Cir.)	affirmed
General Gas and Electric Corporation v. Commissioner	306 U.S. 530 (1939)	Roberts	8-0	none	none	certiorari to the United States Court of Appeals for the Second Circuit (2d Cir.)	reversed
Kohn v. Central Distributing Company	306 U.S. 531 (1939)	Hughes	8-0	none	none	appeal from the United States District Court for the Eastern District of Kentucky (E.D. Ky.)	affirmed
Higginbotham v. City of Baton Rouge	306 U.S. 535 (1939)	Hughes	8-0	none	none	appeal from the Louisiana Supreme Court (La.)	affirmed
Honeyman v. Jacobs	306 U.S. 539 (1939)	Hughes	8-0	none	none	appeal from the New York Supreme Court (N.Y. Sup. Ct.)	affirmed
Carrier v. Bryant	306 U.S. 545 (1939)	McReynolds	8-0	none	none	certiorari to the North Carolina Supreme Court (N.C.)	affirmed
Honolulu Oil Corporation v. Halliburton	306 U.S. 550 (1939)	Butler	7-0[d]	none	none	certiorari to the United States Court of Appeals for the Ninth Circuit (9th Cir.)	reversed (one case); affirmed (one case)
Atlas Life Insurance Company v. W.I. Southern, Inc.	306 U.S. 563 (1939)	Stone	8-0	none	none	certified questions from the United States Court of Appeals for the Tenth Circuit (10th Cir.)	dismissed
Wilentz v. Sovereign Camp, Woodmen	306 U.S. 573 (1939)	Stone	8-0	none	none	appeal from the United States District Court for the District of New Jersey (D.N.J.)	dismissed
Clark, Director of Department of Motor Vehicles of California v. Paul Gray, Inc.	306 U.S. 583 (1939)	Stone	8-0	Black (short statement)	none	appeal from the United States District Court for the Southern District of California (S.D. Cal.)	reversed
National Labor Relations Board v. Fain-Blatt	306 U.S. 601 (1939)	Stone	6–2	none	McReynolds and Butler (opinion; joined by Butler)	certiorari to the United States Court of Appeals for the Third Circuit (3d Cir.)	reversed

[a] Frankfurter took no part in the case (he joined the Court on January 30, 1939, and so did not participate in cases argued before that date)
[b] Roberts took no part in the case
[c] Stone took no part in the case
[d] Hughes took no part in the case
