= Conflict of laws in the United States =

Conflict of laws in the United States is the field of procedural law dealing with choice of law rules when a legal action implicates the substantive laws of more than one jurisdiction and a court must determine which law is most appropriate to resolve the action. In the United States, the rules governing these matters have diverged from the traditional rules applied internationally. The outcome of this process may require a court in one jurisdiction to apply the law of a different jurisdiction.

The federal Constitution created a "plurilegal federal union" in which there are four types of conflicts between different legal systems: federal vs. state, federal vs. foreign, state vs. state, and state vs. foreign. The first type are vertical conflicts resolved by federal preemption pursuant to the Supremacy Clause (and is therefore analyzed as an issue of constitutional law), meaning that conflict of laws in the United States focuses on the latter three types. The complexity of American federalism and massive interstate diversity between the laws of the 50 states in the Union mean that U.S. federal and state courts as of the mid-2010s were deciding around 5,000 conflict-of-laws cases each year—far more than the courts of any other country. As a result, Americans have accumulated "vast judicial experience in resolving conflicts cases".

== New approaches in the United States ==
Until the 20th century, traditional choice of law rules were based on the principle that legal rights vest automatically at legally significant and ascertainable times and places. For example, a dispute regarding property would be decided by the law of the place the property was located. Disputes in tort would be decided by the place where the injury occurred.

During the first half of the 20th century, the traditional conflict of laws approach came under criticism from some members of the U.S. legal community who saw it as rigid and arbitrary; the traditional method sometimes forced application of the laws of a state with no connection to either party, except that a tort or contract claim arose between the parties in that state. This period of intellectual ferment (which coincided with the rise of the legal realism movement) gave birth to a number of innovative new approaches.

=== Renvoi ===
Courts may look for a provision in the law of the choice of law state that permits the court to use the lex fori, i.e. law of the forum state. For example, suppose State X has a rule that says that if property located in State X is conveyed by a contract entered into in any other state, then the law of that other state will govern the validity of the contract. Suppose also that State Y has a rule that says that if a contract entered into in State Y conveys property located in any other state, then the law of that other state will govern the validity of the contract. Now suppose that party A conveys land located in State X to party B through a contract entered into in State Y. If a lawsuit arising from that transaction is brought in State X, the law of State X requires the courts of that state to apply the law of the state where the contract was made, which is state Y. However, the courts of State X might note that a court in State Y would apply the law of State X, because that is where the land is located, and the law of State Y follows the land.

Most U.S. states frown upon renvoi in a choice of law situation. In this example, they would insist that the only law the courts of State X should look at is the law of contracts of State Y, not the "whole law" of State Y, which includes that state's law governing choice of law. The basic criticism of renvoi is that it can lead to an endless circle. In the above example, it could be argued that if the law of State Y points back to State X, then the law of State X would only once again require application of the law of State Y, and so forth and so on without end.

=== Significant contacts ===
The significant contacts test evaluates the contacts between the states and each party to the case, and determines which state has the most significant contacts with the litigation as a whole. This test has been criticized for failing to respect the sovereignty of the state in which the cause of action arose, and because courts can tip the balance in one way or another in deciding which contacts are significant.

=== Seat of the relationship ===
The seat of the relationship test specifically examines the relationship between the parties to the lawsuit, and uses the law of the state in which the relationship between the parties was most significant. This test is strongly associated with the writings of Friedrich Carl von Savigny. For example, if two people who live in State X meet and develop a relationship in State Y, and a cause of action arises between them while they are traveling through State Z, a court of any state applying this test would probably apply the law of State Y, because that state is the seat of the relationship between these two parties.

=== Governmental interests ===
The governmental interests test examines the interests of the states themselves, and the reasons for which the laws in question were passed. It is the brainchild of University of Chicago law professor Brainerd Currie, who outlined the test in a series of articles during the 1950s and 1960s. Currie's revolutionary work "dominated American choice-of-law thinking in the United States for almost half a century". Although Currie's critics now outnumber his defenders, interest analysis is still the most popular vehicle for teaching conflict of laws in American law schools, and it provides "the very language of contemporary conflicts theory". In interest analysis, the court must determine whether any conflict between the laws of the states is a true conflict, a false conflict, or an unprovided-for case.

- A true conflict occurs when one state offers a protection to a particular party that another state does not, and the court of the state that offers no such protection is asked to apply the law of the state offering the protection. For example, suppose A, lives in State X, which has no cap on tort damages for injuries received in an auto accident. B lives in State Y, which caps tort damages for injuries received in an auto accident at $100,000. While traveling through State X, B causes an auto accident in which A is seriously injured. A sues B in B's home State of Y, but asks the court there to apply the law of State X. In this situation, it can be argued that State X has chosen to place no limit on recovery in order to protect its citizens and keep its roads safer; while State Y has chosen to place a limit on tort damages to prevent tort abuse and keep insurance costs down. Therefore, State X's law protects its plaintiffs, and State Y's law protects its defendants - the laws serve opposite purposes, but each state has an interest in its own law being applied, to advance its own purposes.
  - In such a case, if the interests are balanced, the law of the forum will prevail.
- A false or apparent conflict occurs when the state offering the protection has no actual interest in the endorsement of that protection against the particular parties to the case. For example, some states prohibit spouses from suing one another for negligent torts, in order to prevent them from colluding in order to collect from insurance companies. Other states permit such suits, on the theory that people should be able to recover for their injuries, and possible collusion can be presented as a factor for the jury to deal with. Suppose that a couple, A and B, live in state X, which prohibits these suits, and they travel to state Y, which permits these suits. While in state Y, A negligently injures B, and upon their return to state X, B sues A in the court of state X, asserting that the law of state Y should govern. In this case, since neither party is from state Y, state Y has no interest in the application of the law to these persons.
- An unprovided-for case is one in which each party is seeking to apply the law of the other state. For example, suppose State X has a law that limits recovery in a tort suit, and state Y has no such limit. A plaintiff from State X suing a defendant from State Y will want the rule of State Y to apply rather than the limit imposed by state X; the defendant will want the State X's limit to apply.
  - In such a case, the law of the forum will prevail.

The greatest flaw with Currie's analysis—and the reason it has been subject to harsh criticism for many years—is that in the real world, false conflicts and apparent conflicts are both relatively rare. Therefore, "almost all roads lead to the lex fori". Currie aggressively defended this outcome, but as Arthur Taylor von Mehren observed, widespread adoption of his style of analysis at the international and interstate levels would result in "a legal order characterized by chaos and retaliation". Some courts have sought to distinguish different types of law, giving more weight to laws of foreign states that are intended to regulate conduct (e.g. prohibitions on disfavored activities), and less weight to laws of foreign states that are intended to allocate losses (e.g. tort immunity for charitable organizations; joint and several liability).

=== Comparative impairment ===
The comparative impairment test asks which state's policies would suffer more if their law was not applied. It is a refinement of interest analysis developed by William F. Baxter. It is similar to interest analysis, in that the interests of the state are taken into account—however, this test does not look to see which state benefits more from the application of its laws, but rather for situations in which the other state's interests will actually be harmed by the application of the laws of the forum state.

=== Better law ===
Currie and most of his American contemporaries remained loyal to the classical approach to the conflict of laws in one important aspect: they generally believed that the basic purpose of conflicts law was to achieve "the spatially best solution" (that is, "conflicts justice"), rather than "the materially best solution" (that is, "material justice"). In contrast, law professor Robert A. Leflar was one of the first people to openly advocate the latter concept of material justice as the objective of conflicts law. Towards that end, in 1966 he proposed a list of five considerations to guide courts in resolving conflicts problems, of which the last one was application of "the better rule of law". The critical flaw with his argument was that "nothing prevents the better-law criterion from becoming decisive" in the numerous cases where the first four considerations were not dispositive.

Use of the so-called "better law" test, like renvoi, is frowned upon because it appears to be little more than a gimmick to allow a court to apply the law of its own state. The test itself presupposes that, between the laws presented by the two or more states in which the action arose, there is one set of laws which is empirically better. Because courts will almost always presume that their own state has better laws, this is effectively a device to avoid applying choice-of-law principles altogether.

=== Most significant relationship ===
In 1952, the American Law Institute initiated the development of the Restatement (Second) of Conflict of Laws under the supervision of Reporter Willis L.M. Reese, and promulgated its final version in 1969. The Restatement (Second)'s approach is "a conscious compromise and synthesis between the old and new schools (and among the various branches of the new schools)".

The first "cornerstone" of the Restatement (Second) and the most important of its 423 sections is Section 6, which lists seven lengthy factors to be considered by the court. These factors do not supply an actual choice of law but are merely intended to help the court apply the other sections of the Restatement (which repeatedly incorporate Section 6 by reference).

The second "cornerstone" of the Restatement (Second) is its "most significant relationship" test. This sounds like Savigny's seat of the relationship test, but the resemblance is superficial and the actual test is quite different. The key difference is that the Restatement (Second) focuses on narrowly defined "issues" rather than "relationships" and requires an individualized issue-by-issue analysis. The state with the most significant relationship is not determined "by the quantity or even the closeness of its factual contacts", but under the factors stated in Section 6.

Under the Restatement (Second), one first identifies what type of legal issue is at stake, then determines whether the Restatement (Second) has already prescribed a rule for that specific issue, and then evaluates whether that rule by its terms must be rigidly applied or can be overruled in favor of the state with the most significant relationship as determined with the assistance of the Section 6 factors.

For a few issues, especially property and succession, the Restatement (Second) provides clear black-letter rules to be mechanically applied. For some issues, such as torts, the Restatement (Second) provides presumptive rules to be tentatively applied unless "some other state has a more significant relationship" as determined under the factors listed in Section 6.

For some issues in contracts and torts, the Restatement (Second) is "more equivocal" and provides rules to be "usually" applied. Finally, for the most difficult issues, the Restatement (Second) does not take a stand as to whether any one state's law should control and merely lists a "non-exclusive, non-hierarchical list of the factual contacts or connecting factors" to be considered in light of the factors listed in Section 6. This seems to imply that the policy analysis of the Section 6 factors should be the more important side of the conflicts analysis, but in applying the Restatement (Second), many courts simply analyze factual contacts first and turn to Section 6 analysis only when the factual contacts are evenly balanced.

== United States Constitutional limitations ==
The United States Supreme Court has held that there are certain limitations imposed by the U.S. Constitution on the ability of states to apply their own law to events occurring in other states.

In one of the earliest cases in this area, Home Insurance Co. v. Dick, 281 U.S. 397 (1930), the Court held that the state of Texas could not constitutionally apply its own rule invalidating contract clauses that required any statute of limitations under two years to a contract that had no relation to Texas beyond the fact that the plaintiff was a Texas resident. The plaintiff had sued a New York reinsurer of a Mexican corporation that was primarily insured in Mexico, which is where the "injury" had occurred when a tugboat owned by the company was lost in a fire. The plaintiff was living in Mexico at the time (although not a resident), but returned to Texas to file suit. These contacts were insufficient to satisfy the Due Process Clause of the Fourteenth Amendment.

The doctrine steadily developed in a series of cases over the following decades. In Pacific Employers Insurance Co. v. Industrial Accident Commission, 306 U.S. 493 (1939), the court held that there was no violation of the Full Faith and Credit Clause where the state of California applied its own law to a case in which a Massachusetts employee of a Massachusetts corporation sued his employer for an injury received in California, seeking relief that would be unavailable under the law of Massachusetts.

This was reaffirmed in Watson v. Employers Liability Assurance Corp., 348 U.S. 66 (1954) held that neither the Full Faith and Credit Clause nor the Fourteenth Amendment was implicated when a couple who had bought an insurance policy in Illinois and then moved to Louisiana sued the issuer of the policy under a provision in the Louisiana law that permitted such suits. A decade later, in Clay v. Sun Insurance Office, Ltd., 377 U.S. 179 (1964), the court explicitly stated that insurance travels with the insured, and that policy holders who move from one state to another can expect to have the laws of their new domicile apply to the interpretation of the insurer's liabilities on the policy.

Allstate Insurance Co. v. Hague, 449 U.S. 302 (1981) determined that the same analysis applies to both the Full Faith and Credit Clause and the Fourteenth Amendment; and that both are satisfied so long as there are sufficient aggregate contacts between the forum and the event giving rise to the cause of action. In the case itself, a Wisconsin resident who was employed over the state line in Minnesota was killed in a motorcycle accident in Wisconsin. The decedent's wife then moved to Minnesota, where she was appointed administratrix of her husband's estate. She sued the insurance company to recover a higher amount permitted under Minnesota law, and the courts agreed that this was permissible, because of the combination of the decedent's employment contacts with the state, and the insurance company's commercial contacts with the state.

In Phillips Petroleum Co. v. Shutts, 472 U.S. 797 (1985), plaintiffs residing in all fifty states brought a class-action suit in the state courts of Kansas against an oil company that had failed to pay interest on certain leases. The Kansas court hearing the case simply assumed that the law of Kansas was adequate for all the claims. The Supreme Court disagreed, holding that the Kansas court was required to determine the law of each state on the substantive questions of law, and apply the laws of each state to the claims brought by plaintiffs from that state. In the related case of Sun Oil Co. v. Wortman, 486 U.S. 717 (1988), the Court refused to apply this rule when Kansas had chosen to apply its own statute of limitations to causes raised by a diverse population of class-action plaintiffs. There the Court held that they had long been viewed as procedural matters. The states could choose to use their own with no concern for violating the Constitution.

== See also ==
- Federal preemption – doctrine addressing a vertical conflict between federal and state sovereigns, in contrast to horizontal conflict of laws between coequal state sovereigns
