= Federal prison =

Type of prison operated under the jurisdiction of a federal government

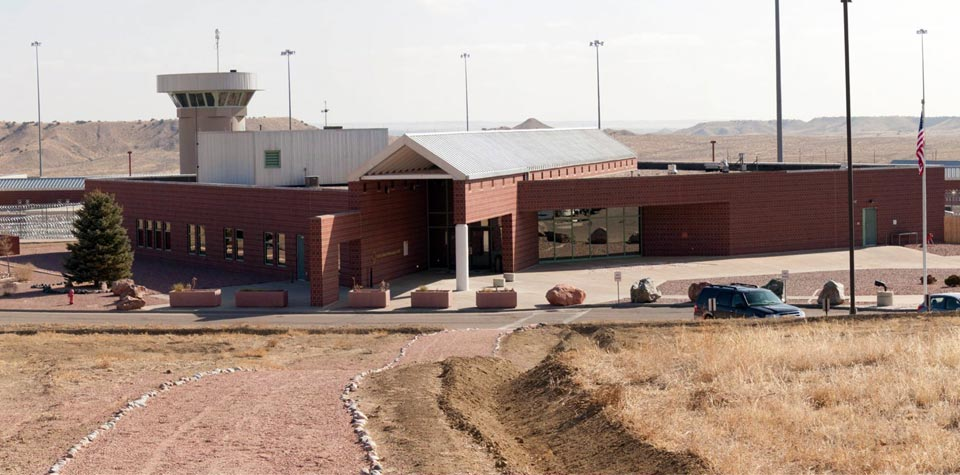
ADX Florence, a US federal prison

A federal prison is operated under the jurisdiction of a federal government as opposed to a state or provincial body. Federal prisons are used for people who violated federal law (U.S., Mexico), people considered dangerous (Brazil), or those sentenced to longer terms of imprisonment (Canada). Not all federated countries have a legal concept of "federal prison".

== Australia ==
The Australian federal government directly controls only a few detention facilities. These include: the Defence Force Correctional Establishment, immigration detention facilities and, in some territories, holding cells at Australian Federal Police stations.

While the vast majority of criminal prosecutions in Australia take place in state or territory court systems under state or territory law, there are cases in federal courts, under federal law (such as the Crimes Act 1914), that require the imprisonment or remanding of individuals. Unlike other countries with federal systems of government, however, the Constitution of Australia explicitly requires state and territory governments to reserve room in their prison systems for federal prisoners. According to Section 120 of the Constitution: "Every State shall make provision for the detention in its prisons of persons accused or convicted of offences against the laws of the Commonwealth, and for the punishment of persons convicted of such offences, and the Parliament of the Commonwealth may make laws to give effect to this provision." Accordingly, civilians who have, in a federal court, been sentenced to imprisonment or remanded in custody, are detained in state or territory prison, under arrangements with state and territory governments.

== Brazil ==
The Brazil federal prison system (Sistema Penitenciário Federal) was implemented in 2006 based on the provisions of the 1984 law "Lei de Execução Penal". It receives the most dangerous criminals who would be disruptive in state prisons.

== Canada ==
In Canada, the Correctional Service of Canada operates federal penitentiaries, which house inmates with sentences of two years or more; provincial prisons are responsible for those with shorter terms.

== Germany ==
The prisons in Germany are run solely by the federal states, although governed by a federal law.

== Mexico ==
The federal prison system in Mexico is run by the Secretariat of Public Security and receives prisoners sentenced and being processed for federal crimes.

== Russia ==
All penal establishments in the Russian Federation are governed by the Federal Penitentiary Service.

== United States ==
The Federal Bureau of Prisons (BOP), established with the passing of the Three Prisons Act of 1891, is responsible for the administration of federal prison facilities in the United States, as well as the custody and welfare of federal inmates. The BOP also provides researchers with background information and statistics regarding the Federal Prison System.
