= Watson v. Employers Liability Assurance Corp. =

- Supreme Court of the United States
- Full case name: Watson v. Employers Liability Assurance Corp.
- Citations: 348 U.S. 66 (more)

Watson v. Employers Liability Assurance Corp., 348 U.S. 66 (1954), was a conflict of laws case decided by the Supreme Court of the United States.

== Facts ==
Plaintiff was injured in Louisiana by a home-perm product made by an Illinois company which was insured by the defendant Massachusetts company, the insurance policy having been negotiated and issued in Massachusetts. The Plaintiff brought suit under a Louisiana law which lets tort victims sue the insurer directly. However, the insurance contract has a clause recognized as binding in Massachusetts and Illinois that prohibits such direct suits. Under Louisiana law, the defendant had consented to direct suits in order to do business in Louisiana.

== Issue ==
Is Louisiana's application of Louisiana law to this contract constitutional?

== Rule ==
A state's legitimate interest in safeguarding the rights of persons injured there allows that state to apply its own law to redress the injury without violating the Due Process Clause of the Fourteenth Amendment to the United States Constitution. Where a contract affects people in various states, those states are not automatically bound by the Full Faith and Credit Clause to apply the other state's contract law.

== Result ==
Louisiana's interest in taking care of persons injured there (and probably paying medical bills there too) outweighs the interests of Massachusetts in the contract, so it is no violation of Fourteenth Amendment Due Process or Full Faith and Credit Clause to apply Louisiana law.
