= Chapter Five =

Chapter Five refers to a fifth chapter in a book.

Chapter Five, Chapter 5, or Chapter V may also refer to:

== Albums ==
- Chapter 5: Letter, a 2002 album by g.o.d.
- Chapter V: Underrated, a Syleena Johnson album, 2011
- Chapter V (Staind album), 2005
- Chapter V (Trey Songz album), 2012
- Chapter V: Unbent, Unbowed, Unbroken, a HammerFall album, 2005

== Television ==
- "Chapter 5" (American Horror Story)
- "Chapter 5" (Eastbound & Down)
- "Chapter 5" (House of Cards)
- "Chapter 5" (Legion)
- "Chapter 5" (Star Wars: Clone Wars), an episode of Star Wars: Clone Wars
- "Chapter 5" (Uncoupled)
- "Chapter 5: Crypt", an episode of A Murder at the End of the World
- "Chapter 5: The Gunslinger", an episode of The Mandalorian
- "Chapter 5: Return of the Mandalorian", an episode of The Book of Boba Fett
- "Chapter Five" (Boston Public)
- "Chapter Five: Do Your Job", an episode of Barry
- "Chapter Five: Dreams in a Witch House", an episode of Chilling Adventures of Sabrina
- "Chapter Five: Heart of Darkness", an episode of Riverdale
- "Chapter Five: Song for a Winter's Night", an episode of Katy Keene
- "Chapter Five: Vagina Momologues", an episode of Special
- Episodes of Stranger Things:
  - "Chapter Five: The Flea and the Acrobat", season 1
  - "Chapter Five: Dig Dug", season 2
  - "Chapter Five: The Source", season 3
  - "Chapter Five: The Nina Project", season 4
  - "Chapter Five: Shock Jock", season 5

== Other uses ==
- Chapter V of the Constitution of Australia
- Chapter V of the United Nations Charter
