= Leeth v Commonwealth =

Australian High Court decision

- Court: High Court of Australia
- Argued: 24 September 1991
- Decided: 25 June 1992
- Citations: [1992] HCA 29, (1992) 174 CLR 455

Court membership
- Judges sitting: Mason CJ, Brennan, Deane, Dawson, Toohey, Gaudron and McHugh JJ

Case opinions
- (4:3) The law in question was a valid law even though the non-parole periods differed between States (per Mason CJ, Dawson, McHugh & Brennan JJ; Deane, Toohey & Gaudron JJ dissenting)

Leeth v Commonwealth, is a High Court of Australia case that held that there was no implied right of legal equality in the Australian Constitution.

== Background ==
The Commonwealth Prisoners Act, provided for a non-parole period, which differed depending on which State the prisoner was convicted in. The claim was that the Act authorised the unequal treatment of Commonwealth offenders.

== Decision ==
Mason CJ, Dawson and McHugh JJ denied that the Constitution contained an implied right to substantive legal equality, and only recognised procedural inequality. Deane and Toohey JJ found an implied right substantive equality, and while Gaudron and Brennan JJ did not agree with Deane and Toohey JJ, they did not disagree either. However, Brennan J did not agree that the right had been violated, and thus there was a majority for the outcome that the Act was not invalid.

The basis for the implied right of substantive equality (as advocated by Deane and Toohey JJ) comes from the fact that the constitution is a free agreement between the people of the colonies, and these pre-existing rights continued after federation. In the absence of words that deny such equality, these pre-existing rights should continue to exist. This notion of equality is said to be vested in the courts as created in Chapter III of the Constitution, and these courts are to treat them "fairly" and "impartially".

== See also ==
- Australian constitutional law
- Section 120 of the Constitution of Australia
