= Phillips Petroleum Co. v. Shutts =

- Supreme Court of the United States

Argued February 25, 1985 Decided June 26, 1985
- Full case name: Phillips Petroleum Company v. Shutts et al.
- Docket no.: 84-233
- Citations: 472 U.S. 797 (more) 105 S. Ct. 2965; 86 L. Ed. 2d 628; 1985 U.S. LEXIS 104

Court membership
- Chief Justice Warren E. Burger Associate Justices William J. Brennan Jr. · Byron White; Thurgood Marshall · Harry Blackmun; Lewis F. Powell Jr. · William Rehnquist; John P. Stevens · Sandra Day O'Connor

Case opinions
- Majority: Rehnquist, joined by Burger, Brennan, White, Marshall, Blackmun, O'Connor
- Concur/dissent: Stevens
- Powell took no part in the consideration or decision of the case.

Phillips Petroleum Co. v. Shutts, 472 U.S. 797 (1985), was a conflict of laws case decided by the United States Supreme Court.

== Facts ==
Phillips Petroleum Company was sued in a class action lawsuit in Kansas for overdue interest payments. The lawsuit was joined by plaintiffs from all fifty U.S. states. The Kansas courts applied Kansas law to determine the legal liability of the defendant and remedies as to all plaintiffs, including the 97% who had no contacts with Kansas. Phillips appealed, arguing that the trial court had to look to the laws of different states for different plaintiffs. The Kansas Supreme Court upheld the decision, finding that it is permissible for the absent plaintiffs to have less contact with Kansas than the defendants, and that these plaintiffs have chosen Kansas law. The Kansas Supreme Court found that forum law controlled absent 'compelling reasons' for another law to control, comparing the suit to one against a 'common fund' in Kansas.

Phillips also noted that many of the absent plaintiffs were absent because they were deemed to have 'consented' to be represented by the class representative by not returning a form to opt-out of the litigation. Phillips contended that failure of the absent plaintiffs to request exclusion can not equal consent, and therefore that the Kansas court has no jurisdiction over the claims of absent plaintiffs. Phillips asserted that adverse decisions of Kansas court may bind absent plaintiffs by res judicata.

== Issues ==
The Supreme Court addressed two questions. The first was whether the use of Kansas law for all plaintiffs violated Fourteenth Amendment Due Process, or the Full Faith and Credit Clause. The second was whether it was sufficient to distribute a form and then deem the recipients to be a party to the litigation if they did not opt out of the litigation.

== Result ==
The Supreme Court held that the defendant's desire is irrelevant, otherwise forum shopping would rule. However, it also found that the state can not use assumption of jurisdiction as weight towards applying its own law. The use of Kansas law for all plaintiffs was held to be arbitrary and unfair; Kansas must consider the law of each state from which parties have come.

As for the opt-out issue, fewer burdens on plaintiffs means less Due Process required, so opt-out was permissible.

Court notes that individual stakes are too small for the case to be brought as anything but a class action – no one would go to the expense of suing for $100, so plaintiffs get no day in court other than this action. Opt-out is enough, so long as state provides a process where absent plaintiffs get notice and opportunity to be heard.

As for minimum contacts, class action plaintiffs need no contacts if they consent to jurisdiction.

=== Concurring opinion ===
Justice Stevens wrote that Kansas actually did examine laws of other states and found no direct or substantive conflict; ergo, no problem with Kansas applying Kansas law.
