= Certified question =

Questions of law appealed to higher courts

In the law of the United States, a certified question is a formal request from one court to another court, usually but not always in another jurisdiction, for an opinion on a question of law.

These cases typically arise when the court before which litigation is actually pending is required to decide a matter that turns on the law of another state or jurisdiction. If that other jurisdiction's law is unclear or uncertain, a certified question can then be sent to that jurisdiction's courts to render an opinion on the question of law that arose in the court in which the actual litigation is pending. The courts to whom these questions of law are certified are typically appellate courts or state supreme courts.

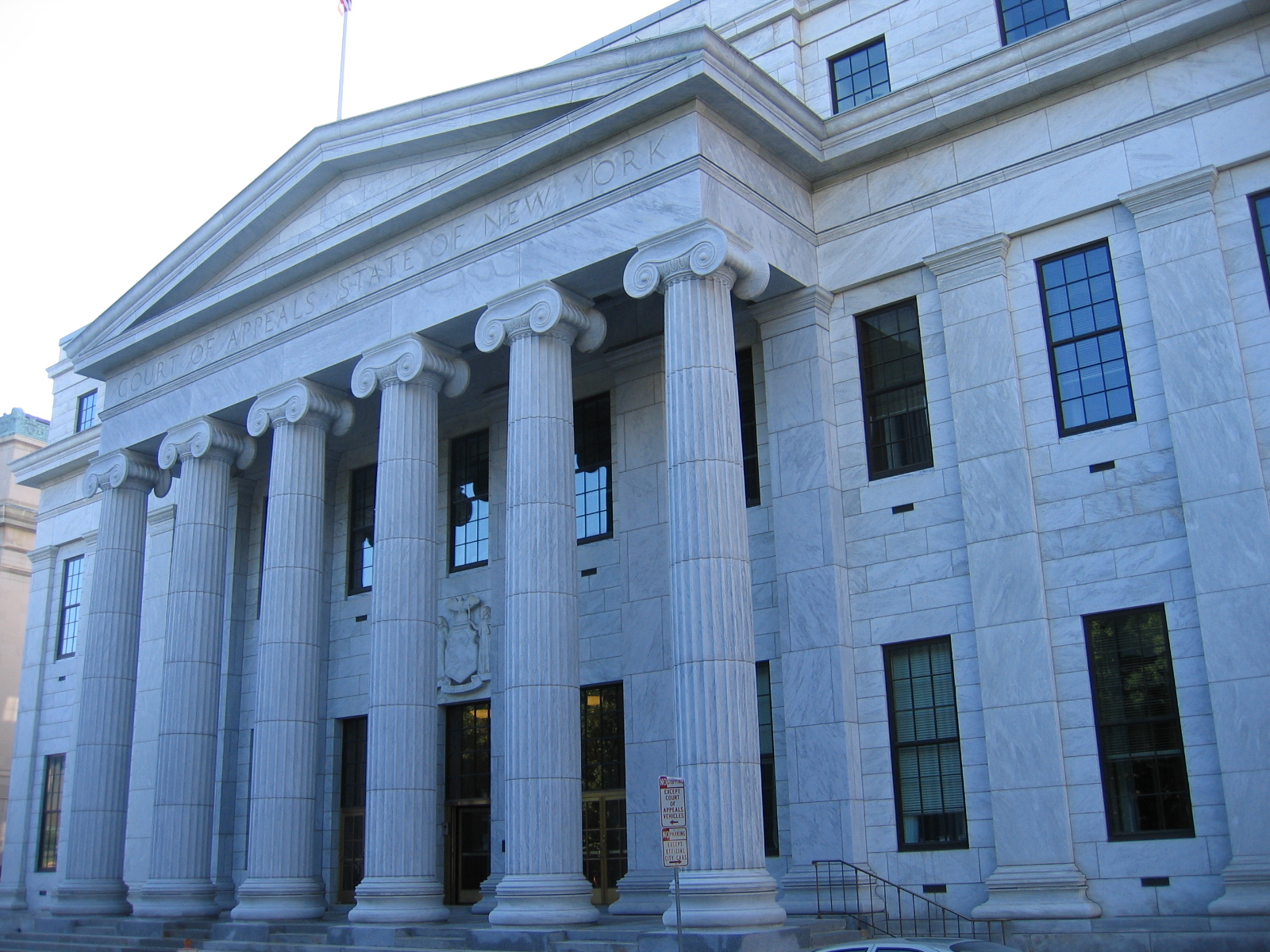
In 1985, the New York Court of Appeals, the highest court in New York, was authorized by constitutional amendment to accept certified questions.

== History ==
Historically, the procedure under which one court certifies a question to another, arises out of the distinction in the law of England between common law courts and equity courts. At one time, these two were separate and parallel legal systems, differing in procedure and the sort of case each had primary jurisdiction over. From time to time, a legal issue would arise in one court that fell within the other's jurisdiction and expertise; in this situation, the two courts could certify legal questions to each other. This remains possible in the state of Delaware, which continues to have a separate Court of Chancery. Charles Dickens made reference to the process of the two separate courts certifying questions to each other as a part of the interminable litigation in Jarndyce v. Jarndyce which figures in the plot of Bleak House:

Equity sends questions to law, law sends questions back to equity; law finds it can't do this, equity finds it can't do that; neither can so much as say it can't do anything, without this solicitor instructing and this counsel appearing for A, and that solicitor instructing and that counsel appearing for B; and so on through the whole alphabet, like the history of the apple pie.

In Clay v. Sun Insurance Office, Ltd., the United States Supreme Court confronted a situation where a circuit court of appeals could not "make a competent guess" about how the Florida courts would construe an insurance statute. The court observed that the Florida legislature had passed a statute allowing the federal courts to certify questions of state law to the Florida Supreme Court, but that the Florida courts had not yet made a rule establishing procedures under the statute. After the Clay decision, the various states began to adopt statutes or rules allowing for the certification of questions of state law to state courts. The relatively streamlined process of sending a certified question to a state appellate court also relieves federal courts of the unwieldy procedure of Pullman abstention, under which Federal courts abstain from deciding on the constitutionality of state laws while litigation seeking the construction of those laws is pending in state courts. In 1967, a Uniform Act was first proposed to establish a standard procedure for certified questions. In Lehman Bros. v. Schein, the Supreme Court praised the certified question procedure as helping to build a cooperative judicial federalism.

As of 2014, forty-nine states, the District of Columbia, Guam, the Northern Mariana Islands, and Puerto Rico have established procedures under which questions of state and local law may be certified to their courts. Only the state supreme court of North Carolina lacks a certification process. Additionally, although Missouri has a certification statute, its supreme court has held that it has no jurisdiction under the state constitution to answer certified questions.

== Certification of questions to state courts ==
=== Between state and federal courts ===
The typical case involving a certified question involves a Federal court, which because of diversity, supplemental, or removal jurisdiction is presented with a question of state law. In these situations, the Erie doctrine requires the Federal court that acquires jurisdiction over cases governed in part by state law to apply the substantive law of the states.

Generally, the Erie doctrine requires the Federal court to predict how the courts of a given state would rule and decide a given issue. Many states, however, allow certified questions to be addressed from the Federal court to the appellate court or state supreme court of that state, allowing the state court to decide those questions of law.

The state courts issuing these rulings do not consider the issuance of these rulings to be advisory opinions; they relate to genuine disputes, even though those disputes are actually pending in another court. Some state supreme courts have held that the state supreme court possesses an inherent judicial power to decide state law controversies submitted by other jurisdictions, even in the absence of a statute or rule authorizing these answers. Other state courts have interpreted their states' constitutions in a manner similar to the Federal interpretation of the cases and controversies clause of the United States Constitution. The Federal courts hold that this clause restricts a court's authority to rule on moot or unripe controversies over which that court may not have jurisdiction; states that follow this rule will generally not answer certified questions of state law. In some of those states, the power to issue rulings on certified questions has been granted to the courts by constitutional amendment.

Many states, by legislation or by judicial rule making, have adopted a Uniform Act called the Uniform Certification of Questions of Law Act. The uniform act provides that a state supreme court may answer questions of law certified to it by the United States Supreme Court, a court of appeals of the United States, a United States district court, or the highest appellate or intermediate appellate court of any other state. The certifying court must certify the question in writing, and the state court will accept jurisdiction and decide the issue if:

1. "questions of law of this state are involved in any proceeding before the certifying court which may be determinative of the proceeding"; or
2. "it appears to the certifying court there is no controlling precedent in the decisions of the supreme court of this state."

=== In state courts ===
In some states, the name "certified question" is given to what is also known as an interlocutory appeal, a procedure under which an appellate court, at its discretion, may review a decision made by a trial court that has been made before a final judgment has been entered, and that ordinarily could not be appealed directly.

== Certification of questions to the United States Supreme Court ==
Rule 19 of the Supreme Court Rules allows for the certification of legal questions to the United States Supreme Court. The rule provides that "a United States court of appeals may certify to this Court a question or proposition of law on which it seeks instruction for the proper decision of a case. The certificate shall contain a statement of the nature of the case and the facts on which the question or proposition of law arises. Only questions or propositions of law may be certified, and they shall be stated separately and with precision."

Certification of a question of law to the United States Supreme Court is another way, in addition to the writ of certiorari, direct appeal, and original jurisdiction, by which cases can be brought to the docket of the Supreme Court.

The procedure was first provided for by law in 1802, and for some cases was the only way they could reach the Supreme Court. It was commonly used in the 19th century and early 20th century; from 1927 to 1936, 72 questions were accepted, including one in Humphrey's Executor v. United States. From 1937 to 1946, 20 were accepted. Since 1946, certified questions have only been accepted in four cases:

- 1946 – United States v. Rice, a question from the 10th Circuit on reviewability of a case that had been sent from federal district court to state court in Oklahoma
- 1964 – United States v. Barnett, a question from the 5th Circuit on the right to a jury trial for criminal contempt charges
- 1974 – Moody v. Albemarle Paper Co., a question from the 4th Circuit as to whether retired judges could vote to rehear a case en banc
- 1981 – Iran National Airlines Corp. v. Marschalk Corp, three questions from the 2nd Circuit

Certified questions were notably rejected by the Supreme Court in Wisniewski v. United States (1957) and United States v. James Ford Seal (2009).

The procedure is rare because the Supreme Court has generally indicated that appellate courts should use their own judgement to decide cases, and because of the use of the alternative procedure "grant, vacate, remand". The Supreme Court has also been hostile to the idea of other courts forcing cases onto its docket.

== See also ==
- Certificate of division
- Case stated, a similar English procedure
- Preliminary reference, a similar European Union procedure
