= Home Insurance Co. v. Dick =

- Supreme Court of the United States

Argued February 27, 1930 Decided May 5, 1930
- Full case name: Home Insurance Co. v. Dick
- Citations: 281 U.S. 397 (more) 50 S. Ct. 338; 74 L. Ed. 926; 1930 U.S. LEXIS 396

Case history
- Prior: Appeal from the Supreme Court of Texas
- Subsequent: None

Holding
- A state can not apply its own law to invalidate clauses of a contract between a resident injured outside the state and a defendant with no contacts relating to the injury in the state.

Court membership
- Chief Justice Charles E. Hughes Associate Justices Oliver W. Holmes Jr. · Willis Van Devanter; James C. McReynolds · Louis Brandeis; George Sutherland · Pierce Butler; Harlan F. Stone

Case opinion
- Majority: Brandeis, joined by unanimous

Laws applied
- Due Process Clause of the Fourteenth Amendment

Home Insurance Co. v. Dick, 281 U.S. 397 (1930), was one of the earliest conflict of laws cases in which the United States Supreme Court held that the U.S. Constitution imposes certain limitations on the ability of states to apply their own law to events occurring in other states.

== Facts ==
In this case, C. J. Dick was a resident of Texas, but was living in Mexico, where he was operating a tugboat for a Mexican company. The tugboat was lost in a fire, and Dick returned to Texas to file a lawsuit against two New York-based reinsurers of the Mexican corporation that owned the boat. Later analysts have questioned whether the true facts of the case were really before the courts as it reached various levels of appeal:

Dick arose when a boat burned in Mexico. By the way, this may be the only hard fact in the case. By the time Dick reached the Supreme. Court, the facts as stated in Justice Brandeis's opinion were substantially, well, notional. But the important thing is what Justice Brandeis thought he was deciding.

Home Insurance Co. sought to dismiss the suit because Dick had waited more than a year to file the lawsuit, and a clause in the Home Insurance Co. insurance contract required that any action against it had to be brought within a year of the injury. Although this provision was valid under Mexican law, the Texas courts applied a Texas state law which deemed such clauses invalid unless they provided at least two years for the claimant to file a lawsuit.

== Opinion of the Court ==
The Court, in a unanimous opinion by Justice Brandeis, held that the state of Texas has no power to affect contracts made outside the state, and having no relation to anything done or to be done within the state. The state therefore could not constitutionally apply its own rule invalidating contract clauses that required any statute of limitations under two years to a contract that had no relation to Texas beyond the fact that the plaintiff was a Texas resident. These contacts were insufficient to satisfy the Due Process Clause of the Fourteenth Amendment.

The Supreme Court also rejected a number of defenses raised by Dick. First, the Court rejected claims that the state of Texas had a public policy interest in the outcome of the case, noting that Home Insurance Co. was basically dragged into the Texas courts against its will, and for a matter that did not involve an injury occurring in Texas or a party insured in Texas.

Second, the Court rejected the argument that it lacked subject matter jurisdiction for want of a federal question over a matter of local law. The Court rejected this argument because the case did not involve a local interpretation of the contract, but application of a law external to the contract itself.

Finally Dick contended that the Constitution does not require states to recognize laws of foreign countries. The court rejected this argument because the appeal raised a due process claim, not a claim under the Full Faith and Credit Clause. The court noted that due process applies to aliens, and in any case that the defendant here was a New York company.

== Later developments ==
The doctrine thereafter continued to steadily develop in a series of cases over the following decades. Within a few decades after the decision, the Supreme Court had also enunciated doctrines that would largely foreclose personal jurisdiction over the defendant in cases such as this.
