= Pacific Employers Insurance Co. v. Industrial Accident Commission =

- Supreme Court of the United States

Argued December 12, 1938 Decided March 27, 1939
- Full case name: Pacific Employers Insurance Co. v. Industrial Accident Commission
- Citations: 306 U.S. 493 (more) 59 S. Ct. 629; 83 L. Ed. 940

Case history
- Prior: Pac. Employers Ins. Co. v. Indus. Accident Comm'n, 10 Cal. 2d 567, 75 P.2d 1058 (1938); cert. granted, 305 U.S. 563 (1938).

Holding
- Federalism overcomes the Full Faith and Credit Clause where a state is enforcing its own laws on events occurring within the state.

Court membership
- Chief Justice Charles E. Hughes Associate Justices James C. McReynolds · Pierce Butler; Harlan F. Stone · Owen Roberts; Hugo Black · Stanley F. Reed; Felix Frankfurter

Case opinion
- Majority: Stone, joined by Hughes, Black, Reed, Roberts, McReynolds, Butler
- Frankfurter took no part in the consideration or decision of the case.

Pacific Employers Insurance Co. v. Industrial Accident Commission, 306 U.S. 493 (1939), was a conflict of laws case decided by the United States Supreme Court that held that principles of federalism overcome the Full Faith and Credit Clause if a state enforces its own laws on events occurring within the state.

== Background ==
The plaintiff, a Massachusetts resident, was employed as a chemical engineer and research chemist by Dewey & Almy Chemical Company, a Massachusetts company. The employee traveled to California to visit a branch factory, where he was injured. The employee filed a lawsuit in California seeking compensation for his injuries. The employer tried to assert as a defense that under Massachusetts law, a person covered under Massachusetts workman's compensation waived the right to sue an employer for damages.

The California courts found the Massachusetts law inapplicable to an injury occurring in California, and the employee received an award under California employee compensation law. The insurance companies responsible for paying the award and subrogating the payment appealed.

== Issue ==
The United States Supreme Court considered whether California's application of its own law to these circumstances violated the Full Faith and Credit Clause of the United States Constitution, which requires states to honor the laws of other states.

== Decision ==
The Court unanimously held that the principle of federalism overcomes the Full Faith and Credit Clause and that each state may exercise its own laws on events that occur within it. In this case, there was no Full Faith and Credit Clause violation because California merely applied its own law to events occurring in the state.
