= Washingtonian Publishing Co. v. Pearson =

- Supreme Court of the United States

Argued December 6, 1938 Decided January 30, 1939
- Full case name: Washingtonian Publishing Company v. Pearson
- Citations: 306 U.S. 30 (more) 59 S. Ct. 397; 83 L. Ed. 470

Holding
- The Copyright Act of 1909's deposit requirement did not require immediate deposit, or deposit before infringement occurs, in order to bring a suit for infringement.

Court membership
- Chief Justice Charles E. Hughes Associate Justices James C. McReynolds · Louis Brandeis; Pierce Butler · Harlan F. Stone; Owen Roberts · Hugo Black; Stanley F. Reed · Felix Frankfurter

Washingtonian Publishing Co. v. Pearson, 306 U.S. 30 (1939), was a United States Supreme Court case in which the Court held the Copyright Act of 1909's deposit requirement did not require immediate deposit, or deposit before infringement occurs, in order to bring a suit for infringement.

In 2018, the Supreme Court will hear Fourth Estate Public Benefit Corp. v. Wall-Street.com, which will answer the similar issue of "whether a copyright owner may commence an infringement suit after delivering the proper deposit, application, and fee to the Copyright Office, but before the Register of Copyrights has acted on the application for registration."
