= Section 118 of the Constitution of Australia =

Section 118 is a crucial element of the Constitution of Australia, as it provides for the validity of state laws, legal entities and court judgments within a federal commonwealth, and thereby allows the Commonwealth of Australia itself to function.

== Text ==
Section 118 is located within chapter 5 'The States', and stipulates: "Full faith and credit shall be given, throughout the Commonwealth, to the laws, the public Acts and records, and the judicial proceedings of any State".

== History ==
In the formation of the Australian constitution, "the bedrock principle was that the powers of the states would continue, subject to powers exclusively vested in the Commonwealth, or otherwise withdrawn from the states, and on this point there was no doubt or dissent". Section 118 was the thus a key mechanism whereby the powers of the states would continue within the new Commonwealth of Australia.

== Similarity to the Constitution of the United States ==
Provisions such as section 118 of the Australian constitution are common in federal constitutions. Section 118 of the Australian constitution follows closely the Full Faith and Credit Clause of the United States Constitution.

== Effect ==
The effect of section 118 is that in Australia, state laws, legal entities created under state legislation, and state court judgments, all have nationwide validity.
