= Chapter V of the Constitution of Australia =

State and federal government relations

Chapter V of the Constitution of Australia deals with the relationship between the states and the Commonwealth, and other matters pertaining to the states.

It is composed of fifteen sections, namely:

- Section 106: Saving of Constitutions
- Section 107: Saving of power of State Parliaments
- Section 108: Saving of State laws
- Section 109: Inconsistency of laws
- Section 110: Provisions referring to Governor
- Section 111: States may surrender territory
- Section 112: States may levy charges for inspection laws
- Section 113: Intoxicating liquids
- Section 114: States may not raise forces. Taxation of property of Commonwealth or State
- Section 115: States not to coin money
- Section 116: Commonwealth not to legislate in respect of religion
- Section 117: Rights of residents in States
- Section 118: Recognition of laws etc. of States
- Section 119: Protection of States from invasion and violence
- Section 120: Custody of offenders against laws of the Commonwealth
