= Taylor v. Standard Gas & Electric Co. =

Taylor v. Standard Gas and Electric Company
- Supreme Court of the United States

Argued January 5, 1939 Decided February 27, 1939
- Full case name: Taylor, et al., Independent Committee v. Standard Gas and Electric Company, et al.
- Citations: 306 U.S. 307 (more) 59 S. Ct. 543; 83 L. Ed. 669; 1939 U.S. LEXIS 972

Court membership
- Chief Justice Charles E. Hughes Associate Justices James C. McReynolds · Pierce Butler; Harlan F. Stone · Owen Roberts; Hugo Black · Stanley F. Reed; Felix Frankfurter

Case opinion
- Majority: Roberts, joined by Hughes, McReynolds, Butler, Stone, Black, Reed
- Frankfurter took no part in the consideration or decision of the case.

Taylor v. Standard Gas and Electric Company, 306 U.S. 307 (1939), was an important United States Supreme Court case in corporate and bankruptcy law that lbecame the foundation of what is known as the "Deep Rock doctrine" This holds that claims against an insolvent subsidiary by controlling shareholders or other insiders, like managers or directors, may be subordinated to the claims of other creditors under equitable principles.

== Facts ==
The Deep Rock Oil Corporation was an undercapitalized subsidiary of the defendant Standard Gas Company.

== Judgment ==
The Supreme Court held that, where a subsidiary corporation declares bankruptcy and an insider or controlling shareholder of that subsidiary corporation asserts claims as a creditor against the subsidiary, loans made by the insider to the subsidiary corporation may be deemed to receive the same treatment as shares of stock owned by the insider.

Therefore, the insider's claims will be subordinated to the claims of all other creditors, i.e. other creditors will be paid first, and if there is nothing left after other creditors are paid then the insider gets nothing. This also applies (and indeed the doctrine was first established) where a parent company asserts such claims against its own subsidiary.

The doctrine will be applied where equity requires, particularly where the subsidiary was undercapitalized at the time that it was established, and can thereby be shown to have been mismanaged for the parent corporation's benefit.

== See also ==
- US corporate law
