= NLRB v. Sands Manufacturing Co. =

NLRB v. Sands Mfg. Co.
- Supreme Court of the United States

Argued January 12, 1939 Decided February 27, 1939
- Full case name: National Labor Relations Board v. Sands Manufacturing Co.
- Citations: 306 U.S. 332 (more) 59 S. Ct. 508; 83 L. Ed. 682; 1939 U.S. LEXIS 1094

Case history
- Prior: On appeal from the United States Circuit Court of Appeals for the Sixth Circuit

Holding
- The NLRA does not prohibit an employer from disciplining or firing an individual employee when that employee violates a collective bargain agreement by striking.

Court membership
- Chief Justice Charles E. Hughes Associate Justices James C. McReynolds · Pierce Butler; Harlan F. Stone · Owen Roberts; Hugo Black · Stanley F. Reed; Felix Frankfurter

Case opinions
- Majority: Roberts, joined by Hughes, McReynolds, Butler, Stone
- Dissent: Black, Reed
- Frankfurter took no part in the consideration or decision of the case.

Laws applied
- National Labor Relations Act

National Labor Relations Board v. Sands Manufacturing Co., 306 U.S. 332 (1939), is United States labor law case, decided by a majority of 5 to 2 by the Supreme Court of the United States, which overturned a decision by the National Labor Relations Board because it was not supported by substantial evidence. The Court defined collective bargaining under the National Labor Relations Act to mean that proposals and responses to proposals were pending, and that future meetings were being planned. Absent such conditions, bargaining was not occurring. The Court also held that an employer did not violate the Act if it chose to deal with the employees on an individual basis.

== Facts ==
Sands Manufacturing Co. was a company based in Cleveland, Ohio, which made water heaters. In the spring of 1934, its employees joined the Mechanics Educational Society of America. A 60-day contract was agreed to, and although it expired both sides repeatedly agreed to extend it. When workload lessened, company policy was to transfer men in slack departments to those areas where workload was high, respecting both their seniority and existing pay rates. In 1934, the company won a government contract, and agreed that the "new men" would not only be paid a lower wage but also would be the first discharged once work slacked off. A new contract was reached in June 1935 in which management won the right not to respect the wage rates and seniority rights of men transferred to new departments during slack times.

As the government contract ended, the company closed the heater tank department. When the company sought to hire workers in its machine shop, it asked to hire the "new men" rather than transfer "old men" from other departments (which were shutting down). The union argued old men should be hired in the machine shop before any "new men." The union and company met repeatedly over the issue, but nothing was resolved. The company closed its plant in August 1935. When it reopened in September, it offered employment to several "old men" at much lower wage rates. The union refused the offer. The plant reopened, and the union began picketing.

The National Labor Relations Board held that Sands Manufacturing had refused to bargain with union, had discriminated against union members in hiring, and had discouraged membership in the union. Sands Manufacturing sued to have the Board's order overturned. A court of appeals agreed with the employer.

== Judgment ==
=== Majority ruling ===
Associate Justice Owen Roberts wrote the decision for the majority, joined by Chief Justice Charles Evans Hughes and Associate Justices James Clark McReynolds, Pierce Butler, and Harlan F. Stone.

Roberts held that the NLRB's decision was not supported by the evidence before the Board. Although the Board had alleged that the evidence supported only one conclusion, this allegation was also not supported by the evidence. The majority concluded that since no negotiations were pending and no new meetings were scheduled, there was no "negotiating" going on and hence the employer's plant shut-down did not violate the NLRA. Furthermore, since the employer had offered to hire some men back, clearly there had been no refusal to bargain. The employer's decision to rehire some of the "old men" by contracting with them individually was also not a violation of the Act.

=== Dissent ===
Associate Justice Hugo Black dissented, joined by Associate Justice Stanley Forman Reed. No dissenting opinion was filed.

== Significance ==
The case was one of the first clear-cut defeats for the NLRB before the Supreme Court, after an unprecedented string of 15 successes. The decision placed significant limitations on the ability of unions to engage in collective action. The Sands Court also upheld the right of an employer to violate the NLRA so long as the union had already acted illegally. The Court rejected the union's good faith effort to interpret its contract, which led to the strike. Only the Court's interpretation of the contract mattered, the majority concluded, and strikes over differences of interpretation of the contract were no longer protected activity. The "employer's overriding right to unimpeded access to labor was held to justify its unilateral action to resolve an impasse in its favor."

Along with NLRB v. Fansteel Metallurgical Corp., 306 U.S. 240 (1939) and NLRB v. Columbian Enameling & Stamping Co., 306 U.S. 292 (1939), the decision has been called one of the three most significant NLRB cases since NLRB v. Jones & Laughlin Steel Corp., 301 U.S. 1 (1938) upheld the NLRA's constitutionality. The three cases also expanded the way the Court interpreted the NLRA. Although the justices had previously interpreted the Act solely through the lens of the Commerce Clause (showing strong deference to the Board), now the Court evinced a willingness to apply evidentiary standards to the Board's actions and to impose a less radical interpretation on the law.

== See also ==
- US labor law
