= NLRB v. Fansteel Metallurgical Corp. =

1939 U.S. Supreme Court case on labor law

- Supreme Court of the United States

Argued January 12–13, 1939 Decided February 27, 1939
- Full case name: National Labor Relations Board v. Fansteel Metallurgical Corporation
- Citations: 306 U.S. 240 (more) 59 S. Ct. 490; 83 L. Ed. 627; 1939 U.S. LEXIS 1092; 1 Lab. Cas. (CCH) ¶ 17,042; 123 A.L.R. 599; 4 L.R.R.M. 515

Case history
- Prior: Fansteel Metallurgical Corp. v. NLRB, 98 F.2d 375 (7th Cir. 1938); cert. granted, 305 U.S. 590 (1938).

Holding
- National Labor Relations Act does not confer authority to order an employer to reinstate workers fired after illegal activity, even if the employer's own illegal actions triggered that activity.

Court membership
- Chief Justice Charles E. Hughes Associate Justices James C. McReynolds · Pierce Butler; Harlan F. Stone · Owen Roberts; Hugo Black · Stanley F. Reed; Felix Frankfurter

Case opinions
- Majority: Hughes, joined by McReynolds, Butler, Roberts
- Concurrence: Stone
- Dissent: Reed, joined by Black
- Frankfurter took no part in the consideration or decision of the case.

Laws applied
- National Labor Relations Act

National Labor Relations Board v. Fansteel Metallurgical Corporation, 306 U.S. 240 (1939), is a United States Supreme Court case on labor laws in which the Court held that the National Labor Relations Board had no authority to order an employer to reinstate workers fired after a sit-down strike, even if the employer's illegal actions triggered that strike.

== Background ==
=== Facts ===
In the summer of 1936, workers at Fansteel Metallurgical Corporation's plant near Chicago, Illinois, attempted to form a union. Fansteel infiltrated a labor spy into the union, who committed espionage against the union. Although the union attempted to meet several times with the plant superintendent to negotiate a contract, each time the employer refused. The employer established a company union in an attempt to weaken support for the independent union, but this failed. On February 17, 1937, the frustrated union announced a sit-down strike and seized a portion of the plant. The employer won an injunction ordering the union men to vacate the premises, which they ignored. An attempt by sheriff's deputies to eject the men on February 19 failed, but a second attempt on February 26 was successful. The National Labor Relations Board (NLRB) held on March 14, 1938, that Fansteel had to reinstate 90 of the workers because the company had violated the Act first (precipitating the sit-down strike).

=== Sit-down strikes ===
Sit-down strikes were prominent in the American zeitgeist in the mid-1930s. Around the same time as the Fansteel strike, from the 1936 to 1937, there was a similar strike at a General Motors plant in Flint, Michigan that received wall-to-wall news coverage across the country. The sit-down strikes initially had popular support, and they were markedly successful both at improving workers' conditions and increasing union enrollment.

However, by the time of the Fansteel decision, things had changed. Corporate media campaigns had consistently excoriated these protests for years. People either came to agree with that messaging or grew tired of the consistent disruptions caused by the sit-downs.

== Judgment ==
Chief Justice Charles Evans Hughes wrote the decision for the majority, joined by Associate Justices James Clark McReynolds, Pierce Butler, and Owen Roberts. Hughes held that a sit-down strike was "good cause" for discharging the workers, and that the National Labor Relations Act did not give the NLRB the authority to force an employer to rehire workers who had violated the law. The majority also held that the NLRB could not order an employer to bargain with the union in the absence of evidence that the union has the support of a majority of the workers, even though the employer has engaged in illegal activity which may have undermined that pro-union support.

Associate Justice Harlan F. Stone concurred in part. Stone agreed that the sit-down strikers had been lawfully fired and lost the protection of the NLRA. He disagreed, however, that the workers who abetted the sit-down strikers had lost the protection of the Act (as the majority had concluded), and felt the Board had the power to order their reinstatement.

Associated Justice Stanley Forman Reed dissented, joined by Justice Hugo Black. Reed argued that the majority had recognized that the sit-down strikers could be punished for their lawless acts, but that the majority refused to punish the employer for engaging in lawless acts which led to an unfair labor practice strike. Congress, Reed said, had given the Board the power to return to the status quo ante, and all workers should be reinstated.

== Significance ==
Many commentators believe Fansteel outlawed the sit-down strike. It did not; rather, the court held that the NLRB had no authority to force an employer to reinstate workers who engaged in a sit-down strike. The majority opinion declared that the strike was already illegal: "Nor is it questioned that the seizure and retention of respondent's property were unlawful. It was a high-handed proceeding without shadow of legal right." Historian Sidney Fine contends that this finding "definitively resolved" the legality of the sit-down strike.

The Fansteel Court initially limited discharge to those employees who had violated the law during a strike, but the Supreme Court held in Southern Steamship Co. v. National Labor Relations Board, 316 U.S. 31 (1942), that an employer could discharge an employee for any violation of federal law, whether it occurred during a strike or not. And in NLRB v. Sands Manufacturing Co., 306 U.S. 332 (1939), the Court held that an employer could discipline a striking employee for acts committed away from the job site. The Supreme Court would eventually hold collective work slow-downs, collective refusal to work overtime, and "quickie" strikes equally unlawful.

Along with NLRB v. Columbian Enameling & Stamping Co., 306 U.S. 292 (1939) and NLRB v. Sands Manufacturing Co., the decision has been called one of the three most significant NLRB cases since National Labor Relations Board v. Jones & Laughlin Steel Corporation, 301 U.S. 1 (1938) upheld the NLRA's constitutionality. The three cases also expanded the way the Court interpreted the NLRA. Although the justices had previously interpreted the Act solely through the lens of the Commerce Clause (showing strong deference to the Board), now the Court evinced a willingness to apply evidentiary standards to the Board's actions and to impose a less radical interpretation on the law.
