= NLRB v. Columbian Enameling & Stamping Co. =

National Labor Relations Board v. Columbian Enameling & Stamping Co.
- Supreme Court of the United States

Argued January 11–12, 1939 Decided February 27, 1939
- Full case name: National Labor Relations Board v. Columbian Enameling & Stamping Co.
- Citations: 306 U.S. 292 (more) 59 S. Ct. 501; 83 L. Ed. 660; 1939 U.S. LEXIS 1093

Case history
- Prior: 96 F.2d 948 (7th Cir. 1938); cert. granted, 305 U.S. 583 (1938).

Holding
- Decisions of the NLRB must be based on substantial evidence; third-party requests for collective bargaining do not constitute a request for bargaining under the NLRA.

Court membership
- Chief Justice Charles E. Hughes Associate Justices James C. McReynolds · Pierce Butler; Harlan F. Stone · Owen Roberts; Hugo Black · Stanley F. Reed; Felix Frankfurter

Case opinions
- Majority: Stone, joined by Hughes, McReynolds, Butler, Roberts
- Dissent: Black, joined by Reed
- Frankfurter took no part in the consideration or decision of the case.

Laws applied
- National Labor Relations Act

NLRB v. Columbian Enameling & Stamping Co., 306 U.S. 292 (1939), is a US labor law case where the US Supreme Court held 5-to-2 that the National Labor Relations Act required decisions of the National Labor Relations Board (Board) to be based on substantial evidence. The Supreme Court overturned a ruling of the Board (requiring an employer to rehire striking workers) for not being based on substantial evidence. The Court also held that only the representative of the workers (the union) could issue collective bargaining proposals under the law, and that proposals transmitted by a third party did not trigger the Act's protections or duties.

== Facts ==
Columbian Enameling & Stamping Co. manufactured metal utensils in Terre Haute, Indiana. It recognized a labor union of its employees and signed a one-year collective bargaining agreement on July 14, 1934, which provided for arbitration of disputes and barred work stoppages (pending arbitration). Over the next seven months, the company and union met repeatedly to discuss and negotiate over the union's demands, which included a closed shop and the dismissal of all workers the union had suspended for non-payment of dues. The union struck on March 23, 1935, and the strike turned into a lockout on March 30. The plant reopened with strikebreakers on July 23, 1935. During the strike, the National Labor Relations Act (NLRA) became law. The Board attempted to mediate an end to the strike in July and August, but to no avail. The union submitted proposals to the employer in September and October, but received no reply.

On February 14, 1936, the NLRB held Columbian Enameling & Stamping in violation of the NLRA for refusing to bargain in good faith with its workers, and ordered all strikebreakers fired and all former employees rehired. The company sued in federal court to have the order overturned.

== Judgment ==
Associate Justice Harlan F. Stone wrote the decision for the majority, joined by Chief Justice Charles Evans Hughes and Associate Justices James Clark McReynolds, Pierce Butler, and Owen Roberts.

Stone concluded that the NLRB's decision was not supported by the evidence. The NLRB agents' proposals to the employer did not constitute a request for bargaining under the NLRA, and so the employer's refusal to respond to them was not a violation of the law. The NLRB's conclusions, Stone said, were not based on "substantial" evidence. The majority defined substantial evidence as evidence which "must do more than create a suspicion of the existence of the fact to be established. It is such relevant evidence as a reasonable mind might accept as adequate to support a conclusion, and it must be enough to justify, if the trial were to a jury, a refusal to direct a verdict when the conclusion sought to be drawn from it is one of fact for the jury.

Associate Justice Hugo Black dissented, joined by Associate Justice Stanley Forman Reed. Black concluded that the majority had substituted its own appraisal of the evidence for that of the Board's, which was inappropriate. He also concluded that the majority disregarded the evidence that the mediators were negotiating with the employer on behalf of the union:

To conclude that the company—through its president—was unaware the conciliators were acting at the instance of the Union, and therefore is not to be held responsible for its flat refusal to meet with its employees, is both to ignore the record and to shut our eyes to the realities of the conditions of modern industry and industrial strife.

Black also noted that no arbitration was pending, and so the union was not in violation of its contract.

== Significance ==
Initially, the Supreme Court had adopted the "mere scintilla" rule. As defined in Interstate Commerce Commission v. Union Pacific Railroad, 222 U.S. 541 (1912), the Court originally required administrative agencies to provide "more than a scintilla" of evidence. But by the late 1930s, the Court had shifted to the "substantial evidence rule." NLRB v. Columbian Enameling & Stamping Co. is the first significant, lengthy statement of this rule. But the "substantial evidence" test has been criticized as being "largely an exercise in semantics, i.e., an analysis of the words used in writing opinions and not of the extent in which reviewing courts inquired into the facts."

The case was one of the first clear-cut defeats for the Board before the Supreme Court, after an unprecedented string of 15 successes. Along with NLRB v. Fansteel Metallurgical Corp., 306 U.S. 240 (1939) and NLRB v. Sands Manufacturing Co., 306 U.S. 332 (1939), the decision has been called one of the three most significant NLRB cases since NLRB v. Jones & Laughlin Steel Corporation, 301 U.S. 1 (1938) upheld the NLRA's constitutionality. The three cases also expanded the way the Court interpreted the NLRA. Although the justices had previously interpreted the Act solely through the lens of the Commerce Clause (showing strong deference to the Board), now the Court evinced a willingness to apply evidentiary standards to the Board's actions and to impose a less radical interpretation on the law.

== See also ==
- US labor law
