= Section 120 of the Constitution of Australia =

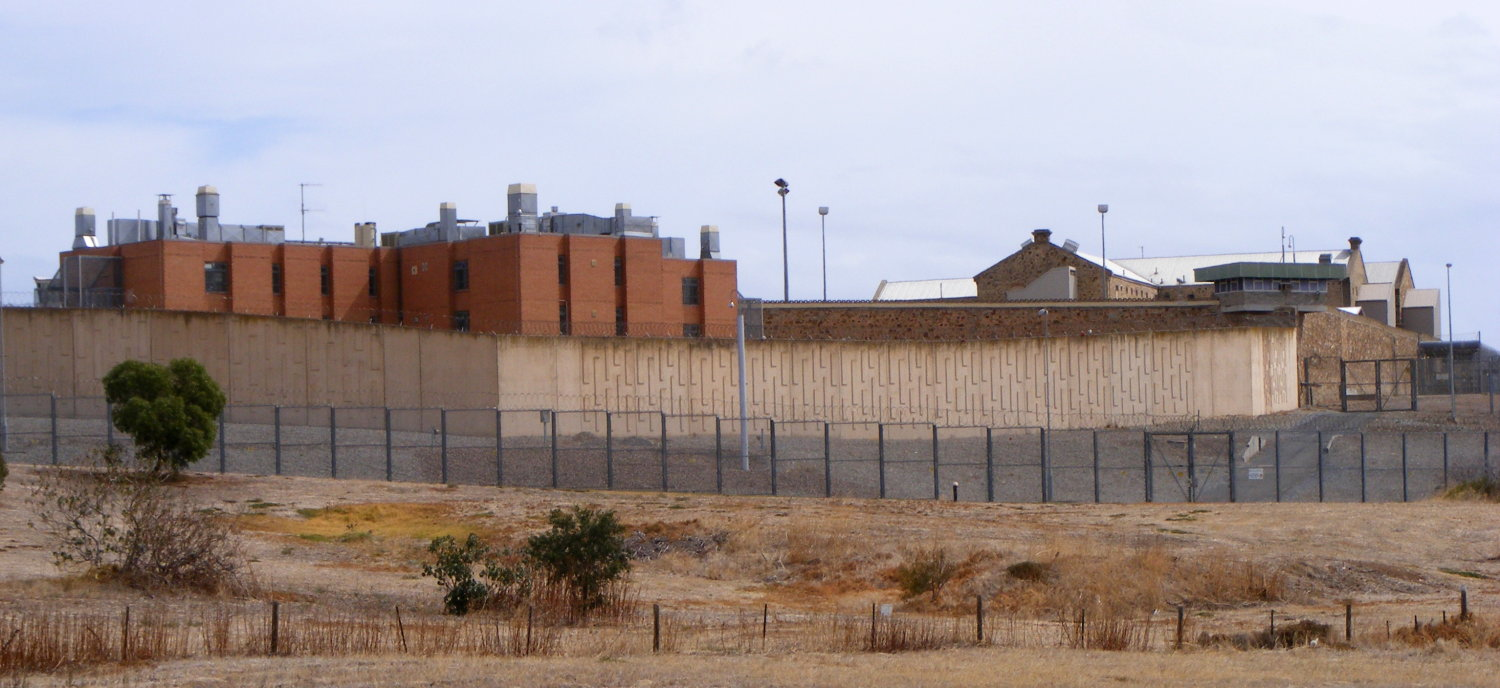
Yatala Labour Prison, South Australia

Section 120 of the Constitution of Australia provides that

Custody of offenders against laws of the Commonwealth

Every State shall make provision for the detention in its prisons of persons accused or convicted of offences against the laws of the Commonwealth, and for the punishment of persons convicted of such offences, and the Parliament of the Commonwealth may make laws to give effect to this provision.

== Application ==
=== The possibility of federal prisons ===
The system of using State prisons to hold federal prisoners differs from that of other federations such as the United States, which has separate prisons for State prisoners and federal prisoners. Section 120 does not prevent the establishment of a federal prison system in Australia; it merely gives the Commonwealth the option of using State prisons instead should it wish to do so.

Indeed, the Australian Law Reform Commission (ALRC) has on several occasions given consideration to the creation of a separate federal prison system but on each occasion has declined to recommend it, citing existing infrastructure, geographic dispersal and the relatively low number of federal offenders among its reasons for believing such a system to be inviable. In June 2004, it was found that federal prisoners only made up between 4 and 5 percent of Australia's prison population (approximately 700 people).

=== Funding ===
The States must bear the cost of detaining and punishing federal prisoners, although this burden is lessened by grants from the Commonwealth.

=== Differential treatment of federal prisoners ===
In Leeth v Commonwealth, the High Court found that there was no requirement that prison conditions of federal prisoners be uniform across the Commonwealth.

It is unclear whether or not the Commonwealth may make rules as to the treatment of its prisoners held in State prisons, or if it is bound to accept the State prisons as they are. At present, however, the Commonwealth has not created any such rules and federal prisoners are treated the same way as the State prisoners in their prison.

Opinions are divided as to whether it would be desirable for the Commonwealth to create rules that specifically relate to federal prisoners, but there is a general acceptance that creating two classes of prisoners within a single prison could cause practical difficulties. Then Solicitor-General of Australia Justin Gleeson wrote that "at a practical level, it is hard to conceive how a state can sensibly run its prisons by according differential standards of treatment to prisoners depending upon whether the original crime was committed under federal or state law," while Professor Matthew Groves of Monash University wrote that the present arrangement was preferable to avoid the "potential resentment and confusion in management that would be generated by enforcing two different regimes within one prison for similar classes of prisoners".
