= Full Faith and Credit Clause =

Clause of the United States constitution

Article IV, Section 1 of the United States Constitution, the Full Faith and Credit Clause, addresses the duty that states within the United States have to respect the "public acts, records, and judicial proceedings of every other state". According to the Supreme Court, there is a difference between the credit owed to laws (i.e. legislative measures and common law) as compared to the credit owed to judgments. Judges and lawyers agree on the meaning of the clause with respect to the recognition of judgments rendered by one state in the courts of another. Barring exceptional circumstances, one state must enforce a judgment by a court in another, unless that court lacked jurisdiction, even if the enforcing court otherwise disagrees with the result. At present, it is widely agreed that this clause of the Constitution has a minimal impact on a court's choice of law decision provided that no state's sovereignty is infringed, although this clause of the Constitution was once interpreted to have greater impact.

== Text ==
Article IV, Section 1:

Full Faith and Credit shall be given in each State to the public Acts, Records, and judicial Proceedings of every other State. And the Congress may by general Laws prescribe the Manner in which such Acts, Records and Proceedings shall be proved, and the Effect thereof.

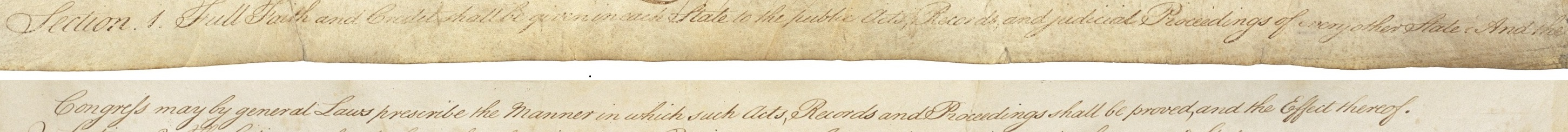
The Full Faith and Credit Clause as it appears in the final draft of the Constitution of the United States, written in 1787

== Background ==
A similar clause existed in Article IV of the Articles of Confederation, the predecessor to the U.S. Constitution: "Full faith and credit shall be given in each of these States to the records, acts, and judicial proceedings of the courts and magistrates of every other State." In 1781, a committee of the Continental Congress reported that execution of that clause in the Articles of Confederation required a declaration of two different things: "[1] the method of exemplifying records and [2] the operation of the Acts and judicial proceedings of the Courts of one State contravening those of the States in which they are asserted."

A Pennsylvania court stated in 1786, that this provision in the Articles of Confederation did not direct that "executions might issue in one state upon the judgments given in another", but rather was "chiefly intended to oblige each state to receive the records of another as full evidence of such acts and judicial proceedings."

At the 1787 Constitutional Convention, James Madison said that he wanted to supplement that provision in the Articles of Confederation, to let Congress "provide for the execution of Judgments in other States, under such regulations as might be expedient." By September 1, 1787, negotiations at the Constitutional Convention had led to the following draft which included supplementary language as Madison had requested, similar to what the committee of the Continental Congress had reported in 1781:

Full faith and credit ought to be given in each state to the public acts, records, and judicial proceedings, of every other state; and the legislature shall, by general laws, prescribe the manner in which such acts, records, and proceedings, shall be proved, and the effect which judgments, obtained in one state, shall have in another.

After several further modifications, the Full Faith and Credit Clause assumed the form in which it remains today. James Wilson said during the constitutional convention that, if Congress were to not use its power under the latter part of this clause, then the former part of this clause "would amount to nothing more than what now takes place among all Independent Nations". Later, during the ratification process, James Madison remarked further on this subject, in Federalist No. 42. He wrote that the corresponding clause in the Articles of Confederation was "extremely indeterminate, and can be of little importance under any interpretation which it will bear". Of the expanded clause in the Constitution, Madison wrote that it established a power that "may be rendered a very convenient instrument of justice, and be particularly beneficial on the borders of contiguous States."

== Interpretation ==
In 1790, shortly after the Constitution had been ratified, Congress took action under the Full Faith and Credit Clause, enacting that "the records and judicial proceedings, authenticated as aforesaid, shall have such faith and credit given to them in every Court within the United States, as they have by law or usage in the Courts of the state from whence the said records are or shall be taken." In 1813, the Supreme Court interpreted this federal statute, in the leading case of Mills v. Duryee, where the judgment of a New York court was used in a local District of Columbia court. Justice Joseph Story wrote for the Court that it was the federal statute (rather than the constitutional provision) that made records from one state effective in another state:

It is argued, that this act provides only for the admission of such records as evidence, but does not declare the effect of such evidence, when admitted. This argument cannot be supported. The act declares, that the record, duly authenticated, shall have such faith and credit as it has in the state court from whence it is taken. If in such court it has the faith and credit of evidence of the highest nature, viz., record evidence, it must have the same faith and credit in every other court.

Although the Court was engaged in statutory interpretation in Mills, the Court eventually characterized Mills as a constitutional decision, in the 1887 case of Chicago & Alton v. Wiggins. During the following decades and centuries, the Supreme Court has recognized a "public policy exception" to both the Full Faith and Credit Clause and the accompanying federal statute. In 1939, the Court in Pacific Employers Insurance v. Industrial Accident wrote:

[T]here are some limitations upon the extent to which a state may be required by the full faith and credit clause to enforce even the judgment of another state in contravention of its own statutes or policy. See Wisconsin v. Pelican Insurance Co., 127 U.S. 265; Huntington v. Attrill, 146 U.S. 657; Finney v. Guy, 189 U.S. 335; see also Clarke v. Clarke, 178 U.S. 186; Olmsted v. Olmsted, 216 U.S. 386; Hood v. McGehee, 237 U.S. 611; cf. Gasquet v. Fenner, 247 U.S. 16. And in the case of statutes...the full faith and credit clause does not require one state to substitute for its own statute, applicable to persons and events within it, the conflicting statute of another state, even though that statute is of controlling force in the courts of the state of its enactment with respect to the same persons and events.

The Supreme Court continues to apply its public policy exception differently for state judgments as compared to state laws. In the 2003 case of Franchise Tax Board v. Hyatt, the Court reiterated that, "[o]ur precedent differentiates the credit owed to laws (legislative measures and common law) and to judgments."

If the legal pronouncements of one state conflict with the public policy of another state, federal courts in the past have been reluctant to force a state to enforce the pronouncements of another state in contravention of its own public policy. In cases of out-of-state judgments, the Court has stated that there may be exceptions to the enforcement and jurisdiction of out-of-state judgments, but maintains that there is no public policy exception to the Full Faith and Credit Clause for judgments.

Federal statutory law (28 USC § 1738) provides that:

Such Acts, records and judicial proceedings or copies thereof, so authenticated, shall have the same full faith and credit in every court within the United States and its Territories and Possessions as they have by law or usage in the courts of such State, Territory or Possession from which they are taken.

== Application to family law ==
The Full Faith and Credit Clause has been applied to orders of protection, for which the clause was invoked by the Violence Against Women Act, and child support, for which the enforcement of the clause was spelled out in the Federal Full Faith and Credit for Child Support Orders Act (28 U.S.C. § 1738B).

Until the Supreme Court struck down all laws banning interracial marriage in 1967, a number of states banned interracial marriage and did not recognize marriage certificates issued in other states for interracial couples. The full faith and credit clause was never used to force a state to recognize a marriage it did not wish to recognize. However, the existence of a common-law marriage in a sister state (still available in nine states and the District of Columbia) has been recognized in divorce or dissolution of marriage cases.

The clause's application to state-sanctioned same-sex marriages, civil unions, and domestic partnerships is unresolved, although the case of marriage has been rendered moot. In 1996 the U.S. Congress enacted the Defense of Marriage Act (DOMA), a statute defining marriage as being between one man and one woman for federal purposes and allowed states to refuse to recognize same-sex marriages performed in other states. Whether the latter provision of DOMA violated the Full Faith and Credit Clause was debated among legal commentators. Some scholars viewed DOMA as a violation of the Full Faith and Credit Clause. Other legal scholars disagreed. Ultimately, the U.S. Supreme Court in United States v. Windsor struck down DOMA as a violation of the Constitution's Equal Protection Clause and did not address the Full Faith and Credit Clause in its decision.

In March 2016, the Supreme Court ruled in V.L. v. E.L. that under the Full Faith and Credit Clause, the State of Alabama must recognize the adoption decree granted to a same-sex couple by a Georgia state court in 2007, regardless of how that court came to its conclusion granting the decree.

The Respect for Marriage Act repealed the Defense of Marriage Act (DOMA) and required the U.S. federal government to recognize the validity of same-sex and interracial marriages in the United States, and to protect religious liberty. Its author, Senator Tammy Baldwin, has stated that its constitutional authority stems from the Full Faith and Credit Clause.

== Global influence ==
The wording of this clause was closely followed by the framers of the Constitution of Australia from 1901, (Note: Proclaimed by Queen Victoria of the United Kingdom in 1900. See Constitution of Australia for more details.) namely, in Section 118 of the Constitution of Australia.
