= Protecting the Right to Organize Act =

Proposed United States federal labor law

Richard L. Trumka Protecting the Right to Organize Act
- Long title: To amend the National Labor Relations Act, the Labor Management Relations Act, 1947, and the Labor-Management Reporting and Disclosure Act of 1959, and for other purposes.
- Announced in: the 119th United States Congress
- Number of co-sponsors: 214

Legislative history
- Introduced in the House of Representatives as H.R. 20 by Bobby Scott (D–VA) on March 5, 2025; Committee consideration by House Education and Labor

The Richard L. Trumka Protecting the Right to Organize Act (PRO Act) is a proposed United States law that would amend previous labor laws such as the National Labor Relations Act for the purpose of expanding "various labor protections related to employees' rights to organize and collectively bargain in the workplace." The measure would prevent employers from holding mandatory meetings for the purpose of counteracting labor organization and would strengthen the legal right of employees to join a labor union. The bill would also permit labor unions to encourage secondary strikes. The PRO Act would weaken right-to-work laws, which exist in 27 U.S. states. It would allow the National Labor Relations Board to fine employers for violations of labor law, and would provide compensation to employees involved in such cases. It is named after Richard Trumka, who was elected president of the AFL-CIO on September 16, 2009, and served in that office until his death on August 5, 2021.

== Background ==
The Protecting the Right to Organize Act, also known as the PRO Act, follows a series of past legislation passed by Congress concerning labor rights. A number of landmark bills were passed during the New Deal period, including the Fair Labor Standards Act of 1938, which President Franklin D. Roosevelt considered one of the most important Acts of Congress at the time.

Following the New Deal, a number of bills were passed which restricted the activities of labor unions. Among these was the Labor Management Relations Act of 1947 (commonly known as the Taft-Hartley Act), which among other things prohibited secondary boycotts and closed shops.

In 2009, the Employee Free Choice Act, another bill which would have amended the National Labor Relations Act, failed to pass.

In the State of California, following the passage of California Assembly Bill 5, Proposition 22 was passed in 2020. Proposition 22 was intended to classify so-called gig workers for app-based companies (such as Lyft, Uber, DoorDash and Postmates) as "independent contractors" rather than full employees.

== Content ==
The PRO Act would amend the National Labor Relations Act of 1935 (also known as the Wagner Act), the Taft-Hartley Act, and the Labor-Management Reporting and Disclosure Act of 1959 (also known as the Landrum–Griffin Act).

According to the summary text of the PRO Act, it revises definitions under labor law, permits labor unions to encourage participation in secondary strikes, and prohibits employers from litigating against unions which conduct such secondary strikes:

Among other things, it (1) revises the definitions of employee, supervisor, and employer to broaden the scope of individuals covered by the fair labor standards; (2) permits labor organizations to encourage participation of union members in strikes initiated by employees represented by a different labor organization (i.e., secondary strikes); and (3) prohibits employers from bringing claims against unions that conduct such secondary strikes.

The PRO Act would prevent employees seeking to join a labor union from being fired. It would allow unions to override right-to-work laws, allowing labor unions to collect dues from all employees in a workplace, regardless of whether or not they are a member of a labor union. Right-to-work laws exist in 27 U.S. states, and the PRO Act would weaken these laws. It would also prohibit company-sponsored captive audience meetings used to counteract and discourage attempts at labor organization as an unfair labor practice. It prevents an employer from holding citizenship status against an employee. The bill would allow the National Labor Relations Board to fine employers up to $50,000 for every violation of labor law. It would also allow the NLRB to fine employers up to $100,000 in the case of repeat offenses by an employer. It would bring monetary compensation to employees involved in such cases. The PRO Act would classify some workers who are classified now as "independent contractors", instead as "employees". The bill would amend the National Labor Relations Act to define an employee as follows:

An individual performing any service shall be considered an employee (except as provided in the previous sentence) and not an independent contractor, unless—
(A) the individual is free from control and direction in connection with the performance of the service, both under the contract for the performance of service and in fact;
(B) the service is performed outside the usual course of the business of the employer; and
(C) the individual is customarily engaged in an independently established trade, occupation, profession, or business of the same nature as that involved in the service performed."

This definitional amendment would allow for certain workers, such as those working in the gig economy, to attain the right to form a labor union or to bargain collectively. This would potentially include those who work for app-based companies such as Uber, DoorDash, or Lyft, and overall could include hundreds of thousands or millions of workers. However, this reclassification applies only to collective bargaining. For other considerations, such as wages or benefits, they would still be treated as independent contractors. The PRO Act would alter union election rules. For example, it would allow unions to hold elections through mail ballots or electronic ballots. The bill would allow for workers to sue employers, and would make it easier for employees to join a union.

== Support and opposition ==
=== Polling ===
A poll conducted by Vox and Data for Progress in June 2021 said that 59% of likely U.S. voters supported the PRO Act, and 29% opposed it.

=== Support ===
A letter signed by over 100 labor unions, advocacy organizations, churches, and political groups supported the PRO Act. This included but was not limited to the AFL-CIO, EPI, Public Citizen, AFT, Sunrise Movement, CPD, DSA, SEIU, PFAW, CWA, FSP, FoEI, HRW, USW, IWPR, GBCS, IFPTE, NETWORK, Patriotic Millionaires, and Oxfam. Ryan Kekeris, an organizer with the International Union of Painters and Allied Trades, said the PRO Act "modernizes and updates a lot of the loopholes and the brokenness of U.S. labor law". Richard Trumka of the AFL-CIO said, "If you really want to correct inequality in this country ... passing the PRO Act is absolutely essential to doing that." The bill has received backing from the Labor Caucus and The Leadership Conference on Civil and Human Rights. Joe Biden endorsed the PRO Act, and has called labor law reform one of the top priorities of his administration.

=== Opposition ===
At least 150 business groups oppose the PRO Act. Those who oppose it, including Republicans, business groups, and industry groups, have variously claimed that the PRO Act would hurt business and workers, violate privacy rights, give unions too much bargaining power, enable corruption, and would disrespect states' rights. The U.S. Chamber of Commerce, the nation's largest business association lobby group, opposes the PRO Act. Among other opposed organizations are the National Retail Federation, National Association of Manufacturers, National Restaurant Association, American Hotel & Lodging Association, National Federation of Independent Business, and the National Association of Home Builders.

== Legislative activity ==
=== 116th Congress ===
On May 2, 2019, Rep. Bobby Scott (D-VA) introduced H.R. 2474, the Protecting the Right to Organize Act of 2019, in the House of Representatives. It had 218 cosponsors. The bill passed in the House of Representatives by a vote of 224 to 194 on May 6, 2020. Seven House Democrats voted against the bill.

On May 2, 2019, Sen. Patty Murray (D-WA) introduced S.1306, the Protecting the Right to Organize Act of 2019, in the Senate. It was referred to the Committee on Health, Education, Labor, and Pensions. The bill had 41 cosponsors.

=== 117th Congress ===
On February 4, 2021, Rep. Bobby Scott (D-VA-03) introduced the Protecting the Right to Organize Act of 2021 in the House of Representatives. Of the bill's 213 cosponsors, 3 were Republicans: Brian Fitzpatrick (PA-01), Jeff Van Drew (NJ-02), and Chris Smith (NJ-04). The other 210 were Democrats.

The bill passed in the House of Representatives by a vote of 225 to 206 on March 9, 2021. Five House Republicans – Fitzpatrick, Smith, Van Drew, John Katko (NY-24), and Don Young (AK-AL) joined the House Democrats in voting for it, while one Democrat, Henry Cuellar (TX-28), voted against it. The bill advanced to the U.S. Senate; however, the bill did not pass as it would have required universal Democratic support and 10 Republican crossover votes to pass in case of a filibuster.

=== 118th Congress ===
On February 28, 2023, Rep. Bobby Scott (D-VA-03) introduced the Richard L. Trumka Protecting the Right to Organize Act of 2023 in the House of Representatives.

== Legislative history ==
As of October 11, 2026:

Congress	Short title	Bill number(s)	Date introduced	Sponsor(s)	# of cosponsors	Latest status
116th Congress	Protecting the Right to Organize Act of 2019	H.R. 2474	May 2, 2019	Robert C. Scott (D-VA)	218	Passed in the House (224–194).
116th Congress	Protecting the Right to Organize Act of 2019	S.1306	May 5, 2019	Patty Murray (D-WA)	41	Died in committee.
117th Congress	Protecting the Right to Organize Act of 2021	H.R.824	February 4, 2021	Robert C. Scott (D-VA)	213	Passed in the House (225–206).
117th Congress	Protecting the Right to Organize Act of 2021	S.420	February 24, 2021	Patty Murray (D-WA)	46	Died in committee.
118th Congress	Richard L. Trumka Protecting the Right to Organize Act of 2023	H.R. 20	February 28, 2023	Robert C. Scott (D-VA)	219	Died in committee.
118th Congress	Richard L. Trumka Protecting the Right to Organize Act of 2023	S.567	February 28, 2023	Bernie Sanders (I-VT)	48	Passed Committee. Reported without amendment favorably and placed on the calendar.
119th Congress	Richard L. Trumka Protecting the Right to Organize Act of 2025	H.R. 20	March 5, 2025	Robert C. Scott (D-VA)	217	Referred to Committees of Jurisdiction
119th Congress	Richard L. Trumka Protecting the Right to Organize Act of 2025	S.852	March 5, 2025	Bernie Sanders (I-VT)	45	Referred to Committees of Jurisdiction

== See also ==
- Accountable Capitalism Act
- Adamson Act
- Employee Free Choice Act
- Fair Labor Standards Act of 1938
- Faster Labor Contracts Act
- Labor unions in the United States
- Paycheck Fairness Act
- Reward Work Act
- Workplace Democracy Act
