= FSP =

FSP may refer to:

== Government ==
- Florence State Prison, in Arizona, United States
- Florida State Prison, in the United States
- Folsom State Prison, in California, United States
- Food Stamp Program, a program of the United States Department of Agriculture
- Foreign Service of Pakistan
- Freeway service patrol, in the United States

== Medicine ==
- Familial spastic paraparesis
- Fibrin split products

== Politics ==
- Foro de São Paulo, a Latin American political assembly
- Freedom Socialist Party, a political party in the United States
- Freelance Solidarity Project, a US media-worker union division
- Free Socialist Party/Marxist-Leninists, a defunct political party in West Germany
- Free State Project, an American political migration
- Frontline Socialist Party, a political party in Sri Lanka

== Technology ==
- Fibre saturation point
- Fission Surface Power, a lunar colonization research project
- Friction stir processing
- FSP Group, a Taiwanese electronics manufacturer
- Firmware Support Package, a firmware initialisation and management infrastructure by Intel
- File Service Protocol

== Transport ==
- Fateh Singhpura railway station, in Rajasthan, India
- Frankfurt Stadion station, in Germany
- Nikolai Airport, in Alaska, United States
- Saint-Pierre Pointe-Blanche Airport, in Saint-Pierre and Miquelon, France
- Shenton Park railway station, in Western Australia

== Other uses ==
- Daughters of St. Paul (Latin: Filiarum Sancti Pauli), a Catholic religious congregation
- Factory Specification Parts
- Falguni Shane Peacock, an Indian fashion house
- Folha de S.Paulo, a Brazilian newspaper
- Food Service Provider
- Food self-provisioning
- French Saddle Pony
- Functional sentence perspective
- Full Scope Poly (List of U.S. security clearance terms)
