= Jeff Weinstein =

American critic and activist (born 1947)

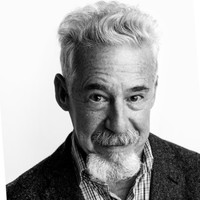
Jeff Weinstein at the Village Voice Reunion on September 9, 2017

Jeff Weinstein (born September 8, 1947) is an American critic, editor, fiction writer and union activist, best known as a former restaurant critic for the Village Voice, where he was also on staff from 1981 to 1995. In 1982, he helped negotiate a Voice union contract that extended health insurance and other benefits, which the newspaper already provided to married couples and, as a matter of practice, to unmarried heterosexual couples, to same-sex couples. The agreement was the second union contract in the United States, the first by a private company, and the first to be widely reported on, to offer same-sex couples these protections.

== Early life and education ==
Weinstein was born and raised in New York City. A type 1 diabetic since age 8, he studied biology at Brandeis University, and did graduate work at the University of California, Riverside and the University of California, San Diego. At UCSD, Weinstein was a member of the Radical Coalition, where he participated in the United Farm Workers lettuce boycott against Safeway. He was also the first out gay student on campus.

== Career ==
Weinstein was hired to write restaurant reviews for the San Diego Reader when he was 25 years old, in 1972. He quit in early 1973, because of articles the Reader published that he considered to be “sexist and racist crap.” While primarily a nonfiction writer, Weinstein also wrote fiction in the mid-1970s and early 1980s, including the short story “A Jean-Marie Cookbook,” which won a 1979-80 Pushcart Prize, and the novella Life in San Diego, which was published by Sun & Moon Press in 1983, with illustrations by the artist Ira Joel Haber.

After he moved back to New York, Weinstein worked as a restaurant critic for the SoHo Weekly News and later joined the Village Voice as both a restaurant critic and as Senior Editor, overseeing pieces about visual art and architecture. As a food critic, Weinstein is known for his uncommon prose style and perspective, his interest in covering a variety of restaurants in their own particular cultural and socioeconomic contexts, and his “roving intellectual appetite.” In 1983, Weinstein helped found the National Writers Union, for which he served as East Coast representative to the Union's executive board.

Weinstein collected his Village Voice restaurant column, “Eating Around,” into a book, Learning to Eat, which Sun & Moon Press published in 1988. During his tenure at the Voice, Weinstein also wrote a column about consumerism, entitled “Consumerismo.”

From 1997 to 2006, he was columnist and fine arts editor for the Philadelphia Inquirer. He subsequently served as arts and culture editor for Bloomberg News, and currently writes the LGBTQIA-related blog “Out There” on ArtsJournal.com.

== Personal life ==
Weinstein was partnered with the writer, critic and artist John Perreault from 1976 until Perreault's death in 2015. The couple married in Provincetown, Massachusetts in 2008. Since 2017, Weinstein has been partnered with the writer and critic Daniel Felsenthal, with whom he lives in New York City and in Bellport, Long Island. They are now married.

== Bibliography ==
- Life in San Diego (Sun & Moon Press, 1983)
- Learning to Eat (Sun & Moon Press 1988)
