= Employees' Pension Security Act =

The Employees’ Pension Security Act of 2009 (HR 4281) (also HR 5754 of 2008, and HR 4055 of 2005) is a proposed Act of Congress that would require all single-employer pension plans to have equal representation of employees and employers on a joint pension trust board.

== Background ==
The Bill specifically enacts provisions that had been found in the previous Act introduced by Bernie Sanders, the Workplace Democracy Act. It was first introduced in 2005 by Peter Visclosky, and reintroduced again in 2008 and 2009.

== Contents ==
The Act would amend the Employee Retirement Income Security Act of 1974 §403(a). The central provision is the following:

(A) The assets of a pension plan which is a single-employer plan shall be held in trust by a joint board of trustees, which shall consist of two or more trustees representing on an equal basis the interests of the employer or employers maintaining the plan and the interests of the participants and their beneficiaries.

== See also ==
- US labor law
- Reward Work Act
- Workplace Democracy Act of 1999, HR 1277, Title III, §301
