= Workplace Democracy Act =

Proposal by Bernie Sanders to modify the labor laws of the United States

The Workplace Democracy Act is a proposed US labor law, that has been sponsored by Bernie Sanders and re-introduced from 1992 to 2018. Among its different forms, it would have removed obstacles to employers making collective agreements, established an impartial National Public Employment Relations Commission to support fair collective bargaining, required that pensions plans are jointly managed by employee and employer representatives, changed the definition of an "employee" to ensure every person who works for other people has labor rights, and repeal all "right to work" laws.

The latest version of the Act in 2018 gathered endorsements from leading lawmakers in the Democratic Party, including Kirsten Gillibrand and Mark Pocan.

== Background ==
Given the long-term decline in collective bargaining and the rise in inequality, a substantial number of employee representatives, Democratic politicians, labor unions, academics, judges and lawyers had been advocating the revision of the National Labor Relations Act of 1935.

On 25 September 1992 Bernie Sanders introduced the Bill to the US House of Representatives with 2 cosponsors. After the Bill failed, Sanders tried again in 1994, with one cosponsor. On a third attempt in 1995 by Sanders, the Bill gathered 19 cosponsors. Still the Bill stalled. It was reintroduced in 1997. On 24 March 1999, it was introduced again and referred to the Subcommittee on Employer-Employee Relations on 30 April 1999. It stalled by 20 December 2000.

A similar set of proposals regarding pension fund management was reintroduced by Representative Peter Visclosky in the Employees’ Pension Security Act of 2009, but this also did not yet progress.

In 2015, a new version of the Workplace Democracy Act was introduced by both Bernie Sanders in the Senate and Mark Pocan in the House, receiving multiple sponsors but not passing as the Republican Party held majorities.

In 2018, an extended version of the 2015 Bill was proposed by Bernie Sanders.

== Contents ==
=== 1999 version ===
SECTION 1. SHORT TITLE AND TABLE OF CONTENTS.

- (a) SHORT TITLE- This Act may be cited as the ‘Workplace Democracy Act of 1999’.
- (b) TABLE OF CONTENTS- The table of contents for this Act is as follows:
- Sec. 1. Short title and table of contents.
- Sec. 2. Declaration of purpose and policy.
- Sec. 3. Application of Act.

TITLE I--GENERAL PROVISIONS REGARDING RIGHTS OF EMPLOYEES AND ENFORCEMENT AUTHORITY OF THE NATIONAL LABOR RELATIONS BOARD

- Sec. 101. Right to first contract.
- Sec. 102. Strikes, boycotts, and hot cargo agreements. "Section 8(b)(4) and subsection (e) of the National Labor Relations Act are repealed."
- Sec. 103. Treatment of guards.
- Sec. 104. Card recognition for collective bargaining units. Amends Section 9 of the NLRA to allow a simple card check for recognizing majority support for a union.
- Sec. 105. Enforcement and authority of National Labor Relations Board.
- Sec. 106. Repealing prohibition authority.

TITLE II—GENERAL PROVISIONS REGARDING RIGHTS OF EMPLOYEES AND ENFORCEMENT AUTHORITY FOR THE NATIONAL LABOR RELATIONS BOARD

- Sec. 201. Definitions.
- Sec. 202. National Public Employment Relations Commission.
- Sec. 203. Rights of employees and employee organizations.
- Sec. 204. Representatives and collective-bargaining units.
- Sec. 205. Impasse in collective bargaining over the terms and conditions of employment and other matters of mutual concern relating thereto.
- Sec. 206. Disputes over the interpretation or application of agreements.
- Sec. 207. Strikes.
- Sec. 208. Impasse procedures for firefighters and public safety officers.
- Sec. 209. Strikes and firefighters and public safety officers.
- Sec. 210. Unlawful acts.
- Sec. 211. Prevention of unlawful acts.
- Sec. 212. Applicability of this Act.
- Sec. 213. Miscellaneous.
- Sec. 214. Effective date.

TITLE III—GENERAL PROVISIONS REGARDING PENSION PLANS

- Sec. 301. Requirements relating to trusteeship of single-employer plans. Amending Section 403(a) of the Employee Retirement Income Security Act of 1974, inserting the following:

‘(2)(A) The assets of a single-employer plan shall be held in trust by a joint board of trustees, which shall consist of 2 or more trustees representing on an equal basis the interests of the employer or employers maintaining the plan and the interests of the participants and their beneficiaries. ‘(B)(i) Except as provided in clause (ii), in any case in which the plan is maintained pursuant to one or more collective bargaining agreements between one or more employee organizations and one or more employers, the trustees representing the interests of the participants and their beneficiaries shall be designated by such employee organizations.

- Sec. 302. Effective date.

== 2018 version ==
The 2018 version of the Bill included provisions on misrepresenting employee status by employers, and repealing right-to-work laws. It left out provisions on pension representation (found in the Employees’ Pension Security Act).

== Legislative history ==
Congress	Short title	Bill number(s)	Date introduced	Sponsor(s)	# of cosponsors	Latest status
102nd Congress	Workplace Democracy Act	H.R. 6041	September 25, 1992	Bernie Sanders (I-VT)	2	Died in committee
103rd Congress	Workplace Democracy Act	H.R. 5126	September 28, 1994	Bernie Sanders (I-VT)	1	Died in committee
104th Congress	Workplace Democracy Act	H.R. 1355	March 29, 1995	Bernie Sanders (I-VT)	19	Died in committee
105th Congress	Workplace Democracy Act	H.R. 2012	June 23, 1997	Bernie Sanders (I-VT)	0	Died in committee
106th Congress	Workplace Democracy Act	H.R. 1277	March 24, 1999	Bernie Sanders (I-VT)	0	Died in committee
114th Congress	Workplace Democracy Act	H.R. 3690	October 6, 2015	Mark Pocan (D-WI)	38	Died in committee
114th Congress	Workplace Democracy Act	S. 2142	October 6, 2015	Bernie Sanders (I-VT)	11	Died in committee
115th Congress	Workplace Democracy Act	H.R. 5728	May 9, 2018	Mark Pocan (D-WI)	61	Died in committee
115th Congress	Workplace Democracy Act	S. 2810	May 9, 2018	Bernie Sanders (I-VT)	16	Died in committee

== See also ==
- US labor law
- Protecting the Right to Organize Act
- Reward Work Act
- Accountable Capitalism Act
- Fair Labor Standards Act of 1938
- Adamson Act
- Paycheck Fairness Act
- Employee Free Choice Act
- Labor unions in the United States
