= Employee Free Choice Act =

US federal bill concerning labor union protections

The Employee Free Choice Act is the name for several legislative bills on US labor law (H.R. 3619, H.R. 1696, H.R. 800, H.R. 1409, H.R. 5000, S. 1925, S. 842, S. 1041, S. 560.) which have been proposed and sometimes introduced into one or both chambers of the U.S. Congress.

The bill's purpose, as taken from the 2009 version, was to:

amend the National Labor Relations Act to establish an efficient system to enable employees to form, join, or assist labor organizations [unions], to provide for mandatory injunctions for unfair labor practices during organizing efforts, and for other purposes.

The act would have, first, allowed a union to be certified as the official union to bargain with an employer if union officials collect signatures of a majority of workers. The bill would have removed the present right of the employer to demand an additional, separate ballot when more than half of employees have already given their signature supporting the union. Second, the bill would have required employers and unions to enter binding arbitration to produce a collective agreement at least 120 days after a union is recognized. Third, the bill would have increased penalties on employers who discriminate against workers for union involvement.

== Outline ==
The Employee Free Choice Act would have amended the National Labor Relations Act in three significant ways. That is:

- section 2 would have eliminated the need for an additional ballot to require an employer recognize a union, if a majority of workers have already signed cards expressing their wish to have a union
- section 3 would have required that an employer begins negotiating with a union with a view to reaching a collective agreement within 90 days, and if not, the two sides will be referred to compulsory mediation, and if mediation fails, binding arbitration
- section 4 increases the penalties on employers who subject workers to detriment for being involved in a union.

=== Section 2, Streamlining union certification ===
Section 2(a) of the bill would have allowed the recognition of a union for the purpose of exclusive collective bargaining with an employer if a majority of employees sign cards stating their wish that the union represents them.

Currently, the NLRA section 9(c) anticipates that after at least 30% of employees state their wish for union representation, a separate secret ballot will be held to confirm that the majority of employees want union representation. This only happens when there is "a question of employee representation", or in other words, the result is contested (for instance, because the employer objects). Undisputed petitions, when all employees and the employer agree, require no further election. However, in practice, the results of the card check usually are not presented to the employer until 50 or 60% of bargaining-unit employees have signed the cards. Moreover, even if every employee has signed cards indicating their preference to be represented by the union, an employer may demand a secret ballot, and refuse to bargain until one is held. The effect of section 2 would have been that if a majority of employees at a workplace have already put their names on cards, there would have been no further requirement to confirm the union can represent them through an additional ballot. It would have meant that an employer could not demand a further secret ballot after a majority of employees had already put their names on cards supporting union representation. The text reads as follows:

(6) Notwithstanding any other provision of this section, whenever a petition shall have been filed by an employee or group of employees or any individual or labor organization acting in their behalf alleging that a majority of employees in a unit appropriate for the purposes of collective bargaining wish to be represented by an individual or labor organization for such purposes, the Board shall investigate the petition. If the Board finds that a majority of the employees in a unit appropriate for bargaining has signed valid authorizations designating the individual or labor organization specified in the petition as their bargaining representative and that no other individual or labor organization is currently certified or recognized as the exclusive representative of any of the employees in the unit, the Board shall not direct an election but shall certify the individual or labor organization as the representative described in subsection (a).

Section 2(a) went on to allow the National Labor Relations Board to draw up more detailed regulations for oversight of the majority recognition procedure.

The process of union decertification would not change under the Employee Free Choice Act, so an employer can voluntarily reject a union when a majority of employees sign decertification cards or otherwise demonstrate that they no longer want to be represented by a union, or when 30 percent of employees sign a petition to hold a secret ballot election and a majority of participants in the election vote to decertify the union.

=== Section 3, Facilitating initial collective bargaining agreements ===
Section 3 of the Bill provided that following a union being certified, the union could require the employer to begin negotiations for a collective agreement within ten days. If the employer and union are unable to reach agreement within 90 days, either side may take the dispute to the Federal Mediation and Conciliation Service, which has provided mediation free of charge since 1947. If the FMCS is unable to bring the parties to agreement after providing mediation services for 30 days the dispute will be referred to arbitration. The results of the arbitration shall be binding on the parties for two years. The union and employer may agree to extend any deadlines or time limits.

A study by John-Paul Ferguson and Thomas Kochan at the MIT Sloan School of Management found that only 56% of unions that win an election ever negotiate their first contract. The AFL–CIO says in a pro-EFCA paper, citing data by Ferguson and Kochan, that this is because "newly formed unions lose their presumption of majority status after one year without reaching a contract. The AFL–CIO asserts that this gives employers the incentive to delay the bargaining process for a year and force the demoralized workers to vote again, often resulting in the union's decertification." They claim that "the Employee Free Choice Act eliminates the incentive for employers to bargain in bad faith" and it "will dramatically reduce the delay, frustration and animosity associated with the current company-dominated system."

=== Section 4, Strengthening enforcement ===
Section 4(a) of the Bill would have made the National Labor Relations Board seek injunctions against employers who discriminate against employees who attempt to organize a union. Specifically, the bill allows for an injunction whenever an allegation is proven that an employer threatened to or did discharge or discriminate against an employee who sought representation by a union. An injunction would also have been available if the employer "engaged in any other unfair labor practice" that would have restrained the rights under NLRA section 7.

Currently, such federal court injunctions are required only for violations by unions. No such remedy exists for unlawful acts committed by employers in violation of workers' rights.

Section 4(b) of the Bill would have increased penalties for employers violating the law. The amount an employer is required to pay when an employee is illegally discharged or discriminated against during an organizing campaign or first contract drive would have become two times back pay as liquidated damages, in addition to the back pay owed, for a total of three times back pay.

Currently, damages are limited to back pay, less any wages earned by an employee if they are hired by another employer. There would have been no provision for compensatory or punitive damages.

Finally, the bill would have provided for civil fines of up to $20,000 per violation against employers found to have willfully or repeatedly violated employees' rights during an organizing campaign or first contract drive. Currently there are no civil fines for such violations.

=== Jurisdictional standards ===
The Employee Free Choice Act would not have altered the existing jurisdictional standards of the National Labor Relations Board. The jurisdiction of the NLRB remains at the level set in 1959, $500,000 gross revenues for a retail business. The NLRB also requires a union to consist of a minimum of two employees who have no supervisory authority, exempting many small businesses from the increased penalties of the Employee Free Choice Act.

== Legislative history ==
=== 108th Congress ===
The Employee Free Choice Act was first introduced during the 108th Congress. On November 21, 2003, Representative George Miller (D-CA), then Ranking Member of the House Committee on Education and the Workforce, introduced H.R. 3619. A companion bill, S. 1925, was introduced the same day in the Senate by Senator Edward M. Kennedy (D-MA), joined at introduction by 22 Democratic co-sponsors. S. 1925 was referred to the "United States Senate Committee on Health, Education, Labor, and Pensions|Senate Committee on Health, Education, Labor, and Pensions." Neither bill received further action during the 108th Congress.

=== 109th Congress ===
On April 19, 2005, the Employee Free Choice Act was re-introduced in the 109th Congress. Representative George Miller (D-CA) introduced H.R. 1696, with Representative Peter King (R-NY) serving as a lead Republican co-sponsor; the bill ultimately garnered 214 co-sponsors from both parties. The Senate companion bill, S. 842, was introduced the same day by Senator Edward M. Kennedy (D-MA), joined by Senator Arlen Specter (R-PA) as a lead Republican co-sponsor. H.R. 1696 was referred to the Committee on Education and the Workforce and the Subcommittee on Employer-Employee Relations; neither the full Committee nor the Subcommittee took any action on the bill. Democratic members of the Committee did, however, conduct field forums on the legislation.

=== 110th Congress ===
On February 14, 2007, in a full Committee markup session, the House Committee on Education and Labor voted 26-19 to report the bill to the full House. Republican members of the committee voted unanimously against reporting the bill, citing numerous amendments proposed by Republican committee members that were rejected by the Democratic majority on the committee.

On March 1, 2007, the House of Representatives passed the bill, 241 to 185. On March 30, 2007, Senator Ted Kennedy (D-MA), Chairman of the Senate Committee on Health, Employment, Labor, and Pensions, introduced the Senate version of the Employee Free Choice Act.

On June 26, 2007, the Senate voted 51 to 48 on a motion to invoke cloture on the motion to proceed to consider the bill, 9 votes short of the 60 needed to invoke cloture and prevent an anticipated Republican filibuster. As a result, the bill failed to pass during the 110th United States Congress. In the 111th United States Congress, as of July 9, 2009, the Senate version of the EFCA, S.560, had 40 cosponsors in addition to its sponsor (Edward M. Kennedy, D, MA).

=== 111th Congress ===
On March 10, 2009, the bill was introduced in the 111th Congress by Sen. Kennedy (Democrat of Massachusetts) and Rep. George Miller (Democrat of California). Kennedy described the bill as "a critical step toward putting our economy back on track," while Miller also put the bill in the context of the 2008 financial crisis, declaring, "If we want a fair and sustainable recovery from this economic crisis, we must give workers the ability to stand up for themselves and once again share in the prosperity they help to create."

Although only 41 senators were Republicans, Senators Ben Nelson (Democrat of Nebraska) and Arlen Specter (Democrat and former Republican of Pennsylvania) announced that they did not support the bill in March 2009. In addition, Blanche Lincoln (Democratic senator for Arkansas) and Tom Carper (Democratic senator for Delaware) both stated in April that they would not vote for EFCA in its current form.

Dianne Feinstein (Democratic senator for California) has also announced that she would prefer to seek alternative legislation. Sen. Claire McCaskill indicated in a meeting with the Missouri Chamber of Commerce that it is unlikely that EFCA would pass in its current incarnation.

On July 7, 2009, Sen. Al Franken (D-MN) chose the bill as the first piece of legislation that he would co-sponsor, joining 40 other Democratic senators.

On July 16, 2009, reports were made that Senate advocates proposed dropping the provisions removing the employer's right to demand an extra ballot.

On July 17, 2009, The New York Times reported that in an effort to secure a filibuster-proof majority in the Senate, a group of key Democratic senators planned to change the proposed legislation to remove the "card check" provision of the EFCA, which would have allowed unions to be certified solely by majority sign-up.

=== 114th Congress ===
On April 20, 2016, the bill was introduced in the 114th Congress by Rep. Alan Grayson (Democrat of Florida).

== Debate ==
=== Proponents' views ===
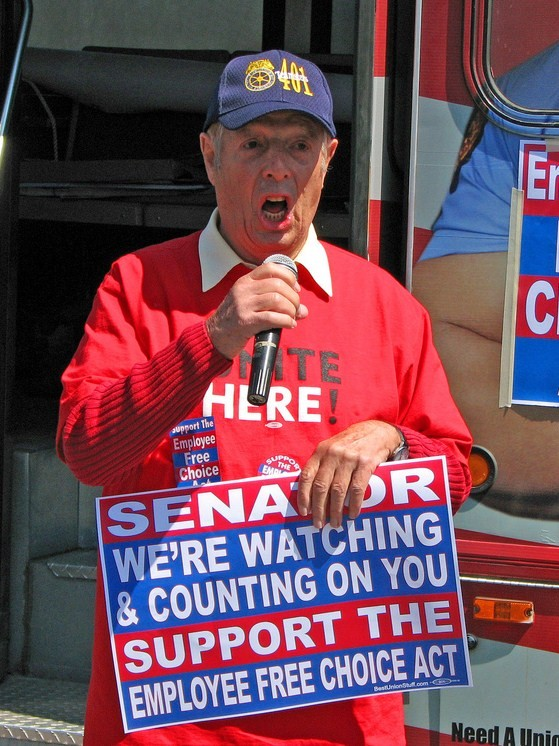
Pennsylvania labor leader Sam Bianco at a rally in Wilkes-Barre, Pennsylvania, calling on Arlen Specter to support the EFCA

Proponents of the legislation assert that the change is necessary to protect workers' rights to join unions. Under current law, employers are not required to take as determinative their workers' signed authorization forms designating a union as their representative "and may insist that the workers use a secret-ballot election conducted by the National Labor Relations Board (NLRB) to establish their union "even if 100% of the employees provide the NLRB with signed authorizations designating the union as their bargaining agent." The EFCA would allow workers to have their union certified as their bargaining agent by the NLRB if a majority of them have signed valid authorizations." EFCA proponents state that under current law the union ballots are "secret in name only" by citing experts such as University of Oregon professor Gordon Lafer, who in testimony before the U.S. Congress stated:

In the American democratic tradition the principle of the secret ballot is not simply the fact that you go into a voting booth and pull a curtain and nobody sees what you do. It is your right to keep your political opinion private to yourself before, during and after the act of voting; that you can't be lured or coerced into a conversation that is designed to make you reveal your political preferences. In the NLRB, while the vote does take place in a booth where nobody sees what you're doing, management is allowed to engage in a series of behaviors in the lead up to the vote that force the vast majority of workers to reveal how they're going to vote long before they ever step into the booth.

A U.S. House Committee on Education & Labor report asserted that the overall purpose of the Employee Free Choice Act is "allowing employees to make their own decision about whether they want to bargain together—to advocate for fairer wages, benefits and working conditions—without the threat or fear of harassment and retribution and fear of losing their livelihood."

The committee's Democrats quoted the conclusion of the nonpartisan international human rights organization Human Rights Watch:

[At present] a culture of near-impunity has taken shape in much of U.S. labor law and practice. Any employer intent on resisting workers' self-organization can drag out legal proceedings for years, fearing little more than an order to post a written notice in the workplace promising not to repeat unlawful conduct. Many employers have come to view remedies like back pay for workers fired because of union activity as routine costs of doing business, well worth it to get rid of organizing leaders and derail workers' organizing efforts.

In his remarks accompanying the bill's introduction, Representative George Miller (D-CA), chairman of the House Committee on Education and Labor, stated:

The current process for forming unions is badly broken and so skewed in favor of those who oppose unions, that workers must literally risk their jobs in order to form a union. Although it is illegal, one quarter of employers facing an organizing drive have been found to fire at least one worker who supports a union. In fact, employees who are active union supporters have a one-in-five chance of being fired for legal union activities. Sadly, many employers resort to spying, threats, intimidation, harassment and other illegal activity in their campaigns to oppose unions. The penalty for illegal activity, including firing workers for engaging in protected activity, is so weak that it does little to deter law breakers.

Even when employers don't break the law, the process itself stacks the deck against union supporters. The employer has all the power; they control the information workers can receive, can force workers to attend anti-union meetings during work hours, can force workers to meet with supervisors who deliver anti-union messages, and can even imply that the business will close if the union wins. Union supporters' access to employees, on the other hand, is heavily restricted.

The Employee Free Choice Act would add some fairness to the system…

President Barack Obama supported the bill. An original co-sponsor of the Employee Free Choice Act, Obama urged his Senate colleagues to pass the bill during a 2007 motion to proceed:

I support this bill because in order to restore a sense of shared prosperity and security, we need to help working Americans exercise their right to organize under a fair and free process and bargain for their fair share of the wealth our country creates. The current process for organizing a workplace denies too many workers the ability to do so. The Employee Free Choice Act offers to make binding an alternative process under which a majority of employees can sign up to join a union. Currently, employers can choose to accept--but are not bound by law to accept--the signed decision of a majority of workers. That choice should be left up to workers and workers alone.

"I will make it the law of the land when I'm President of the United States," he told a labor federation meeting in April 2008. The AFL–CIO states that, in practice, the company-controlled election process actually makes the process less democratic:

People call the current National Labor Relations Board (NLRB) election system a secret ballot election — but in fact it's not like any democratic election held anywhere else in our society. It's really a management-controlled election process because corporations have all the power. They control the information workers can receive and routinely poison the process by intimidating, harassing, coercing and even firing people who try to organize unions. No employee has free choice after being browbeaten by a supervisor to oppose the union or being told they may lose their job and livelihood if workers vote for the union."

In another speech to the AFL–CIO in 2010, Obama vowed to keep fighting for the bill.

Jeff Madrick, the editor of Challenge: The Magazine of Economic Affairs and a former columnist for Business Week and The New York Times, wrote that "good blue-collar jobs are disappearing rapidly as manufacturing industries decline; but many new white-collar jobs pay poorly, provide minimal health care and pension benefits, and offer little job security. There is now no privileged segment of earners in the nation except the upper 10 percent or so."

He added that "some 50 million non-unionized American workers, according to surveys, now say that they definitely or probably would join one if given the option. One of the reasons this does not happen, according to Madrick, is the failure of the federal government to protect workers trying to organize into unions. "The fines levied by the NLRB have long been meager," he notes. "Meantime, management actions against unions are supported by the nation's courts." Madrick concludes that "much can...be done" by "seriously enforcing the labor laws and imposing harsher penalties for violating them. The Employee Free Choice Act introduced by [then-] Senator Obama, among others, will be a good test."

To find out how effective the current NLRB system actually is—in other words, how well it reflects workers' wishes to organize into unions and bargain contracts with management—MIT Sloan School of Management professor Thomas A. Kochan and MIT Ph.D. student John Paul Ferguson used federal data to track the progress of more than 22,000 union organizing drives between 1999 and 2005. They found that "only one in five cases that filed an [NLRB] election petition ultimately reached a first contract [between workers and management]," which they reported in a The Boston Globe article. "This is despite all the cases already having shown substantial and likely majority support for representation."

They criticized the current system by asking, "How can anyone who thinks elections are a bulwark of democracy support a system in which a third of those interested in an election never get to hold one? Why would anyone put faith in a process that offers them a 1-in-5 chance of success?" Kochan and Ferguson thus called for passage of the Employee Free Choice Act along with other reforms.

=== Opponents' views ===
Critics contend that additional use of card check elections will lead to overt coercion on the part of union organizers. Opponents of the Employee Free Choice Act also claim that the measure would not protect employee privacy. Representative John Kline, R-Minn., has stated:

It is beyond me how one can possibly claim that a system whereby everyone—your employer, your union organizer, and your co-workers—knows exactly how you vote on the issue of unionization gives an employee 'free choice' ... It seems pretty clear to me that the only way to ensure that a worker is 'free to choose' is to ensure that there's a private ballot, so that no one knows how you voted. I cannot fathom how we were about to sit there today and debate a proposal to take away a worker's democratic right to vote in a secret-ballot election and call it 'Employee Free Choice.'

The bill's opponents also oppose the mandatory arbitration of disputes involving the terms of a first contract, asserting that such a procedure could constitute an improper intrusion of government into private business affairs and harmful for competitiveness and innovation. Opponents have also suggested that the arbitration mandate could lead to management resorting to offensive lockouts as a means to pressure unions and employees into accepting company proposals before the deadline for arbitration.

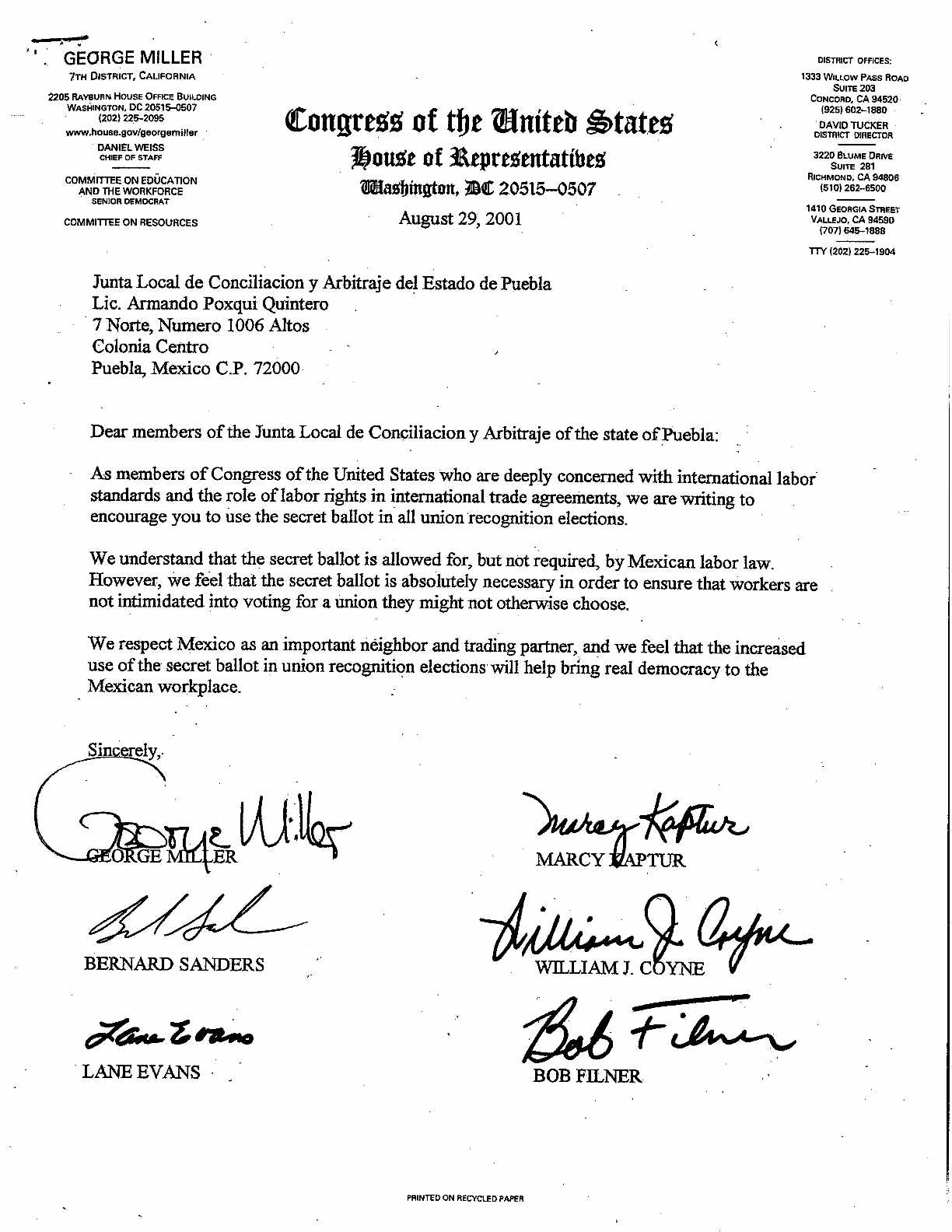
Letter to Mexican government officials from the sponsor of H.R.800. Source: Office of Congressman George Miller.

Opponents also point to a 2001 letter to Mexican government officials, signed by 11 Democrats who subsequently voted in favor of HR 800, encouraging the "use of secret ballots in all union recognition elections" that take place in Mexico. The letter further states, "we feel that the secret ballot is absolutely necessary in order to ensure that workers are not intimidated into voting for a union they might not otherwise choose," seeming to contradict the spirit of the legislation passed by the House. Congressman George Miller was the lead signatory of the 2001 letter and the sponsor of H.R.800. However, Miller and the other signatories to the 2001 letter now contend that their demand for a secret ballot election was limited to situations where "workers seek to replace one union with another union," although the letter makes no mention of this case and instead states "all union recognition elections."

The "Minority Views" section of the U.S. House Committee on Education & Labor report on the bill asserts: "H.R. 800, the deceptively-named Employee Free Choice Act, would strip [the right to a secret ballot] from every American worker. Moreover, the bill makes changes to federal labor law's scheme of penalties and remedies that are one-sided, unnecessary, and unprecedented. Finally, H.R. 800, for the first time in labor law's history, imposes a one-size-fits-all scheme of mandatory, binding interest arbitration with respect to initial contracts, on bargaining parties, again stripping American workers of the right to vote on the terms and conditions of their employment." The minority (Republican) views of the committee also quoted multiple federal and Supreme Court decisions:

A secret ballot election is the most satisfactory—indeed the preferred—method of ascertaining whether a union has majority support. (Gissel Packing, 395 U.S. 575, 602 (1969)).

[I]t is beyond dispute that secret election is a more accurate reflection of the employees' true desires than a check of authorization cards collected at the behest of a union organizer. (NLRB v. Flomatic Corp., 347 F.2d 74, 78 (2d Cir. 1965)).

Workers sometimes sign union authorization cards not because they intend to vote for the union in the election but to avoid offending the person who asks them to sign, often a fellow worker, or simply to get the person off their back.... (NLRB v. Village IX, Inc., 723 F.2d 1360, 1371 (7th Cir. 1983)).

In 2007, 28 Republican Senators supported an opposition bill, the Secret Ballot Protection Act, which would eliminate the use of the card check procedure. In 1947 a similar proposal to eliminate the use of cards was rejected in conference in the House of Representatives.

Former Democratic presidential nominee George McGovern released political advertisements in opposition to the bill, saying: "It's hard to believe that any politician would agree to a law denying millions of employees the right to a private vote.... Quite simply, this proposed law cannot be justified." McGovern first broke with Democratic Party orthodoxy on the EFCA by opposing the proposed bill in an August 2008 editorial in The Wall Street Journal:

To my friends supporting EFCA I say this: We cannot be a party that strips working Americans of the right to a secret-ballot election. We are the party that has always defended the rights of the working class. To fail to ensure the right to vote free of intimidation and coercion from all sides would be a betrayal of what we have always championed.

University of Chicago legal professor Richard Epstein also wrote a The Wall Street Journal editorial opposing the act, saying that it is unconstitutional due to restrictions on free speech.

The U.S. Chamber of Commerce's Randel Johnson declared that the "coming fight in Congress over the issue" is a "firestorm bordering on Armageddon." The commerce spent an estimated $20 million over two years against the bill. Other business interests have offered similarly strong characterizations of the proposed bill. Sheldon Adelson, a Las Vegas casino owner and real-estate developer, stated: "Radical Islam and Employee Free Choice are the 'two fundamental threats to society." Mark McKinnon, a spokesman for the Workforce Fairness Institute, said businesses were "hearing about it, and are ready to riot in the street about it." Forbes magazine national editor Mike Ozanian said: "The Employee Free Choice Act should be called the anti-free choice, pro-slavery bill."

Business reaction

During an October 17, 2008, conference call, Home Depot co-founder Bernie Marcus spoke against the EFCA, calling it "the demise of a civilization". He went on to say: "If a retailer has not gotten involved with this, if he has not spent money on this election, if he has not sent money to Norm Coleman and these other guys," then those retailers "should be shot; should be thrown out of their goddamn jobs."

In January 2009, FedEx exercised an option to buy fifteen Boeing 777F planes and had an option to buy fifteen more. The contract between the two companies allows FedEx to cancel the second order if Congress passes the EFCA. In April 2009, the Associated Builders and Contractors sent a letter to every member of Congress on behalf of 3,000 construction firms opposing the bill in any form.

== Response by states ==
In 2010, four states passed constitutional amendments guaranteeing a secret ballot on union recognition: Arizona, South Carolina, South Dakota, and Utah. This was due in part to the efforts of the organization Save Our Secret Ballot. All of these are "Right-to-Work" where employees would not have to join the union anyway.

== See also ==
- United States labor law
- NLRB election procedures
- Union organizer
- Protecting the Right to Organize Act and Workplace Democracy Act, similar congressional proposals
- Reward Work Act
- Accountable Capitalism Act
- Fair Labor Standards Act of 1938
- Adamson Act
- Paycheck Fairness Act
- Trade Union Freedom Bill, a proposed UK law
