= Milton Ezrati =

Economist, investment manager and author

Milton Ezrati is an economist, investment manager, and author. He currently serves as the Chief Economist of Vested, a financial communications agency. His blog, Bitesize Investing, discusses the basics of successful investing, one bite-sized piece at a time. Previously, Ezrati was the Chief Economist for Lord Abbett, one of the oldest investment firms in the U.S. He is also the author of Thirty Tomorrows:The Next Three Decades of Globalization, Demographics, and How We Will Live. and Kawari.

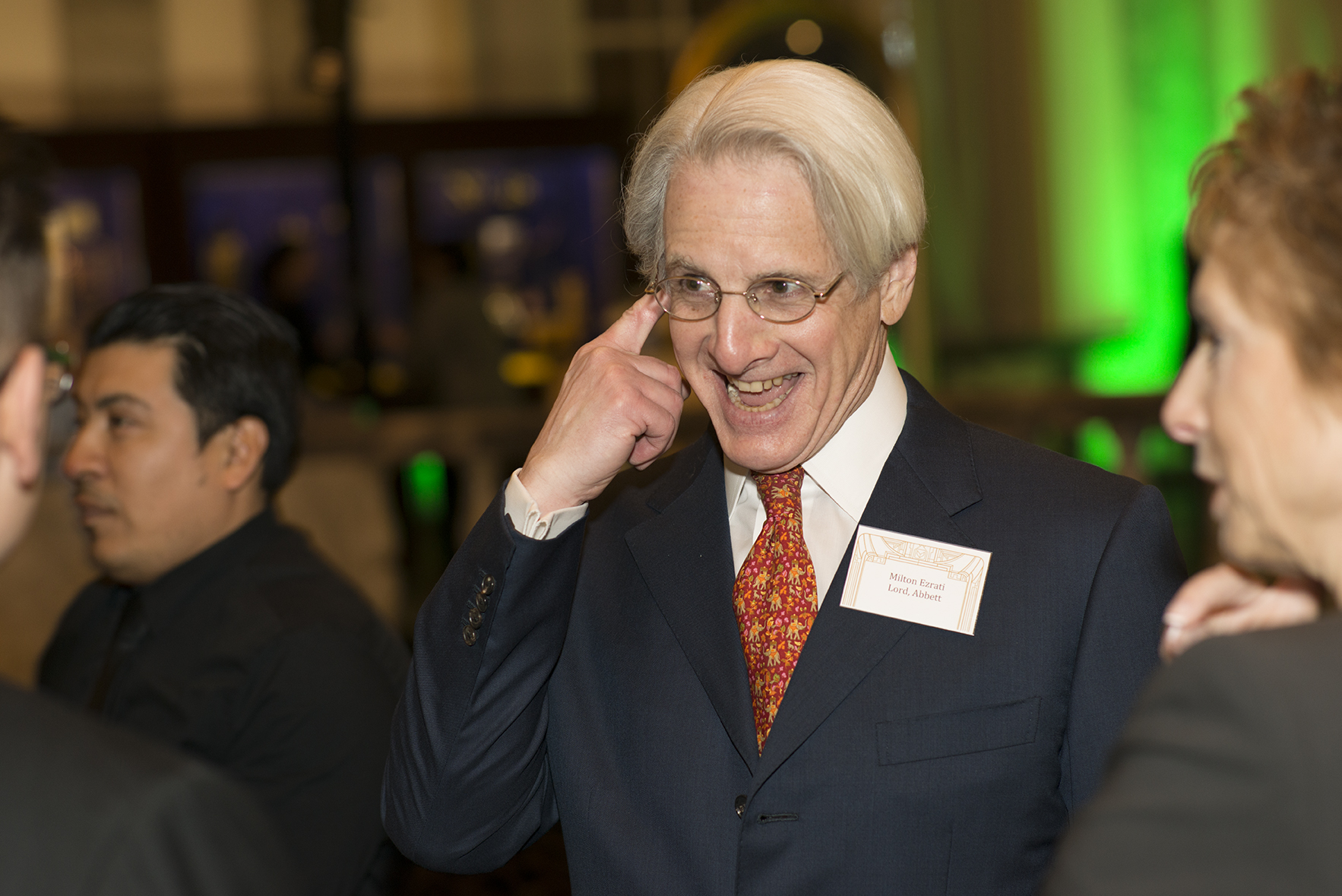
Milton Ezrati, economist and author.

Ezrati speaks regularly on economic and investment topics to the media, including CNBC Fox Business, Bloomberg, BNN, The Wall Street Journal, Dow Jones, Reuters and serves as contributing editor to the National Interest.

== Education ==
Mr. Ezrati received an MSS in mathematical economics from the University of Birmingham in England and a BA in economics from the State University of New York.

== Career ==
In 1981 Ezrati joined Manufacturers Hanover Investment Corp where he spent six years as the Director of Research. In 1987 Ezrati was appointed Senior Vice President and Head of Investing for the Americas at Nomura Asset Management USA. He assumed the role of Chief Investment Officer at Nomura Capital Management in 1987. During his tenure, Ezrati oversaw all of the investing in the Americas for Nomura Capital Management's institutional investment arm. He also served as a member of the International Asset Allocation Team for Nomura Capital Management.

Ezrati joined Lord Abbett in 2000 as a Senior Economist and Market Strategist, and was named a Partner in 2004. Ezrati retired from Lord Abbett in 2015. Additionally, Mr. Ezrati is a frequent commentator in the media on financial markets and economics. He has appeared on CNBC, Bloomberg TV, and Fox Business, and has been quoted in a variety of publications, including The Wall Street Journal, Barron's, and Financial Times. Most recently in 2015, Ezrati became a contributing editor at The National Interest.

Ezrati currently serves as the Chief Economist of Vested, a financial communications agency.

== Bibliography ==
Milton Ezrati is the author of "Thirty Tomorrows:The Next Three Decades of Globalization Demographics and How We Will Live" Ezrati is also the author of "Kawari", in which he discusses the economic and cultural transformation of Japan, following the country's recession in the 1990s.

== Other work ==
Ezrati is an Affiliate of the Center on Human Capital and Economic Growth in the Department of Economics at the State University of New York at Buffalo and has lectured at New York University and the Fletcher School at Tufts University
