= Accountable Capitalism Act =

Proposal by Elizabeth Warren to require codetermination in the United States

The Accountable Capitalism Act, 115th Congress (2017–18) S. 3348 was a proposed federal bill introduced by Senator Elizabeth Warren in August 2018. It would require any company with revenue over $1 billion to obtain a federal corporate charter. For these companies, employees would elect 40% of the board of directors and a 75% vote of shareholders and directors would be required to approve any political spending. The Act contains a "constituency statute" that would give directors a duty of "creating a general public benefit" with regard to a corporation's stakeholders, including shareholders, employees, and the environment, and the interests of the enterprise in the long-term.

== Reception ==
Political commentator Matthew Yglesias wrote that "Warren's plan starts from the premise that corporations that claim the legal rights of personhood should be legally required to accept the moral obligations of personhood." The New York Times columnist David Leonhardt called the proposal "the most intriguing policy idea to come out of the early 2020 campaign".

Meanwhile, National Review contributor, Samuel Hammond, was highly critical of the bill: "Yet the fact remains that the Accountable Capitalism Act is in many ways the most radical proposal advanced by a mainstream Democratic lawmaker to date...unlike universal health care or increased spending on the poor, Warren’s proposal is to fundamentally upend the way the most productive companies in the American economy work from the top down."

Milton Ezrati stated that the bill would create many unwanted consequences such as incentivizing companies to incorporate in other countries, where they would not be governed by this law, and encouraging investors to prefer overseas companies, where the investors could still be the most important consideration in company decisions. Also, if a company did incorporate in the US, the requirement to balance the conflicting interests of shareholders, employees, community, and environment, and loss of license to operate if this were not done satisfactorily, would lead to "a surge of lobbying and worse still, a growth of crony competition" as the government becomes the entity that decides whether corporate decisions are acceptable.

== See also ==
- Codetermination
- United States corporate law
- United States labor law
- Social ownership#Social ownership of equity
- Reward Work Act
- Employee Free Choice Act
- Workplace Democracy Act
- Labor unions in the United States
