= Constituency statute =

A constituency statute is a term in US corporate law for a rule that requires a board of directors to pay regard to the interests of all corporate stakeholders in their decision making. A constituency statute is intended to give directors of corporations the discretion to balance the interests of stakeholders, rather than have to solely focus on maximizing shareholder value in a way that could damage the long-term sustainability of the enterprise.

== State laws ==
In 1991, 28 states were recorded as having constituency statutes. Professor Charles Hansen recorded the following:

A. Typical Permissive

- 1. Arizona Ariz.Rev.Stat.Ann.§ 10-1202(Supp. 1990).
- 2. Connecticut Conn.Gen.Stat.Ann.§ 33-313 (2018).
- 3. Florida Fla. Stat.Ann.§ 607.0830(WestSupp. 1991).
- 4. Georgia Ga. CodeAnn.§ 14-2-202(b)(5)(1989).
- 5. Hawaii Haw. Rev.Stat.§ 415-35(b)(1988 & Supp. 1990).
- 6. Idaho Idaho Code § 30-1702(Supp. 1990).
- 7. Illinois Il.Stat.Ann.ch.805, Bus. Org. §18.85(Smith-HurdSupp.1990).
- 8. Kentucky Ky.Rev.Stat.Ann.271B.§ 12-210(4)(Michie1989& Supp.1990).
- 9. Louisiana La. Rev.Stat.Ann.§ 12:92(G) (WestSupp. 1991).
- 10. Maine Me. Rev. Stat.Ann.tit.13A, § 716 (Supp. 1990).
- 11. Massachusetts Mass.Gen.Laws Ann.eh.156B,§65(Law.Co-op.Supp. 1991).
- 12. Minnesota Minn.Stat.Ann.§ 302A.251(5)(WestSupp. 1991).
- 13. Mississippi Miss. Code Ann.§ 79-4-8.30(d)(Supp. 1990).
- 14. Missouri Mo. Rev.Stat.§ 351.347.1(4)(VernonSupp. 1991).
- 15. Neb. Rev. Stat.§ 21-2035(l)(c) (Supp. 1990).
- 16. New Jersey N.J.Stat.Ann.§ 14A:6-1(2)(WestSupp. 1990).
- 17. New Mexico N.M. Stat.Ann.§ 53-ll-35(D) (Supp. 1989).
- 18. New York N.Y. Bus. Corp.Law § 717(b) (McKinneySupp. 1991).
- 19. Ohio OhioRev.CodeAnn.§ 1701.59(E) (Page'sSupp. 1990).
- 20. Oregon Or. Rev. Stat.§ 60.357(5) (Supp. 1990).
- 21. Rhode Island R.I. Gen. Laws § 7-5.2-8(a) (Supp. 1990).
- 22. South Dakota S.D. CodifiedLaws Ann.§ 47-33-4(Supp. 1990).
- 23. Tennessee Tenn.CodeAnn.§ 48-35-204(1988).
- 24. Wisconsin Wis.Stat.Ann.§180.305(WestSupp.1990).
- 25. Wyoming Wyo.Stat.§ 17-16-830(1989).

B. Permissive Interest of Shareholders Not Dominant

- 1. Indiana Ind. Code Ann.§ 23-l-35-l(d) (West 1989 & Supp.1990).
- 2. Iowa IowaCodeAnn.§491.101B(WestSupp.1990).
- 3. Pennsylvania Pa. Stat.Ann.tit.15,§§ 511,1721(c)(PurdonSupp. 1990).

== See also ==
- US corporate law
- Accountable Capitalism Act
