= Trade Union Freedom Bill =

The Trade Union Freedom Bill is a proposal by the United Kingdom Trades Union Congress for legislation which would give greater freedom to unions and their members to collectively bargain and take action to support their interests Rights and Freedoms Bill 2006-07. It was proposed in 2006, the centenary of the Trade Disputes Act 1906, the founding statute by which unions taking strike action are not liable to employers for the lost profits of business, so long as the action is taken "in contemplation or furtherance of a trade dispute." The bill was introduced by John McDonnell

== Overview ==
The core idea behind the proposed Bill is to maximise the freedom of workers for participating in industrial action as a last resort, and not be liable to any detrimental response by an employer for doing so or having done so. A summary of the proposals in the Bill are laid out at the TUC's website. An overview is stated to be,

- Improved protection from dismissal and more effective remedies for workers taking part in official industrial action;
- Simplification of the complex regulations on notices and ballots which restrict the ability of unions to organise industrial action where a clear majority of members have voted in support; and
- Modernisation of what constitutes a trade dispute, enabling limited forms of supportive action, thereby ensuring that UK industrial action laws reflect changes in UK labour market, including increased contracting out and enabling unions to respond where employers take steps to outsource work during the course of a dispute with a view to breaking a strike.

The proposed Bill has received widespread support from trade unions and some academics.

== See also ==
- UK labour law
- Trade Union and Labour Relations (Consolidation) Act 1992
- Employee Free Choice Act, a proposed US law
