= Faster Labor Contracts Act =

H. R. 5408
- Long title: To accelerate workplace time-to-contract under the National Labor Relations Act.
- Nicknames: Faster Labor Contracts Act
- Number of co-sponsors: 110

Legislative history
- Introduced in the House of Representatives by Donald Norcross (D–NJ) and Pete Stauber (R–MN) on September 16, 2025

The Faster Labor Contracts Act (FLCA) is a proposed act of the United States Congress introduced in September 2025 that would mandate employers engage in contract negotiations with labor unions within ten days of a union's request to negotiate. If an employer and union do not come to an agreement within 90 days, the act requires mediation, and if mediation does not result in a contract, an arbitration board would set initial contract terms.

== Background ==
The bill would amend the National Labor Relations Act, which did not set a time deadline for contract negotiations.

Labor negotiations typically take over a year to finalize first contracts in the United States. Union advocates often argue negotiation periods should be shorter. Employers often oppose faster contract legislation. Senator Josh Hawley wrote the bill in response to a 1,400+ day contract negotiation between Amazon employees and their employer.

=== PRO Act ===
The main legislative provision in the Fair Labor Contracts Act was initially a part of the Protecting the Right to Organize Act, which had been passed by the House in 2021.

== Legislative history ==
The FLCA passed the House on June 9, 2026 after reaching the floor via a discharge petition. The petition was signed by 211 Democrats with the support of Republican representatives Don Bacon, Riley Moore, and Nick LaRota. The House bill passed with unanimous Democratic support and support from 20 Republicans. The bill has advanced to the Senate for consideration. The FLCA has support from Democratic senators Gary Peters, Cory Booker, and Jeff Merkley, as well as Republican senators Josh Hawley, Roger Marshall, and Bernie Moreno.

== Response ==
The bill was endorsed by the Teamsters. Teamsters president Sean O'Brien described the bill as "one of the most consequential labor bills to come before Congress in generations".

The CHRO Association, a large United States HR firm opposed the bill, calling it "draconian" and criticized the concept of a government arbitrator writing a contract for unions and employers. The US Chamber of Commerce opposes the bill.
