= Reward Work Act =

Proposed law banning stock buybacks and requiring codetermination in the United States

The Reward Work Act of 2018 (S.2605 and HR 6096) is a proposed United States Act of Congress to ban unjustified stock buy-backs, and to require that every listed company enable employees to elect one-third of the board of directors. The bill was sponsored initially by Senators Tammy Baldwin, Elizabeth Warren and Brian Schatz in March 2018, joined in April 2018 by Kirsten Gillibrand, and in November 2018 by Bernie Sanders. It was sponsored in the House of Representatives in June 2018 by Keith Ellison and Ro Khanna.

== Contents ==
Section 2 prohibits stock buybacks on the open market.

Section 3 requires one-third board representation for employees of listed companies. Specifically, this amends §12b of the Securities Exchange Act of 1934 (15 USC 78l(b)(1)) to add "No issuer may register securities on a national exchange unless at least 1/3 of the issuer’s directors are chosen by the issuing company’s employees in a one-employee-one-vote election process." It then requires the Securities and Exchange Commission, consulting with the National Labor Relations Board to make regulations ensuring democratic election processes, and 1/3 of an issuer's board to "be composed of employee representatives within 2 years of the date of enactment of this Act."

== Reception ==
The Act was welcomed by the Roosevelt Institute, and media outlets.

A Civis poll found people in "the “lean Democrat” category voted 75% in favor of the question, and just 9% opposed. Around 43% of the “lean Republican” category supported the concept, while 31% opposed, and the pure Republican category saw 4% more opposed than in favor. But overall, a clear majority of people favor the concept."

== See also ==
- US labor law
- European labour law
- UK labour law
- Codetermination
- Workplace Democracy Act
- Fair Labor Standards Act of 1938
- Adamson Act
- Paycheck Fairness Act
- Employee Free Choice Act
- Labor unions in the United States
- Accountable Capitalism Act
