= Falguni Shane Peacock =

Indian fashion house

- Company type: Private
- Industry: Fashion
- Founded: 2004
- Founder: Falguni Peacock; Shane Peacock
- Headquarters: Mumbai and New York City
- Area served: Worldwide
- Website: falgunishanepeacock.com

Falguni Shane Peacock, also known by initials FSP, is an Indian fashion house established by the designer duo Falguni Peacock and Shane Peacock in 2004. The brand focuses on couture, wedding wear, and occasion wear and is based in Mumbai, India. In 2022, Falguni Shane Peacock was awarded the hall of fame award by the Fashion Design Council of India.

== History ==
=== 2004 ===
Falguni Shane Peacock was founded by the husband and wife designer duo, Falguni Peacock and Shane Peacock, in 2004. Shane entered the apparel export business after completing a fashion design course in Mumbai. While, Falguni, with a commercial arts degree in Mumbai, entered the fashion design field. In 2004, the duo launched their label, Falguni Shane Peacock, and started retailing in India. In 2004, their Pret Peacock store opened in Mumbai. The store catered to the customized design market. Later, it expanded to offer ready-made clothes for both men and women. They retailed their products through outlets such as Harrods in London and Villa Moda in Kuwait. In the same year, Falguni Shane Peacock showcased their first collection and made a debut in India at the Lakmé India Fashion Week.

=== 2005-2009 ===
The duo forayed into international fashion weeks, beginning with Miami Fashion Week and LA Fashion Week. They gained recognition for their resort line. In 2009, they debuted at London Fashion Week and continued to showcase their collections there for six consecutive seasons. After a couple of seasons in London, Harrods, the British retailer, signed them for a retail contract. Their big break, however, came when, after a private and celebrity-centric showing in Los Angeles, singer Fergie approached them to design her dress for the FIFA World Cup 2010.

=== 2010-2023 ===
In 2011, they made their debut at New York Fashion Week, later expanding their presence to various fashion events, including Miami and LA Fashion Week. They participated in ten seasons at New York Fashion Week. They have received recognition for their work, such as the Anokhi Prestige Awards in 2013 and the Bharat Samman Award in 2014. Additionally, they won the World Fashion Designer Award at the Miss World Beauty Pageant and the Vogue Power List Award in India. The duo has dressed several Hollywood celebrities for international events and music videos, including Beyonce, Jennifer Lopez, Katy Perry, and Rihanna. In 2022, Falguni Shane Peacock received the Shiromani Award at the NRI World Summit for their contributions to the Indian fashion industry and philanthropy through The Peacock Foundation.

== Popular cultures ==
=== Television series ===
In the sixth episode of "And Just Like That...", Sarah Jessica Parker, portraying Carrie Bradshaw, wore a lehenga from Falguni Shane Peacock's spring-summer 2020 collection.
