= National Writers Union =

United States trade union

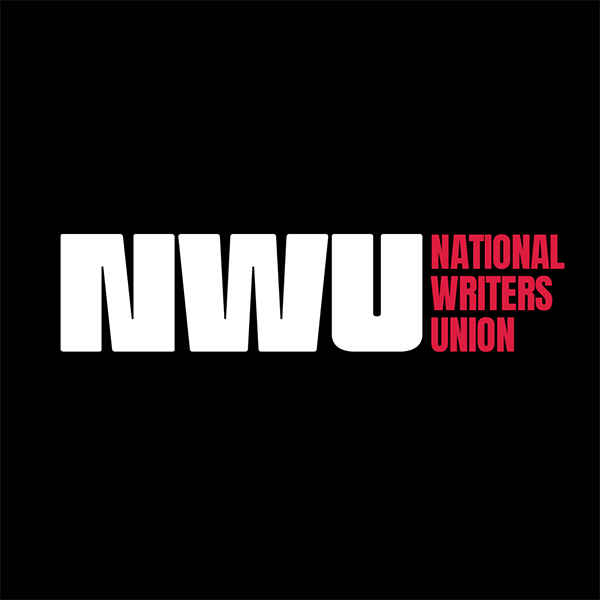

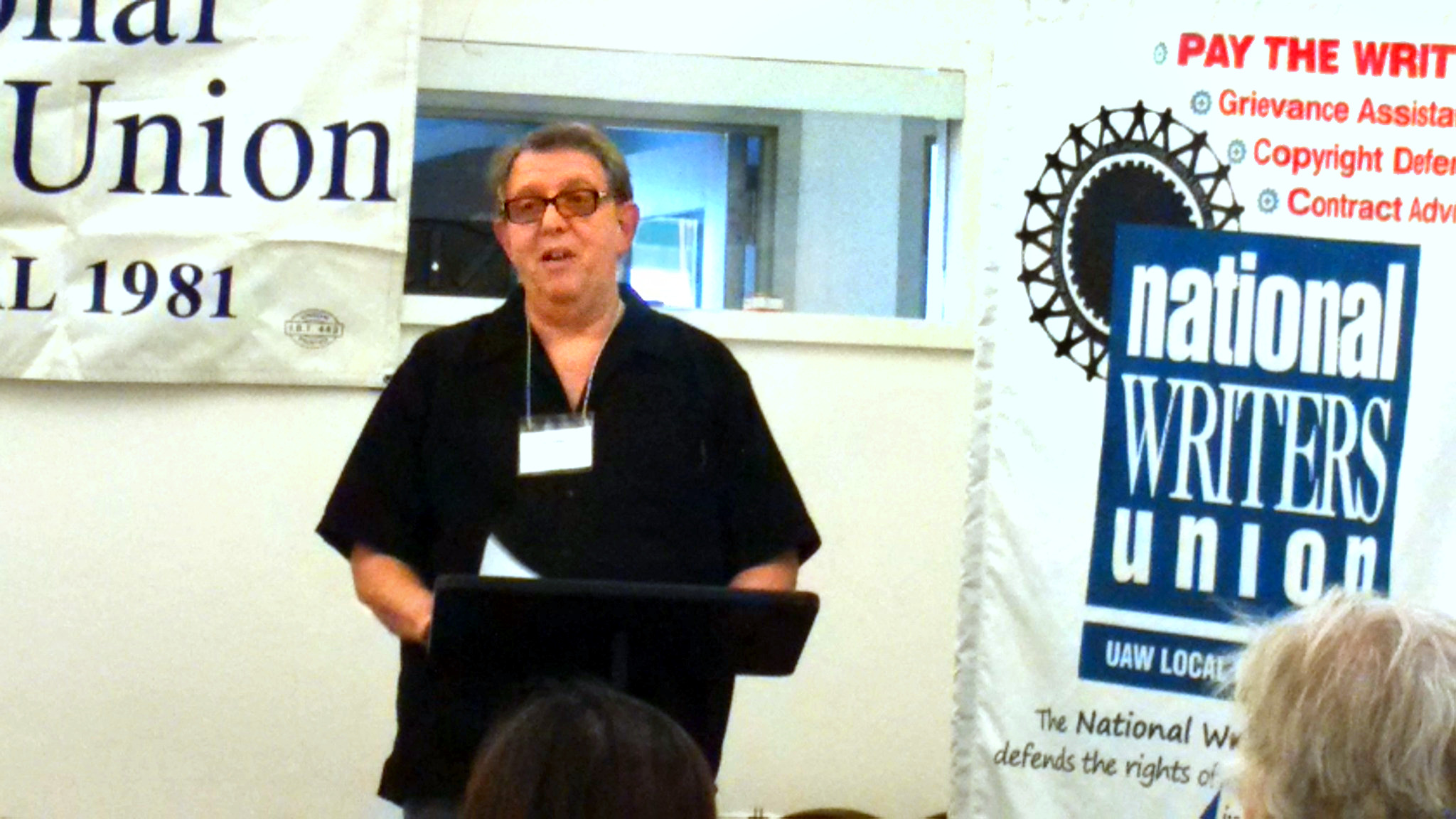
- NWU President Larry Goldbetter addresses the union's delegate assembly.
- Abbreviation: NWU
- Formation: 19 November 1981; 44 years ago
- Type: Trade union
- Purpose: To defend the rights of and improve the economic and working conditions for all writers
- Region served: United States
- Parent organization: International Federation of Journalists
- Website: nwu.org

National Writers Union (NWU) is a trade union in the United States for freelance and contract writers founded on 19 November 1981. NWU is affiliated with the International Federation of Journalists (IFJ), the International Authors Forum (IAF), and the International Federation of Reproduction Rights Organisations (IFRRO).

== Purpose ==
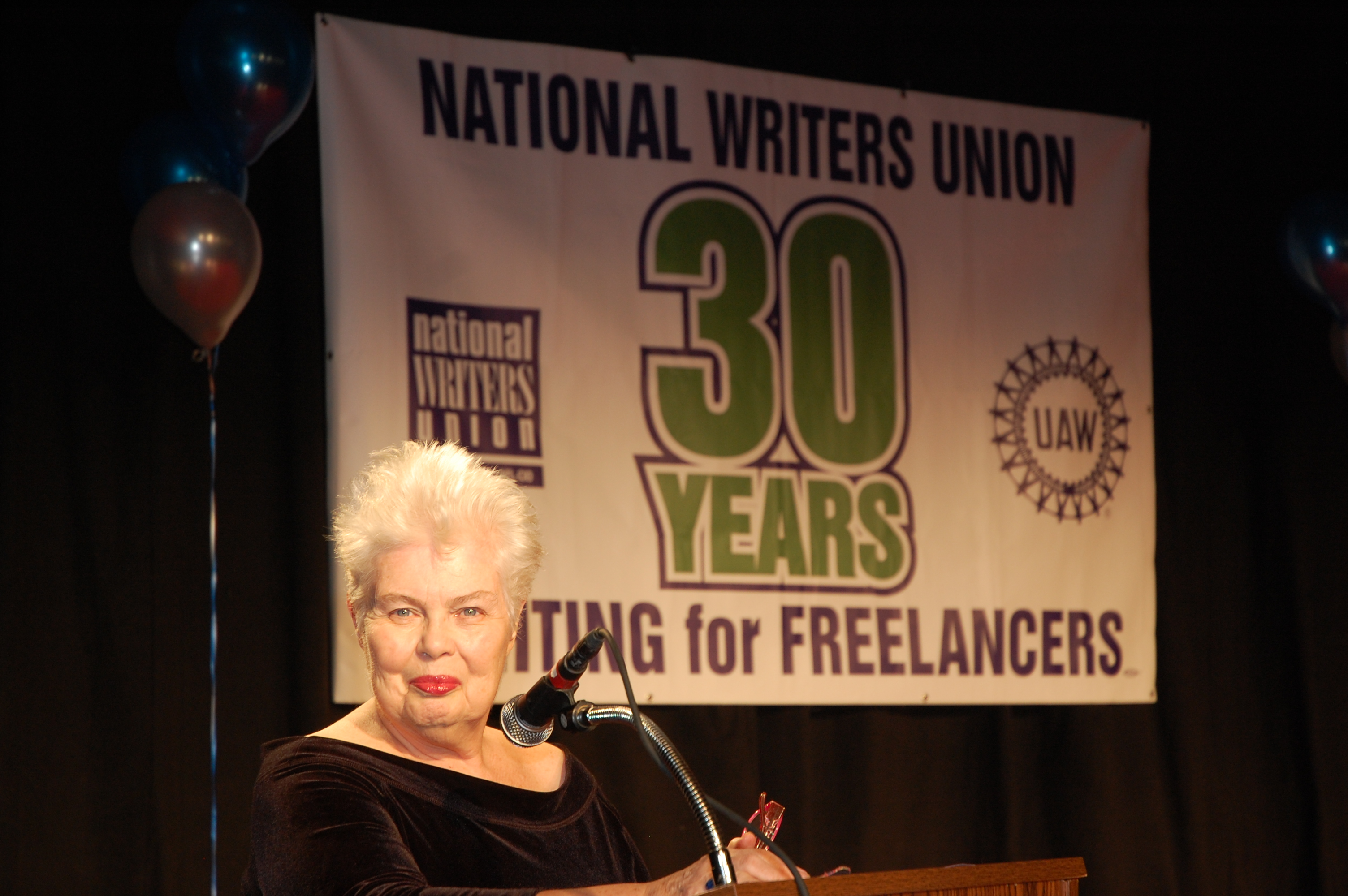
Susan E. Davis speaking at the National Writers Union

The NWU seeks to defend the rights of, and improve the economic and working conditions for, all writers. It offers advocacy, contract advice, grievance assistance, a job hotline, member education, press passes for qualified members, writer alerts and warnings, and access to group rate health and dental insurance (in certain geographic areas). The union also issues various publications and an irregular journal called American Writer.

== Structure ==
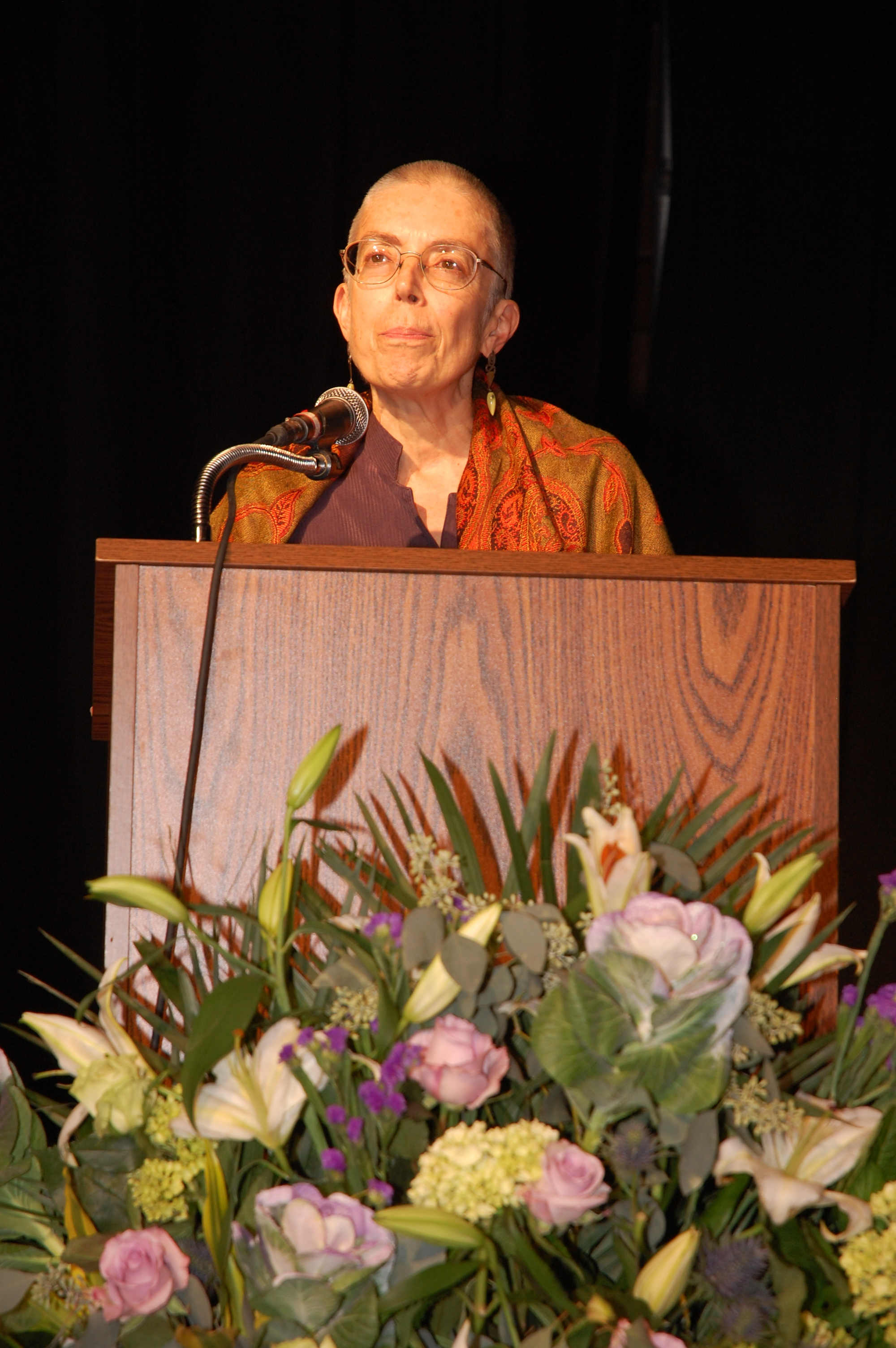
Jan Clausen speaking at National Writers Union

Ultimate power in the NWU rests in the biennial Delegate Assembly (DA) and delegates are elected to the assembly by 17 local chapters and serve a term of two years. Each chapter is allocated a number of delegates according to the size of its membership. The DA sets over-all union strategy and policy, charters new locals, and establishes national working bodies that carry out union activities. Delegates are unpaid volunteers.

The National Executive Committee (NEC) consists of 11 officers directly elected by the membership. The NEC administers the union between meetings of the National Executive Board (NEB), oversees union staff, initiates new union activities, and implements strategies, campaigns, projects, and policies adopted by the Delegate Assembly.

The President is paid a full-time salary and the Vice presidents and Financial Secretary/Treasurer are paid part-time salaries. (The question of salaries is the subject of perennial debate within the NWU.)

There is a National Executive Board (NEB), consisting of the 11 officers of the National Executive Committee plus the chairs of the 17 local chapters. The NEB meets annually to approve the annual budget and to review the implementation of policies adopted by the Delegate Assembly.

Contested elections for the National Executive Committee officers have occasionally been the subject of great controversy within the NWU, and a considerable level of acrimony has inevitably developed. In particular, during one re-election attempt, a president was charged with using union funds to promote his campaign. The charge went to the US Department of Labor, but the department refused to hear the case after Lowell Peterson, a United Auto Workers lawyer, insisted that Federal labor law did not apply to the Writers Union. Despite its name, wrote Peterson, on behalf of the NWU and President Jonathan Tasini, the union was in fact not legally a "labor organization," since its members are freelancers. Peterson's position was felt by many members to undermine two decades of work in establishing the NWU as writers' legitimate bargaining representative under Federal labor law.

== History ==
The NWU previously was Local 1981 of the United Automobile Workers, AFL–CIO since merging with them in 1992. On 11 May 2020, the NWU disaffiliated with the UAW.

== Cases ==
The best-known activity of the NWU is probably the 2001 victory in Tasini v. Times, in which the United States Supreme Court in a decisive 7–2 ruling affirmed the copyright privileges of freelance writers whose works were originally published in periodicals and then licensed by the publishers to electronic databases without explicit permission of, or compensation to, the writers.

In 2008, NWU joined over 60 other art licensing businesses (including the Artists Rights Society, Association of American Editorial Cartoonists, Illustrator's Partnership of America, Society of Children's Book Writers and Illustrators, the Stock Artists Alliance, and the Advertising Photographers of America, among others) in opposing both The Orphan Works Act of 2008 and The Shawn Bentley Orphan Works Act of 2008. Known collectively as "Artists United Against the U.S. Orphan Works Acts," the diverse organizations joined forces to oppose the bills, which the groups believe "permits, and even encourages, wide-scale infringements while depriving creators of protections currently available under the Copyright Act."

In 2017, the NWU sued Ebony magazine for $200,000 on behalf of writers who were owed money. The suit was settled with writers being paid $74,000.

== Other advocacy ==
In February 2019, the NWU published a statement by a number of author organizations regarding the Internet Archive's Open Library project. The NWU was concerned that freely distributing copies of authors' works violated the protections that those authors get from copyright laws. The statement called for "a dialogue among writers, authors, publishers, and librarians on how to enable and create the digital libraries we all want, in ways that fully respect authors’ rights"

The Freelance Solidarity Project was organized by NWU in September 2019 with the aim of organizing freelance, permalance, staff, and contract workers. FSP is overseen by a twelve-member committee that aims to set industry wide standards for freelancers.

== See also ==
- Writers Guild of America
- Books in the United States
