= Food self-provisioning =

Growing of one's own food

Food self-provisioning (FSP) is the growing of one's own food, especially fruits and vegetables. Also labelled as household food production, is a traditional activity persisting in the countries of the Global North. It is studied in sustainability science and in ecofeminism on reason of its social, health and environmental outcomes.
