= Freelance Solidarity Project =

National Writers Union division for freelance media workers

- Abbreviation: FSP
- Formation: 2018; 8 years ago
- Region served: United States
- Parent organization: National Writers Union
- Website: freelancesolidarity.org

The Freelance Solidarity Project is a division of the US-based National Writers Union (NWU) that organizes freelance media and communications workers. The group formed in 2018 out of meetings held by the Writers Guild of America, East, although the founding journalists eventually decided to affiliate with the NWU.
