= Paycheck Fairness Act =

Proposed law to address the gender pay gap

- Long title: To amend the Fair Labor Standards Act of 1938 to provide more effective remedies to victims of discrimination in the payment of wages on the basis of sex, and for other purposes.
- Announced in: the 119th United States Congress
- Sponsored by: Rosa DeLauro (D-CT)
- Number of co-sponsors: 218

Legislative history
- Introduced in the House of Representatives as H.R. 17 by Rosa DeLauro (D–CT) on March 25, 2025; Committee consideration by House Education and Labor

The Paycheck Fairness Act (H.R.7) is a proposed United States labor law that would add procedural protections to the Equal Pay Act of 1963 and the Fair Labor Standards Act as part of an effort to address the gender pay gap in the United States. A Census Bureau report published in 2008 stated that women's median annual earnings were 77.5% of men's earnings. Recently this has narrowed, as by 2018, this was estimated to have decreased to women earning 80-85% of men's earnings. One study suggests that when the data is controlled for certain variables, the residual gap is around 5-7%; the same study concludes that the residual is because "hours of work in many occupations are worth more when given at particular moments and when the hours are more continuous. That is, in many occupations, earnings have a nonlinear relationship with respect to hours."

The bill "punishes employers for retaliating against workers who share wage information, puts the justification burden on employers as to why someone is paid less and allows workers to sue for punitive damages of wage discrimination". Another provision of the bill would start programs to train women in ways to better negotiate their wages.

== Background ==
Proponents of the Paycheck Fairness Act consider it an extension of the laws established by the Equal Pay Act of 1963, which makes it illegal for employers to pay unequal wages to men and women who perform substantially equal work. In order to find an employer in violation of the Equal Pay Act, a plaintiff must prove that "(1) the employer pays different wages to employees of the opposite sex; (2) the employees perform equal work on jobs requiring equal skill, effort, and responsibility; and (3) the jobs are performed under similar working conditions."[1] Even if the individual makes each of these showings, the defendant employer may avoid liability by proving that the wage disparity is justified by one of four affirmative defenses—that is, that the employer has set the challenged wages pursuant to "(1) a seniority system; (2) a merit system; (3) a system which measures earnings by quantity or quality of production; or (4) a differential based on any other factor other than sex."

Fifty years after the law's passage, a median earnings gap still exists between men and women. According to U.S. News & World Report, the Paycheck Fairness Act is meant to close this gap by:

- "making wages more transparent";
- "requiring that employers prove that wage discrepancies are tied to legitimate business qualifications and not gender";
- and "prohibiting companies from taking retaliatory action against employees who raise concerns about gender-based wage discrimination".

== Legislative history ==
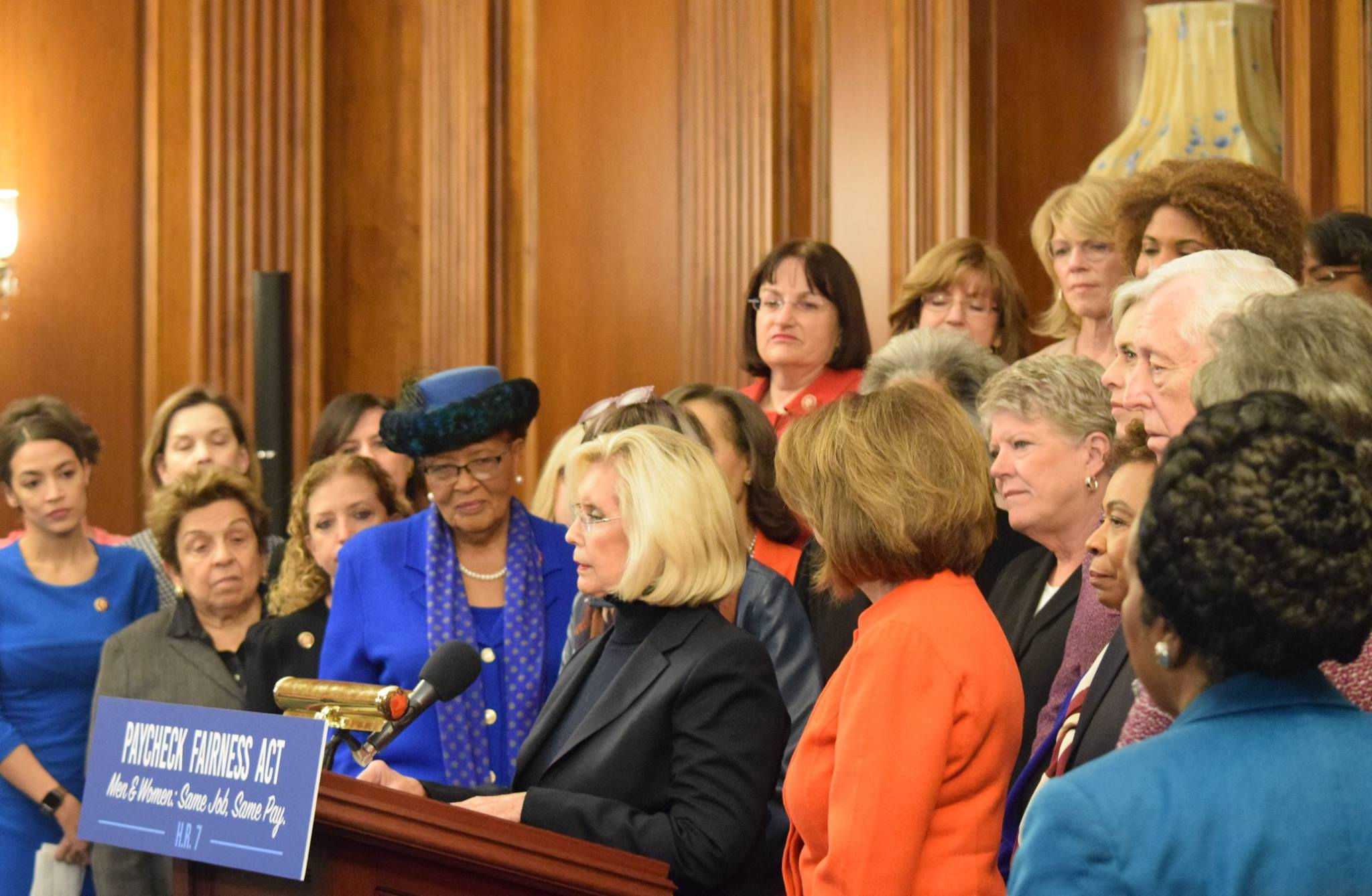
Lilly Ledbetter speaking in support of the Paycheck Fairness Act in 2020.

The bill was first introduced in 1997, and has been reintroduced to congress many times, including:

Congress	Short title	Bill number(s)	Date introduced	Sponsor(s)	# of cosponsors	Latest status
105th Congress	Paycheck Fairness Act of 1997	H.R. 2023	June 24, 1997	Rosa DeLauro (D-CT)	95	Died in Committee
105th Congress	Paycheck Fairness Act of 1997	S. 71	January 21, 1997	Tom Daschle (D-SD)	23	Died in Committee
106th Congress	Paycheck Fairness Act of 1999	H.R. 541	February 3, 1999	Rosa DeLauro (D-CT)	122	Died in Committee
106th Congress	Paycheck Fairness Act of 1999	H.R. 2397	June 30, 1999	Rosa DeLauro (D-CT)	170	Died in Committee
106th Congress	Paycheck Fairness Act of 1999	S. 74	January 19, 1999	Tom Daschle (D-SD)	31	Died in Committee
107th Congress	Paycheck Fairness Act of 2001	H.R. 781	February 28, 2001	Rosa DeLauro (D-CT)	196	Died in Committee
107th Congress	Paycheck Fairness Act of 2001	S. 77	January 22, 2001	Tom Daschle (D-SD)	32	Died in Committee
108th Congress	Paycheck Fairness Act of 2003	H.R. 1688	April 4, 2003	Rosa DeLauro (D-CT)	116	Died in Committee
108th Congress	Paycheck Fairness Act of 2003	S. 76	January 7, 2003	Tom Daschle (D-SD)	20	Died in Committee
109th Congress	Paycheck Fairness Act of 2005	H.R. 1687	April 19, 2005	Rosa DeLauro (D-CT)	111	Died in Committee
109th Congress	Paycheck Fairness Act of 2005	S. 841	April 19, 2005	Hillary Clinton (D-NY)	18	Died in Committee
110th Congress	Paycheck Fairness Act of 2007	H.R. 1338	March 6, 2007	Rosa DeLauro (D-CT)	230	Passed in the House (247-178)
110th Congress	Paycheck Fairness Act of 2007	S. 766	March 6, 2007	Hillary Clinton (D-NY)	24	Died in Committee
111th Congress	Paycheck Fairness Act of 2009	H.R. 12	January 6, 2009	Rosa DeLauro (D-CT)	200	Passed in the House (256-163)
111th Congress	Paycheck Fairness Act of 2009	S. 182	January 8, 2009	Hillary Clinton (D-NY)	42	Died in Committee
111th Congress	Paycheck Fairness Act of 2009	S. 3772	September 13, 2010	Harry Reid (D-NV)	33	Cloture was not invoked (58-41)
112th Congress	Paycheck Fairness Act of 2011	H.R. 1519	April 13, 2011	Rosa DeLauro (D-CT)	197	Died in Committee
112th Congress	Paycheck Fairness Act of 2011	S. 797	April 12, 2011	Barbara Mikulski (D-MD)	35	Died in Committee
112th Congress	Paycheck Fairness Act of 2011	S. 3220	May 22, 2012	Barbara Mikulski (D-MD)	37	Cloture was not invoked (52-47)
113th Congress	Paycheck Fairness Act of 2013	H.R. 377	January 23, 2013	Rosa DeLauro (D-CT)	208	Died in Committee
113th Congress	Paycheck Fairness Act of 2013	S. 84	January 23, 2013	Barbara Mikulski (D-MD)	56	Died in Committee
113th Congress	Paycheck Fairness Act of 2013	S. 2199	April 1, 2014	Barbara Mikulski (D-MD)	42	Cloture was not invoked (53-44)
114th Congress	Paycheck Fairness Act of 2015	H.R. 1619	March 25, 2015	Rosa DeLauro (D-CT)	193	Died in Committee
114th Congress	Paycheck Fairness Act of 2015	S. 862	March 25, 2015	Barbara Mikulski (D-MD)	44	Died in Committee
115th Congress	Paycheck Fairness Act of 2017	H.R. 1869	April 7, 2017	Rosa DeLauro (D-CT)	201	Died in Committee
115th Congress	Paycheck Fairness Act of 2017	S. 819	April 4, 2017	Patty Murray (D-WA)	48	Died in Committee
116th Congress	Paycheck Fairness Act of 2019	H.R. 7	January 3, 2019	Rosa DeLauro (D-CT)	239	Passed in the House (242-187)
116th Congress	Paycheck Fairness Act of 2019	S. 270	March 28, 2019	Patty Murray (D-WA)	46	Died in Committee
117th Congress	Paycheck Fairness Act of 2021	H.R. 7	January 28, 2021	Rosa DeLauro (D-CT)	225	Passed in the House (217-210)
117th Congress	Paycheck Fairness Act of 2021	H.R. 7	January 28, 2021	Rosa DeLauro (D-CT)	225	Cloture was not invoked (49-50)
117th Congress	Paycheck Fairness Act of 2021	S.205	February 3, 2021	Patty Murray (D-WA)	49	Died in Committee
118th Congress	Paycheck Fairness Act of 2023	H.R. 17	March 10, 2023	Rosa DeLauro (D-CT)	216	Died in Committee
119th Congress	Paycheck Fairness Act of 2025	H.R. 17	March 25, 2025	Rosa DeLauro (D-CT)	218	Referred to committees of jurisdiction

The United States Senate failed to move the bill forward in November 2010. The 2010 bill had no Republican Party co-sponsors, though a group of four Republican senators had supported an earlier bill to address gender-based wage discrimination, including Susan Collins, Kay Bailey Hutchison, Lisa Murkowski, and Olympia Snowe. The 2010 Senate version of the bill had the support of the Obama administration and that of Democrats in the Senate. The American Civil Liberties Union supported S.182, citing the 2008 data from the United States Census Bureau that women's median annual earnings were 77.5% of the male median, African-American women's median annual earnings were 64% of the white male median, and Hispanic women's median annual earnings were 54% of the white male median. The American Association of University Women also supported the bill, citing the organization's 2007 research report, Behind the Pay Gap, which showed that women earn less than their male colleagues just one year out of college. The pay gap has widened 10 years after graduation.

President Barack Obama said in March 2011 that he would continue to fight for the goals in the Paycheck Fairness Act. The bill was reintroduced in both houses of Congress in April 2011.

On June 5, 2012, the bill fell short of the 60 votes necessary to override a filibuster and did not make it to the Senate floor for debate. The vote went along party lines, excluding a vote against by Democrat Harry Reid. (Senator Reid changes his vote as a procedural maneuver, which left Democrats the option to call up the bill again at a later time.)

On April 9, 2014, in another straight-party-line vote, the Paycheck Fairness Act (S. 2199; 113th Congress) was again blocked by a Republican filibuster in the U.S. Senate. Once again, Senator Reid changed his vote from support to oppose, as a tactical maneuver to keep the bill alive. The Paycheck Fairness Act was introduced into the United States Senate on April 1, 2014 by Senator Barbara Mikulski (D-MD). The bill was not referred to any committees. On April 9, 2014, a vote to end the debate on the bill failed in a 53-44 vote, when 60 votes were needed. All of the Republicans voted against ending the debate. The bill was introduced into the United States Senate during the 113th United States Congress. On April 9, 2014, it failed an important vote to end debate on the bill.

On June 10, 2021, the bill was filibustered on a 49-50 vote, with all Democrats voting for cloture and Republicans voting against cloture, with one Democrat not voting.

== Provisions ==
This summary is based largely on the summary provided by the Congressional Research Service, a public domain source.

The Paycheck Fairness Act would amend the portion of the Fair Labor Standards Act of 1938 (FLSA) known as the Equal Pay Act to revise remedies for, enforcement of, and exceptions to prohibitions against sex discrimination in the payment of wages.

The bill would revise the exception to the prohibition for a wage rate differential based on any other factor other than sex. It would limit such factors to bona fide factors, such as education, training, or experience.

The bill would state that the bona fide factor defense shall apply only if the employer demonstrates that such factor: (1) is not based upon or derived from a sex-based differential in compensation, (2) is job-related with respect to the position in question, and (3) is consistent with business necessity. Makes such defense inapplicable where the employee demonstrates that: (1) an alternative employment practice exists that would serve the same business purpose without producing such differential, and (2) the employer has refused to adopt such alternative practice.

The bill would revise the prohibition against employer retaliation for employee complaints. Prohibits retaliation for inquiring about, discussing, or disclosing the wages of the employee or another employee in response to a complaint or charge, or in furtherance of a sex discrimination investigation, proceeding, hearing, or action, or an investigation conducted by the employer.

The bill would make employers who violate sex discrimination prohibitions liable in a civil action for either compensatory or (except for the federal government) punitive damages.

The bill would state that any action brought to enforce the prohibition against sex discrimination may be maintained as a class action in which individuals may be joined as party plaintiffs without their written consent.

The bill would authorize the United States Secretary of Labor (Secretary) to seek additional compensatory or punitive damages in a sex discrimination action.

The bill would require the Equal Employment Opportunity Commission (EEOC) and the Office of Federal Contract Compliance Programs to train EEOC employees and affected individuals and entities on matters involving wage discrimination.

The bill would authorize the Secretary to make grants to eligible entities for negotiation skills training programs for girls and women. Directs the Secretary and the United States Secretary of Education to issue regulations or policy guidance to integrate such training into certain programs under their Departments.

The bill would direct the Secretary to conduct studies and provide information to employers, labor organizations, and the general public regarding the means available to eliminate pay disparities between men and women.

The bill would establish the Secretary of Labor's National Award for Pay Equity in the Workplace for an employer who has made a substantial effort to eliminate pay disparities between men and women.

The bill would amend the Civil Rights Act of 1964 to require the EEOC to collect from employers pay information data regarding the sex, race, and national origin of employees for use in the enforcement of federal laws prohibiting pay discrimination.

The bill would direct: (1) the Commissioner of Labor Statistics to continue to collect data on woman workers in the Current Employment Statistics survey, (2) the Office of Federal Contract Compliance Programs to use specified types of methods in investigating compensation discrimination and in enforcing pay equity, and (3) the Secretary to make accurate information on compensation discrimination readily available to the public.

The bill would direct the Secretary and the Commissioner [sic] of the EEOC jointly to develop technical assistance material to assist small businesses to comply with the requirements of this Act.

== Debate and discussion ==
Democrats said they intended to use the votes on this bill and the issue of equal pay as political issues in the 2014 midterm elections. Senator Charles Schumer (D-NY) told reporters that "pay equity, that's women, that's 53 percent of the vote." In 2012, Democrats did better than Republicans among women voters.

Senator Mikulski said that "it brings tears to my eyes to know women are working so hard and being paid less" and that "it makes me emotional when I hear that... I get angry, I get outraged and I get volcanic."

Republicans gave several different reasons for voting against ending debate. One reason for their opposition, given by Senators Susan Collins (R-ME) and Kelly Ayotte (R-NH), was that Majority Leader Harry Reid had refused to allow votes on any of the amendments that Republicans had suggested for the bill. Republicans also objected because it would strongly benefit trial lawyers and would "remove caps on punitive damages against businesses found guilty of discrimination". Minority Leader Mitch McConnell (R-KY) said that the legislation would "line the pockets of trial lawyers" not help women.

=== Justification ===
The National Women's Law Center makes the following case for the Paycheck Fairness Act:

- Like Title VII, the Paycheck Fairness Act will direct courts to scrutinize seemingly neutral pay practices to determine whether they actually serve a legitimate business purpose and whether there are comparable alternatives that will not result in gender-based pay disparities.
- First, the Act requires that the "factor other than sex" defense be based on a bona fide factor, such as education, training, or experience, that is not based upon or derived from a sex-based differential.
- Second, the "factor other than sex" must be job-related to the position in question.
- Third, the "factor other than sex" must be consistent with business necessity.
- In addition, the defense will not apply if the employee can demonstrate that an alternative employment practice exists that would serve the same business purpose without producing a pay differential and the employer has refused to adopt the alternative.
- Requiring employers to justify any decision not to pay workers equal wages for doing substantially equal work is reasonable in light of the Equal Pay Act's goal to uncover discrimination and the unspecific nature of the "factor other than sex" defense. Moreover, the Paycheck Fairness Act does not alter the safeguards embedded in the Equal Pay Act that ensure that employers have appropriate discretion in setting compensation in nondiscriminatory ways.

For example:

- The Paycheck Fairness Act, like the Equal Pay Act, still requires employees to meet an exceptionally high burden before an employer need even offer an affirmative defense. An Equal Pay Act plaintiff must identify a comparable male employee who makes more money for performing equal work, requiring equal skill, effort, and responsibility under similar working conditions. The Paycheck Fairness Act does not alter the other three of the four affirmative defenses available to employers.Thus, employers may still pay different wages to male and female employees performing equal work if the pay decision is based on merit, seniority, or quantity or quality of production. The Paycheck Fairness Act allows employers to raise the business necessity defense, which is a concept imported from Title VII and familiar to employers and courts.
- Some courts have interpreted the "factor other than sex" defense under the Equal Pay Act to permit an employer assert literally any factor other than sex so long as the plaintiff cannot demonstrate that it is pretextual. As one court has noted, requiring that the "factor other than sex" defense rely upon a legitimate business reason prevents employers "from relying on a compensation differential that is merely a pretext for sex discrimination—e.g., determining salaries on the basis of an employee's height or weight, when those factors have no relevance to the job at issue." The Paycheck Fairness Act is intended to provide a means to assess whether employers are setting wages based on an employee's sex or on legitimate rationales tethered to business needs and the particular job in question.

After conducting a study of 680,000 EEOC discrimination complaints that found 63% of filers later lost their jobs, University of Massachusetts Amherst scholars Professor Donald Tomaskovic-Devey and doctoral students Carly McCann and J.D. Swerzenski opined that "passage of [the Paycheck Fairness Act] would be a good step to encourage more workers to report discrimination," but called for broader discrimination protections and stronger violation penalties.

=== Criticism ===
A 2009 CONSAD Research Corporation study prepared for the US Department of Labor cautioned against misinterpretation of census and other wage data, suggesting that the wage gap between the sexes was not due to systematic discrimination:

Although additional research in this area is clearly needed, this study leads to the unambiguous conclusion that the differences in the compensation of men and women are the result of a multitude of factors and that the raw wage gap should not be used as the basis to justify corrective action. Indeed, there may be nothing to correct. The differences in raw wages may be almost entirely the result of the individual choices being made by both male and female workers.

Christina Hoff Sommers, a resident scholar at the American Enterprise Institute, criticized the proposed law, citing the study.

Columnist Daniel Fisher criticized the legislation in Forbes magazine, pointing out that eliminating the "reason other than sex" defense used by employers under existing law would mean that wage differences based on an individual's salary history and negotiating skills would be treated as evidence of discrimination, even if the employer's actions were not based on gender. According to Fisher, the act "eliminates the 'reason other than sex' defense and substitutes instead a requirement that the employer prove that its pay practices are divorced from any discrimination in its workplace or at the employee's prior workplace, that the pay practice is job related, and that it is consistent with "business necessity".

== See also ==
- US labor law
- List of bills in the 113th United States Congress
