= Textile Workers Union of America v. Darlington Manufacturing Co Inc =

Textile Workers Union of America v Darlington Manufacturing Co Inc
- Court: US Supreme Court
- Citation: 380 US 263 (1965)

Keywords
- Right to organize

T extile Workers Union of America v Darlington Manufacturing Co Inc 380 US 263 (1965) is a US labor law case, concerning the right to organize.

U. S. Supreme Court

Textile Workers Union v. Darlington Mfg. Co., 380 U.S. 263 (1965)

Textile Workers Union of America v. Darlington Manufacturing Co.

No. 37

Argued December 9–10, 1964

Decided March 29, 1965*

380 U.S. 263

== Syllabus ==
A majority of the stock of Darlington Manufacturing Company, a textile mill, was owned by Deering Milliken, a marketing corporation, and the National Labor Relations Board found that the latter company was, in turn, controlled by Roger Milliken, Darlington's president, and members of his family. An organizational campaign by petitioner union at Darlington, although strongly resisted by the company, including threats to close the mill, was successful. Shortly thereafter, the company was liquidated, the plant closed, and the equipment sold. The National Labor Relations Board found that the closing was due to Roger Milliken's anti-union animus, a violation of § 8(a)(3) of the National Labor Relations Act; that Darlington was part, of a single integrated employer group controlled by the Milliken family through Deering Milliken, operating 17 textile companies with 27 mills; and, alternatively, since Darlington was part of the integrated enterprise, Deering Milliken violated the Act by closing part of its business for a discriminatory purpose. The Court of Appeals held that, even assuming Deering Milliken was a single employer, it had the right to terminate all or part of its business regardless of anti-union motives.

== Held ==
1. It is not an unfair labor practice for an employer to close his entire business, even if the closing is due to anti-union animus. Pp. 380 U. S. 269-274.

2. Closing part of a business is an unfair labor practice under § 8(a)(3) of the Act if the purpose is to discourage unionism in any of the employer's remaining plants and if the employer may reasonably have foreseen such effect. Pp. 380 U. S. 274-275. Page 380 U. S. 264.

3. If those exercising control over a plant that is being closed for anti-union reasons have an interest in another business, whether or not affiliated with or in the same line of commerce as the closed plant, of sufficient substantiality to promise a benefit from nonunionization of that business, act to close their plant for that purpose, and have a relationship to the other business which makes it probable that its employees will fear closing down if organizational activities are continued, an unfair labor practice has been made out. Pp. 380 U. S. 275-276.

4. Since no findings were made by the Board as to the purpose and effect of the Darlington closing with respect to the employees of the other plants in the Deering Milliken group, the judgments are vacated and the cases remanded to permit such findings to be made. Pp. 380 U. S. 276-277.

325 F.2d 82, judgments vacated and remanded.

Page 380 U. S. 265

== See also ==
- US labor law
