= Detroit Edison Co v. NLRB =

Law case

Detroit Edison Co v NLRB
- Court: US Supreme Court
- Citation: 440 US 301 (1979)

Keywords
- Right to organize

Detroit Edison Co v NLRB, 440 US 301 (1979) is a US labor law case, concerning the right to organize, and balancing interests between the employer and the labor union.

== Facts ==
The union claimed that it had the right, for collective bargaining, to information about the employer's testing program. It had a test battery the employer used, and scores of individual employees. There was a grievance over whether an employer breached a seniority clause in a collective agreement, hiring outside instead of internal promotions.

== Judgment ==
The Supreme Court, 5 to 4, struck down the National Labor Relations Board order giving the union the access to data. Providing individual test scores went too far, and should only be available with individual employee consent.

Stevens, White, Brennan, Marshall J dissented.

== Legacy ==
Detroit Edison is cited by the NLRB for the proposition that it set the "standard for balancing disclosure of information against confidentiality and privacy interests."

== See also ==
- US labor law
