= John Green (disambiguation) =

John Green (born 1977) is an American author and YouTube content creator.

John or Johnny Green may also refer to:

== Arts ==
- John Green (painter) (died 1802), American-born Bermudian painter
- Johnny Green (1908–1989), American composer and inductee of the Songwriters Hall of Fame
- John Willison Green (1927–2016), Canadian journalist and prominent "Bigfoot" researcher
- John M. Green (born 1953), Australian author and publisher
- John Green (producer) (born 1966/7), American television producer for ABC News
- John Patrick Green, American comic artist and writer

== Military ==
- John Green (Medal of Honor) (1825–1908), German-born American soldier and recipient of the Medal of Honor
- Sir John Green (Royal Navy officer) (1866–1948), British admiral
- John Leslie Green (1888–1916), English Victoria Cross recipient
- John Francis Green (1946–1975), Irish Provisional Irish Republican Army member
- John Green (priest) (born 1953), British Chaplain of the Fleet and Director General, Naval Chaplaincy Service

== Politics and public service ==
- John Green (speaker) (1400–1473), speaker of the House of Commons of England
- John W. Green (Virginia politician) (1781–1834), American judge and politician
- John Green (judge) (1807–1887), American judge and Indiana state senator
- John Green (Wisconsin politician) (1834–1877), American military officer and Wisconsin state assemblyman
- John Patterson Green (1845–1940), American attorney, politician, public servant and writer
- John Greene (Kilkenny MP) (died 1883), Irish Member of Parliament in the British House of Commons, sometimes referred to as John Green
- John Aloysius Green (1844–1920), American mine owner and Iowa state senator
- John W. Green (Missouri politician) (fl. 1948–1954), member of the Missouri House of Representatives
- John Green (Australian politician) (1945–2020), Tasmanian politician
- John Green (Idaho politician) (born 1959), American attorney, former politician, and former police officer

== Sports ==
=== Association football (soccer) ===
- John Green (footballer, born 1894) (1894–1966), English footballer
- John Green (footballer, born 1896) (1896–1927), English footballer
- John Green (footballer, born 1939) (1939–2010), English football midfielder for Tranmere, Blackpool, Port Vale and Vancouver Royals
- John Green (footballer, born 1958) (born 1958), English football defender for Rotherham, Scunthorpe and Darlington

=== Cricket ===
- John Green (Middlesex cricketer) (1896–1960), English cricketer
- John Green (Warwickshire cricketer) (1908–1987), English cricketer
- John Green (Trinidadian cricketer) (1918–?), Trinidadian cricketer

=== Gridiron football ===
- John Green (defensive end) (1921–1989), American football player for the Philadelphia Eagles of the NFL
- John Green (guard) (1924–1981), American football player and coach, College Football Hall of Fame inductee
- Johnny Green (gridiron football) (1937–2019), American football quarterback in the United States and Canada

=== Other sports ===
- John Green (rugby union) (1881–1968), England rugby union international
- John Green (Australian footballer) (1885–1949), Australian rules footballer
- John Green (basketball) (born 1940), American college basketball player for UCLA
- Johnny Green (basketball) (1933–2023), American professional basketball player in the NBA

== Other people ==
- John Henry Green (1636–1685), English physician and philanthropist
- John Green (bishop) (1706–1779), British clergyman and academic
- John Green (1787–1852), English architect and one half of the father-and-son architectural team
- John Cleve Green (1800–1875), China merchant
- John Richard Green (1837–1883), English historian
- John Green (agriculturalist) (1862–1953), British agriculturalist
- John Green (educationalist) (1867–1922), British educationalist and professor of education
- John Frederick Norman Green (1873–1949), English geologist
- John Green (unionist) (1896–1957), Scottish-born American labor union leader
- John L. Green Jr. (1929–2021), American academic administrator
- John Green (botanist) (born 1930), Australian botanist
- John S. A. Green (1931–2012), British meteorologist
- John Green (headmaster) (born 1967), British rugby player and schoolmaster
- John C. Green, American academic and director of the Ray C. Bliss Institute of Applied Politics
- John Green (sociologist), American sociologist

== Other ==
- "John Deere Green", a song from the 1993 album Honky Tonk Attitude by American country-music singer Joe Diffie
- St. John Green, a psychedelic rock band with one self-titled LP from 1968

== See also ==
- Jack Green (disambiguation)
- John Greene (disambiguation)
- Jonathan Green (disambiguation)
- John Greer (disambiguation)
