= List of University of Sheffield people =

This list of University of Sheffield people is a selected list of notable past staff and students of the University of Sheffield.

== Notable alumni ==
=== Academics ===
- Syed I. Ahson, computer science professor, education management professional, researcher, and author
- Percy Anstey, principal of Sydenham College of Commerce and Economics in Mumbai (1914-1920)
- Stephen Billings (1951–2022), University Dept of Automatic Control and Systems Engineering professor
- Freda Briggs, emeritus Professor, University of South Australia, child protection expert
- Thom Brooks, Dean, Durham Law School & Professor of Law and Government Durham University (PhD Philosophy 2004)
- Alasdair Cochrane, Professor of Political Theory, University of Sheffield (BA Politics 2000)
- Sir Paul Curran, President, City, University of London (BSc Geography 1976)
- Laura Dean, President-Elect of the British Psychological Society
- Roma Gill, Reader in English Literature (1963-1984)
- Phineas Makhurane, Vice-Chancellor, National University of Science and Technology, Zimbabwe
- Paddy Nixon, Vice-Chancellor & President, Ulster University (PhD 1994)
- Stuart Palmer, Deputy Vice-Chancellor, University of Warwick
- Michael Sterling, Vice-Chancellor, University of Birmingham (BEng Electronic and Electrical Engineering 1967, PhD 1971)
- Martin Stephen, High Master, St Paul's School (PhD)
- John Sutton, Sir John Hicks Professor of Economics, London School of Economics
- Richard Wilding, Professor of Supply Chain Strategy, Cranfield University and Chairman of the Chartered Institute of Logistics & Transport (BSc (Tech) Material Science 1987)

=== Business people ===
- Richard Cousins, CEO of Compass Group world's largest foodservice company
- Gareth Davis, Chairman of M&C Saatchi and former CEO of Imperial Brands
- Hussain Dawood, Chairman of Dawood Hercules Corporation Limited, Engro Corporation Limited
- John Devaney, chairman, Marconi PLC
- Jeremy Grantham, co-founder of GMO asset management
- Param Singh, Property Developer, Entrepreneur
- Penny Hughes, former president of Coca-Cola Enterprises (UK) (BSc (Hons) Chemistry)
- Sir Peter Middleton, Camelot Barclays Chairman
- Edward H. Ntalami, Chief Executive, Capital Markets Authority, Kenya
- Muyiwa Oki, president of the Royal Institute of British Architects (2023-2025)
- Jim O'Neill, Baron O'Neill of Gatley, former head of global economic research, Goldman Sachs
- Richard Simmons, CEO Commission for Architecture and the Built Environment
- Naser Taher, founder of MultiBank Group
- Wei Yang, Founder of Wei Yang & Partner, Town Planner and Urban Designer (MSc 2001, PhD 2005)

=== Lawyers ===
- David Childs, former Managing Partner of Clifford Chance
- Mohammad Qasim Hashimzai, Deputy Minister of Justice, Afghanistan
- Md. Muzammel Hossain, Chief Justice of Bangladesh
- Henry M. Joko-Smart, former Sierra Leonean Supreme Court Justice
- Sir Maurice Kay Lord Justice of Appeal
- Sir Paul Kennedy, Lord Justice of Appeal, Interception of Communications Commissioner
- Sir Nigel Knowles, CEO of the Anglo-American law firm DLA Piper
- Dame Julia Macur, Lord Justice of Appeal
- Sir Alistair MacDuff, High Court of Justice of England and Wales
- Dame Anne Rafferty, Lord Justice of Appeal
- Tommy Sihotang, Indonesian Lawyer
- Arifin Zakaria, Chief Justice of Malaysia

In November 2013, for the first time in history, the Court of Appeal had an all-Sheffield alumni bench. The judges sitting were Lord Justice Maurice Kay (LLB Law, 1964; PhD Law, 1971 and Hon LLD, 2003), Lady Justice Anne Rafferty (LLB Law, 1971 and Hon LLD, 2005) and Lady Justice Julia Macur (LLB Law, 1978). This event was also extremely significant because outside Oxford and Cambridge, Sheffield now has the record for the highest number of graduates appointed to the bench above any other UK University.

=== Authors ===
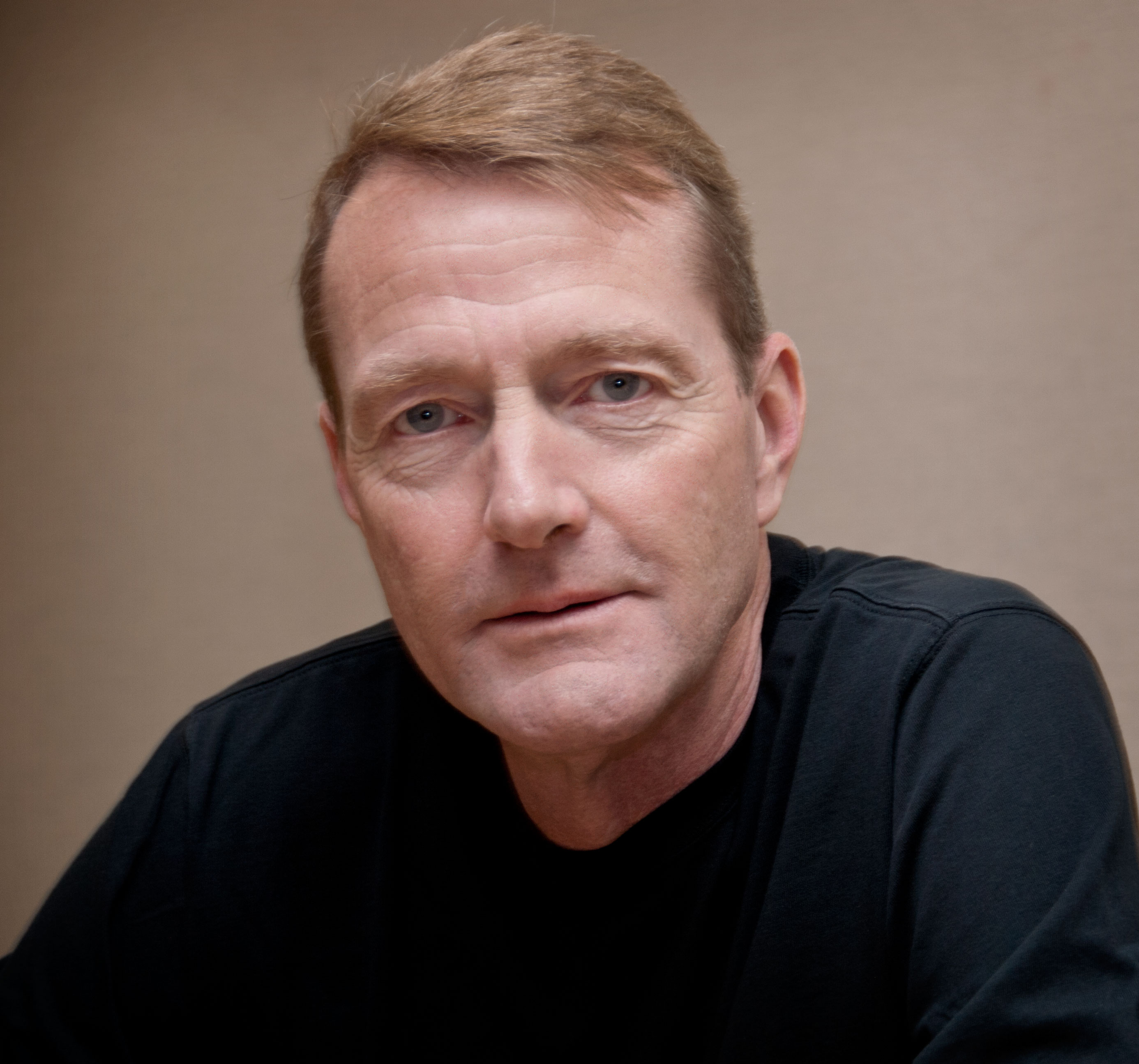
Lee Child, author (LLB)

- Lindsay Ashford, author
- Lee Child, novelist (LLB)
- Sophie Deen, children's book author
- Katie B. Edwards (alumni and former faculty 2012–2020)
- Gregory Evans, dramatist
- Nicci Gerrard, author
- Joanne Harris, author (later became faculty)
- Nick Hurst, author
- Brooke Magnanti, a.k.a. "Belle de Jour", author
- Hilary Mantel, author (LLB), two times Booker Prize winner
- Jack Rosenthal, playwright
- John Thompson (1938–1976), Canadian poet

=== Media and artists ===
- Van Badham, columnist for The Guardian, playwright
- Carol Barnes, ITN Newsreader
- Douglas Bostock, conductor
- Lucie Cave, journalist, editor of Heat magazine
- Munya Chawawa, comedian
- Peter Cheeseman, theatre director, leading pioneer of theatre-in-the-round and documentary drama
- Chris Chibnall, television screenwriter and producer
- Stephen Daldry, stage and film director
- Martin Fry, lead singer of ABC
- Brian Glover, actor
- Ian Hallard, actor
- Eddie Izzard, comedian
- Laura Kay, writer
- Tim Key, comedian, poet, recipient of the Edinburgh Comedy Award 2009
- Glenn Moore, comedian
- Sid Lowe, journalist and columnist for The Guardian
- Paul Mason, journalist and former economics editor for the BBC's Newsnight
- John O'Leary, Times Higher Education Supplement editor
- Lily Phillips, pornographic film actress
- Rachel Shelley, actress (BA (Hons) English and Drama)
- Linda Smith, comedian and head of the British Humanist Association
- Dan Walker, journalist and television presenter
- Andrew Wilson, Sky News presenter and former foreign correspondent
- Frank Worrall, The Sun, author and journalist
- Selina Thompson, performance artist and playwright

=== Pioneers ===
- Mary Gell, medical missionary (Bachelor of Surgery, 1922)
- Amy Johnson, pilot (BA (Hons) Economics, 1926)
- Roy Koerner, Polar Explorer
- Eric Moxey, bomb disposal expert and inventor of the Fuze Extractor
- Helen Sharman, first British astronaut (BSc (Hons) Chemistry, 1984)

=== Politicians ===
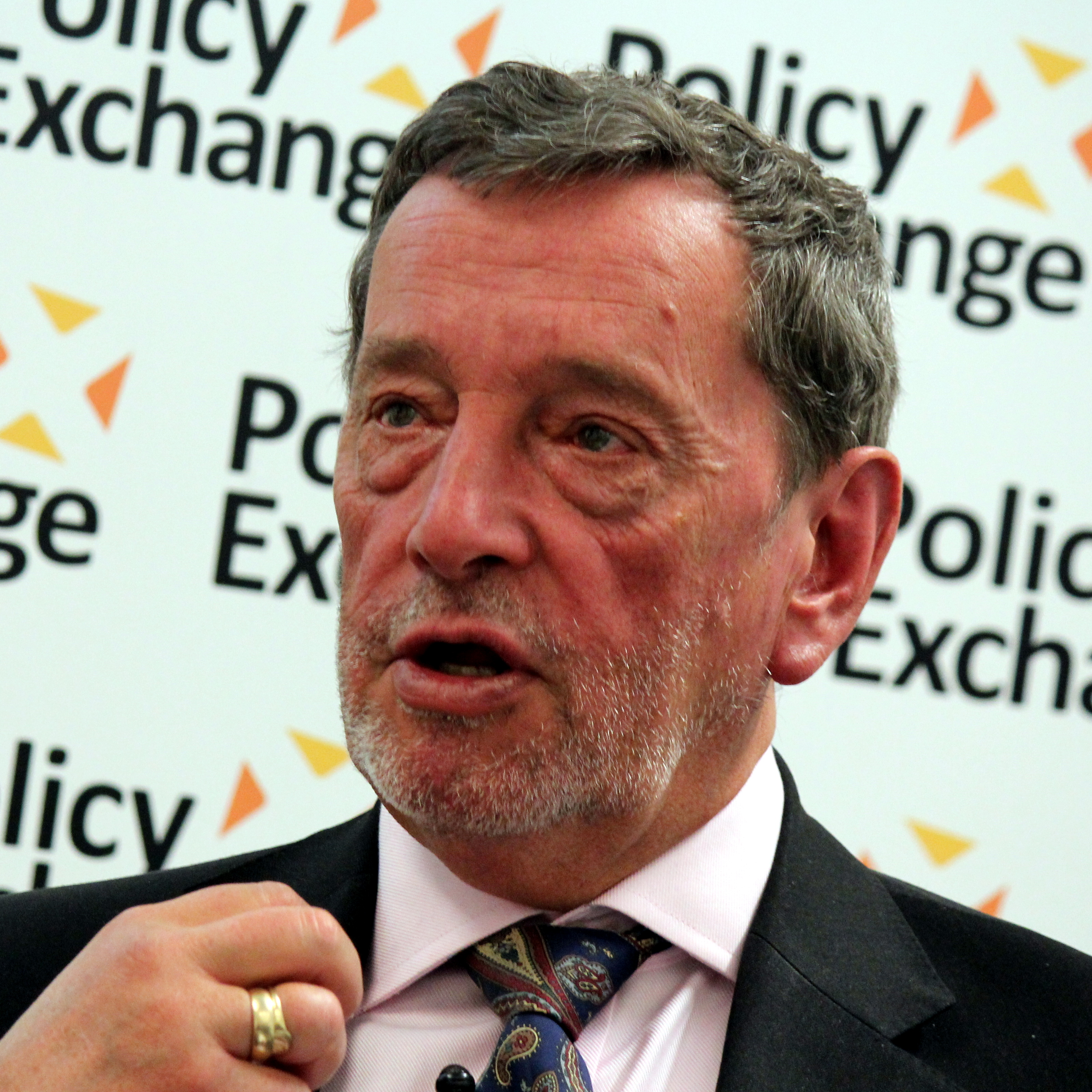
David Blunkett

- Jean-Paul Adam, Minister for Foreign Affairs (Seychelles)
- Peter Adams, Canadian Liberal MP
- Jonathan Arnott, UK Independence Party MEP
- Kevin Barron, Labour MP
- Gerry Bermingham, Labour MP
- Sir Jake Berry, Conservative MP
- Olivia Blake, Labour MP for Sheffield Hallam
- David Blunkett, MP for Sheffield Brightside and former Home Secretary
- Nurettin Canikli, Turkish First Deputy Prime Minister in Binali Yıldırım's Cabinet, former Minister for Customs and Trade
- Sarah Champion Labour MP
- David Clark, Baron Clark of Windermere, Labour peer
- Serge Joyal, Canadian Senator
- Judith Kirton-Darling, Labour MEP
- Nicholas Liverpool, 6th President of Dominica
- Justin Madders, Labour MP
- Anne Main, Conservative MP for St Albans
- Brian Millard, leader of Stockport Metropolitan Borough Council from 2005 to 2007
- Shaffaq Mohammed, Liberal Democrat MEP
- Hugo Antonio Laviada Molina, Mexican politician
- Fenella Mukangara, Minister of Information, Culture and Sports, Tanzania
- Philip Norton, Baron Norton of Louth, Conservative peer & academic
- Steve Reed, Labour MP, Secretary of State for Housing, Communities and Local Government
- Onkar Sahota, Labour London Assembly Member for Ealing and Hillingdon
- Kadi Sesay, Minister of Trade and Industry, Sierre Leone
- Graham Stringer, Labour MP
- Yb Dato' Rashid bin Hasnon, Deputy Chief Minister of Penang, Malaysia PKR MLA
- Sir Chung Sze-yuen, former Convenor of the Executive Council of Hong Kong
- Montfort Tadier, Jersey Politician
- Ann Taylor, Baroness Taylor of Bolton, Labour MP for Bolton West and Dewsbury, subsequently a life peer and minister at the Ministry of Defence
- Nick Timothy, Downing Street Chief of Staff
- Eric Graham Varley, former Labour Cabinet minister
- Caroline Voaden, Liberal Democrat MEP
- Sir Frederick Archibald Warner, Conservative MEP and diplomat
- Roger Evans, Baron Evans of Guisborough, Conservative Life peer, former Statutory Deputy Mayor of London.

=== Public servants ===
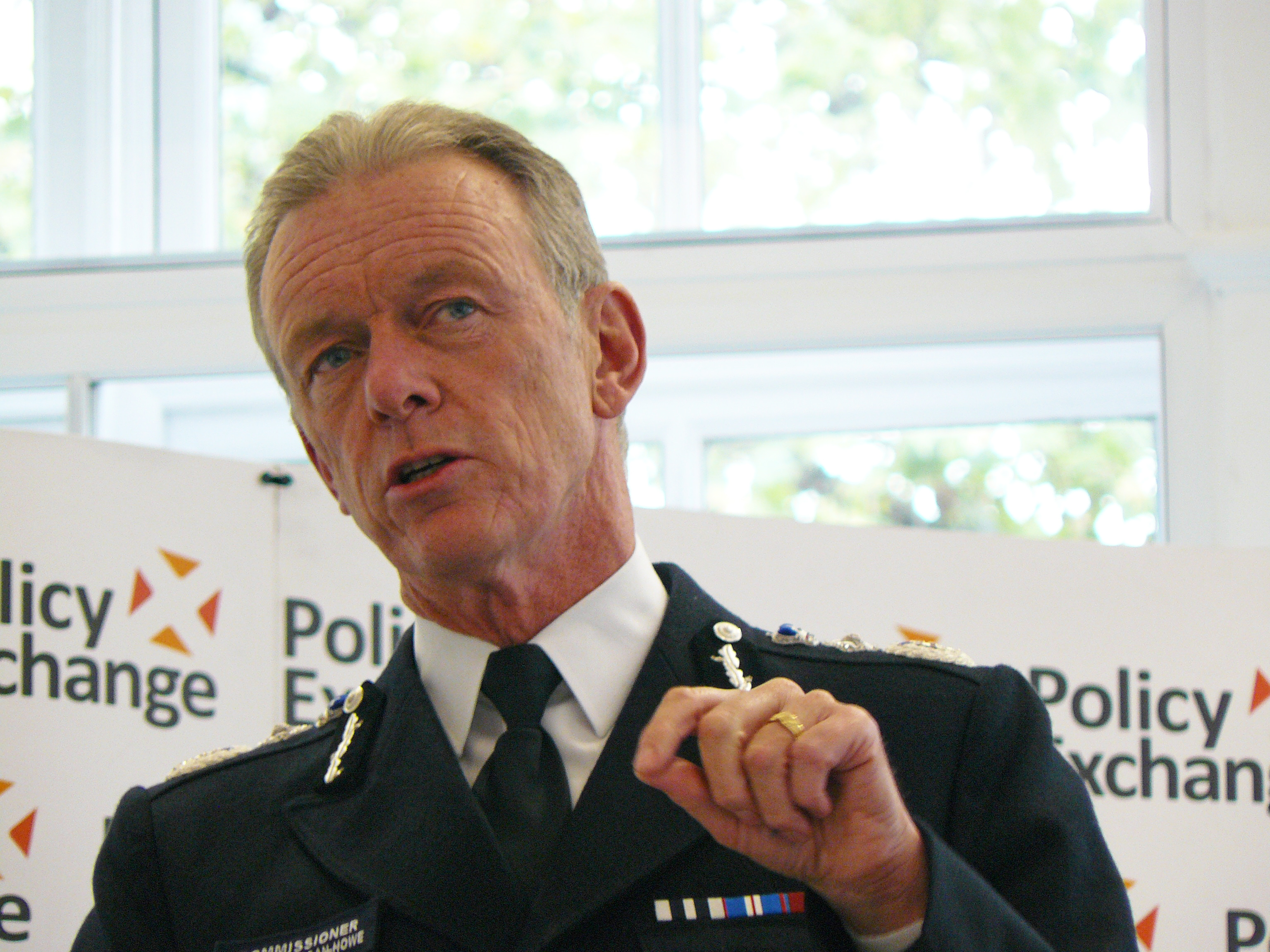
The Lord Hogan-Howe

- Khalid S. Al-Ageel, General Secretary of the High Commission for Industrial Security, Saudi Arabia
- Maggie Atkinson, Children's Commissioner for England
- Sir Michael Carlisle, Senior Civil Servant
- Lim Neo Chian, former Chief of Singapore Army
- Major-General Andrew Farquhar, British Army
- Sir Vincent Fean, British diplomat
- Andy Haldane, Chief Economist at the Bank of England
- Bernard Hogan-Howe, Baron Hogan-Howe, Commissioner, London's Metropolitan Police Service
- Sir Ken Jones, Deputy Commissioner of Victoria Police, Chief Constable, Sussex Police
- Vanessa Lawrence, Ordnance Survey Director-General
- Vice-Admiral Sir Charles Montgomery, Director General, UK Border Force
- Air Chief Marshal Stuart Peach, Baron Peach, Chief of the Defence Staff, UK
- Crispian Strachan, Chief Constable of Northumbria Police
- Benjamin Wegg-Prosser, consultant and political adviser
- Phil Wheatley, Director-General HM Prison Service

=== Clergy ===
- Nicholas Bundock, Bishop of Glasgow and Galloway
- Wesley Carr, Dean of Westminster Abbey
- John Chew, Bishop of Singapore
- Glenn Davies, Archbishop of Sydney
- Jan McFarlane, Bishop of Repton
- Tony Nichols, Bishop of North West Australia
- John Parkes, Bishop of Wangaratta
- Martyn Percy, Dean of Christ Church, Oxford
- Henry Scriven, Bishop of Pittsburgh
- Stephen Smyth, General Secretary of Action of Churches Together in Scotland (2007–2014)
- Martyn Snow, Bishop of Leicester
- Alan Winton, Bishop of Thetford

=== Scientists ===
- Sir Donald Bailey, civil engineer and inventor of the Bailey bridge
- Anna Batchelor, first woman Dean of the Faculty of Intensive Care Medicine and past president, Intensive Care Society (MBBS 1980)
- Sir Harold Kroto, Nobel Prize-winning chemist (BSc (Hons) Chemistry, 1961; PhD, 1961–1964)
- Sir Hans Kornberg, biochemist, Master of Christ's College Cambridge
- Sir Richard Roberts, Nobel Prize-winning geneticist (BSc (Hons) Chemistry, 1965; PhD, 1968)
- Olive Scott, paediatric cardiologist (MBBS 1948; MD 1957)

=== Sports people ===
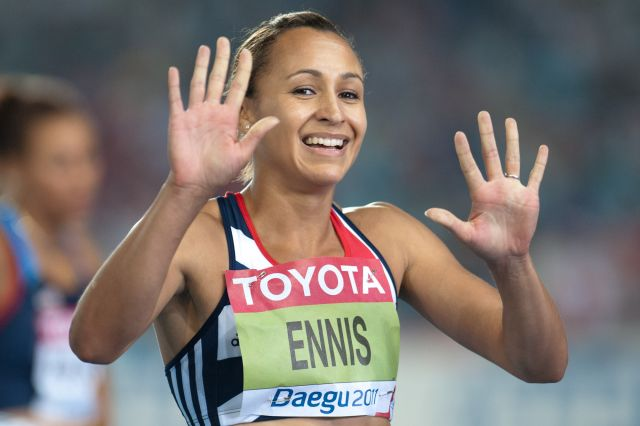
Jessica Ennis, Olympic Gold medallist, heptathlete

- Lizzy Banks, professional cyclist
- Nick Beighton, Paralympic Bronze Medallist 2016, Men's KL2 canoe sprint
- Herbert Chapman, footballer and manager
- Zara Dampney, beach volleyball player
- David Davies, The Football Association Chief Executive
- Jessica Ennis, Olympic Gold Medallist, heptathlete
- Catherine Faux, triathlete
- Kristian Jones and Jamie Stevenson, orienteers with medals at world championships
- Tony Miles, the United Kingdom's first chess grand master
- Jade Packer, gold medal holding bodybuilder, sports model, former sprinter and television personality
- Bryony Page, Olympic Silver Medallist 2016, trampolining
- Paul Ramsden, first alpinist to win the Piolet d'Or five times
- C. R. Roberts, athlete
- Tim Robinson, England International Cricketer
- Hollie Pearne-Webb, Olympic Gold Medallist 2016, women's hockey
- David Wetherall, footballer
- David Wetherill, Paralympic table tennis player

== Notable academics ==
- Francis Berry, poet and literary critic
- Marianne Bielschowsky, biochemist
- Norman Blake, Middle English and Early Modern English language and literature scholar
- Peter Blundell Jones, professor in architecture
- Anthony Bottoms, professor of criminology
- Angela Carter, author (1976–1978)
- Henry Coward, conductor
- Paul Dolan, professor of behavioural science
- Danny Dorling, former professor of geography
- Bernard Crick, former professor of politics
- Graeme Davies, vice-chancellor University of London
- Charles Eliot, diplomat, Vice-Chancellor
- Lilian Edwards, Professor of Internet Law
- William Empson, poet (The School of English names its facilities after him)
- Pamela Enderby, professor of community rehabilitation
- Katie B. Edwards, author (2012–2020; was also a student)
- Howard Florey, Nobel Prize winner and professor of pathology
- Andrew Gamble, political economist and professor of politics
- John Green, former professor of education
- Joanne Harris, author (2000; was also a student)
- Peter Hill, well-known pianist and expert on the works of Olivier Messiaen
- Sir Robert Honeycombe, metallurgist
- R. J. Hopper, professor of ancient history
- David Hughes, astronomer, Asteroid 4205 is named in his honour.
- Dame Betty Kershaw, Dean of the School of Nursing
- Sir Ian Kershaw, historian
- Sir Hans Krebs, Nobel Prize-winning biochemist (1935–1954)
- Stephen Laurence, philosopher and cognitive scientist
- Sir Colin Lucas, historian, chair of the board of the British Library
- Peter Maitlis, Professor of Inorganic Chemistry
- David Marquand, politician
- Edward Mellanby, Professor of Pharmacology, discoverer of Vitamin D
- Brian Robert Morris, Professor of English
- Douglas Northcott, Professor of Mathematics
- George Porter, Nobel Prize-winning chemist (1955–1966)
- Sir David Read, emeritus Professor of Plant Science
- Colin Renfrew, archaeologist
- Sir Gareth Roberts, Vice-Chancellor
- Piers Robinson, professor of politics, society and political journalism
- William Sarjeant, geologist
- Joanna Shapland, Edward Bramley Professor of Criminal Justice
- Noel Sharkey, broadcaster, Professor of Artificial Intelligence and Robotics, Professor of Public Engagement
- Susan Sherratt, archaeologist of Bronze Age Greece, Cyprus, and the Eastern Mediterranean
- Michael Siva-Jothy, entomologist
- Sir Fraser Stoddart, chemist
- Stephen Stich, Honorary Professor of Philosophy
- Charles J. M. Stirling, Professor of Chemistry
- Digby Tantam, British psychiatrist and Professor of Psychotherapy
- Simon Tavaré, computational biologist and statistician, founding director of the Irving Institute for Cancer Dynamics
- Grenville Turner, Professor of Physics
- W. E. S. Turner (1881–1963), Professor of Glass Technology and founder of the museum which bears his name
- Sir James Underwood, Joseph Hunter Professor of Pathology and Dean of the Faculty of Medicine
- Yorick Wilks, Professor of Artificial Intelligence
- Peter Willett, Professor of Information Science
- Sir Michael Woodruff, transplant surgeon
- Shirley Wray, neuro-ophthalmologist and Professor at Harvard Medical School
