= List of people from Decatur, Illinois =

The following list includes notable people who were born or have lived in Decatur, Illinois. For a similar list organized alphabetically by last name, see the category page People from Decatur, Illinois.

== Authors and academics ==
Name	Image	Birth	Death	Known for	Association	Reference
John Dossey		Mar 15, 1944	Feb 5, 2024	Mathematician	Born in Decatur	
Karl August Folkers		Sep 1, 1906	Dec 7, 1991	Biochemist known for work on the structure of coenzyme Q_{10}	Born in Decatur	
Charles J. Givens		Feb 5, 1941	Jul 12, 1998	Financial lecturer and author	Born in Decatur	
John J. Green				Sociologist	Born in Decatur	
Nathan H. Lents		Sep 22, 1978		Biologist, professor, and author	Born in Decatur	
James W. Loewen		Feb 6, 1942	Aug 19, 2021	Author, historian, and sociology professor	Born in Decatur	
Andrew R. Neureuther		Jul 30, 1941	Sep 9, 2025	Electrical engineer	Born in Decatur	
Richard Peck		Apr 10, 1934	May 24, 2018	Children's author; 2001 Newbery Medal winner	Born in Decatur	
Marvin A. Sweeney		Jul 4, 1953		Author, biblical scholar, and professor	Grew up in Decatur	
Alice S. Tyler		Apr 27, 1859	Apr 18, 1944	Librarian, president of American Library Association 1920–1921	Born in Decatur; Buried in Decatur (Greenwood Cemetery)	

== Commerce ==
Name	Image	Birth	Death	Known for	Association	Reference
Dwayne Andreas		Mar 4, 1918	Nov 16, 2016	Former CEO and chairman of Archer Daniels Midland ADM	Lived in Decatur; Died in Decatur	
James Millikin		Aug 2, 1827	Mar 2, 1909	Founder of Millikin National Bank and Millikin University	Lived in Decatur; Buried in Decatur (Greenwood Cemetery)	

== Crime ==
Name	Image	Birth	Death	Known for	Association	Reference
Charles E. Boles (a.k.a. Black Bart)		1829	1888	Western outlaw	Lived in Decatur	

== Media and arts ==
Name	Image	Birth	Death	Known for	Association	Reference
Chris Berry		Aug 11, 1960		Broadcasting journalist and management	Born in Decatur	
Jenny Lou Carson		Jan 13, 1915	Dec 16, 1978	Country singer-songwriter inducted in Nashville Songwriters Hall of Fame	Born in Decatur	
June Christy		Nov 20, 1925	Jun 21, 1990	Jazz singer	Grew up in Decatur	
Loren Coleman		Jul 12, 1947		Author, cryptozoologist, radio and television personality	Grew up in Decatur	
Dale Connelly		Oct 4, 1955		Host of Minnesota Public Radio's Radio Heartland		
Brian Culbertson		Jan 12, 1973		Jazz musician	Born in Decatur	
Annamary Dickey		Apr 11, 1911	June 1, 1999	Soprano at the Metropolitan Opera and star of Broadway musicals	Born in Decatur	
John Doe		Feb 25, 1954		Founder of L.A. punk band X	Born in Decatur	
Thelma Given		Mar 9, 1896	Dec 25, 1977	Concert pianist	Raised in Decatur	
Chad Gray		Oct 16, 1971		Singer of alternative metal band Mudvayne	Born in Latham	
Jonathan Hammond				Filmmaker	Grew up in Decatur	
Tiny Hill		July 19, 1906	Dec 13, 1971	Big band leader	Briefly lived in Decatur	
Steve Hunter		Jun 14, 1948		Guitarist with Mitch Ryder, Lou Reed, Alice Cooper, and Peter Gabriel	Born in Decatur	
Alison Krauss		Jul 23, 1971		Country/bluegrass singer and songwriter; most-awarded singer in history of Grammy Awards	Born in Decatur	
RonReaco Lee		Aug 27, 1977		Actor (The Good Guys, Let's Stay Together)	Born in Decatur	
Judy Martin		Jul 23, 1917	Nov 17, 1951	Country and gospel singer; wife of Red Foley	Born in Decatur	
Nan Martin		Jul 15, 1927	Mar 4, 2010	Actress (Mr. Sunshine, The Thorn Birds, Santa Barbara, The Drew Carey Show)	Born in Decatur	
Stephen Mason		Jul 8, 1975		Guitar player for Jars of Clay	Grew up in Decatur	
Boots Randolph		Jun 3, 1927	Jul 3, 2007	Jazz saxophonist; composer of Yakety Sax	Played with Dink Welch's Kopy Kats in Decatur (1948 to 1954)	
Nala Ray		Dec 3, 1997		Social media influencer	Born in Decatur	
Emitt Rhodes		Feb 25, 1950	Jul 19, 2020	Singer-songwriter, multi-instrumentalist, and recording engineer	Born in Decatur	
Herbert Ryman		Jun 28, 1910	Feb 10, 1989	Artist and Disney Imagineer	Grew up in Decatur	
Jackie Spinner				Author, journalist, college professor; Fulbright Scholar	Grew up in Decatur	
Edwin B. Willis		Jan 28, 1893	Nov 26, 1963	Academy Award-winning motion picture set designer and decorator	Born in Decatur	

=== Bands ===
Name	Image	Founded	Disbanded	Music	Association	Reference
Icon For Hire		2007	present	Rock band	Formed in Decatur	
V Shape Mind		1999	2004	Alternative rock band	Formed in Decatur	

== Military ==
Name	Image	Birth	Death	Known for	Association	Reference
Loren D. Hagen		Feb 25, 1946	Aug 7, 1971	United States Army first lieutenant, awarded Medal of Honor	1964 Graduate of MacArthur High School	
Lemuel F. Holland		Jul 28, 1840	Jan 13, 1914	Union Army sergeant, awarded Medal of Honor	Buried in Decatur (Greenwood Cemetery)	
Hermann Lieb		May 24, 1826	Mar 5, 1908	Union Army officer	Lived in Decatur	
Isaac C. Pugh		Nov 23, 1805	Nov 19, 1874	Union Army general	Buried in Decatur (Greenwood Cemetery)	
James H. Rupp		May 17, 1918	Sep 30, 1998	United States Navy lieutenant commander	Lived in Decatur	
Benjamin W. Schenck		Aug 12, 1837	Feb 19, 1916	Union Army private, awarded Medal of Honor	Buried in Decatur (Greenwood Cemetery)	

== Philanthropists ==
Name	Image	Birth	Death	Known for	Association	Reference
Connie Boochever		Jul 5, 1919	1999	Patron and advocate for the arts; member of Alaska Women's Hall of Fame	Born in Decatur	
Howard Warren Buffett		Oct 14, 1983		Faculty member at Columbia University; trustee of the Howard G. Buffett Foundation	Lived in Decatur	
Elizabeth Parke Firestone		Nov 15, 1897	Oct 13, 1990	Patron and collector of rare art pieces, widow of Harvey S. Firestone Jr.	Born in Decatur	

== Politics ==
Name	Image	Birth	Death	Known for	Association	Reference
Robert P. Kingsbury		May 5, 1926	Sep 7, 2013	New Hampshire House of Representatives	Born in Decatur	
Rolla C. McMillen		Oct 5, 1880	May 6, 1961	U.S. representative from Illinois	Lived in Decatur	
Jesse Hale Moore		Apr 22, 1817	Jul 11, 1883	U.S. representative from Illinois	Buried in Decatur (Greenwood Cemetery)	
Richard James Oglesby		Jul 25, 1824	Apr 24, 1899	U.S. senator and the 14th governor of Illinois	Grew up in Decatur	
James Benton Parsons		Aug 13, 1911	Jun 19, 1993	Chief judge of the United States District Court for the Northern District of Illinois	Attended school in Decatur, Buried in Greenwood Cemetery	
Thomas D. Westfall		May 14, 1927	Mar 7, 2005	Mayor of El Paso, Texas	Born in Decatur	

== Sports ==
=== Baseball ===
Name	Image	Birth	Death	Known for	Association	Reference
Walter "Boom-Boom" Beck		Oct 16, 1904	May 7, 1987	Pitcher for six Major League Baseball teams	Born in Decatur	
Chuck Dressen		Sep 20, 1894	Aug 10, 1966	Manager and coach for six Major League Baseball teams, 2-time World Series champion	Born in Decatur	
Harry East		1862	1905	Infielder for Baltimore Orioles	Born in Decatur	
Jeff Innis		Jul 5, 1962	Jan 30, 2022	Pitcher for New York Mets	Born in Decatur	
Kevin Koslofski		Sep 24, 1966		Outfielder for Kansas City Royals and Milwaukee Brewers	Born in Decatur	
Hobie Landrith		Mar 16, 1930	Apr 6, 2023	Catcher and coach for seven Major League Baseball teams	Born in Decatur	
Fred T. Long		Jan 22, 1896	Mar 23, 1966	Baseball player in Negro leagues; college football coach	Born in Decatur	
Bill Madlock		Jan 12, 1951		Third baseman for Texas Rangers, Chicago Cubs, San Francisco Giants, Pittsburgh Pirates, Los Angeles Dodgers and Detroit Tigers, 4-time NL batting champion	Grew up in Decatur	
Joe McGinnity		Mar 20, 1871	Nov 14, 1929	MLB pitcher 1899–1908, won 246 games, inducted 1946 in Baseball Hall of Fame	Grew up in Decatur	
Dan Porter		Oct 17, 1931	Jan 7, 2017	Outfielder for Washington Senators	Born in Decatur	
Kevin Roberson		Jan 29, 1968		Outfielder for Chicago Cubs and New York Mets	Born in Decatur	
Art Scharein		Jun 30, 1905	Jul 2, 1969	Infielder for St Louis Browns	Born in Decatur	
George Scharein		Nov 21, 1914	Dec 23, 1981	Shortstop for Philadelphia Phillies	Born in Decatur	
Jack Sheridan		1862	Nov 2, 1914	Umpire (1890–1914), worked at four World Series including Cubs' victory of 1908	Born in Decatur	
Roe Skidmore		Oct 30, 1945		Pinch-hitter for Chicago Cubs, rare MLB player with batting average of 1.000	Born in Decatur	
Brian Snitker		Oct 17, 1955		Manager of Atlanta Braves (2016–Present)	Born in Decatur	
Del Unser		Dec 9, 1944		Center fielder for Washington Senators, Cleveland Indians, New York Mets, Montreal Expos and Philadelphia Phillies	Born in Decatur	

=== Basketball ===
Name	Image	Birth	Death	Known for	Association	Reference
LaToya Bond		Feb 13, 1984		Guard for the Indiana Fever (WNBA)	Born in Decatur	
Todd Day		Jan 7, 1970		Shooting guard for five National Basketball Association teams	Born in Decatur	
Luke Harangody		Jan 2, 1988		Forward for the Boston Celtics and Cleveland Cavaliers	Born in Decatur	

=== Football ===
Name	Image	Birth	Death	Known for	Association	Reference
Jason Avant		Apr 20, 1983		Wide receiver for the Kansas City Chiefs	Attended MacArthur High School in Decatur	
Steve Fairchild		Jun 21, 1958		Head football coach at Colorado State University	Born in Decatur	
George Halas		Feb 2, 1895	Oct 31, 1983	Founder of the Decatur Staleys, which became the Chicago Bears	Lived in Decatur	
Harry Long		Dec 28, 1897	Dec 8, 1945	College football coach and Wiley College biology professor	Born in Decatur	
Brit Miller		Sep 15, 1986		Fullback for the St. Louis Rams	Born in Decatur	
Dante Ridgeway		Apr 18, 1984		Wide receiver for the New York Jets, St. Louis Rams and New Orleans Saints	Grew up in Decatur, MacArthur High School graduate	

=== Other sports ===
Name	Image	Birth	Death	Known for	Association	Reference
Guy Carlton		Jan 16, 1954	May 11, 2001	Weightlifter, Olympic medal winner	Went to High School in Decatur	
Kim Chizevsky-Nicholls		Apr 23, 1968		IFBB bodybuilder	Grew up in Decatur	
Penny Hammel		Mar 24, 1962		Golfer on the LPGA Tour	Born in Decatur	
