= Walter Lay =

American former politician

Walter Victor Lay (January 21, 1924 – January 20, 1983) was an American politician. He resigned from the Missouri House of Representatives in 1954, during his third term in office representing St. Louis. He introduced legislation to desegregate public schools in Missouri. Fellow St. Louis Democrat John W. Green joined him in co-sponsoring the legislation, reintroduced it after it died in the state senate during Lay’s first term. A resolution commemorating his birth was introduced in 1953. He managed Bill Clay’s district office in the early 1970s. Clay hired Pearlie Evans to take over the post because Lay kept his private sector job.

Lay died of a heart attack at his home in St Louis, a day before his 59th birthday.

== See also ==
- List of African-American officeholders (1900–1959)
