= John Greer =

John Greer may refer to:

- John Greer, character in Person of Interest
- John Greer (American football) (1889–1932), American football coach
- John Greer (sculptor), Canadian sculptor
- John Alexander Greer (1802–1855), Texas politician
- John Allen Greer (1874-1941), Tennessee politician
- John Michael Greer (born 1962), American author
- John W. Greer, Jr. (1909–1994), Georgia politician
- Big John Greer (1923–1972), American blues singer
