= Senator Greer =

Senator Greer may refer to:

- J. Ronnie Greer (born 1952), Tennessee State Senate
- John Allen Greer (1874-1941), Tennessee State Senate
- John W. Greer Jr. (1909–1994), Georgia State Senate
- Thomas Greer (senator) (1853–1928), Northern Irish Senate
