= Jonathan Green =

Jonathan Green or Jon Green may refer to:

- Jonathan Green (Australian journalist) (born 1959), Australian journalist, writer, editor, and Radio National broadcaster (inc. Every Bite and Blueprint for Living)
- Jonathon Green (born 1948), British lexicographer
- Jonathan Green (journalist) (fl. from 2010), English journalist and author
- Jonathan Green (medical writer) (1788–1864), naval surgeon, dermatologist
- Jonathan Green (painter) (born 1955), African American painter
- Jonathan Green (photographer) (born 1939), American photographer and writer
- Jonathan Green (psychiatrist) (fl. from 2015), professor of child and adolescent psychiatry
- Jonathan Green (speculative fiction writer) (born 1971), British writer of fantasy and science fiction
- Jonathan H. Green (1813–1887), American gambler, inventor, writer and later reformer
- Jonathan D. Green (fl. 2017), American musicologist, composer, and academic administrator
- Jonathan Smith Green (1796–1878), missionary from New England to Hawaii
- Jon Green (born 1985), Australian rugby league footballer
- Jon Green (cricketer) (Jonathan Adam Green, born 1980), English cricketer

== See also ==
- John Green (disambiguation)
- Jonathan Green House, in Stoneham, Massachusetts, U.S.
