= Reeves v. Sanderson Plumbing Products, Inc. =

- Supreme Court of the United States

Argued March 21, 2000 Decided June 12, 2000
- Full case name: Reeves v. Sanderson Plumbing Products, Inc.
- Citations: 530 U.S. 133 (more) 120 S. Ct. 2097; 147 L. Ed. 2d 105

Case history
- Prior: 197 F.3d 688 (5th Cir. 1999), reversed

Court membership
- Chief Justice William Rehnquist Associate Justices John P. Stevens · Sandra Day O'Connor; Antonin Scalia · Anthony Kennedy; David Souter · Clarence Thomas; Ruth Bader Ginsburg · Stephen Breyer

Case opinions
- Majority: O'Connor, joined by unanimous
- Concurrence: Ginsburg

Laws applied
- Age Discrimination in Employment Act of 1967

Reeves v. Sanderson Plumbing Products, Inc., 530 U.S. 133 (2000), was a case before the United States Supreme Court concerning age discrimination in employment.

== Background ==
In 1995, 57-year-old Roger Reeves and Joe Oswalt, who was in his mid-thirties, were supervisors at Sanderson Plumbing Products, being managed by 45-year-old Russell Caldwell. Caldwell reported a drop in production in the summer of 1995 to the director of manufacturing, Powe Chesnut, who was also married to the president of the company, Sandra Sanderson. Chesnut investigated briefly, and determined that Reeves, Oswalt, and Caldwell had all made errors in tracking time worked by their employees. Chesnut recommended to Sanderson that she fire Reeves and Caldwell, and in October 1995, she followed that recommendation.

== Procedural history ==
In June 1996, Reeves sued in the United States District Court for the Northern District of Mississippi under the Age Discrimination in Employment Act. He alleged that Chesnut "had demonstrated age-based animus" while they were working together, and that he had "absolute power" to make employment decisions, due to his position and his relationship with the president of the company. That case ended with the judge instructing the jury that Reeves must prove that age "was a determinative or motivating factor" in the employment decision in order to find in favor of the plaintiff, and the jury returned a verdict awarding Reeves $35,000 in compensatory damages and an additional $35,000 in liquidated damages based on the willfulness of the discrimination.

The Fifth Circuit Court of Appeals reversed, saying that Reeves did not provide enough evidence to prove that his age was the cause of the employment decision in question. This decision arose out of the determination that the discriminatory comments made by Chesnut "were not made in the direct context of Reeves's termination".

== Questions at issue ==
The court granted certiorari primarily to address the question of whether a prima facie case of discrimination is "adequate to sustain a finding of liability for intentional discrimination" against the employer, when "sufficient evidence" is provided to disprove the employer's defense of its decision.

== Opinion of the Court ==
Justice O'Connor delivered the majority opinion. Her first task was to set out the context of the case, starting with explaining that she would assume that McDonnell Douglas Corp. v. Green, 411 U.S. 792 (1973), was the relevant standard for analyzing a case brought under the ADEA, because nobody had disputed that fact, even though the court had never addressed that issue before. She also noted that they would assume that the plaintiff met his burden in laying out a prima facie case against the defendant, because again, nobody had disputed that contention, and ample supporting evidence had been presented.

She then turned to the next stage of the McDonnell Douglas burden-shifting framework to determine whether the defendant had then provided adequate evidence that the employment decision in question had been made for "a legitimate, nondiscriminatory reason." That burden, too, was met, according to O'Connor's analysis.

The final prong considered in the case was whether the plaintiff had provided, after the defendant's production of evidence of a nondiscriminatory reason for the decision, proof by "a preponderance of the evidence" that the defendant's reason is merely pretext. On this point, the court noted that most of the defendant's evidence for nondiscrimination was negated by the plaintiff at trial, and also that the Fifth Circuit agreed, but did not find this to be sufficient for a ruling in favor of Reeves. O'Connor explained that the Fifth Circuit was correct to think that the trial court could find in favor of the defendant if the nondiscriminatory reason was not disproven beyond a reasonable doubt, but they were mistaken in claiming that they were compelled to. The reasoning is that, if an employer is shown to be untruthful about the reason for a decision, they may be inferred to have been covering up actual discrimination.

The court stopped short of saying that a court must assume discrimination where a nondiscriminatory reason is shown to be false. The trier of fact may reasonably find for the employer where the plaintiff makes only a weak showing of evidence as to the untruth of the employer's defense, or where there is ample evidence of another nondiscriminatory reason that the employer did not offer.

After determining that the trial court could have found in favor of Reeves, O'Connor turned to examining the procedural questions at hand. She determined that respondent had not been entitled to a judgment as a matter of law, both because there was a question of fact to be decided by a jury in evaluating the truth of the defendant's nondiscriminatory explanation, and because the court of appeals should have reviewed the entire record in a manner favorable to the nonmoving party, which in this case was Reeves.

=== Justice Ginsburg's opinion concurring ===
Justice Ginsburg concurred but suggested that, because the court of appeals required Reeves to produce evidence that was neither a prima facie case nor evidence contradicting the defendant's proffered reasons, their decision could be overturned without any broader holding.

She also wrote separately to note that future cases may require the court to examine exactly which circumstances may give rise to the plaintiff being required to provide further evidence. She stated that such cases will be rare, because a dishonest defendant may be assumed to have some level of culpability, based on a fundamental principle of evidence law.

== Significance ==
This case lays out a framework for determining liability as part of the McDonnell Douglas burden-shifting framework, and clarifies parts of that framework as it applies to cases where the employer's reasons for making the decision are shown to be false. This was also the first case brought under the Age Discrimination in Employment Act of 1967 where the Supreme Court used the McDonnell Douglas framework to make their decision, though they left that question open for another case to decide, mainly because they were not asked to rule on the matter.

The ruling means that if a reasonable jury determines that an employer's explanation for an employee being dismissed was an excuse for age discrimination, then the employer is liable to the former employee under the Age Discrimination in Employment Act of 1967.
