= Eisenhower High School (Decatur, Illinois) =

Dwight Eisenhower High School

Location
- 1200 S 16th St; Decatur, Illinois 62521; United States; 39.829°N 88.9354°W

Information
- Type: Public
- School district: Decatur Public Schools District 61
- NCES District ID: 1711850
- NCES School ID: 171185001405
- Principal: Amy Zahm-Duncheon
- Teaching staff: 51.00 (on FTE basis)
- Grades: 9–12
- Gender: Co-ed
- Enrollment: 936 (2023-2024)
- Student to teacher ratio: 18.35
- Campus type: Urban
- Colors: Black; White
- Athletics: IHSA
- Athletics conference: Central State Eight Conference
- Team name: Panthers
- Rival: MacArthur High School
- Newspaper: Panther Press
- Website: ehs.dps61.org

Dwight Eisenhower High School is a public high school located in Decatur, Illinois. The school serves about 1,046 students in grades 9 to 12 in Decatur Public Schools District 61. Students from this school were featured on The N's Student Body, a show on which students competed against other students from their crosstown rival, MacArthur High School, to see who could lose the most weight for a $25,000 grand prize.

The fight song is "EHS Fight Song".

== History ==
Eisenhower High School was named after the World War II general and 34th President of the United States Dwight D. Eisenhower.

== Athletics ==
Eisenhower's High School athletics participate in the Central State Eight Conference and are members of the Illinois High School Association.

=== Boys ===
- Baseball
- Basketball
- Cross Country
- Football
- Golf
- Soccer
- Tennis
- Track & Field
- Wrestling

=== Girls ===
- Basketball
- Bowling
- Cheerleading
- Cross Country
- Golf
- Softball
- Soccer
- Tennis
- Track & Field
- Volleyball

=== Notable team state finishes ===
- Boys Baseball: 1961–62 (1st)
- Boys Basketball: 1975–76 (4th)
- Boys Tennis: 1989–90 (2nd), 1990–91 (3rd)
- Girls Bowling: 1990–91 (2nd), 1999–00 (3rd), 2000–01 (3rd)
- Girls Golf: 1995–96 (2nd)
- Group Interpretation: 1973–74 (2nd)

== Notable alumni ==
- Kim Chizevsky-Nicholls (IFBB bodybuilder) '86
- Jeff Innis (MLB)
- Bill Madlock (MLB)
- Brit Miller, former NFL fullback
- Kevin Roberson (MLB)
- Roe Skidmore (MLB)
- Marty Joe Murray (MO House of Representatives) '07
