= Levine Hat Company =

Levine Hat Company is a privately owned, family-operated hat store in St. Louis, Missouri, United States.

The business was founded by Benjamin Levine in 1903. Levine Hat Company has had 3 different locations, all in the Washington Avenue Historic District, sometimes referred to as the garment district. The company's showroom houses up to 50,000 hats at any given time, most of which are available for customers to browse and try on.

== Timeline ==
In 1903, shortly after emigrating from Russia, Benjamin Levine and his young family began a small hatmaking operation in Saint Louis. They had previously been furriers and cap hood makers in their homeland of Minsk.

In the 1970s the business moved into retail and phased out some of its manufacturing to become a specialty retailer.

In 2013, its historical hats and millinery equipment were loaned to The Griot Museum of Black History and showcased at Lambert International Airport.

In 2016, it garnered media attention when it sold a blue hat to NHL Coach Ken Hitchcock, who said it helped him win the Winter Classic.

In 2017, it sponsored a St Louis Art Museum exhibit featuring works of Edgar Degas.

== Recognition ==
Levine Hat Company was named one of the top 7 hat stores in the USA by GQ in 2011.

In 2018, it won the "Retailer of the Year" award from the National Headwear Association.
