= International Accreditation Council for Business Education =

- Official logo
- Abbreviation: IACBE
- Formation: 1997
- Type: NGO
- Purpose: Educational accreditation
- Headquarters: Kansas City area (Lenexa, Kansas)
- Location: International
- Region served: Global
- Members: Over 230 educational institutions in over 30 countries
- President: Dr. Archish Maharaja
- Website: www.iacbe.org

The International Accreditation Council for Business Education (IACBE), formerly the International Assembly for Collegiate Business Education, is an educational accreditation agency for college and university business programs founded in 1997. It is recognized by the Council for Higher Education Accreditation (CHEA) programmatic accrediting organization.

== Accreditation scope ==
The IACBE accredits associate's, bachelor's, master's, and doctoral-level degree programs in business and business-related fields at institutions with bachelor's and/or graduate degree programs throughout the world. It is based in Olathe, Kansas, United States, with member institutions in more than 20 countries throughout the world. Business programs are evaluated based on the IACBE's accreditation principles, which examine eight major areas: outcomes assessment, strategic planning, curriculum, faculty, scholarly and professional activities, resources, internal and external relationships, and educational innovation.

== History ==
The organization was established in 1997 by John L. Green Jr., who earlier founded the Accreditation Council for Business Schools and Programs. Following his retirement in June 2011, he was named as President Emeritus by the IACBE's Board of Directors. Dennis N. Gash, formerly Associate Professor of Economics at Jamestown College was appointed as the new IACBE President as of July 1, 2011.

The Council for Higher Education Accreditation (CHEA), whose recognition is accepted by the U.S. Department of Education, recognized IACBE as an accreditor in January 2011 as a result of a January 24, 2011, vote by the CHEA board of directors. IACBE first applied for CHEA recognition in 2003.

In 2017, it officially changed its name to International Accreditation Council for Business Education. In 2021, CHEA reaffirmed the recognition for additional seven years.
