= McDonnell Douglas Corp. v. Green =

McDonnell Douglas v. Green
- Supreme Court of the United States

Argued March 28, 1973 Decided May 14, 1973
- Full case name: McDonnell Douglas Corp. v. Green
- Citations: 411 U.S. 792 (more) 93 S. Ct. 1817; 36 L. Ed. 2d 668

Case history
- Prior: Green v. McDonnell-Douglas Corp., 318 F. Supp. 846 (E.D. Mo. 1970); 463 F.2d 337 (8th Cir. 1970); cert. granted, 409 U.S. 1036 (1972).
- Subsequent: On remand, Green v. McDonnell Douglas Corp., 390 F. Supp. 501 (E.D. Mo. 1975); affirmed, 528 F.2d 1102 (8th Cir. 1976).

Court membership
- Chief Justice Warren E. Burger Associate Justices William O. Douglas · William J. Brennan Jr. Potter Stewart · Byron White; Thurgood Marshall · Harry Blackmun; Lewis F. Powell Jr. · William Rehnquist

Case opinion
- Majority: Powell, joined by unanimous

Laws applied
- Title VII of the Civil Rights Act of 1964

McDonnell Douglas Corp. v. Green, 411 U.S. 792 (1973), is a US employment law case by the United States Supreme Court regarding the burdens and nature of proof in proving a Title VII case and the order in which plaintiffs and defendants present proof. It was the seminal case in the McDonnell Douglas burden-shifting framework.

Title VII of the Civil Rights Act of 1964 is a United States federal law that prohibits employment discrimination based on race, color, religion, sex or national origin. After the Supreme Court ruling, the Civil Rights Act of 1991 (Pub. L. 102-166) amended several sections of Title VII.

Title VII prohibits employment discrimination "because of" certain reasons. While "because of" may be understood in the conversational sense, the McDonnell Douglas case was the first landmark case to define this phrase.

== Facts ==
McDonnell Douglas was an aerospace company in St. Louis at the time of the lawsuit, but has since been acquired by Boeing. Percy Green was a black mechanic and laboratory technician laid off by McDonnell Douglas in 1964 during a reduction in force at the company.

Green, a long-time activist in the civil rights movement, protested that his discharge was racially motivated. He and others, in a protest referred to in the case history as a "stall-in", used cars to block roads to McDonnell Douglas factories. On one occasion, someone used a chain to lock the front door of a McDonnell Douglas downtown business office, preventing employees from leaving, though it was not certain whether Green was responsible.

Soon after the locked-door incident, McDonnell Douglas advertised for vacant mechanic positions, for which Green was qualified. Green applied, but was not hired, with McDonnell Douglas citing his participation in blocking traffic and chaining the building.

Green subsequently filed a complaint with the Equal Employment Opportunity Commission (EEOC), alleging that he had been treated unfairly because of his activity in the Civil Rights Movement, but not alleging any outright racial bias. He then sued in U.S. District Court on both of those grounds, though the EEOC had not made a finding on the latter, and later appealed the decision to the U.S. Court of Appeals for the Eighth Circuit before the Supreme Court agreed to hear the case.

The case was argued in front of the U.S District Court, the U.S. Court of Appeals, and in front of the Supreme Court by Louis Gilden, a leading civil rights attorney and solo practitioner from St. Louis. The Supreme Court's decision was awarded to Green in a 9-0 vote.

== Judgment ==
The Supreme Court held the following, delivered by Justice Powell.

1. A complainant's right to bring suit under the Civil Rights Act of 1964 is not confined to charges as to which the EEOC has made a reasonable-cause finding, and the District Court's error in holding to the contrary was not harmless since the issues raised with respect to 703 (a) (1) were not identical to those with respect to 704 (a) and the dismissal of the former charge may have prejudiced respondent's efforts at trial.
2. In a private, non-class-action complaint under Title VII charging racial employment discrimination, the complainant has the burden of establishing a prima facie case, which he can satisfy by showing that (i) he belongs to a racial minority; (ii) he applied and was qualified for a job the employer was trying to fill; (iii) though qualified, he was rejected; and (iv) thereafter the employer continued to seek applicants with complainant's qualifications.
3. Here, the Court of Appeals, though correctly holding that respondent proved a prima facie case, erred in holding that petitioner had not discharged its burden of proof in rebuttal by showing that its stated reason for the rehiring refusal was based on respondent's illegal activity. But on remand respondent must be afforded a fair opportunity of proving that petitioner's stated reason was just a pretext for a racially discriminatory decision, such as by showing that whites engaging in similar illegal activity were retained or hired by petitioner. Other evidence that may be relevant, depending on the circumstances, could include facts that petitioner had discriminated against respondent when he was an employee or followed a discriminatory policy toward minority employees.

== Significance ==
Arguably the most important part of the Court's decision is the creation of a framework for the decision of Title VII cases where there is only relatively indirect evidence as to whether an employment action was discriminatory in nature. The McDonnell Douglas case established that, in an employment discrimination case:

1. The plaintiff (employee) must first establish a prima facie case of discrimination.
2. The defendant (employer) must produce evidence of a legitimate non-discriminatory reason for its actions. If this occurs, then the presumption of discrimination dissipates.
3. The plaintiff must then be afforded a fair opportunity to present facts to show an inference of discrimination. The plaintiff may do so either by showing that the defendant’s explanation is insufficient and only a pretext for discrimination or by otherwise proving that the defendant's actions used one of the listed unlawful discriminatory parameters.

In practice, the third step is the most difficult step for plaintiffs to achieve successfully. Plaintiffs bear the ultimate burden of persuasion at all times.

This framework differs from earlier strategies for resolving employment discrimination cases in that it affords the employee a lower burden of proof for rebutting an employer's response to the initial prima facie cases. Instead of questioning whether the employer acted "because of" an unlawful discriminatory factor, the court may now investigate whether the employer's proffered reasons for taking the employment action at issue were in fact a pretext.

Since the case was handed down in 1973, all the federal courts have subsequently adopted the order and allocation of proof set out in McDonnell Douglas for all claims of disparate-treatment employment discrimination that are not based on direct evidence of discriminatory intent.

As for the impact of the case on the original plaintiff and defendant, the case was remanded to the District Court to adjudicate the case in compliance with the Supreme Court's ruling. On remand, the district court found in favor of McDonnell Douglas. That decision was again appealed to the Eighth Circuit Court of Appeals, and was affirmed.

In March 2025, the Court declined to re-examine the McDonnell Douglas test in Hittle v. City of Stockton. In Hittle, a fire chief alleged that he was fired because of his Christian faith, and lower courts ruled that plaintiff did not present sufficient evidence of discrimination. Justices Clarence Thomas and Neil Gorsuch dissented from the denial of certiorari.

== See also ==
- US labor law
- List of United States Supreme Court cases, volume 411
- List of United States Supreme Court cases by the Burger Court
