= The Griot Museum of Black History =

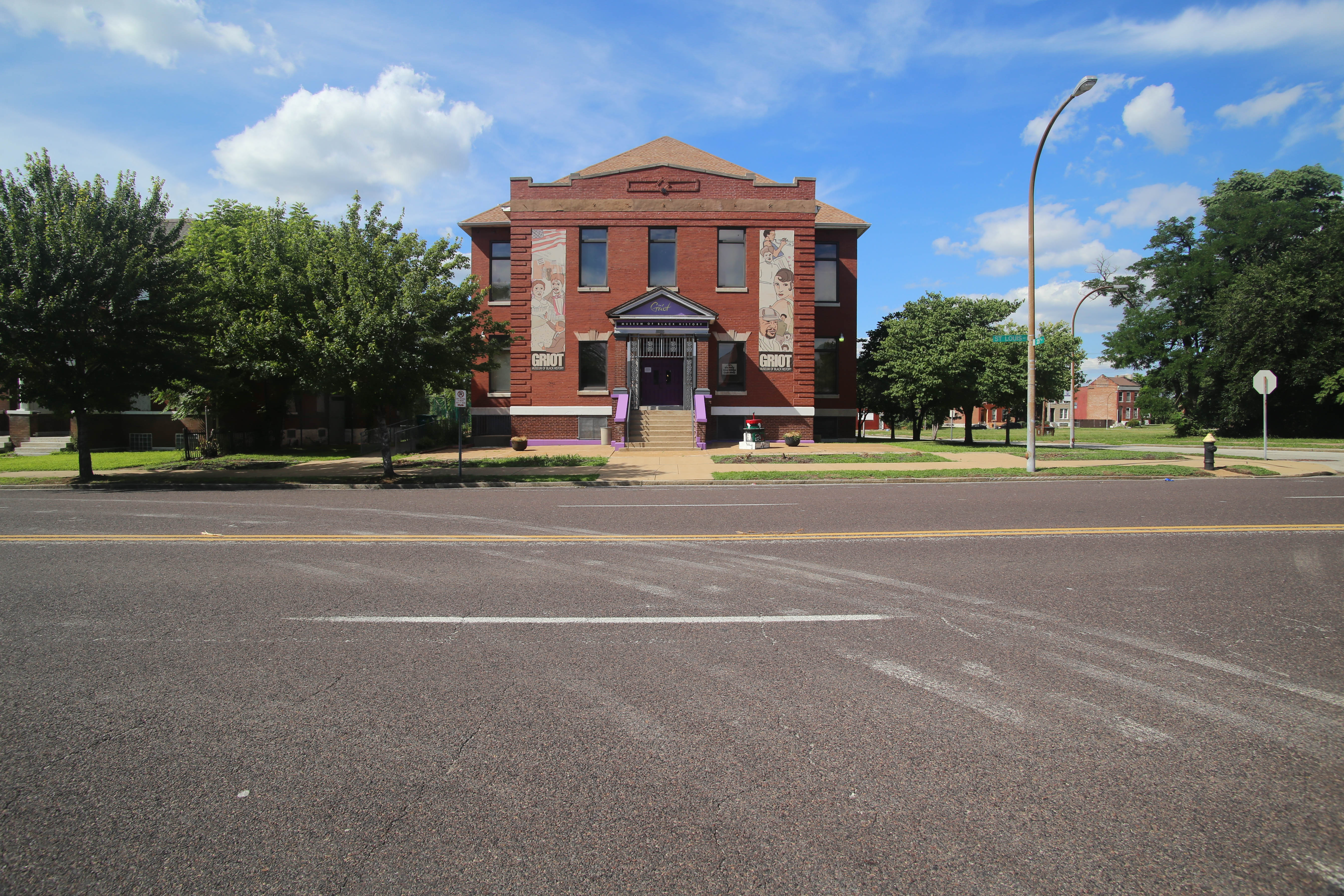
- Griot Museum of Black History
- Former name: The Black World History Wax Museum
- Established: February 1997
- Location: St. Louis, Missouri
- Coordinates: 38.652890°N 90.209271°W
- Type: wax museum
- Founder: Lois Conley
- President: Lois Conley
- CEO: Lois Conley
- Public transit access: MetroBus
- Website: www.thegriotmuseum.com

The Griot Museum of Black History is a wax museum in St. Louis, Missouri, founded in 1997. Originally named The Black World History Wax Museum, the organization changed its name to The Griot Museum of Black History (“The Griot”) in 2009. In some west African countries, the griot, is a historian, storyteller, praise singer, poet and/or musician. The griot is a repository of oral tradition and is often seen as a societal leader who preserves and shares cultural traditions of a community. Likewise, the museum collects, preserves, and shares the stories, culture, and history of Black people with a focus on those with a regional connection to St. Louis.

== History ==
The Griot is the second African American wax museum in the country, the first being National Great Blacks In Wax Museum in Baltimore. Founder Lois Conley was born in St. Louis and attended Saint Louis University for both her B.A. in Communications and M.A. in education. She also completed a graduate certificate in Museum Studies at University of Missouri–St. Louis.

In 2009, the Missouri Humanities Council formed the Urban Museum Collaborative with the Griot and two other St. Louis museums, Eugene Field House Museum and Campbell House Museum, to share resources and collaborate on educational programs following a "museum without walls" model to connect museum exhibits with their surrounding urban environments.

== Exhibits and Programs ==
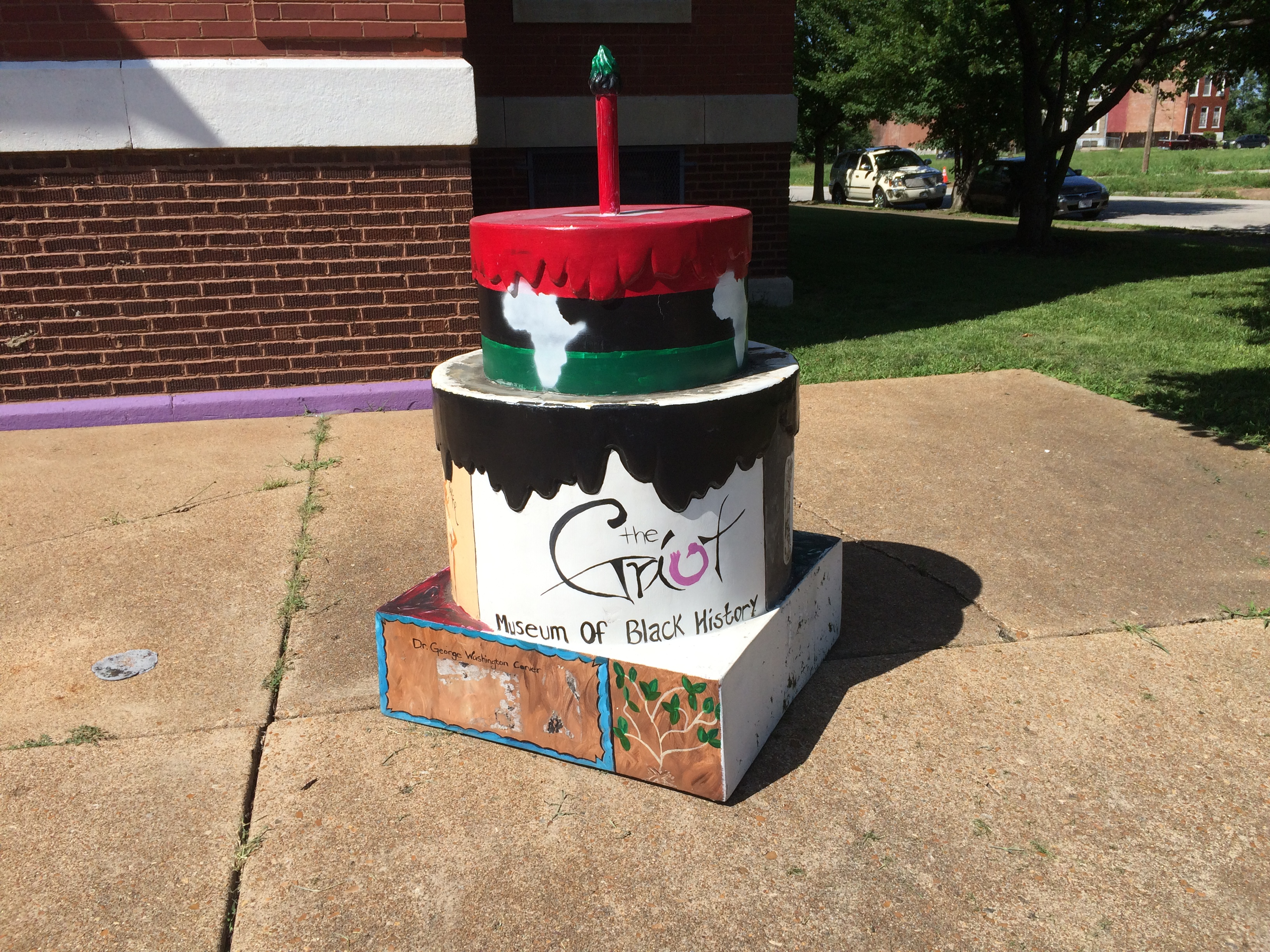
One of the "cakes" from the St. Louis 250 anniversary installed in front of the Griot Museum of Black History.

=== Permanent exhibits ===
The Griot has numerous displays of wax sculptures, art, and memorabilia. Featured historical figures include Carter G. Woodson, Josephine Baker, Dred and Harriet Scott, Elizabeth Keckley, William Wells Brown, James Milton Turner, Clark Terry, Dr. Martin Luther King Jr., Miles Davis, Madame C.J. Walker, York, Percy Green, among others. Museum founder Lois Conley made many of the wax sculptures herself.

The museum features a slave cabin built on the Wright–Smith Plantation in Jonesburg, Missouri. A scale model section of a slave ship used to transport Africans to America during the Atlantic Slave Trade is accompanied by a documentary film on the Middle Passage. A portrayal of auctions at the Old Courthouse includes artifacts from the people who were enslaved at that time. Other exhibits feature famous people and important figures of St. Louis black history through music, agriculture, civic service and advocacy.

The museum hosts arts and humanities exhibits and sponsors education projects, gallery talks, and cultural celebrations.

=== Seasonal exhibits and programs ===
40 Acres and a Mule- An annual art show fundraiser is named after an unfilled promise to grant forty acres and a mule to formerly enslaved black farmers.

Eminent Domain/Displaced- The Eminent Domain/Displaced exhibit featured stories of the historic Mill Creek Valley and nearby sections of St. Louis Place demolished for the National Geospatial-Intelligence Agency site.

Black HIV/AIDS Awareness 2019- The Griot marked the 50th anniversary of the death of Robert Rayford, the first known victim of HIV/AIDS in the United States. The museum hosted events around National Black HIV/AIDS Awareness Day, February 7, encouraging community members to contribute memorabilia and providing health screenings.

Black HerStory Initiative- In 2021, the Griot received a Monument Lab grant to honor Black women who have contributed to St. Louis cultural, social, and political history. Monuments will be constructed in honor of St. Louis natives Pearlie Evans and Mary Meachum.

== See also ==
- African-American Heritage Sites
- African-American history
- List of museums and cultural institutions in Greater St. Louis
- List of museums focused on African Americans
