= Tenant Brown =

American politician (1874–1941)

Member of the Tennessee Senate from the 20th district
- In office 1911–1913
- Preceded by: John Allen Greer
- Succeeded by: John W. C. Church

Personal details
- Profession: Politician

Tenant Brown was an American politician. Brown was a member of the Tennessee State Senate representing Lewis County, Maury County, and Perry County from 1911 to 1913.
