= Decatur Public Schools District 61 =

School district in Macon County, Illinois

Address
- 101 West Cerro Gordo Street Decatur, Illinois, 62523; United States

District information
- Type: Public
- Motto: “Educating for Success”
- Grades: PreK–12
- NCES District ID: 1711850

Students and staff
- Students: 8,518

Other information
- Website: www.dps61.org

Decatur Public Schools District 61 is a public unit school district in Macon County, Illinois. As of 2018 it was the 26th largest school district in Illinois, and had one pre-kindergarten/early learning center, four full K-8 schools, eleven elementary schools with kindergarten through sixth grade, two middle schools, two high schools, and two alternative education programs.

The district includes the majority of Decatur.

One of the grade schools is a Montessori school. High schools include Eisenhower High School and MacArthur High School. An older high school, Stephen Decatur High School, closed in 2000.

As of 2022 the District has 5 elementary schools, 1 middle school, 2 high schools, and 7 specialty schools.

== History ==
The earliest record of schooling in Decatur, Illinois, is of school being held in a room on South Main Street in 1830; afterwards it was held in the log courthouse in 1831 and 1832. Decatur's first purpose-built schoolhouse was a two-story building at Water and North Park streets, built in the 1840s by the Freemasons, with a classroom on the first floor and the Mason lodge room on the second floor.

Schools were private at the time, but a state law in 1849 allowed, by public vote, a real estate tax to support schools; Decatur citizens passed the tax in 1851 to repair the "brick school house", presumably the one built by the Masons.

In Illinois, the general school law on February 15, 1855, provided for taxes across the state to educate all children in the state, and required that each district maintain school for at least 6 months each year. Under the new law that year, the first school district in Decatur was formed, and the first building exclusively for school purposes, the "Big Brick", was built at the northwest corner of Church and North streets, and opened in 1857. However, the general school law was believed to be unsuitable for a city school system, and the modern Decatur school district was established by a special charter of the Illinois General Assembly approved on February 16, 1865.

High school was first held on September 22, 1862, in the east room of the Big Brick, and later in the basement of the Baptist church. The first high school commencement was on June 20, 1867, at Powers Hall, with four girls graduating. The first purpose-built high school building was opened in September 1869 at North and Broadway streets.

== Schools ==
=== High schools ===
- DPS Alternative Education
- Eisenhower High School
- MacArthur High School

=== Primary schools ===
- American Dreamer STEM Academy
- Baum Elementary School
- Dennis Lab School
- DPS Alternative Education
- Franklin Grove Elementary School
- Hope Academy
- Johns Hill Magnet School
- Montessori Academy for Peace
- Muffley Elementary School
- Parsons Elementary School
- Pershing Early Learning Program
- South Shores Elementary School
- Stephen Decatur Middle School
