= John Green (Middlesex cricketer) =

English cricketer (1896–1960)

John James Green (31 December 1896 – 25 October 1960) was an English first-class cricketer active 1919 who played for Middlesex. He was born in Marylebone and died in North Kensington.
