= Alistair MacDuff =

Sir Alistair Geoffrey MacDuff (born 26 May 1945) is a retired British judge of the High Court of England and Wales.

== Legal career ==
MacDuff was called to the bar at Lincoln's Inn in 1969 and made a Queen's Counsel in 1993. From 1987 to 1997, he was a Recorder. From 1997 to 2008, he was a circuit judge on the Midland and Oxford Circuit latterly designated to hear civil cases in Birmingham; in 2002, he became a senior circuit judge. On 14 April 2008, MacDuff was appointed a Justice of the High Court, receiving the customary knighthood, and assigned to the Queen's Bench Division.
