= Syed I. Ahson =

Indian computer scientist (died 2024)

S. I. Ahson
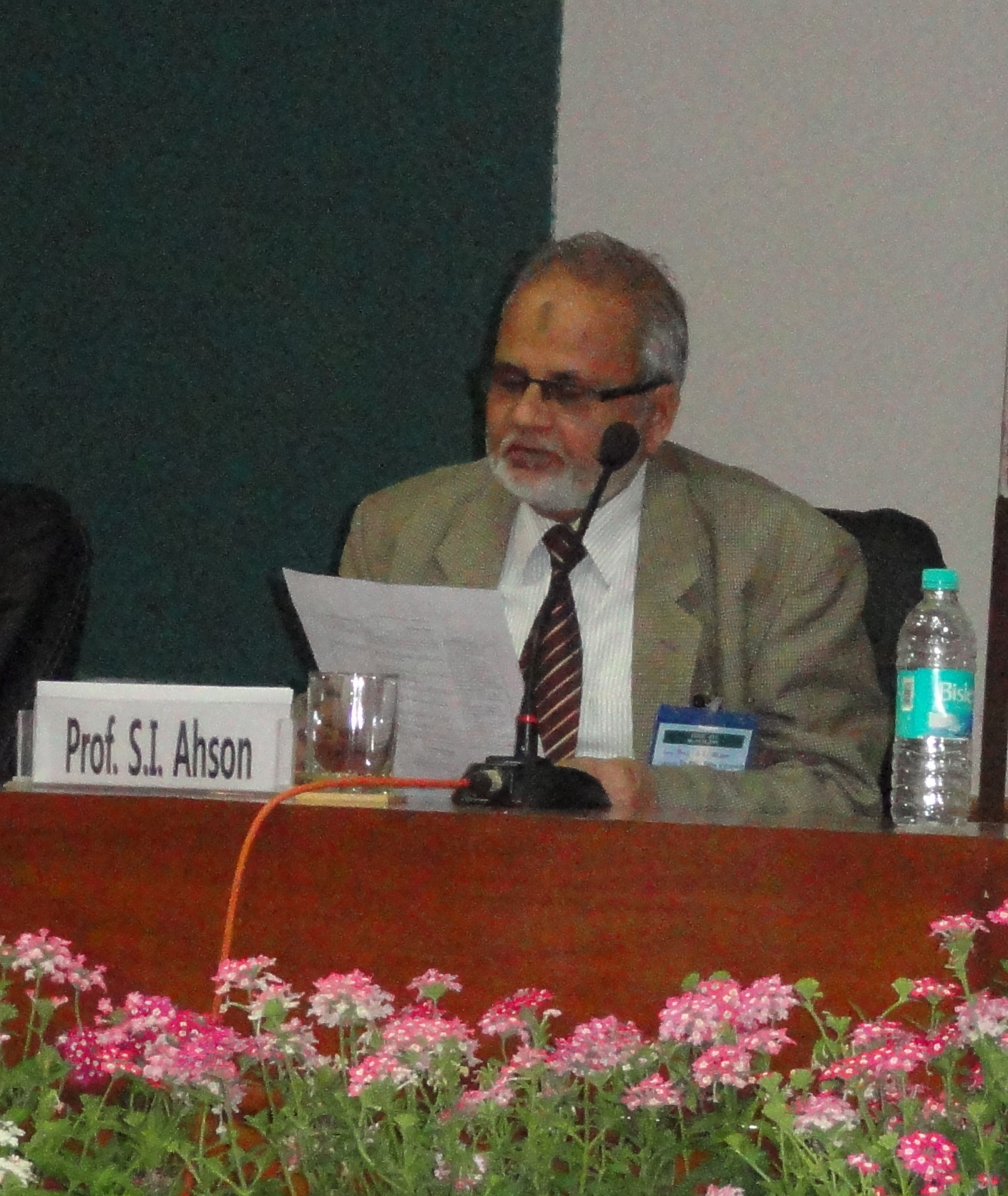
- Photograph was taken at National Conference on Open Source and Cloud Computing (OSACC-2012)
- Died: 2024-07-17
- Occupations: Professor, author

Syed I Ahson is a computer science professor, education management professional, researcher, and author. He specialises in multiple areas, including bioinformatics, computational biology, and Web 2.0. Ahson graduated from University of Sheffield in the United Kingdom. He was a National Merit Scholarship Award, India (1959–1965). He also won a British Council Overseas Scholarship Award for Ph.D. (1973–1975). He later taught in Saudi Arabia and India. His recent posting was at Patna University, Bihar as pro-Vice chancellor. While there he enacted educational reforms amide political chaos and bureaucracy.

In 2010, he stepped down from the post of pro-Vice chancellor of Patna University.

He has published several research papers in national as well as international journal and conference proceedings. Ahson is also the founder Head of the Department of Computer Science at Jamia Millia University.

== Work ==
- Lecturer, Patna University, Bihar, India
- Assistant Professor and Professor, Indian Institute of Technology, Delhi, India (1978–1987)
- Chairman and Professor, Computer Engineering Department, King Saud University, Riyadh, Saudi Arabia (1988–1990)
- Professor, Indian Institute of Technology, Delhi, India (1991–1992)
- Professor, King Saud University, Riyadh, Saudi Arabia (1993–2000)
- Professor of Computer Science, Jamia Millia Islamia, New Delhi, India (2001–2007)
- Pro-Vice-Chancellor of Patna University, Bihar, India
- Professor of Eminence, Shobhit University, Uttar Pradesh, India (2011–2012)

== Books ==
- S. I. Ahson and Monica Mehrotra (Editors), "Proceedings of National Workshop on Software Security (NWSS-2007)", 13-14 Sept. 2007, I.K. International Publishing House Pvt Lmtd., New Delhi
- S. I. Ahson and S.M.Bhaskar, "Information Security-A Practical Approach", -Narosa Publications – 2008, Alpha Science/Oxford
- S. I. Ahson and R.Prasad, "Swachalit Niyantran Nikayon ke Siddhant",(Hindi), Madhya Pradesh Hindi Granth Academy, Bhopal, 1980
- S. I. Ahson (Editor-in-Chief), "Recent Advances in Servomechanisms Design and Realization in India", Indian Space Research Organization (ISRO), Bangalore, 1984.
- D.P.Kothari, A. K. Mahalanabis and S. I. Ahson, "Computer-Aided System Analysis and Design", Tata McGraw-Hill, 1988.
- S. I. Ahson, "Microprocessors", Tata McGraw-Hill, 1986.
- R. A. Khan, K. Mustafa and S. I. Ahson, "Software Quality Concepts and Practices", Narosa Publications, 2006 Alpha Science/Oxford 2007.
