= Mohammad Qasim Hashimzai =

Dr. Mohammad Qasim Hashimzai is Deputy Minister of Justice of the Islamic Republic of Afghanistan. He earned his B.A. and master's degree in Law from Oxford University and obtained a Ph.D. at Sheffield University. From 1973 to 1977, he worked in Kabul as Deputy Head of the Supreme Court's Research Department. In England he worked for the BBC Monitoring Service from 1981 to 1998 as Afghan Monitor, Chief Monitor and Duty Editor. After living in England for over 20 years Dr. Hashimzai returned to Afghanistan in 2002, after the overthrow of the Taliban, under a UN scheme as an advisor to the Minister of Justice of the Transitional State of Afghanistan. In 2006 he was a candidate for the High Council of the Afghan Supreme Court.

His academic publications include:

- The Separation of Powers and the Problem of Constitutional Interpretation in Afghanistan, in: Constitutionalism in Islamic Countries: Between Upheaval and Continuity (eds. Rainer Grote and Tilmann Röder, OUP, Oxford and New York 2011)
- The Reality and Challenges of Legal and Judicial Reconstruction in Afghanistan, in Legal and Judicial Reform in Post-Conflict Situations and the Role of the International Community (CILC: Den Haag, 2007)
