= Stephen Billings =

British engineer (1951–2022)

Stephen A. Billings (1951 – 18 December 2022) was Professor of Signal Processing and Complex Systems, and Director of the Signal Processing and Complex Systems Research Group, in the Dept. of Automatic Control and Systems Engineering of the University of Sheffield. He died on 18 December 2022. He was one of only seven academics of that university counted as "highly cited" by the ISI Web of Knowledge with over 500 publications to his name. Based on information from the Web of Science he is ranked as the fourth most highly cited engineer in the UK, over all categories of engineering, and is one of the world's most highly cited systems and control engineers.

Billings was born in 1951 in the UK, and studied Electrical Engineering at Liverpool University, receiving a BEng (first class honours) in 1972. He went on to gain a PhD from the University of Sheffield in 1975, joining the ACSE department the same year. He rose to Professor in 1990 and Director in 2001.

Billings was a Chartered Engineer, Chartered Mathematician and Chartered Scientist. He was elected Fellow of the Institute of Mathematics and its Applications in 1989 and of the Institute of Electrical Engineers in 1992. He was awarded the degree of DEng by Liverpool University in 1990.
