= McDonnell Douglas burden-shifting =

Procedure in U.S. law for employment discrimination claims

In United States employment discrimination law, McDonnell Douglas burden-shifting or the McDonnell-Douglas burden-shifting framework refers to the procedure for adjudicating a motion for summary judgement under a Title VII disparate treatment claim, in particular a "private, non-class action challenging employment discrimination", that lacks direct evidence of discrimination. It was introduced by the United States Supreme Court in McDonnell Douglas v. Green and Texas Dept. of Community Affairs v. Burdine and has been elaborated on in subsequent cases.

The McDonnell-Douglas framework is typically used when a case lacks direct evidence of discrimination. In other cases, courts may decide not to use the McDonnell-Douglas framework, and instead evaluate disparate treatment claims under the Price Waterhouse "mixed motive" framework.

== Framework ==
The framework as currently applied by courts is as follows:

1. A plaintiff must first establish a prima facie case by a preponderance of the evidence, i.e. allege facts that are adequate to support a legal claim. (see the below section for more)
2. Then the burden of production shifts to the employer, to rebut this prima facie case by "articulat[ing] some legitimate, nondiscriminatory reason for the employee’s rejection."
3. Then the plaintiff may prevail only if the plaintiff can show that the employer's response is merely a pretext for behavior actually motivated by discrimination.

Even though the employer bears the burden of production in the second step, the plaintiff bears the burden of persuasion at all times.

== Evolution of the framework ==
In St. Mary's Honor Center v. Hicks, the court revisited the third step in the framework. Initially explaining that affected employee should merely "be afforded a fair opportunity to show that petitioner's stated reason for respondent's rejection was in fact, pretext", the court revised its initial guidance and added that the employee must also show that the employer's actions were in fact motivated by discrimination.

Then, in Reeves v. Sanderson Plumbing Products, Inc., the Court emphasized that "a plaintiff’s prima facie case of age discrimination, combined with sufficient evidence to find that the employer’s asserted justification for its action was false, may permit the trier of fact to conclude that the employer unlawfully discriminated," and that the plaintiff need not always introduce additional and independent evidence of discrimination.

In March 2025, the Court decline to hear the appeal of the Ninth Circuit decision in Hittle v. City of Stockton, where a fire chief alleged that he was fired because of his Christian faith, and lower courts ruled that plaintiff did not present sufficient evidence of discrimination. Justices Clarence Thomas and Neil Gorsuch dissented from the denial of certiorari. Justice Thomas stating, "I would have taken this opportunity to revisit McDonnell Douglas and decide whether its burden-shifting framework remains a workable and useful evidentiary tool."

== Showings for a prima facie case ==
In his majority opinion in McDonnell Douglas, Justice Powell also outlined circumstances that would satisfy the first burden placed on plaintiffs in Title VII cases, i.e., the initial prima facie showing of discrimination. This burden is met by showing

1. that the employee belongs to a racial minority;
2. that the employee applied and was qualified for a job for which the employer was seeking applicants;
3. that, despite the employee's qualifications, the employee was rejected; and
4. that, after the employee's rejection, the position remained open and the employer continued to seek applicants from persons of complainant's qualifications.
