= John Henry Green =

English physician (1636–1685)

John Henry Green (1636–1685) was an English physician and philanthropist.

Green was born in London and trained as a physician. He worked primarily with the poor and did not earn a large income, but he inherited some money and made a significant fortune from investment of that inheritance.

He continued with his work as a physician, but also used his wealth to fund the acquisition of medicine and medical supplies, and also to fund programs to improve the health of the poor.

Green's work was brought to an abrupt end when he was arrested on charges of buggery, made in relation to consensual acts with his wife. He was held in Newgate Prison during the trial and although the only evidence was from third parties, his wife refused to refute the charges upon oath. This refusal sealed Green's fate and he was found guilty, and executed at Tyburn gallows on 19 August 1685.
