= John Green (footballer, born 1896) =

English footballer (1896–1927)

Personal information
- Full name: John Green
- Date of birth: 1896
- Place of birth: Blackburn, England
- Date of death: 1927 (aged 30–31)
- Place of death: Canada
- Position: Inside forward

Senior career*
Years	Team	Apps	(Gls)
1914–1919	Grenadier Guards		
1919–1920	Blackburn Rovers	0	(0)
1920–1921	Fleetwood		
1921–1923	Nottingham Forest	11	(2)
1923–1924	Luton Town	26	(5)
1924–1925	Southend United	0	(0)
1925–1926	Lancaster Town		
1926	Montreal Carsteel		
1927	Providence Clamdiggers		
1927	Montreal CNR		
Total		37	(7)
- * Club domestic league appearances and goals

John Green (1896–1927) was an English footballer who played in the Football League for Luton Town and Nottingham Forest. He emigrated to Canada in 1926 and died in a car accident a year later.
