= Nick Hurst =

English writer

- Born: London
- Occupations: Writer, marketer
- Writing career
- Subjects: Martial arts, travel, history, fiction
- Website: www.nickhurst.co.uk

Nick Hurst is an English writer who in 2012 published his first book Sugong: The Life of a Shaolin Grandmaster.

Hurst was born and grew up in London where he began Shaolin kung fu. Having gained a black belt he gave up a job in advertising and went to train with his grandmaster Sugong in Malaysia aged 30.

He was faced with a daunting prospect as his grandmaster had a reputation as an extremely short-tempered man with fearsome martial arts abilities and a background of run-ins with gangsters. Furthermore, Hurst had not received any assurances Sugong would teach him before he left.

Hurst was allowed to train under Sugong and eventually wrote his book about him. This was an undertaking complicated by Sugong's temperamental character which saw Hurst and his translator suffer numerous verbal onslaughts.

Hurst studied at the University of Sheffield and academics from their School of East Asian Studies assisted him to ensure the historical accuracy of his book.

It has been described as 'part biography, part social history, part memoir' and received positive reviews.

Hurst's second book Falling From the Floating World was published in 2019.

Despite being a thriller set in modern-day Tokyo, a twist in the plot meant it was illustrated with Japanese ukiyo-e woodblock prints sourced from museums across the world.

In a further departure from convention, Hurst's research into Japanese irezumi tattooing resulted in him getting the same full-back tattoo one of the characters in the story is forced to have. This was done in the traditional hand-poked tebori method by leading Tokyo master Horitoku.

In addition to his books, Hurst has written articles for newspapers and magazines including the Guardian and Time Out.

== Works ==
- Sugong: The Life of a Shaolin Grandmaster (2012), tells the life story of Hurst's kung fu grandmaster, interspersed with Hurst's experiences living in Malaysia to train with him.
- Falling From the Floating World (2019), is a thriller set in Tokyo and features yakuza, corrupt politicians, call-girls and murder.
