= Hittle v. City of Stockton =

2024 United States Court of Appeals for the Ninth Circuit case

- Court: United States Court of Appeals for the Ninth Circuit
- Full case name: Ronald Hittle v. City of Stockton, California, Robert Deis; Laurie Montes
- Argued: March 27 2023
- Decided: May 17 2024
- Citation: 101 F.4th 1000

Case history
- Prior history: Appeal from E.D. Cal.

Holding
- Summary judgment in employer’s favor was appropriate where the employer’s legitimate, non-discriminatory reasons for firing plaintiff were, in sum, sufficient to rebut the evidence of discrimination, and plaintiff failed to persuasively argue that these non-discriminatory reasons were pretextual.

Court membership
- Judges sitting: Ronald M. Gould, Sandra S. Ikuta, Edward R. Korman

Case opinions
- Majority: Edward R. Korman

Laws applied
- Title VII of the Civil Rights Act of 1964 and California Fair Employment and Housing Act

Hittle v. City of Stockton, 101 F.4th 1000 (9th Cir. 2024), was a United States Court of Appeals for the Ninth Circuit decision where the court held that that the city's decision to terminate a fire chief did not constitute unlawful religious discrimination under Title VII of the Civil Rights Act of 1964 or the California Fair Employment and Housing Act (FEHA). In March 2025, the United States Supreme Court declined to review the decision.

== Background ==
Hittle was a fire chief in the City of Stockton from 2005 to 2011. His employer terminated him for alleged misconduct. He sued the city, claiming he was fired due to his Christian faith. In response, the employer presented a 250-page report detailing his misconduct.

In March 2022, the United States District Court for the Eastern District of California granted summary judgment in favor of the employer, ruling that Hittle had not provided sufficient evidence to proceed to trial. The Ninth Circuit panel affirmed in August 2023.

== Opinion of the court ==
In May 2024, the Ninth Circuit denied Hittle's petition for a panel rehearing and a rehearing en banc. The court affirmed and amended its 2023 decision.

The court ruled that the McDonnell Douglas burden-shifting framework governs employment discrimination claims under Title VII and California FEHA. The court found that the employer had provided legitimate, non-discriminatory reasons for Hittle's termination. Because Hittle did not convincingly argue that these reasons were a pretext for religious discrimination, summary judgment for the employer was upheld.

== Subsequent developments ==
Hittle filed certiorari with the U.S. Supreme Court in October 2024. The U.S. Supreme Court declined to hear his appeal. Justices Clarence Thomas and Neil Gorsuch dissented, with Justice Thomas stating, "I would have taken this opportunity to revisit McDonnell Douglas and decide whether its burden-shifting framework remains a workable and useful evidentiary tool."
