= John Greer (American football) =

American football coach (1889–1932)

Biographical details
- Born: June 7, 1889; Washington, D.C., U.S.
- Died: November 24, 1932 (aged 43); Upper Darby Township, Pennsylvania, U.S.

Playing career

Football
- 1908–1910: Catholic University
- 1911: Georgetown
- Position: Guard

Coaching career (HC unless noted)

Football
- 1912: Catholic University (assistant)
- 1913: Catholic University
- 1914–1916: Philadelphia Catholic HS (PA)
- 1920–1921: Philadelphia Catholic HS (PA)
- 1924–1925: Salesianum School (DE)

Baseball
- 1915–1917: Philadelphia Catholic HS (PA)

Administrative career (AD unless noted)
- 1914–1917: Philadelphia Catholic HS (PA)

Head coaching record
- Overall: 1–4–1 (college)

John James Greer (June 7, 1889 – November 24, 1932) was an American football coach. He served as the head football coach at the Catholic University in Washington, D.C. in 1913, compiling a record of 1–4–1.

Greer was born on June 7, 1889, in Washington, D.C., to William Alexander and Cecilia (Throckmorton) Greer. He attended Business High School in Washington, D.C., where he played football before graduating in 1908. Greer then went to Catholic University, where he competed in football, basketball, baseball, and track and field. He earned a Bachelor of Science degree from Catholic University in 1912. He also attended Georgetown University Law Center in 1911, and was a member of the 1911 Georgetown Blue and Gray football team.

In 1912, Greer was an assistant football coach at Catholic University under Harry McDevitt. The following year, he succeeded McDevitt as head football coach. In 1914, Greer went to Roman Catholic High School in Philadelphia to serve as the school's athletic director, and coach football and baseball. Greer was hired as the football coach at Salesianum School, located in Wilmington, Delaware, in 1924. He was succeed at Salesianum in 1926 by Johnny Oakes.

Greer worked for 20 years as a sales manager for a school book publishing company. He died on November 24, 1932, after suffering a heart attack while officiating a football game at Upper Darby High School in Upper Darby Township, Pennsylvania.

== Head coaching record ==
=== College ===
Year	Team	Overall	Conference	Standing	Bowl/playoffs
Catholic University Cardinals (Independent) (1913)
1913	Catholic University	1–4–1			
Catholic University:		1–4–1			
Total:		1–4–1			
