= John Green (Australian footballer) =

Australian rules footballer

Personal information
- Full name: John Victor Green
- Born: 2 March 1885; Williamstown, Victoria
- Died: 27 May 1949 (aged 64); Oakleigh, Victoria
- Original team: Collingwood Juniors

Playing career^{1}
Years	Club	Games (Goals)
1906	Essendon	3 (0)
- ^{1} Playing statistics correct to the end of 1906.

John Victor Green (2 March 1885 – 27 May 1949) was an Australian rules footballer who played with Essendon in the Victorian Football League (VFL).
