= Naser Taher =

Jordanian businessman (born 1952)

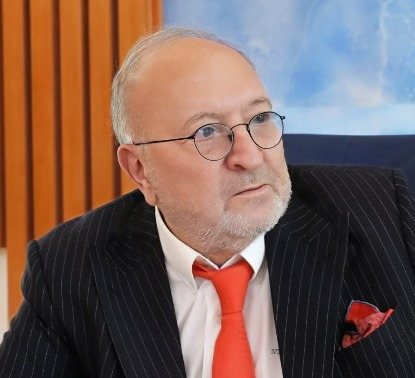
- Born: 1952 (age 73–74); Jordan
- Education: University of Sheffield (M.Eng)
- Occupation: Businessman
- Years active: 1970s–present
- Known for: Founder and Chairman of MultiBank Group
- Awards: Le Fonti Award (2023); Enterprise Agility Award (2024)

Naser Taher (born 1952) is a Jordanian-born businessman who is the founder and chairman of MultiBank Group.

== Early life and education ==
Naser Taher was born in 1952 in Jordan. He pursued his education in the United Kingdom during the 1970s and earned a Bachelor of Engineering degree in mechanical engineering and a Master of Engineering degree in automatic feedback control from the University of Sheffield.

== Career ==
After his education, Taher joined his family business in Jordan as vice chairman, where he focused on investments, electronics, and foodstuff trading. During the 1980s and 1990s, he oversaw projects such as the construction of a 180-kilometer six-lane highway between Jordan and Iraq and contributed to the establishment of Air VIA, a private airline company in Eastern Europe.

Taher later worked with major global financial institutions, BNP Paribas, Barclays, UBS, Merrill Lynch, Credit Suisse, Citibank, specializing in foreign exchange, electronic banking systems, e-commerce, and corporate finance. During this period, he served as head of the Irish Stock Exchange's development projects in Asia and senior counsellor to the Board of the Tradition Group and gave testimony to the UK House of Lords on trade finance rules.

In 2005, Taher founded MultiBank Group in California as an online brokerage offering foreign-exchange and financial derivatives trading services. The company subsequently operated from Hong Kong before relocating its headquarters to Dubai in late 2022.

In 2013, Naser was appointed Honorary Chief Financial Advisor to the local government of Tianjin, for which he received the Tianjin "Haihe Friendship" award, and in 2016, he was named a senior advisor to China's Central Financial Government.

== Awards and recognition ==
- Le Fonti Award (2023)
- Enterprise Agility Award (2024)
