= Hugo Laviada =

Mexican politician

Hugo Antonio Laviada Molina (born October 31, 1961, in Mérida, Yucatán) is a Mexican politician from Yucatán affiliated with the National Action Party who serves in the upper house of the Mexican Congress.

== Personal life and education ==
Laviada studied medicine in the Autonomous University of Yucatán where he obtained his medical degree. Subsequently, he obtained a master of medical science from the University of Sheffield.

== Political career ==
Laviada is a member of the National Action Party since 1981.

During the 2006 congressional elections he ran as substitute senator of candidate Beatriz Zavala; Zavala won the election but left that position in November 2006 to join President Calderón's cabinet, thus Laviada has been serving as senator for the LX and LXI Legislatures (2006–2012).
