= Brit Miller =

American football player (born 1986)

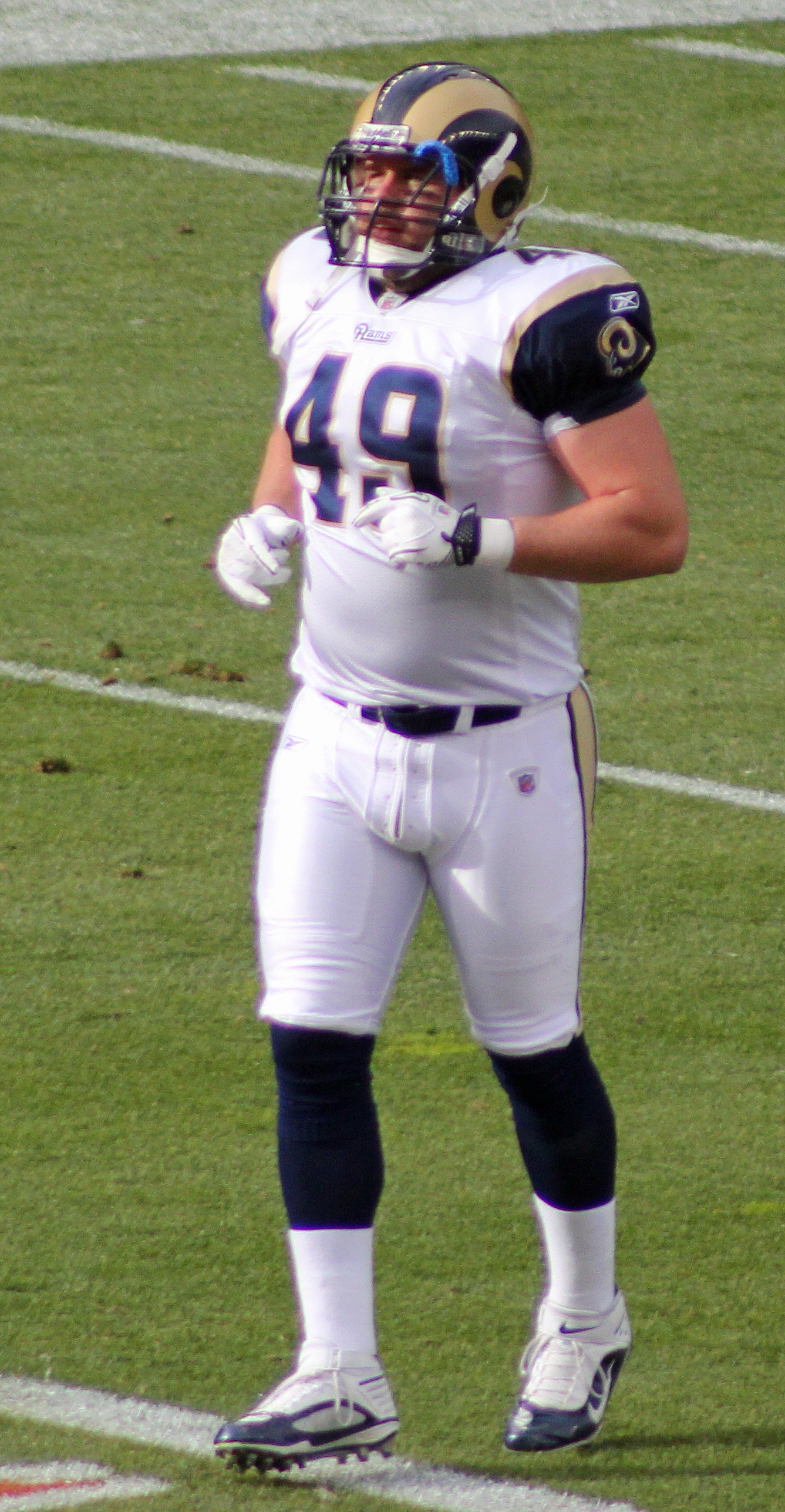
- Miller with the St. Louis Rams in 2010

No. 47, 49
- Position: Fullback

Personal information
- Born: September 15, 1986 (age 40); Decatur, Illinois, U.S.
- Listed height: 6 ft 1 in (1.85 m)
- Listed weight: 250 lb (113 kg)

Career information
- High school: Eisenhower (Decatur)
- College: Illinois
- NFL draft: 2009: undrafted

Career history
- Carolina Panthers (2009)*; San Francisco 49ers (2009); St. Louis Rams (2010−2012)
- * Offseason or practice squad member only

Awards and highlights
- First-team All-Big Ten (2008); AFCA Good Works Team (2008)

Career NFL statistics
- Rushing attempts: 5
- Rushing yards: 14
- Receptions: 3
- Receiving yards: 41
- Stats at Pro Football Reference

Brit William Miller (born September 15, 1986) is an American former professional football player who was a fullback in the National Football League (NFL). He played college football for the Illinois Fighting Illini. Following college, Miller was signed by the Carolina Panthers as an undrafted free agent in 2009. He was also a member of the San Francisco 49ers and St. Louis Rams.

== Early life ==
Miller was born in Decatur, Illinois and attended high school at Eisenhower High School in the same city.

== College career ==
Miller played college football for the Illinois Fighting Illini, playing at linebacker.

== Professional career ==
Pre-draft measurables
Height	Weight	40-yard dash	10-yard split	20-yard split	20-yard shuttle	Three-cone drill	Vertical jump	Broad jump	Bench press
5 ft 11 7/8 in (1.83 m)	243 lb (110 kg)	4.62 s	1.56 s	2.71 s	4.52 s	7.01 s	29 in (0.74 m)	9 ft 4 in (2.84 m)	24 reps
All values from Illinois's Pro Day

=== Carolina Panthers ===
Miller went undrafted in the 2009 NFL draft, but was signed as undrafted free agent by the Carolina Panthers, where he was later waived.

=== San Francisco 49ers ===
Miller was signed by the San Francisco 49ers and was switched to fullback with the 49ers. He was promoted to the active roster on December 1, 2009. He was waived on September 3, 2010, during final roster cuts.

=== St. Louis Rams ===
Miller was signed to the St. Louis Rams' practice squad on September 15, 2010, and was released on November 20, 2012.
