= Jonathan Green (medical writer) =

British medical writer (c.1788–1864)

Jonathan Green, M.D. (c.1788–1864) was a British medical writer.

== Life ==
Green was born about 1788, and became a member of the Royal College of Surgeons of England on 7 December 1810; his degree of M.D. was obtained from Heidelberg University in 1834. In 1835 he was elected a fellow of the Royal Medical and Chirurgical Society.

For some years Green served as a surgeon in the navy, and acquired a reputation as a specialist in skin diseases. On retiring from the service he visited Paris, to examine the fumigating baths established by order of the French government. On his return to London he opened in 1823 an establishment for fumigating and other baths at 5 Bury Street, St. James's. He also patented a portable vapour bath. In December 1825 he moved to 40 Great Marlborough Street, but was not ultimately successful.

Green became an inmate of the Charterhouse, where he died on 23 February 1864, aged 76.

== Works ==
Green wrote:

- The Utility and Importance of Fumigating Baths illustrated; or a Series of Facts and Remarks, shewing the Origin, Progress, and final Establishment (by order of the French Government) of the practice of Fumigations for the Cure of various Diseases, London, 1823.
- A short Illustration of the Advantages derived by the use of Sulphurous Fumigating, Hot Air, and Vapour Baths, London, 1825.
- Some Observations on the utility of Fumigating and other Baths. [...] With a Summary of ... Cases, London, 1831; another edition London, 1835.
- A Practical Compendium of the Diseases of the Skin, with Cases, London, 1835.
- On the Utility and Safety of the Fumigating Bath as a remedial agent in Complaints of the Skin. Joints, Rheumatism, London, 1847.
- An improved Method of employing Mercury by Fumigation to the whole body, London, 1852.
