= Loren D. Hagen =

United States Army Medal of Honor recipient

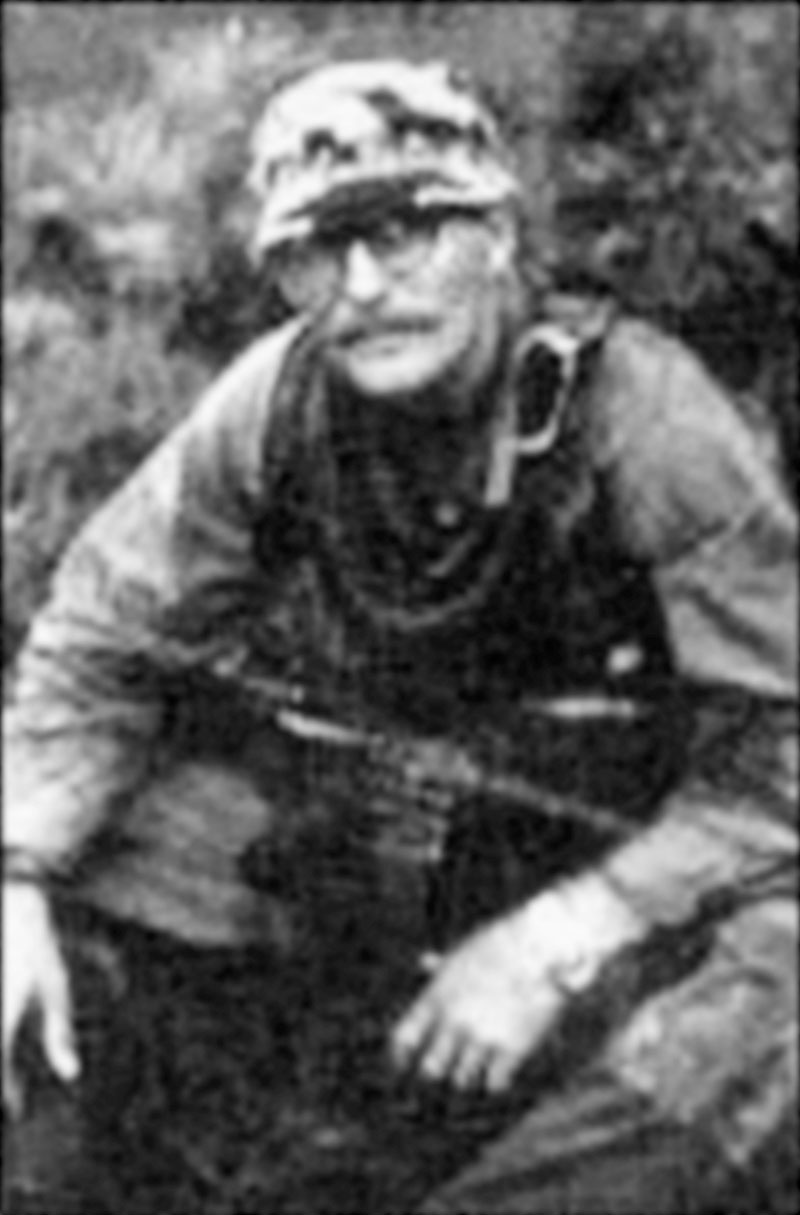
- Loren Hagen in Vietnam, 1971
- Born: February 25, 1946; Fargo, North Dakota, US
- Died: August 7, 1971 (aged 25); A Shau Valley, Republic of Vietnam
- Burial place: Arlington National Cemetery
- Military career
- Allegiance: United States of America
- Branch: United States Army
- Service years: 1968–1971
- Rank: First Lieutenant
- Nickname: "Festus"
- Units: 5th Special Forces Group; MACV-SOG
- Conflicts: Vietnam War †
- Awards: Medal of Honor; Purple Heart

Loren Douglas Hagen (February 25, 1946 – August 7, 1971) was a United States Army Special Forces officer and a recipient of the United States military's highest decoration—the Medal of Honor—for his actions during the Vietnam War as Recon Team (RT) leader of a small special reconnaissance unit "RT Kansas", manned by USASF Green Berets and highly trained Montagnard commandos from Task Force One Advisory Element aka Command & Control North, a division of Studies and Observations Group in the Vietnam War.

== Biography ==
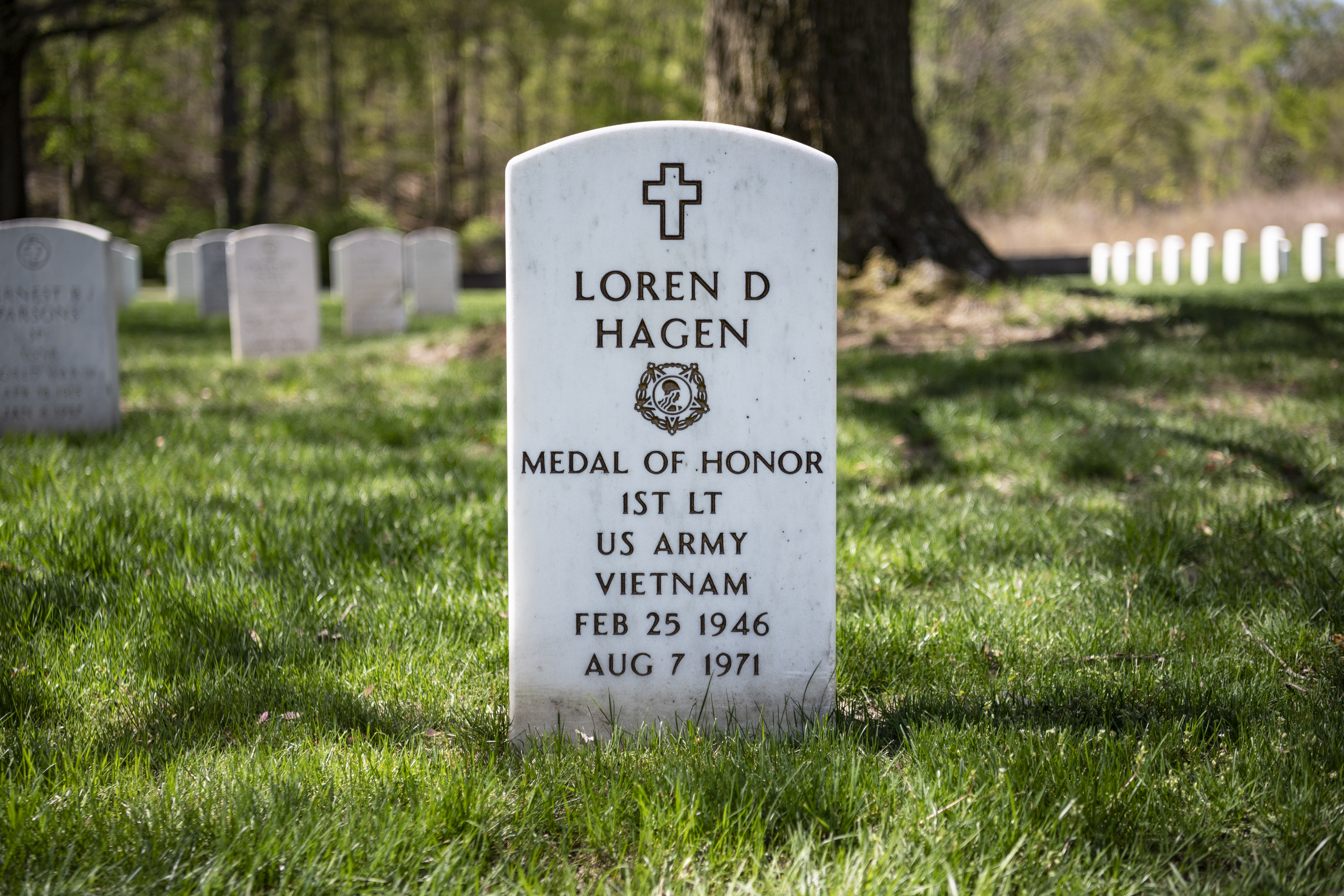
Grave at Arlington National Cemetery

Hagen was born February 25, 1946, in Fargo, North Dakota, son of Loren H. Hagen (1919–2002) and Eunice H. Harris Hagen (1921–2008). The family lived in Moorhead, Minnesota, where he worked summers as a farm laborer and as a lifeguard. He is an Eagle Scout and was credited with saving the life of a swimmer at the Moorhead swimming pool in 1968. He had two brothers: Michael and Jeffrey.

His father was transferred to Decatur, Illinois, his sophomore year of high school. He attended MacArthur High School in Decatur, where he was student council president and graduated in 1964. After high school he returned to Minnesota and enrolled at North Dakota State University, where he received a Bachelor of Science degree in engineering, industrial science and math. After college, he enlisted in the U.S. Army. He attended Officer Candidate School (OCS) at Fort Belvoir, Virginia, and then was trained at Fort Bragg, North Carolina, and became a member of the 5th Special Forces, Green Berets.

== Career and command ==
Hagen joined the Army from his birth city of Fargo, North Dakota in 1968, and by August 7, 1971 was serving as a first lieutenant in command of special Recon Team (RT) Kansas, a mixed unit of U.S. Army Special Forces and Montagnard commandos from Task Force One Advisory Element (TF1AE), also known as Command & Control North (CCN) with MACV-SOG (name changed in March 1971 to "TAG" Training Advisory Group, U.S. Army).

== Facing massed NVA forces ==
Hagen's special reconnaissance team had landed and secured their position for the overnight mission almost within sight of the Hanoi High Command's most critical new venture of late 1971, the first six-inch fuel pipeline laid across the Vietnamese DMZ, which was essential a few months in the future when entire tank battalions rolled through the area for the Vietnam War's largest offensive. The North Vietnamese Army (NVA) 304th Division was already massing there, plus a regiment of the 308th Division, in preparation for the 1972 Easter Offensive.

== Enemy attack ==
During an enemy attack on August 7, in an assembly area of the North Vietnamese Army in the A Shau Valley of the Republic of Vietnam, Hagen led his small recon team's defense, and when USASF Sgt. Bruce Allen Berg was hit by a rocket in one of the team's bunkers, Hagen crawled towards Berg's position through heavy fire in an attempt to assist Berg, returning fire as he proceeded. Mortally wounded in the process, Hagen was later posthumously awarded the Medal of Honor for his actions. Berg was never found and he was initially listed as Missing in Action, Body Not Recovered. Berg was 21 at the time of his loss. He was later declared Killed in Action, Body Not Recovered (KIA/BNR).

Other members of Recon Team Kansas were: USASF SSG Oran Bingham, USASF SGT William R. "Bill" Queen (DSC awarded for his actions), USASF SGT Bruce Allen Berg, USASF SGT William "Bill" Rimondi, USASF SGT Anthony G. "Tony Andersen" (DSC awarded for his actions), and eight Bru Degar (Montagnard) Commandos (no names available).

Hagen, aged 25 at his death, was buried at Arlington National Cemetery, Arlington County, Virginia.

== Medal of Honor citation ==
Army version of the Medal of Honor

First Lieutenant Hagen's official Medal of Honor citation reads:

1st Lt. Hagen distinguished himself in action while serving as the team leader of a small special reconnaissance team operating deep within enemy-held territory. At approximately 0630 hours on the morning of 7 August 1971 the small team came under a fierce assault by a superior-sized enemy force using heavy small arms, automatic weapons, mortar, and rocket fire. 1st Lt. Hagen immediately began returning small-arms fire upon the attackers and successfully led this team in repelling the first enemy onslaught. He then quickly deployed his men into more strategic defense locations before the enemy struck again in an attempt to overrun and annihilate the beleaguered team's members. 1st Lt. Hagen repeatedly exposed himself to the enemy fire directed at him as he constantly moved about the team's perimeter, directing fire, rallying the members, and resupplying the team with ammunition, while courageously returning small arms and hand grenade fire in a valorous attempt to repel the advancing enemy force. The courageous actions and expert leadership abilities of 1st Lt. Hagen were a great source of inspiration and instilled confidence in the team members. After observing an enemy rocket make a direct hit on and destroy 1 of the team's bunkers, 1st Lt. Hagen moved toward the wrecked bunker in search for team members despite the fact that the enemy force now controlled the bunker area. With total disregard for his own personal safety, he crawled through the enemy fire while returning small-arms fire upon the enemy force. Undaunted by the enemy rockets and grenades impacting all around him, 1st Lt. Hagen desperately advanced upon the destroyed bunker until he was fatally wounded by enemy small arms and automatic weapons fire. With complete disregard for his personal safety, 1st Lt. Hagen's courageous gallantry, extraordinary heroism, and intrepidity above and beyond the call of duty, at the cost of his own life, were in keeping with the highest traditions of the military service and reflect great credit upon him and the U.S. Army.

== Awards and decorations ==
1LT Hagen was awarded the following throughout his military career:

Badge	Combat Infantryman Badge		
1st row	Medal of Honor		Purple Heart
2nd row	National Defense Service Medal	Vietnam Service Medal with two Campaign stars	Republic of Vietnam Campaign Medal with "60-" device
Badges	Special Forces Tab		Master Parachutist Badge

== See also ==
- A Shau Valley
- List of Medal of Honor recipients for the Vietnam War
