= MacArthur High School (Decatur, Illinois) =

Douglas MacArthur High School

Location
- 1499 W Grand Ave; Decatur, Illinois 62522; United States; 39.85313°N 88.97949°W

Information
- Type: Public
- School district: Decatur Public Schools District 61
- NCES District ID: 1711850
- NCES School ID: 171185001411
- Principal: Cordell Ingram
- Teaching staff: 53.00 (on an FTE basis)
- Grades: 9–12
- Gender: Co-ed
- Enrollment: 1,042 (2023-2024)
- Student to teacher ratio: 19.66
- Campus type: Urban
- Colors: Royal Blue; Silver
- Athletics: IHSA
- Athletics conference: Central State Eight Conference
- Team name: Generals
- Rival: Eisenhower High School
- Newspaper: General Gazette
- Website: mhs.dps61.org

Douglas MacArthur High School is a public high school located in Decatur, Illinois. The school serves about 1,042 students from grades 9 to 12 in Decatur Public Schools District 61.

== History ==
Built in 1957, MacArthur High School was named for General Douglas MacArthur, an American army officer. Correspondingly, the school's sports teams' nickname is the Generals.

== Demographics ==
As of the 2020 school year, the enrollment was 1,090 students. The racial makeup of the school in 2020 was 54.5.7% African American, 37.3% White, 5.5% Hispanic, 1.4% Asian, 0.7% Two or more races 0.3% Native American, and 0.3% Pacific Islander. 66.3% of the student population are low income students.

== Academics ==
In 2008, 36.8% of the student population met or exceeded in all subjects. The school did not make Adequate Yearly Progress (AYP) as defined by federal and state laws in 2008. In 2008, the high school graduation rate was 92.3%, up from 76.6% in 2007. The dropout rate lowered from 10.8% in 2007 to 2.5% in 2008.

== Athletics ==
MacArthur High School is a member of the Central State Eight Conference. MacArthur fields teams in Baseball, Basketball, Bowling, Cheerleading, Cross Country, Football, Golf, Soccer, Softball, Tennis, Track & Field, Volleyball and Wrestling.

== Notable alumni ==
- Brian Culbertson, musician, funk-based instrumentalist, jazz artist (Class of 1991)
- Loren Coleman, cryptozoologist, author, television personality (Class of 1965)
- L. Douglas Hagen (1946 - 1971), US Army Special Forces Green Beret and Medal of Honor recipient (Class of 1964)
- Steve Hunter, musician, guitarist, played with Mitch Ryder, Lou Reed, Alice Cooper, Peter Gabriel and others (Class of 1966)
- David Joyner, actor
- James W. Loewen, (1942-2021) sociologist, historian and author (class of 1960)
