= Jonathan Green (painter) =

American painter (born 1955)

- Born: August 9, 1955 (age 71); Gardens Corner, South Carolina
- Citizenship: American
- Occupation: Visual artist
- Known for: painting Gullah culture

Jonathan Green (born August 9, 1955) is an African American painter known for his works on Gullah culture.

== Biography ==
Jonathan Green was born on August 9, 1955, in Gardens Corner, South Carolina, a Gullah community located near the South Carolina Sea Islands. He is of Gullah descent, a cultural group formed by the descendants of enslaved Africans who settled in the Lowcountry region spanning from northern Florida to North Carolina.

Green was raised by his maternal grandmother, Eloise Stewart Johnson, and influenced by the traditions of Gullah culture, which were passed down through oral storytelling.

Green attended Beaufort High School. After graduating, he joined the U.S. Air Force. He later pursued formal training in the visual arts at the School of the Art Institute of Chicago, where he earned a Bachelor of Fine Arts (BFA) degree in 1982.

Since 1982, Green has participated in traveling exhibitions across the United States and has held solo exhibitions. His work is part of the permanent collections of institutions including the Morris Museum of Art in Georgia, African American Museum in Philadelphia, Naples Museum of Art in Florida, and IFCC Cultural Center in Oregon. His paintings have also been exhibited in museums and galleries across North America, Europe, Central and South America, the Caribbean, Africa, and Japan.

In 1996, Green was awarded an honorary doctorate from the University of South Carolina, the same year his book Gullah Images: The Art of Jonathan Green was published. In 2009, he received the NAACP's Key of Life Award at the organization's 40th Image Awards in recognition of his achievements in the visual arts. His second book, Gullah Spirit: The Art of Jonathan Green, was published in 2021.

Green was the life partner of art collector, historian and philanthropist Richard Weedman, who was also his studio manager. In 2021, the Gibbes Museum of Art awarded Weedman and Green the James Shoolbred Gibbes Philanthropy Award.

== Selected Exhibitions ==
=== Solo Exhibitions ===
- King-Tisdell Cottage, Savannah, GA (1985)
- Woodson Regional Library, Chicago, IL (1984, 1985)
- Uptown Federal Building, Chicago, IL (1982)

=== Group Exhibitions ===
- Emerging 1985, The Renaissance Society, State of Illinois Art Center, Chicago, IL (1985)
- Five Plus Five: Ten Perspectives in Black Art, Chicago Cultural Center, Chicago, IL (1984)
- Black Antecedence, The School of the Art Institute of Chicago, IL (1983)
- 1984 Black Creativity Exhibition, The Museum of Science & Industry, Chicago, IL (1983)

=== Public Collections ===
Green’s artwork is featured in several prominent museums and collections, including:

- McKissick Museum, Columbia, SC
- The African American Museum in Philadelphia, Philadelphia, PA
- Evans-Tibbs Collection, Washington, DC
- The King-Tisdell Cottage Museum, Savannah, GA

== Honors and Recognition ==
Sources:

- Honored in Savannah, Georgia, for visual documentation of Southern culture, 1985
- Received the Chatham County Medallion in Savannah for artistic and cultural contributions, 1988
- Awarded the Penn Center Heritage Resolution for artistic renditions of Gullah life, 1992
- Received the Humanitarian Award in Beaufort, South Carolina, 1993
- Awarded an honorary doctorate in Fine Arts from the University of South Carolina, 1996
- Presented with the Alberta G. Peacock Award in Naples, Florida, for contributions to the arts, 1996
- Received the Clementa C. Pinckney Award from the South Carolina House of Representatives for outstanding contributions to the arts, 1997
- Awarded a Certificate of Honor in Portland, Oregon, for work expressing Gullah culture, 1997
- Recognized with the Order of the Palmetto, South Carolina’s highest civilian honor, 1998
- Received the History Makers Award in the Fine Arts in Chicago, 2002
- Honored with the Museum of the Americas Century of Achievement Award and the Education Foundation of Collier County’s Man of Distinction Award, 2003
- Appointed Ambassador for the Arts by Charleston Mayor John Tecklenburg, recognizing lasting influence on the cultural landscape, 2017
