= John L. Green Jr. =

American academic administrator

John Lafayette Green Jr.
- Born: April 3, 1929; Trenton, New Jersey, United States
- Died: January 5, 2021 (aged 91)
- Occupation: Academic administrator

Academic background
- Education: Mississippi State University

Academic work
- Institutions: University of Miami
- Main interests: Teaching
- Notable works: Founder of the Accreditation Council for Business Schools and Programs and the International Accreditation Council for Business Education

John Lafayette Green Jr. (April 3, 1929 – January 5, 2021) was an American academic administrator who was executive vice president at the University of Miami from 1976 to 1980, president of Washburn University from 1981 to 1988, and founder of the Accreditation Council for Business Schools and Programs and the International Accreditation Council for Business Education.

== Early life ==
Green was born on April 3, 1929, in Trenton, New Jersey. He grew up in Kansas City, Missouri and Topeka, Kansas. During the Korean War, he served in the United States Army's 2nd Armored Division. He earned his Bachelor of Arts degree from Mississippi State University in 1955.

== Career ==
From 1955 to 1957, Green was an assistant to the treasurer of International Paper. From 1957 to 1965, he was a member of the faculty at the University of California, Berkeley. In 1965, Green became vice president at the University of Georgia. He earned his Master of Education degree from Wayne State University in 1971 and became a VP at Rensselaer Polytechnic Institute that same year. He earned his Ph.D. from RPI in 1974.

From 1976 to 1980, Green was an executive vice president at the University of Miami. He served as the school's chief financial officer and oversaw the athletic department. He thought the Miami Hurricanes could become a big time football program and in 1977, hired former NFL coach Lou Saban. When Saban left in 1979, the university's board of trustees considered moving the football program down to the Division I-AA level, or even eliminating it altogether. Green successfully convinced the board to give Division I-A football another shot and hired Howard Schnellenberger to replace Saban. Schnellenberger led Miami to the first of its five national championships in 1983.

From 1980 to 1981, Green was a senior vice president at the University of Houston. In 1981, he became president of Washburn University, a municipal university in Topeka. During his tenure, the university established the School of Applied Studies and Continuing Education, split the School of Nursing from the College of Arts and Sciences, and constructed West Hall, Petro Allied Health Center, and the Bennett Computer Center. Athletic success followed Green to Washburn, as the Ichabods won the 1987 NAIA men's basketball tournament. He remained at Washburn until his contract expired on July 1, 1988. He felt there was a good chance the school would be absorbed by the Kansas Legislature into the state university system and wanted the Kansas Board of Regents to be able to select their own president.

After leaving Washburn, Green founded two higher education accreditation bodies — the Accreditation Council for Business Schools and Programs in 1989 and the International Accreditation Council for Business Education in 1997. He died on January 5, 2021.
