= Laura Kay =

English writer, journalist and editor

- Born: 1989 (age 36–37)
- Education: University of Sheffield
- Occupations: Author, journalist, editor
- Notable work: The Split (2021)
- Awards: Polari Prize; 2021 – Longlist (The Split)
- Website: https://www.laurakayauthor.co.uk/

Laura Kay (born 1989) is an English writer, journalist and editor. Her debut novel The Split, reached the longlist for the Polari Prize. She has written for Diva Magazine, The Guardian, and Stylist.

Kay went to college in Sheffield where she gained a master's degree in history. She is based in London. Kay was selected in 2018 for Penguin's PRH WriteNow scheme where she worked on her first novel. She writes about queer characters, in part, because she herself identifies as queer.

== Bibliography ==
- Kay, Laura (February 22, 2021). The Split. Quercus. ASIN B097MGKQBT. ISBN 978-1529409833.
- Kay, Laura (May 26, 2022). Tell Me Everything. Quercus. ASIN B098NJFCSK. ISBN 978-1529409888.
- Kay, Laura (May 23, 2023). Wild Things. Vintage Books. ASIN B0BGD8SF6S. ISBN 978-0593470060.
- Kay, Laura (July 2, 2024). Making It. Vintage Books. ASIN B0CH9K43J8. ISBN 978-0593470084.
- Laura, Kay. The Point of it all. Simon & Schuster.
