= John W. Greer Jr. =

American politician

John Wesley Greer Jr. (March 25, 1909 – March 18, 1994) was an American politician. He served in the Georgia House of Representatives from 1945–1954 and from 1971–1988 and served in the state Senate from 1959–1960. In the House, he represented both rural Lanier County and urban Fulton County.

Greer authored legislation prohibiting members of the Ku Klux Klan from wearing masks and legislation authorizing a 1% sales tax for the Metropolitan Atlanta Rapid Transit Authority. The MARTA station located at the Atlanta Hartsfield International Airport is dedicated to him.
