= John Green (educationalist) =

British educationalist (1867–1922)

John Alfred Green (15 October 1867 – 12 March 1922) was a British educationalist, professor of education at Sheffield University.
