= John Allen Greer =

American politician (1874–1941)

John A. Greer

Member of the Tennessee Senate from the 20th district
- In office 1909–1911
- Preceded by: William B. Greenlaw
- Succeeded by: Tenant Brown

Personal details
- Born: 1874 Lobelville, Tennessee, US
- Died: 1941 (aged 66–67) Memphis, Tennessee, US
- Resting place: Fairview Cemetery, Newbern, Tennessee
- Party: Democratic Party (United States)
- Spouse: Mary Jones Greer
- Children: 1
- Education: Cumberland University
- Profession: Politician, lawyer

John Allen Greer (1874–1941) was an American politician and attorney. Greer was member of the Tennessee State Senate representing Tennessee's 20th Senate district, composed of Lewis County, Maury County, and Perry County from 1909 to 1911. During his time in state government he was a prominent advocate of alcohol prohibition.
