= John Green (sociologist) =

American professor of sociology

John J. Green is an American professor of sociology. Since August 2021, he has served as the director of the Southern Rural Development Center, housed at Mississippi State University.

== Education and personal life ==
Green is originally from Decatur, Illinois. Green attended Mississippi State University for both his bachelor's degree and master's degree. His bachelor's was in Political Science, and his master's was in Sociology. His thesis was on the conflict surrounding the siting of a hazardous waste facility in a rural Mississippi community. He attended University of Missouri-Columbia for his doctorate, which was in Rural Sociology. His dissertation was on evaluating the social movement for grassroots economic development led by community-based cooperative organizations.

Green is married to Eleanor M. Green, who is also a sociologist by training. They own a farm together and have two adult children: a son who teaches high school physics, and a daughter who is a PhD student studying population health.

== Work ==
Green joined the Division of Social Sciences at Delta State University in 2002 as an Assistant Professor of Sociology and Community Development. He was promoted to Associate Professor. He also served as Interim Chair of the Division of Social Sciences, Acting Chair of History, and Director of the Institute for Community Based Research.

In 2011, he relocated to the University of Mississippi. He is a Professor of Sociology and formerly served as Director of the Center for Population Studies and the State Data Center of Mississippi at the university. He then served as a senior research associate with the Center.

He has held formal leadership roles in the Community Development Society, Southern Rural Sociological Association, Rural Sociological Society, and the Alabama-Mississippi Sociological Association. He also served as Editor-In-Chief for the Community Development Society's journal for two terms. At the University of Mississippi, he was affiliated with the University of Mississippi School of Law. He was also the director of the Minor for Society and Health. He worked with the Interdisciplinary Graduate Minor in Applied Statistics Committee. Additionally, he worked with the Flagship Constellations project at UM.

He is also an advisor for the Mississippi Delta Project at Harvard Law School.

Green's research focuses on the American South. However, he mostly does research in the state of Mississippi. His work covers applied and community-based research frameworks. He has also worked in Hawaii and the U.S. Affiliated Pacific Islands, especially Guam, Saipan, and American Samoa.

In October 2019 he was named as the Vice-Chairman of the Mississippi Complete Count Committee for the 2020 Census. Additionally, he was the program scholar with the Mississippi Humanities Council and the Museum on Main Street Smithsonian Institution’s traveling exhibit, Crossroads: Change in Rural America.

In spring 2021, he was named as the new head of the Southern Rural Development Center, located at Mississippi State University.

Green served as president of the Rural Sociological Society from 2022-2023.He has been a member for over two decades and had previously headed various committees and served as vice president for the organization.

== Writing and awards ==
He has authored/co-authored published articles for peer-reviewed journals including Agroforestry Systems, Community Development, Journal of Primary Care and Community Health, Rural Sociology, Sociological Spectrum, and Southern Rural Sociology, along with book chapters in several edited volumes. He co-authored a chapter on “Action Research and Evaluation” in the Introduction to Community Development textbook. Other books he has written a chapter for include Community Development Reader, Introduction to Community Development, Sociology of Katrina, The Politics of Globalization, and Cultivating Food Justice. He also served as the editor-in-chief of Community Development, a peer-reviewed journal of the Community Development Society, for five years.

In October 2018, he and fellow researchers at the University of Mississippi published "Microaggressions at the University of Mississippi," which was a part of the UM Race Diary project. The report garnered some controversy from some conservatives.

In August 2019 he wrote an article for The Conversation entitled "Why the 2020 census matters for rural Americans."

Green has been awarded the Delta State University Foundation Prizes for Excellence in Service and for Excellence in Research, the Rural Sociological Society’s Award for Excellence in Extension and Public Outreach, and the Community Development Society’s Ted K. Bradshaw Outstanding Research Award. Additionally, in 2018 he was awarded the Research, Scholarship, and Creative Achievement Award from the UM College of Liberal Arts.
