= Kevin Roberson (baseball) =

American baseball player (born 1968)

- Outfielder
- Born: January 29, 1968 (age 58); Decatur, Illinois, U.S.
- Batted: Both Threw: Right

MLB debut
- July 15, 1993, for the Chicago Cubs

Last MLB appearance
- May 28, 1996, for the New York Mets

MLB statistics
- Batting average: .197
- Home runs: 20
- Runs batted in: 51

Teams
- Chicago Cubs (1993–1995); New York Mets (1996)

Kevin Lynn Roberson (born January 29, 1968) is a former professional baseball player. He played from 1993 to 1996 for the Chicago Cubs and New York Mets of Major League Baseball (MLB). He was an outfielder. When Roberson hit a home run, broadcaster Harry Caray would declare, "They're dancing in the streets in Decatur, Illinois!"
