= Pearlie Evans =

American civil rights activist

Pearlie Evans

Pearlie Evans (died November 18, 2016, at age 84) was a political strategist and civil rights activist in St. Louis, Missouri. She headed Congressman Bill Clay’s district office. She is profiled in Lift Every Voice and Sing.

She lived in North St. Louis.

She graduated from the George Warren Brown School of Social Work at Washington University in St. Louis.
