= John W. Green (Missouri politician) =

US politician

John W. Green was a state legislator in Missouri who supported civil rights. He was one of the members of the Missouri House of Representatives who pushed through a bill desegregating Missouri's public schools.

He lived in St. Louis. He supported a bill to end segregation in public schools in Missouri. He was African American. A Democrat he represented the 17th District from 1948 to 1954. He was convicted of taking money under false pretenses to help get someone paroled.
