= Age discrimination in the United States =

Age discrimination involves treating a person less favorably than others because of their age. In the United States, all states have passed laws that restrict age discrimination, and age discrimination is restricted under federal laws such as the Age Discrimination in Employment Act of 1967 (ADEA).

== Alcoholic beverages ==
In the United States, the minimum legal age to purchase alcoholic beverages has been 21 years of age since shortly after the passage of the National Minimum Drinking Age Act in 1984. The two exceptions are Puerto Rico and the Virgin Islands where the age is 18. The legal drinking age varies by state, and many states have no age requirements for supervised drinking with one's parents or legal guardians.

Seventeen states (Arkansas, California, Connecticut, Florida, Kentucky, Maryland, Massachusetts, Mississippi, Missouri, Nevada, New Hampshire, New Mexico, New York, Oklahoma, Rhode Island, South Carolina, and Wyoming) and the District of Columbia have laws against possession of alcohol by minors, but they do not prohibit its consumption by minors.

Fourteen states (Alaska, Colorado, Delaware, Illinois, Louisiana, Maine, Minnesota, Missouri, Montana, Ohio, Oregon, Texas, Wisconsin, and Virginia) specifically permit minors to drink alcohol given to them by their parents or by someone entrusted by their parents.

Many states also permit the drinking of alcohol under the age of 21 for religious or health reasons.

The National Minimum Drinking Age Act (23 U.S.C. § 158) was passed by the United States Congress and was later signed into law by President Ronald Reagan on July 17, 1984; it punished any state that allowed persons under 21 years to purchase alcoholic beverages by reducing its annual federal highway apportionment by 10 percent. The law was upheld in the Supreme Court case South Dakota v. Dole, 483 U.S. 203 (1987). The law was later amended, lowering the penalty to 8 percent from fiscal year 2012 and beyond.

United States customs laws stipulate that no person under the age of 21 may bring any type or quantity of alcohol into the country.

== Credit transactions ==
The Equal Credit Opportunity Act (ECOA) is a United States law (codified at 15 U.S.C. § 1691 et seq.), enacted 28 October 1974, that makes it unlawful for any creditor to discriminate against any applicant, with respect to any aspect of a credit transaction, based on (among other things) age, provided the applicant has the capacity to contract.

== Elected office ==
Some U.S. political offices have qualifications that discriminate on the basis of age. For example, pursuant to the Constitution of the United States the President of the United States must be at least 35 years old; a United States senator must be at least 30; and a member of the United States House of Representatives must be at least age 25. Most states in the U.S. also have age requirements for the offices of governor, member of a state senate or legislature, or other elected official.

== Employment ==
A 2024 study by AARP shows that 64% of workers over the age of 50 have reported experiencing or witnessing age discrimination in the workplace. The numbers are higher among Black (74%), Latino (62%), and Asian American (67%) workers.

The Age Discrimination in Employment Act of 1967 (ADEA) (29 U.S.C. § 621 to 29 U.S.C. § 634) is a federal law that provides certain employment protections to workers who are over the age of forty, who work for an employer who has twenty or more employees. For protected workers, the ADEA prohibits discrimination at all levels of employment, from recruitment and hiring, through the employment relationship, and through decisions for layoffs or termination of the employment relationship. An age limit may only be legally specified for protected workers in the circumstance where age has been shown to be a "bona fide occupational qualification [BFOQ] reasonably necessary to the normal operation of the particular business" (see 29 U.S.C. § 623(f)(1)). In practice, BFOQs for age are limited to the obvious (hiring a young actor to play a young character in a movie), when a job is physically demanding (police, firefighters, military service), or when public safety is a concern (for example, in the case of age limits for pilots, truck drivers, and bus drivers).

Some states like New York and New Jersey, including District of Columbia have laws that protect younger workers from reverse age discrimination, a practice not prohibited under the ADEA. In these jurisdictions, employers are legally prohibited from discriminating against workers 18 and older for their age unless a bona fide occupational qualification exists (i.e., employers may require bartenders to be at least 21 to comply with the legal drinking age).

In 1968, the Equal Employment Opportunity Commission declared age restrictions on flight attendants' employment to be illegal sex discrimination under Title VII of the Civil Rights Act of 1964.

In July 2024, the state of Colorado passed the "Job Application Fairness Act," which prohibits employers from requesting age-related information, such as date of birth or graduation date, during the early stages of the hiring process. Similar laws also exist in the states of California, Delaware, and Connecticut.

In 2025, United States Immigration and Customs Enforcement (ICE) removed its age requirements, which had required applicants to be at least 21 years old and no older than 37 to 40, depending on the job. It currently requires a minimum age of 18 for applicants.

=== Mandatory retirement ===
Mandatory retirement due to age is generally unlawful in the United States, except in certain industries and occupations that are regulated by law, and are often part of the government (such as military service and federal police agencies, such as the Federal Bureau of Investigation). Minnesota has statutorily established mandatory retirement for all judges at age 70 (more precisely, at the end of the month a judge reaches that age). The Minnesota Legislature has had the constitutional right to set judicial retirement ages since 1956, but did not do so until 1973, setting the age at 70. In 1978, President Jimmy Carter signed a law banning employers from requiring most employees to retire because of age before age 70 and ending mandatory retirement for most federal employees. The Federal Age Discrimination in Employment Act, which became law in 1986, ended mandatory age-related retirement at age 70 for many jobs, not including the Minnesota judiciary; another exception was all postsecondary institutions (colleges, etc.) This exception ended on December 31, 1993. The Fair Treatment for Experienced Pilots Act (Public Law 110-135) went into effect on December 13, 2007, raising the mandatory retirement age for pilots to 65 from the previous 60.

Air traffic controllers have a mandatory retirement age of 56, with exceptions up to age 61. Most air traffic controllers are hired before the age of 31 (the hiring cutoff age for those with experience is 36). United States Foreign Service employees at the Department of State have a mandatory retirement age of 65 with very narrow exceptions. Federal law enforcement officers, national park rangers and firefighters have a mandatory retirement age of 57, or later if they have had less than 20 years of service. For Florida Supreme Court justices, the Florida Constitution establishes mandatory retirement at age 70. Michigan judges of all levels cannot run for election after passing the age of 70. In the New Hampshire Constitution, Article 78 sets the retirement of all judges and sheriffs at age 70. The New Jersey Supreme Court has established mandatory retirement at age 70. The Maryland Constitution establishes a mandatory retirement age of 70 for Circuit and Appellate Court judges. Oregon has a mandatory judicial retirement age of 75.

=== Minimum wage ===
In 1986, the Fair Labor Standards Act was amended to allow the United States Secretary of Labor to provide special certificates to allow an employer to pay less than the minimum wage to individuals whose earning or productive capacity is impaired by age, physical or mental deficiency, or injury. These employees must still be paid wages that are related to the individual's productivity and commensurate with those paid to similarly located and employed nonhandicapped workers.

Federal minimum wage laws allow for employers to pay lower wages to young workers. Many state and local minimum wage laws mirror such an age-based, tiered minimum wage.

=== Employment of minors ===
In the United States, a person must generally be at least 14 years old to seek a job, and workers face additional restrictions on their work activities until they reach age 16. Additional age restrictions for workers vary by state. For example, many states require workers under 18 years of age to have work permits and not fulfill occupations deemed hazardous.

=== Notable case law ===
EEOC v. Wyoming, 460 U.S. 226 (1983), is a Supreme Court of the United States case about forcible retirement of an employee of the Wyoming Game and Fish Department. The court held the Age Discrimination in Employment Act of 1967 makes it unlawful for an employer to discriminate against any employee or potential employee between the ages of 40 and 70 on the basis of age, except "where age is a bona fide occupational qualification reasonably necessary to the normal operation of the particular business. or where the differentiation is based on reasonable factors other than age."

In Western Air Lines, Inc. v. Criswell 472 US 400 (1985), the United States Supreme Court held it was lawful to require airline pilots to retire at 60, because the Federal Aviation Authority forbid using pilots over 60 in aviation. But the Court held that refusing to employ flight engineers over that age was unjustified as there were no such FAA requirements. (Note that The Fair Treatment for Experienced Pilots Act (Public Law 110-135) went into effect on December 13, 2007, raising the mandatory retirement age for pilots to 65 from the previous 60.)

Gilmer v. Interstate/Johnson Lane Corp., 500 U.S. 20 (1991), is a 1991 case in which the Supreme Court of the United States ruled that the Federal Arbitration Act requires enforcement of an arbitration clause to compel arbitration of statutory Age Discrimination in Employment Act of 1967 claims.

Gregory v. Ashcroft, 501 U.S. 452 (1991) was a U.S. Supreme Court case. It concerned a provision in the Missouri state constitution that required state judges to retire at the age of 70, and the court was asked to consider whether it conflicted with the 1967 federal Age Discrimination in Employment Act of 1967 and the Equal Protection Clause of the Fourteenth Amendment to the United States Constitution. The provision was upheld, with the case being one of several Supreme Court decisions supporting the principle that "ambiguous language will not be interpreted to intrude on areas of traditional state authority or important state governmental functions".

DeMarco v. Holy Cross High School 4 F.3d 166 (2nd Cir. 1993) was an employment discrimination case brought under the Age Discrimination in Employment Act of 1967. The appellant, Guy DeMarco, was released from employment prior to his eligibility for tenure at the age of forty-nine. Holy Cross High School argued that it was not subject to Age Discrimination in Employment Act of 1967 law, and if it were that this case against it was in violation of the Free Exercise Clause and the Establishment Clause of the First Amendment. The defendant also argued that the plaintiff failed to utilize the administrative remedies available. The court noted that other anti-discrimination statutes were held to be applicable to religious organizations, with the exception of statutes that prohibited discrimination based on religious belief. Since statutes prohibiting discrimination by race, gender and national origin were already found applicable to religious organizations, it was logical (and a reasonable interpretation of the legislative history) to extend the prohibition against age discrimination to religious organizations as well. The decision of the district court was reversed and the case remanded for further proceedings.

Geary v. Visitation of Blessed Virgin Mary School, 7 F.3d 324 (3d Cir. 1993), was a court case in the United States Court of Appeals for the Third Circuit which considered whether a religious school in Darby, Pennsylvania could be sued for age discrimination. The court determined that the Age Discrimination in Employment Act of 1967 can only apply to an employment action that was taken based on a claim of religious doctrine or tenet if the plaintiff does not challenge the validity of the doctrine or tenet and only asks whether the doctrine or tenet actually motivated the challenged employment action. The court did, however, find that an issue of material fact existed as to whether or not the cancellation of insurance when the plaintiff's Equal Employment Opportunity Commission complaint was filed was retaliatory in nature. The summary judgment of the district court in favor of the school and against the plaintiff was vacated and the case remanded for further fact-finding on this specific issue.

Hazen Paper Co. v. Biggins 507 U.S. 604 (1993) was a United States Supreme Court case in which the court held that a disparate treatment claim cannot succeed unless the employee's protected trait had a determinative influence on the employer's decisionmaking. This case concerned how Hazen Paper fired Biggins, 62, a few weeks before his service would have reached the required number of years for his pension to vest. Biggins sued Hazen Paper alleging a violation of the Age Discrimination in Employment Act of 1967.

Lockheed Corp. v. Spink, 517 U.S. 882 (1996), is a US labor law case, concerning occupational pensions. Mr. Spink was denied full benefits from Lockheed Corporation after being rehired in 1988. He claimed that an amendment of the plan, to exclude people over 61, violated § 406(a)(1)(D) of the Employee Retirement Income Security Act of 1974 (ERISA), which prohibits a fiduciary from causing a plan to engage in a transaction that transfers plan assets to, or involves the use of plan assets for the benefit of, a party in interest. But Justice Thomas, writing for the majority, ruled that employers could amend plans. They were not bound by fiduciary duties while acting as sponsors.

In Kimel v. Florida Bd. of Regents, 528 U.S. 62 (2000), the United States Supreme Court held that state employees cannot sue states for monetary damages under the Age Discrimination in Employment Act of 1967 in federal court. The Equal Employment Opportunity Commission may still enforce the Age Discrimination in Employment Act of 1967 against states, and state employees may still sue state officials for declaratory and injunctive relief.

In Reeves v. Sanderson Plumbing Products, Inc. (2000), the United States Supreme Court emphasized that "a plaintiff’s prima facie case of age discrimination, combined with sufficient evidence to find that the employer’s asserted justification for its action was false, may permit the trier of fact to conclude that the employer unlawfully discriminated," and that the plaintiff need not always introduce additional and independent evidence of discrimination. The Court held that if a reasonable jury determines that an employer's explanation for an employee being dismissed was an excuse for age discrimination, then the employer is liable to the former employee under the Age Discrimination in Employment Act of 1967.

Smith v. City of Jackson, 544 U.S. 228 (2005), was a case decided by the Supreme Court of the United States on March 30, 2005. It concerned the Age Discrimination in Employment Act of 1967 and the disparate impact theory. The Court held that although the theory of disparate impact set forth in Griggs v. Duke Power Co., 401 U.S. 424 (1971) is also applicable under the Age Discrimination in Employment Act of 1967, the Age Discrimination in Employment Act of 1967 is narrower as it permits “otherwise prohibited” actions “where the differentiation is based on reasonable factors other than age.”

Federal Express Corp. v. Holowecki, 552 U.S. 389 (2008), was a case decided by the Supreme Court of the United States on February 27, 2008. The ruling provided guidance on what would constitute an adequate filing under the Age Discrimination in Employment Act of 1967. The Court accepted the Equal Employment Opportunity Commission’s test for determining whether a filing constituted a charge as set forth in its amicus curiae brief as well as internal directives, and decided: “In addition to the information required by the regulations, i.e., an allegation and the name of the charged party, if a filing is to be deemed a charge it must be reasonably construed as a request for the agency to take remedial action to protect the employee’s rights or otherwise settle a dispute between the employer and the employee.” The Court then decided that the documents filed in this case met these requirements.

In Gomez-Perez v. Potter (2008), the United States Supreme Court allowed federal workers who experience retaliation as a result of reporting age discrimination under the law to sue for damages.

Kentucky Retirement Systems v. EEOC, 554 U.S. 135 (2008) is a United States Supreme Court case that ruled Kentucky's retirement system does not amount to age discrimination under the Age Discrimination in Employment Act of 1967 when granting pensions to disabled persons who had not yet reached the permitted retirement age of 55.

The United States Supreme Court, in Meacham v. Knolls Atomic Power Lab, 554 U.S. 84 (2008), held that the employer, not the employee, bears the burden of proving that a layoff or other action that hurts older workers more than others was based not on age but on some other “reasonable factor.”

14 Penn Plaza LLC v. Pyett, 556 U.S. 247 (2009), is a United States labor law case decided by the Supreme Court of the United States on the rights of unionized workers to sue their employer for age discrimination. In this 2009 decision, the Court decided that whenever a union contract "clearly and unmistakably" requires that all age discrimination claims under the Age Discrimination in Employment Act of 1967 be decided through arbitration, then employees subject to that contract cannot have those claims heard in court.

In 2009, the United States Supreme Court issued its opinion on Gross v. FBL Financial Services, Inc.. In a 5–4 opinion, the Court ruled that private-sector plaintiffs must prove that age was the "but for" cause of the adverse employment action they are suing over. That is, the plaintiff must prove that age discrimination was the determining reason for the adverse employment action (e.g. the action would not have been taken 'but for' the plaintiff's age). However, the Supreme Court's opinion did not explicitly mention public-sector workers. A later opinion, University of Texas Southwestern Medical Center v. Nassar (2013) applied the same 'but for' standard to retaliation claims.

In September 2016, California passed state bill AB-1687, an anti-ageism law taking effect on 1 January 2017, requiring "commercial online entertainment employment" services that allow paid subscribers to submit information and resumes (such as IMDbPro), to honor requests to have their ages and birthdays removed. The bill was supported by SAG-AFTRA's former and current presidents Ken Howard and Gabrielle Carteris, who felt that the law would help to reduce ageism in the entertainment industry. On 23 February 2017, U.S. District Judge Vince Girdhari Chhabria issued a stay on the bill pending a further trial, claiming that it was "difficult to imagine how AB 1687 could not violate the First Amendment" because it inhibited the public consumption of factual information. In February 2018, Girdhari ruled that the law was unconstitutional, arguing that the state of California "[had] not shown that partially eliminating one source of age-related information will appreciably diminish the amount of age discrimination occurring in the entertainment industry." The ruling was criticized by SAG-AFTRA, alleging that the court "incorrectly concluded there were no material disputed factual issues, while precluding the parties from acquiring additional evidence or permitting the case to go to trial". The ruling was eventually appealed, but the Ninth Circuit Court of Appeals upheld it in 2020.

Babb v. Wilkie, No. 18-882, 589 U.S. ___ (2020), is a case of the United States Supreme Court in which the justices considered the scope of protections for federal employees in the Age Discrimination in Employment Act of 1967. Specifically, the Court ruled that plaintiffs only need to prove that age was a motivating factor in the decision in order to sue. However, establishing but for causation is still necessary in determining the appropriate remedy. If a plaintiff can establish that the age was the determining factor in the employment outcome, they may be entitled to compensatory damages or other relief relating to the end result of the employment decision.

Our Lady of Guadalupe School v. Morrissey-Berru, 591 U.S. ___ (2020), is a United States Supreme Court case involving the ministerial exception of federal employment discrimination laws. The case extends from the Supreme Court's prior decision in Hosanna-Tabor Evangelical Lutheran Church & School v. Equal Employment Opportunity Commission (2012) which created the ministerial exception based on the Establishment and Free Exercise Clauses of the United States Constitution, asserting that federal discrimination laws cannot be applied to leaders of religious organizations. The Supreme Court case Our Lady of Guadalupe School v. Morrissey-Berru, along with the consolidated St. James School v. Biel (Docket 19-348), both arose from rulings in the United States Court of Appeals for the Ninth Circuit that found that federal discrimination laws do apply to others within a religious organization that serve an important religious function but lack the title or training to be considered a religious leader under Hosanna-Tabor. One of those rulings in the United States Court of Appeals for the Ninth Circuit was the ruling in Morrissey-Berru v. Our Lady of Guadalupe School, in 2019, in which the United States Court of Appeals for the Ninth Circuit allowed a Catholic elementary school teacher's age discrimination suit to move forward. The religious organization challenged that ruling on the basis of Hosanna-Tabor. The Supreme Court ruled in a 7–2 decision called Our Lady of Guadalupe School v. Morrissey-Berru on July 8, 2020 that reversed the Ninth Circuit's ruling, affirming that the principles of Hosanna-Tabor, that a person can be serving an important religious function even if not holding the title or training of a religious leader, satisfied the ministerial exception in employment discrimination.

== Federally funded programs ==
The Older Americans Amendments of 1975 (Pub. L. 94–135) is an Act of the 94th U.S. Congress amending the Older Americans Act of 1965. It prohibits discrimination based on age in programs or activities that receive federal financial assistance, for instance, financial assistance to schools and colleges, provided by the U.S. Department of Education.

== Hate crimes ==
The District of Columbia and twelve states (California, Florida, Iowa, Hawaii, Kansas, Louisiana, Maine, Minnesota, Nebraska, New Mexico, New York, and Vermont) define age as a specific motivation for hate crimes.

== Voting ==
The Twenty-sixth Amendment to the United States Constitution reads:

Section 1. The right of citizens of the United States, who are eighteen years of age or older, to vote shall not be denied or abridged by the United States or by any State on account of age.

Section 2. The Congress shall have power to enforce this article by appropriate legislation.

That amendment was ratified in 1971. Prior to that:

In 1943 and 1955 respectively, the Georgia and Kentucky legislatures approved measures to lower the voting age to 18.

On June 22, 1970, President Richard Nixon signed an extension of the Voting Rights Act of 1965 that required the voting age to be 18 in all federal, state, and local elections. In his statement on signing the extension, Nixon said:

Despite my misgivings about the constitutionality of this one provision, I have signed the bill. I have directed the Attorney General to cooperate fully in expediting a swift court test of the constitutionality of the 18-year-old provision.

Subsequently, Oregon and Texas challenged the law in court, and the case came before the Supreme Court in 1970 as Oregon v. Mitchell. By this time, four states had a minimum voting age below 21: Georgia, Kentucky, Alaska and Hawaii. In Oregon v. Mitchell (1970), the Supreme Court considered whether the voting-age provisions Congress added to the Voting Rights Act in 1970 were constitutional. The Court struck down the provisions that established 18 as the voting age in state and local elections. However, the Court upheld the provision establishing the voting age as 18 in federal elections. The Court was deeply divided in this case, and a majority of justices did not agree on a rationale for the holding. The decision resulted in states being able to maintain 21 as the voting age in state and local elections, but being required to establish separate voter rolls so that voters between 18 and 21 years old could vote in federal elections.

The Voting Accessibility for the Elderly and Handicapped Act (VAEHA) P.L. 98-435, 42 U.S.C. §§ 1973ee–1973ee-6, is a United States law passed in 1984 that mandates easy access for handicapped and elderly persons to voter registration and polling places during federal elections. The law also mandates registration and voting aids, such as printing instructions in large font. In 2015, an amendment was added to the VAEHA stating that a polling official "may allow a voter who is physically disabled or over the age of 70 to move to the front of the line at polling place upon request of the voter".

== Activism ==
The Newsboys Strike of 1899 fought ageist employment practices targeted against youth by large newspaper syndicates in the Northeast. The strikers demonstrated across the city for several days, effectively stopping circulation of the two papers, along with the news distribution for many New England cities. The strike lasted two weeks, causing Pulitzer's New York World to decrease its circulation from 360,000 papers sold per day to 125,000. Although the price of papers was not lowered, the strike was successful in forcing the World and Journal to offer full buybacks to their sellers, thus increasing the amount of money that newsies received for their work.

The American Youth Congress, or AYC, was formed in 1935 to advocate for youth rights in U.S. politics. It ended in 1940.

The AARP was founded in 1958 by Ethel Percy Andrus (a retired educator from California) and Leonard Davis (later the founder of the Colonial Penn Group of insurance companies). Its stated mission is "to empower people to choose how they live as they age". It is an influential lobbying group in the United States focusing largely on issues affecting the elderly.

The Gray Panthers was formed in 1970 by Maggie Kuhn, with a goal of eliminating mandatory retirement; they now work on many social justice issues including eliminating ageism.

Youth Liberation of Ann Arbor was an organization based in Ann Arbor, Michigan. It existed from 1970 to 1979, and is often cited in more recent academic literature as one of the leading forerunners of several youth movements in the United States, including the youth rights movement, youth voice movement, and the youth media movement.

Three O'Clock Lobby formed in 1976 to promote youth participation throughout traditionally ageist government structures in Michigan.

Senior Action in a Gay Environment (SAGE) was incorporated in 1978 by lesbian and gay activists and aging service professionals; it is now called Services & Advocacy for GLBT Elders. It works with LGBT older adults and aging service providers to address and overcome the challenges of discrimination in older adult service settings.

OWL - The Voice of Women 40+ was founded as the Older Women's League by Tish Sommers and Laurie Shields, following the White House Mini-Conference on Older Women in Des Moines, Iowa in October 1980. It advocated for women in the U.S. who were age 40 and over. In March 2017, it was reported that the national organization had decided to disband, but local chapters may continue to function under the OWL name or possibly another name.

Old Lesbians Organizing for Change was founded in 1987; the mission of the organization is to "eliminate the oppression of ageism and to stand in solidarity against all oppressions" through “[the] cooperative community of Old Lesbian feminist activists from many backgrounds working for justice and the well-being of all old lesbians.” Their initial meeting was inspired by the publication of the book Look Me in the Eye: Old Women, Aging and Ageism by Barbara Macdonald and Cynthia Rich in 1983.

Americans for a Society Free from Age Restrictions formed in 1996 to advance the civil and human rights of young people through eliminating ageist laws targeted against young people, and to help youth counter ageism in America.

The National Youth Rights Association started in 1998 to promote awareness of the legal and human rights of young people in the United States.

The Freechild Project was formed in 2001 to identify, unify and promote diverse opportunities for youth engagement in social change by fighting ageism. In 2002, the Freechild Project created an information and training initiative to provide resources to youth organizations and schools focused on youth rights.

== See also ==
- Ageism
- Age stratification
- Aging in the American workforce
- Elder law
- History of youth rights in the United States
- Mandatory retirement
- Nursing home residents' rights
- Youth rights
