= Babb v. Wilkie =

2020 United States Supreme Court case

- Supreme Court of the United States

Argued January 15, 2020 Decided April 6, 2020
- Full case name: Noris Babb, Petitioner v. Robert Wilkie, Secretary of Veterans Affairs
- Docket no.: 18-882
- Citations: 589 U.S. (more) 140 S. Ct. 1168
- Argument: Oral argument

Case history
- Prior: Babb v. McDonald, No. 8:14-cv-1732, 2016 WL 4441652 (M.D. Fla. Aug. 23, 2016); Affirmed in part, reversed in part sub nom. Babb v. Sec'y, Dep't of Veterans Affairs, 743 F. App'x 280 (11th Cir. 2018); Cert. granted sub nom. Babb v. Wilkie, 139 S. Ct. 2775 (2019).

Holding
- Section 633 of the Age Discrimination in Employment Act of 1967 permits federal employees to sue over any adverse personnel action that is influenced by age, even if age was not the determinating factor.

Court membership
- Chief Justice John Roberts Associate Justices Clarence Thomas · Ruth Bader Ginsburg; Stephen Breyer · Samuel Alito; Sonia Sotomayor · Elena Kagan; Neil Gorsuch · Brett Kavanaugh

Case opinions
- Majority: Alito, joined by Roberts, Breyer, Sotomayor, Kagan, Gorsuch, Kavanaugh; Ginsburg (all but footnote 3)
- Concurrence: Sotomayor, joined by Ginsburg
- Dissent: Thomas

Laws applied
- Age Discrimination in Employment Act of 1967

Babb v. Wilkie, 589 U.S. ___ (2020), is a case of the United States Supreme Court in which the justices considered the scope of protections for federal employees in the Age Discrimination in Employment Act of 1967. Specifically, the Court ruled that plaintiffs only need to prove that age was a motivating factor in the decision in order to sue. However, establishing but for causation is still necessary in determining the appropriate remedy. If a plaintiff can establish that the age was the determining factor in the employment outcome, they may be entitled to compensatory damages or other relief relating to the result of the employment decision.

This case is notable due to the significant impact the ruling can have on age discrimination complaints made by federal workers in the United States. Groups like the AARP and the NTEU filed friend-of-the-court briefs on behalf of the plaintiff. The case also received some coverage due to a reference to the popular meme OK boomer by Chief Justice John Roberts during the oral arguments. This case is also notable because it addressed a circuit split between different federal courts on this issue. Prior to the Supreme Court's ruling, federal courts have applied the 'but for' test to public-sector employees. Others, such as the Ninth Circuit, have held that a motivating factor test should be used during the summary judgment phase but not for a trial.

== Legal background ==
In 1968, Congress enacted the Age Discrimination in Employment Act of 1967 (ADEA), which prohibits employment discrimination against workers who are 40 years of age or older. It contains provisions covering both public- and private-sector workers. The private-sector provision forbids employers from discriminating against any individual because of age; the public-sector provision requires that employment decisions be made free from any discrimination based on age.

In 1973, the Supreme Court issued its opinion in McDonnell Douglas Corp. v. Green. This opinion was one of the first times the Supreme Court described in detail how the burden of proof works in discrimination cases. In the McDonnell Douglas case, the Court established that plaintiffs must first establish a prima facie case for discrimination. Next, the defendant (employer) has the opportunity to produce evidence of a legitimate, non-discriminatory reason for its actions. If the defendant/employer does so, the burden shifts back to the plaintiff who then must try to prove that the defendant's non-discriminatory reasons are pretextual or otherwise insufficient under the law. This framework, known as the McDonnell Douglas burden-shifting analysis, is now used by federal courts to interpret employment discrimination claims where no direct evidence of discriminatory intent can be found.

In 2009, the Supreme Court issued its opinion on Gross v. FBL Financial Services, Inc.. In a 5-4 opinion, the Court ruled that private-sector plaintiffs must prove that age was the "but for" cause of the adverse employment action they are suing over. That is, the plaintiff must prove that age discrimination was the determining reason for the adverse employment action (e.g. the action would not have been taken 'but for' the plaintiff's age). However, the Supreme Court's opinion did not explicitly mention public-sector workers. A later opinion, University of Texas Southwestern Medical Center v. Nassar (2013) applied the same 'but for' standard to retaliation claims.

== Case background ==
Noris Babb is a clinical pharmacist who started working for the United States Department of Veterans Affairs (VA) at the CW Young Medical Center in Bay Pines, Florida in 2004. In 2009, Babb obtained an advanced designation which allowed her to practice disease state management (DSM) - an advanced scope of practice which allowed her to prescribe medications for certain conditions without consulting a physician. In 2010, the VA created the Patient Aligned Care Team (PACT) system; among other effects, this initiative allowed pharmacists who practiced DSM (including Babb) to receive a promotion. Babb, along with other pharmacists at the center, sought promotions under the new system. However, some of the pharmacists came to believe that the new requirements were being implemented in a discriminatory way. In 2011, two other pharmacists filed a complaint with the Equal Employment Opportunity Commission (EEOC); Babb testified in support of these complaints. Additionally, Babb filed a complaint of her own in 2013 after management sought to remove Babb's advanced designations and denied her request for additional training or practice opportunities. In 2014, she filed a federal lawsuit against the VA, alleging that management at the medical center discriminated against her based on gender and age and also retaliated against her for protected EEOC-related activity.

== In lower courts ==
Babb's lawsuit against Robert Wilkie, the United States Secretary of Veterans Affairs, was filed in July 2014 in the United States District Court for the Middle District of Florida. The Secretary filed a motion for summary judgment, which the district court granted. The court found, under the McDonnell Douglas burden-shifting framework, that Babb had succeeded in establishing her prima facie case for discrimination; that the Secretary had offered legitimate, nondiscriminatory, and nonretaliatory reasons for the VA's actions; and that Babb could not prove that the reasons provided were pretextual. Accordingly, the court ruled in favor of the Secretary. The district court also dismissed Babb's hostile work environment claim, ruling the remarks that Babb noted in her complaint were not sufficiently severe and pervasive enough to constitute a hostile work environment.

Babb appealed the district court's decision to the United States Court of Appeals for the Eleventh Circuit. In July 2018, the 11th Circuit affirmed the district court's summary judgment on the ADEA, retaliation, and hostile work environment claims. Babb appealed again, this time to the Supreme Court. The Supreme Court granted her writ of certiorari and agreed to hear the case on June 28, 2019. They opted to limit their review to the issue of whether the federal-sector provision of the ADEA requires that the plaintiff prove that age was the 'but for' cause of the challenged action.

== At the Supreme Court ==
Oral arguments in this case took place on January 15, 2020. Babb was represented by Roman Martinez, an attorney with the law firm of Latham & Watkins. The VA was represented by Noel Francisco, the Solicitor General of the United States.

During the oral arguments, Babb's attorney Martinez emphasized the language of the ADEA and distinguished the wording used for public-sector employees from the wording used for private-sector employees. He noted that for public sector employees, the statute requires that employment decisions be made "free from" age-related bias, which he argued was broader in scope and meaning than the language used for private-sector employees under the ADEA. He argued that Congress's intent was to bar discrimination at any point in the employment process, even if the age-related discrimination was not the final determinative factor in the decision.

Arguing for the government, Francisco countered that the VA's interpretation of the statute would harmonize the rules for both public- and private-sector employees (imposing the 'but for' standard uniformly on all categories). In addition, he argued that other statutes such as the Civil Service Reform Act would offer the remedies that Babb was seeking under the ADEA. On January 17, 2020, the Supreme Court directed both parties to file supplemental briefs on what other judicial or administrative remedies would be available (other than the ADEA) to plaintiffs like Babb.
