= Age Discrimination in Employment Act of 1967 =

United States labor law

- Long title: An act to prohibit age discrimination in employment.
- Acronyms (colloquial): ADEA
- Enacted by: the 90th United States Congress
- Effective: June 12, 1968

Citations
- Public law: Pub. L. 90–202
- Statutes at Large: 81 Stat. 602

Codification
- U.S.C. sections created: 29 U.S.C. §§ 621–634

Legislative history
- Signed into law by President Lyndon B. Johnson on December 15, 1967

Major amendments
- Age Discrimination in Employment Act Amendments of 1978, Pub. L. 95–256; Age Discrimination in Employment Act Amendments of 1986, Pub. L. 99–592; Older Workers Benefit Protection Act, Pub. L. 101–433; Civil Rights Act of 1991, Pub. L. 102–166

United States Supreme Court cases
- United Air Lines, Inc. v. McMann, 434 U.S. 192 (1977); Lorillard v. Pons, 434 U.S. 575 (1978); Oscar Mayer & Co. v. Evans, 441 U.S. 750 (1979); Lehman v. Nakshian, 453 U.S. 156 (1981); EEOC v. Wyoming, 460 U.S. 226 (1983); Trans World Airlines, Inc. v. Thurston, 469 U.S. 111 (1985); Johnson v. Mayor and City Council of Baltimore, 472 U.S. 353 (1985); Western Air Lines, Inc. v. Criswell, 472 U.S. 400 (1985); Public Employees Retirement System of Ohio v. Betts, 492 U.S. 158 (1989); Hoffmann-La Roche Inc. v. Sperling, 493 U.S. 165 (1989); Stevens v. Department of Treasury, 500 U.S. 1 (1991); Gilmer v. Interstate/Johnson Lane Corp., 500 U.S. 20 (1991); Astoria Fed. Sav. & Loan Assn. v. Solimino, 501 U.S. 104 (1991); Gregory v. Ashcroft, 501 U.S. 452 (1991); Hazen Paper Co. v. Biggins, 507 U.S. 604 (1993); McKennon v. Nashville Banner Publishing Co., 513 U.S. 352 (1995); O'Connor v. Consolidated Coin Caterers Corp., 517 U.S. 308 (1996); Lockheed Corp. v. Spink, 517 U.S. 882 (1996); Oubre v. Entergy Operations, Inc., 522 U.S. 422 (1998); Kimel v. Florida Board of Regents, 528 U.S. 62 (2000); Reeves v. Sanderson Plumbing Products, Inc., 530 U.S. 133 (2000); Swierkiewicz v. Sorema N.A., 534 U.S. 506 (2002); General Dynamics Land Systems, Inc. v. Cline, 540 U.S. 581 (2004); Smith v. City of Jackson, 544 U.S. 228 (2005); Federal Exp. Corp. v. Holowecki, 552 U.S. 389 (2008); Gomez-Perez v. Potter, 553 U.S. 474 (2008); Meacham v. Knolls Atomic Power Laboratory, 554 U.S. 84 (2008); Kentucky Retirement Systems v. EEOC, 554 U.S. 135 (2008); 14 Penn Plaza LLC v. Pyett, 556 U.S. 247 (2009); Gross v. FBL Financial Services, Inc., 557 U.S. 167 (2009); Mount Lemmon Fire Dist. v. Guido, No. 17-587, 586 U.S. ___ (2018); Babb v. Wilkie, No. 18-882, 589 U.S. ___ (2020); Our Lady of Guadalupe School v. Morrissey-Berru, No. 19-267, 591 U.S. ___ (2020)

The Age Discrimination in Employment Act of 1967 (ADEA; 29 U.S.C. § 621 to 29 U.S.C. § 634) is a United States labor law that forbids employment discrimination against anyone, at least 40 years of age (see 29 U.S.C. § 631). The ADEA prevents age discrimination and provides equal employment opportunity under the conditions that were not explicitly covered in Title VII of the Civil Rights Act of 1964. The act also applies to the standards for pensions and benefits provided by employers, and requires that information concerning the needs of older workers be provided to the general public.

== History ==
In 1967, the ADEA was signed into law by President Lyndon B. Johnson.

== Scope of protection ==
The ADEA includes a broad ban of age discrimination against workers, at least the age of forty, and also specifically, the act prohibits:

- discrimination in hiring, promotions, wages, and termination of employment and layoffs;
- statements of specifications in age preference or limitations;
- denial of benefits to older employees: an employer may reduce benefits based on age, only if the cost of providing the reduced benefits to older workers is the same as the cost of providing full benefits to younger workers; and
- since 1986, it has prohibited mandatory retirement in most sectors, with phased elimination of mandatory retirement for tenured workers, such as college professors, in 1993.

Mandatory retirement based on age is permitted for:

- executives over 65 years in high policy-making positions, who are entitled to a pension over a minimum yearly duration.

== Covered employers ==
The Act applies to employers, who employ at least twenty employees on a regular basis within the current or prior calendar year.

== Amendments ==
The ADEA was amended in 1986, and also in 1991, by the Older Workers Benefit Protection Act (Pub. L. 101-433) and the Civil Rights Act of 1991 (Pub. L. 102-166).

== Case law ==
The ADEA differs from the Civil Rights Act in that, the ADEA applies to employers of 20 or more employees (see 29 U.S.C. § 630) rather than 15 or more employees. Both acts however, only apply to employers in the industries affecting interstate commerce. The 20 employees can include overseas employees.

It protects U.S. citizens working for U.S. employers operating abroad, except where it would violate the laws of that country.

An age limit may be legally specified in the circumstance, where age has been shown to be a "bona fide occupational qualification [BFOQ], reasonably necessary to the normal operation of the particular business" (see 29 U.S.C. § 623(f)(1)). In practice, BFOQs for age are limited to the obvious (hiring a young actor to play a young character in a movie) or when public safety is at stake (for example, in the case of age limits for pilots and bus drivers).

The ADEA does not prohibit an employer from favoring an older employee over a younger one, even when the younger one is over 40 years old. However, such practice may be illegal in states like New Jersey, New York, and District of Columbia where workers ages 18 and older are protected from age discrimination, therefore, employers cannot give preference to either younger or older workers.

The United States Supreme Court, in Meacham v. Knolls Atomic Power Laboratory, 554 U.S. 84 (2008), held that the employer, not the employee, bears the burden of proving that a layoff or other action that hurts older workers more than others was based not on age but on some other “reasonable factor.”

In Gomez-Perez v. Potter (2008), the Supreme Court allowed federal workers, who experience retaliation as a result of reporting age discrimination under the law, to sue for damages.

In Kimel v. Florida Bd. of Regents, 528 U.S. 62 (2000), the Supreme Court held that state employees cannot sue states for monetary damages under the ADEA in federal court. The EEOC may still enforce the ADEA against states, and state employees may still sue state officials for declaratory and injunctive relief.

In Gross v. FBL Financial Services, Inc., 557 U.S. 167 (2009), the Supreme Court ruled that a plaintiff must prove by a preponderance of the evidence that age was the "but for" cause of the challenged employment action.

Babb v. Wilkie is a Supreme Court case, which considered the scope and breadth of the ADEA. In it, the court ruled that plaintiffs only need to prove that age was a motivating factor in the decision in order to sue. However, establishing but for causation is still necessary in determining the appropriate remedy. The ruling of Babb v. Wilkie only applies to federal sector employees. If a plaintiff can establish that the age was the determining factor in the employment outcome, they may be entitled to compensatory damages or other relief relating to the result of the employment decision.

== Remedies ==
ADEA remedies include compensatory for employee or damages if reinstatement is not feasible and/or employer's violation is intentional. While punitive damages under the ADEA are not available, if the violation was intentional, plaintiffs are entitled to liquidated/statutory damages i.e. twice the back pay/front pay award.

== Defenses ==
Statutory defenses to ADEA claims include/that

- employers may enforce waivers of age discrimination claims made without EEOC or court approval if the waiver is "knowing or voluntary";
- valid arbitration agreements between employers and employees covering the dispute are subject to compulsory arbitration and no court action can be brought;
- employers can discharge or discipline an employee for "good cause," regardless of the employee's age;
- employers can take an action based on "reasonable factors other than age";
- bona fide occupational qualifications, seniority systems, employee benefit or early retirement plans; and
- voluntary early retirement incentives.

== See also ==
- Age discrimination in the United States
- Ageism
- United States labor law
