= Knolls Atomic Power Laboratory =

Research and development facility for the US Navy in Niskayuna, New York

Coordinates: 43.04056°N 73.95380°W

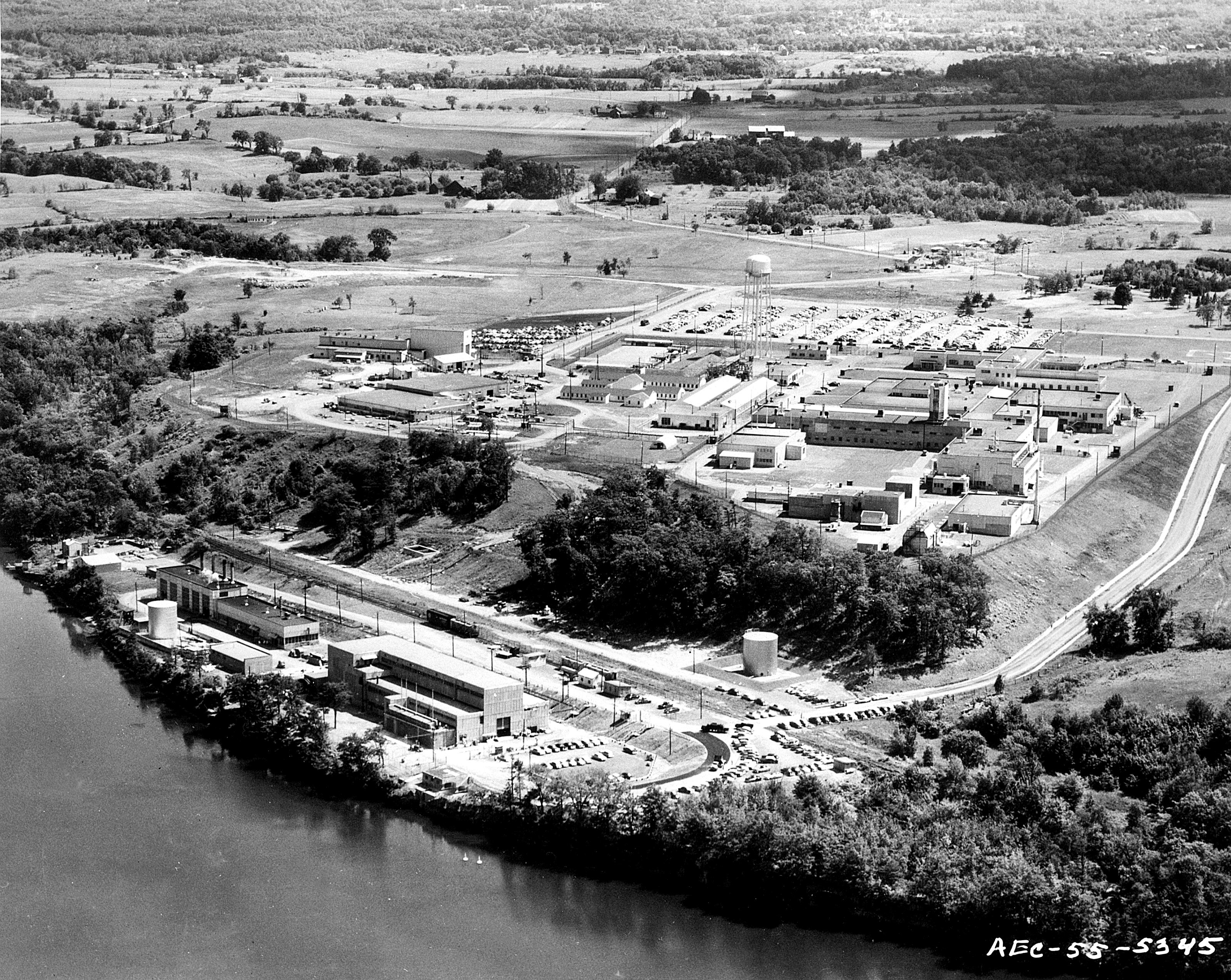
Overhead view of the KAPL, c. 1955

Knolls Atomic Power Laboratory (KAPL) is an American research and development facility based in Niskayuna, New York and dedicated to the support of the U.S. Naval Nuclear Propulsion Program. KAPL was instituted in 1946 under a contract between General Electric and the United States government. In the 21st century, KAPL is a government-owned, contractor-operated laboratory for the U.S. Department of Energy. KAPL is responsible for the research, design, construction, operation, and maintenance of U.S. nuclear-powered warships. It also manages work on nuclear ships at numerous shipyards across the country.

== History ==
On May 15, 1946, KAPL began with a contract between General Electric and the U.S. Government to conduct nuclear research and development, including the generation of electricity from nuclear energy. In 1950, the nuclear power plant project was converted to a Naval Nuclear Propulsion project. Several years later Knolls' work joined that of Bettis Atomic Power Laboratory, the Argonne National Laboratory, and others in developing the world's first nuclear-powered submarine, the USS Nautilus on January 21, 1954.

In 1952 and 1953, Jimmy Carter, who would later become a U.S. president, worked at KAPL as an engineer.

The Chart of the Nuclides, containing information such as masses, relative abundances, half-lives, neutron cross sections, and decay properties for more than 3,100 nuclides and 580 isomers was developed at KAPL. This chart is a necessity for students and professionals in nuclear physics, chemistry, engineering, and medicine around the world. The Chart has been compiled, edited and periodically revised by KAPL scientists since 1956.

== Today ==
KAPL operates two sites in New York: the Knolls site in Niskayuna and the Kenneth A. Kesselring site in West Milton. Niskayuna is the primary site for the KAPL, focusing on the design and development of naval propulsion plants and reactor cores. The West Milton site operates land-based prototypes of shipboard reactor plants. This site is also used to train officers and enlisted personnel for the U.S. Navy's fleet of nuclear-powered vessels. KAPL employs more than 2,600 people at these sites and others, mostly shipyards in the states of California, Connecticut, Hawaii, Maine, Virginia, and Washington.

In 2006 KAPL achieved full remediation of the S1C Prototype Reactor site located in Windsor, Connecticut. The S1C site remedial action was declared to be complete by the Connecticut Department of Environmental Protection in October 2006. KAPL had taken over operation of the S1C Prototype in the 1960s after expiration of the Navy's original contract with Combustion Engineering.

KAPL, as well as Bettis Atomic Power Laboratory, is managed and operated by Fluor Marine Propulsion Corporation, a subsidiary of Fluor Corporation. Previously operated by Bechtel Marine Propulsion Corporation, a wholly owned subsidiary of Bechtel National Incorporated. The previous operating contractor of KAPL was Lockheed Martin. KAPL's original contractor was General Electric. KAPL was one of the first laboratories to conduct research on obtaining usable power from nuclear reactors.

== Employee case ==
KAPL was sued in a precedent-setting age discrimination lawsuit. In June 2008, a 7-1 decision of the United States Supreme Court placed the burden on all employers to prove that a layoff affecting older workers is based on reasonable factors other than age, reversing a lower court that placed the burden of proving age discrimination on the dismissed employees.

The long-running case, Meacham v. Knolls Atomic Power Lab (Docket 06-1505), was filed by 28 of 31 employees dismissed during downsizing at the lab in 1996. The Lab had instituted a voluntary buyout plan but could not attain the desired staff reduction. It developed a matrix to rank employees based on three factors: performance, flexibility and criticality of their jobs, and added points for years of service. All of the dismissed employees were at least 40 years old.

Twenty-eight of those dismissed sued in January 1997 under the Age Discrimination in Employment Act. A jury found for the employees in December 2000, and judgment was rendered in 2002. The Lab appealed to the U.S. Court of Appeals for the 2nd Circuit, but the judgment was upheld in 2004. KAPL appealed again and, while its petition to the US Supreme Court was pending, a related case (Smith v. City of Jackson [Docket 03-1160]) caused the Court in 2006 to vacate the judgment in favor of the defendants (Meacham II).

The 17 remaining plaintiffs (9 had settled their claims) petitioned the US Supreme Court, which ultimately ruled in their favor on technical grounds. The case was remanded to the 2nd Circuit Court, where the original judgment was finally reinstated in 2009 (Meacham III).

The importance of this case stems from its conclusion that employers' actions or policies that appear reasonable and neutral but nevertheless have a disparate impact on older workers are discriminatory in practice. In the majority opinion, Justice Souter wrote, “There is no denying that putting employers to the work of persuading fact-finders that their choices are reasonable makes it harder and costlier to defend,” but that was an issue that Congress should address.

== See also ==
- Bettis Atomic Power Laboratory
- Bell Labs
- DuPont
- General Electric Research Laboratory
- Massachusetts Institute of Technology
- Westinghouse Electric

== General References ==
- Knolls Action Project Records 1969-1994 (APAP-105). M. E. Grenander Department of Special Collections and Archives, University Libraries, University at Albany, State University of New York (hereafter referred to as the Knolls Action Project Records).
