= Mixed motive =

Mixed motive may refer to:

- Mixed motives (math), Voevodsky's construction of the derived category of algebraic geometric mixed motives
- "Mixed motive" discrimination, in constitutional law
