= Look Me in the Eye (disambiguation) =

Look Me in the Eye is a 2007 book by John Elder Robison

Look Me in the Eye also refers to:

- Look Me in the Eye, a 1996 episode of Screen Two, written and directed by Nick Ward
- Look Me In The Eye (TV series), an Australian reality series
- Look Me in the Eye: Women, Aging and Ageism, a 1983 book by Barbara Macdonald

== See also ==
- Look into My Eyes (disambiguation)
- "When You Look Me in the Eyes", a 2007 song by the Jonas Brothers
- When I Look in Your Eyes, a 1999 album by Diana Krall
- "When I Look into Your Eyes", a 1992 song by FireHouse
- Eye contact
