= Wilson v. Southwest Airlines Co. =

Wilson v Southwest Airlines
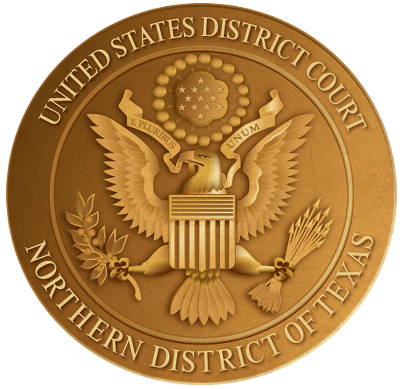
- Court: United States District Court for the Northern District of Texas
- Full case name: Gregory Wilson et al. v Southwest Airlines Co.
- Decided: 1981
- Citation: 517 F.Supp. 292 (N.D. Tex. 1981)

Holding
- A tangential requirement for a position is not a bona fide occupational qualification as a defense for discrimination on the basis of sex.

Keywords
- Employment discrimination; bona fide occupational qualification (BFOQ)

Wilson v. Southwest Airlines Co., 517 F. Supp. 292 (N.D. Tex. 1981), is a US employment discrimination law case concerning bona fide occupational qualifications. Title VII of the Civil Rights Act of 1964 is a federal law that prohibits employment discrimination based on race, color, religion, sex, or national origin. The law contains an exception for bona fide occupational qualifications, allowing businesses to hire on the basis of religion, sex, or national origin in instances where it is a qualification reasonably necessary for their operations. Bona fide occupational qualifications are qualities or attributes that employers are allowed to consider when hiring employees, which would otherwise be considered illegal discrimination in other circumstances.

== Facts ==
During the 1970s, Southwest Airlines embraced a marketing strategy emphasizing “feminine spirit, fun, and sex appeal.” The airline, branding itself as the "love airline," outfitted its flight attendants in hot pants and go-go boots and provided passengers with complimentary drinks referred to as "love potions." As a part of maintaining this image, Southwest exclusively hired women for flight attendant and ticketing agent positions. At the time of the case's decision, Southwest was the only major airline in the United States that refused to employ men as flight attendants and ticketing agents.

Plaintiff Gregory Wilson, along with a class of over 100 male job applicants, challenged Southwest Airlines' refusal to hire men, arguing that it violated Title VII of the Civil Rights Act of 1964. They also claimed that Southwest's height and weight requirements for flight attendants disproportionately excluded male applicants compared to female applicants. In response, Southwest contended that its female employees were integral to the company's success and that their employment fell under the bona fide occupational qualification exception in Section 703(e)(1) of the Civil Rights Act of 1964.

== Judgment ==
The Court rejected Southwest's bona fide occupational qualification defense, finding that even though Southwest's marketing relied on sexual titillation, their decision to hire only women in certain roles was not permissible. The Court held that being a woman was not a necessary qualification to perform the duties required of flight attendants and ticketing agents and that Southwest's desire to continue their successful marketing campaign was not a business necessity that trumped federal law. The Court reasoned that recognizing a sex based bona fide occupational qualification would lead to other employers discriminating against potential employees by using sex or sex appeal as a qualification for any job that required public facing contact where customers preferred employees of a single sex. The Court held that to rule otherwise would undermine Congress’ stated purpose of preventing employers from “refusing to hire an individual based on stereotyped characterization of the sexes.”

== Significance ==
Although the analysis in Wilson treats the bona fide occupational qualification exception and the business necessity defense as one thing, the Supreme Court treated them as separate and distinct tests in United Automobile Workers v. Johnson Controls, Inc. The Equal Employment Opportunity Commission (EEOC) has stated that bona fide occupational qualifications are not warranted in situations such as: refusal to hire a woman because of her sex based on assumptions about employment characteristics of women in general; refusal to hire an individual based on stereotyped characterizations of the sexes; and the preferences of co-workers, employers, clients or customers. Some states have adopted similar laws that allow exceptions for bona fide occupational qualifications.

== See also ==
- US labor law
