= Meacham v. Knolls Atomic Power Laboratory =

- Supreme Court of the United States

Argued April 23, 2008 Decided June 19, 2008
- Full case name: Clifford B. Meacham, et al. v. Knolls Atomic Power Laboratory, aka KAPL, Inc., et al.
- Docket no.: 06-1505
- Citations: 554 U.S. 84 (more)
- Argument: Oral argument
- Opinion announcement: Opinion announcement

Holding
- An employer bears both the burden of production and burden of persuasion when defending a disparate impact claim using the "reasonable factors" defense under the Age Discrimination in Employment Act of 1967.

Court membership
- Chief Justice John Roberts Associate Justices John P. Stevens · Antonin Scalia; Anthony Kennedy · David Souter; Clarence Thomas · Ruth Bader Ginsburg; Stephen Breyer · Samuel Alito

Case opinions
- Majority: Souter, joined by Roberts, Stevens, Kennedy, Ginsburg, and Alito; Thomas (Parts I and II-A)
- Concurrence: Scalia (in judgement)
- Concur/dissent: Thomas
- Breyer took no part in the consideration or decision of the case.

Laws applied
- Age Discrimination in Employment Act of 1967

Meacham v. Knolls Atomic Power Laboratory, 554 U.S. 84 (2008), was a case decided by the Supreme Court of the United States on June 19, 2008. The Court decided that an employer bears both the burden of production and burden of persuasion when defending a disparate impact claim using the "reasonable factors" defense under the Age Discrimination in Employment Act of 1967 (ADEA).

== Background ==
When Knolls Atomic Power Laboratory (KAPL) conducted a reduction in force in 1996, the employees were assessed based on factors of performance, flexibility, criticality of skills, and years of service. 31 employees were eventually laid off and 30 of them were at least 40 years of age. 26 of these employees filed suit against KAPL asserting, inter alia, disparate impact based on age under the ADEA. At trial, a jury found for the employees on the disparate impact claim and the United States Court of Appeals for the Second Circuit initially affirmed. On appeal, the U.S. Supreme Court vacated the judgment and remanded the case due to its 2005 Smith v. City of Jackson decision. The Second Circuit then vacated its previous decision and held that the petitioners failed to carry their burden of persuasion to prove that KAPL's method of evaluating employees was unreasonable. The employees then appealed to the U.S. Supreme Court.

== Result ==
In a 7–1 decision vacating the Second Circuit's judgment, the Court held that when defending a disparate impact claim using the "reasonable factors other than age" defense under the ADEA, the employer is the one that bears both the burden of production and burden of persuasion.

== See also ==
- Age Discrimination in Employment Act of 1967
- Ageism
- List of United States Supreme Court cases, volume 554
- United States labor law
