= University of Texas Southwestern Medical Center v. Nassar =

- Supreme Court of the United States

Argued April 24, 2013 Decided June 24, 2013
- Full case name: University of Texas Southwestern Medical Center v. Nassar
- Docket no.: 12-484
- Citations: 570 U.S. 338 (more) 133 S. Ct. 2517; 186 L. Ed. 2d 503

Case history
- Prior: 674 F.3d 448 (5th Cir. 2012); rehearing en banc denied, 688 F.3d 211 (5th Cir. 2012); cert. granted, 568 U.S. 1140 (2013).

Holding
- A plaintiff establishes a violation of the retaliation provision of Title VII if the plaintiff proves that the defendant would not have made the adverse employment action but for the defendant's retaliatory motive.

Court membership
- Chief Justice John Roberts Associate Justices Antonin Scalia · Anthony Kennedy; Clarence Thomas · Ruth Bader Ginsburg; Stephen Breyer · Samuel Alito; Sonia Sotomayor · Elena Kagan

Case opinions
- Majority: Kennedy, joined by Roberts, Scalia, Thomas, Alito
- Dissent: Ginsburg, joined by Breyer, Sotomayor, Kagan

Laws applied
- Title VII of the Civil Rights Act of 1964

University of Texas Southwestern Medical Center v. Nassar, 570 U.S. 338 (2013), was a Supreme Court of the United States case involving the standard of proof required for a retaliation claim under Title VII of the Civil Rights Act of 1964. The Court held that while Title VII applies a mixed motive discrimination framework to claims of discrimination on the basis of race, color, religion, sex, or national origin (see 42 U.S.C. § 2000e-2), that framework did not apply to claims of retaliation under 42 U.S.C. § 2000e-3. The Court reasoned that based on its decision in Gross v. FBL Financial Services, Inc. and on common law principles of tort law, the plaintiff was required to show that a retaliatory motive was the "but for" cause of the adverse employment action.

== Background ==
From 1995 to 1998 and 2001 to 2006, Dr. Nassar, an Egyptian-born Muslim, was a faculty member of the University of Texas Southwestern Medical Center, as well as a medical doctor at Parkland Memorial Hospital. Dr. Nassar contended that Dr. Beth Levine, one of his supervisors, had created a hostile work environment towards Dr. Nassar on account of his race. Dr. Nassar resigned from the university in 2006, citing Dr. Levine's discriminatory behavior in his resignation letter. Prior to his resignation, Dr. Nassar had requested and received an offer to continue working at Parkland Hospital, but after receiving his resignation letter, the university instructed the hospital to withdraw the offer.

== Opinion of the Court ==
The Court determined that Title VII's mixed motive discrimination did not apply to retaliation claims, and therefore Gross v. FBL Financial Services, Inc. was instructive. The Court opined that the placement of the mixed-motive test in the status-based discrimination section and not the retaliation section indicated Congress' intent to exclude retaliation claims from that standard. The Court then turned to the text of the retaliation provision and found it similar to the ADEA provision addressed in Gross v. FBL Financial Services, Inc.

== See also ==
- List of United States Supreme Court cases, volume 570
