= Geary v. Visitation of Blessed Virgin Mary School =

- Court: United States Court of Appeals for the Third Circuit
- Full case name: Marie Geary v. Visitation of Blessed Virgin Mary School; Francis J. Clemins, Reverend Monsignor, Individually and as Pastor of Visitation of Blessed Virgin Mary Church; Archdiocese of Philadelphia
- Decided: October 6, 1993
- Citations: 7 F.3d 324; 62 Fair Empl.Prac.Cas. (BNA) 1679; 62 Empl. Prac. Dec. (CCH) ¶ 42,582; 62 USLW 2222; 86 Ed. Law Rep. 623

Court membership
- Judges sitting: Carol Los Mansmann, Morton I. Greenberg, Timothy K. Lewis

Case opinions
- Majority: Mansmann, joined by a unanimous court

Laws applied
- Age Discrimination in Employment Act of 1967

Geary v. Visitation of Blessed Virgin Mary School, 7 F.3d 324 (3d Cir. 1993), was a court case in the United States Court of Appeals for the Third Circuit which considered whether a religious school in Darby, Pennsylvania could be sued for age discrimination.

== Facts ==
Appellant was employed as a lay instructor by the Blessed Virgin Mary Catholic Church. She was discharged from her employment at the age of 50, after 29 years of employment. She had a steady record of favorable performance reviews. Had her employment continued, she would have been the highest-paid lay instructor on the school's staff. Instead, she was replaced by a younger, lower-paid instructor.

The school claimed that she was discharged because she married a man who had been divorced in the past, a violation of church doctrine on the subject. Geary claimed that her discharge was because of her age.

== Procedural history ==
The appellee filed a complaint with the Equal Employment Opportunity Commission (EEOC), claiming that the school had violated the terms of the Age Discrimination in Employment Act (ADEA). When the EEOC complaint was filed, the school took steps to cancel the appellee's health insurance, stating that the cancellation was necessary because of the legal action.

The EEOC ultimately ruled that the discharge itself did not constitute a violation of the ADEA, but the subsequent cancellation of the insurance was retaliatory in nature and was a violation of the Act. 29 U.S.C. § 623(a), (d).

A suit was brought in the United States District Court for the Eastern District of Pennsylvania, alleging violations of the ADEA. The District Court held that: (1) The ADEA does not apply to religious schools and, (2) The appellee's state claims for intentional infliction of emotional distress and wrongful discharge were without merit. The District Court granted summary judgment in favor of the school.

The decision of the District Court was appealed, resulting in this decision.

== Question presented ==
Does the ADEA protect a lay instructor employed in a church-operated elementary school?

== Answer ==
ADEA can only apply to an employment action that was taken based on a claim of religious doctrine or tenet if the plaintiff does not challenge the validity of the doctrine or tenet and only asks whether the doctrine or tenet actually motivated the challenged employment action.

== Key points of analysis ==
The court recognized the possibility of church-state "entanglement", but relied on the holding in DeMarco v. Holy Cross High School, in distinguishing between "ongoing supervision" and "limited inquiry" with respect to government oversight of religious schools. The court found that there was no direct conflict in the case at hand between the secular prohibitions contained in the ADEA and the religious doctrine that was claimed to be the motivating factor behind the discharge.

The claim that the cancellation of the appellee's insurance was based on the ongoing legal dispute was allowed to proceed because continued prosecution of that claim would not lead to any inquiry regarding church doctrine.

== Holding ==
No issue of material fact was raised to suggest any motivation other than the claimed doctrinal reason for the discharge. The summary judgment of the district court was affirmed.

The court did, however, find that an issue of material fact existed as to whether or not the cancellation of insurance was retaliatory in nature. The summary judgment of the district court was vacated and the case remanded for further fact-finding on this specific issue.

== Other information ==
Although the central holding of this case is still valid, other courts have either declined to follow or declined to extend the ruling to employees of church-based organizations whose positions are "ministerial" or "ecclesiastical" in function. The determination of whether or not a position is ministerial in nature seems to be almost mathematical in its application, looking almost exclusively at the amount of time that an employee spends on religion-oriented tasks as compared to non-religion tasks.
