= Bona fide occupational qualification =

Employment law concept

In employment law, a bona fide occupational qualification (BFOQ) (US), bona fide occupational requirement (BFOR) (Canada), or genuine occupational qualification (GOQ) (UK) is a quality or an attribute that employers are allowed to consider when making decisions on the hiring and retention of employees—a quality that when considered in other contexts would constitute discrimination in violation of civil rights employment law. A BFOQ can legally justify discrimination if it is directly related to the realization of the business's function, supported by reliable evidence, validated through widely accepted research consensus, and if proving that a prospective hire is an exception to the recognized consensus would cause undue hardship for the employer. Such qualifications must be listed in the employment advertisement.

== Canada ==
The law of Canada regarding bona fide occupational requirements was considered in a 1985 Canadian court case involving an employee of the Canadian National Railway, K. S. Bhinder, a Sikh whose religion required that he wear a turban, lost his challenge of the CNR policy that required him to wear a hard hat. In 1990, in deciding another case, the Supreme Court of Canada amended the Bhinder decision: "An employer that has not adopted a policy with respect to accommodation and cannot otherwise satisfy the trier of fact that individual accommodation would result in undue hardship will be required to justify his conduct with respect to the individual complainant. Even then the employer can invoke the BFOQ defence."

== United States ==
In employment discrimination law in the United States, both Title VII of the Civil Rights Act of 1964 and the Age Discrimination in Employment Act contain a BFOQ defense. The BFOQ provision of Title VII provides that:

[I]t shall not be an unlawful employment practice for an employer to hire and employ employees, for an employment agency to classify, or refer for employment any individual, for a labor organization to classify its membership or to classify or refer for employment any individual, or for an employer, labor organization, or joint labor-management committee controlling apprenticeship or other training or retraining programs to admit or employ any individual in any such program, on the basis of his religion, sex, or national origin in those certain instances where religion, sex, or national origin is a bona fide occupational qualification reasonably necessary to the normal operation of that particular business or enterprise ...

United States Code Title 29 (Labor), Chapter 14 (age discrimination in employment), section 623 (prohibition of age discrimination) establishes that

It shall not be unlawful for an employer, employment agency, or labor organization (1) to take any action otherwise prohibited under subsections (a), (b), (c), or (e) of this section where age is a bona fide occupational qualification reasonably necessary to the normal operation of the particular business, or where the differentiation is based on reasonable factors other than age, or where such practices involve an employee in a workplace in a foreign country, and compliance with such subsections would cause such employer, or a corporation controlled by such employer, to violate the laws of the country in which such workplace is located.

One example of bona fide occupational qualifications are mandatory retirement ages for bus drivers and airline pilots, for safety reasons. Further, in advertising, a manufacturer of men's clothing may lawfully advertise for male models. Religious belief may also be considered a BFOQ; for example, a religious school may lawfully require that members of its faculty be members of that denomination, and may lawfully bar from employment anyone who is not a member. Fire departments can require firefighters to be able to lift a given weight to demonstrate that they will be able to carry fire victims out of a burning building. Most militaries around the world have a weight and personal fitness standard to help make sure troops are able to carry physically demanding missions.

While religion, sex, or national origin may be considered a bona fide occupational qualification in narrow contexts, race can never be a BFOQ. However, the First Amendment will override Title VII in artistic works where the race of the employee is integral to the story or artistic purpose. A good example would be if there was a biographical film of Martin Luther King Jr., it would be integral that the lead actor must be an African American male. (This consideration is not limited to race.)

Bona fide occupational qualifications generally only apply to instances in which the BFOQ is considered reasonably necessary to the normal operation of a particular business. For example, a Catholic college may lawfully require such positions as president, chaplain, and teaching faculty to be Catholics, but membership in the Catholic Church would generally not be considered a BFOQ for occupations such as secretarial and janitorial positions.

Mere customer satisfaction, or lack thereof, is not enough to justify a BFOQ defense, as noted in the cases Diaz v. Pan Am. World Airways, Inc. and Wilson v. Southwest Airlines Co. Therefore, customer preference for females does not make femininity a BFOQ for the occupation of flight attendant. However, there may be cases in which customer preference is a BFOQ – for example, femininity is reasonably necessary for Playboy Bunnies. Several breastaurants like Hooters have also used such requirements of femininity and female sex appeal under a BFOQ defense. Customer preference can "'be taken into account only when it is based on the company's inability to perform the primary function or service it offers,' that is, where sex or sex appeal is itself the dominant service provided."

While certain other laws don't contain a BFOQ defense, the general import of such a defense is often recognized. For example, the Americans with Disabilities Act (ADA) does not contain a BFOQ defense; nonetheless, according to the United States Equal Employment Opportunity Commission, "an employer may defend the use of a qualification standard that screens out an individual on the basis of disability by showing that the standard is job related and consistent with business necessity."

== United Kingdom ==
In UK employment discrimination law, a GOQ exists when the nature of a particular job causes the sex or gender of an applicant to become a reasonable cause for choosing one applicant over another. GOQs are a special case exception to the Employment (Sex Discrimination) Act 2000, defined in Section 9 of this act.

There are eight possible types of reason for claiming a GOQ in advertising a particular job:

- Jobs in foreign countries with specifically relevant laws or customs
- Physiology or authenticity (for example, in choosing actors to play a role),
- Privacy and decency of people the employee would be dealing with (for example, staff in a care home),
- Private household's integrity (for example, professional carers for an individual, but not normally nannies),
- Single-sex accommodation, when it is unreasonable to expect the employer to provide additional accommodation,
- Single-sex establishments, for example special prisons and refuges,
- Personal welfare and counselling, when sex is directly relevant to the welfare or counselling provided,
- When a pair of jobs are advertised specifically for a married couple.

In each of these, reasons must be specific and absolute, not based on stereotypes or generalised assumptions.

== See also ==
- Color-blind casting
- Hooters § Legal history
- Make one's bones
- Personnel selection
