= DeMarco v. Holy Cross High School =

American legal case

- Court: United States Court of Appeals for the Second Circuit
- Full case name: Guy DeMarco v. Holy Cross High School
- Decided: September 1, 1993
- Citation: 4 F.3d 166 (2nd Cir. 1993)

Court membership
- Judges sitting: John M. Walker, Jr., Joseph M. McLaughlin, and Thomas P. Griesa

Case opinions
- Unanimous: Walker

DeMarco v. Holy Cross High School 4 F.3d 166 (2nd Cir. 1993) was a discrimination case brought under the Age Discrimination in Employment Act of 1967 ("ADEA"). The appellant, Guy DeMarco, was released from employment before his eligibility for tenure at the age of forty-nine. Holy Cross High School argued that it was not subject to ADEA laws and that if it were, this case against it violated the Free Exercise Clause and the Establishment Clause of the First Amendment. The school also argued that DeMarco had failed to utilize the administrative remedies available.

== Facts ==
Guy DeMarco was employed by Holy Cross High School (Queens) as a math instructor starting in 1985. Although he was a lay instructor, he also led the class in morning prayer and took the students to mass. Under the terms of his contract of employment, his employment was to last five years with the option to extend that employment in five-year increments at the discretion of the employer. Upon completing his first five-year term of service, DeMarco was advised that a contract renewal would not be offered to him, and he left the employment of the school. He then sued under the Age Discrimination in Employment Act alleging his age played a role in the school's decision, which the school denied.

== Procedural history ==
A complaint was filed with the Equal Employment Opportunity Commission. The complaint alleged violation of the Age Discrimination in Employment Act. The EEOC subsequently determined that no violation of the ADEA had occurred.

A lawsuit was filed in the United States District Court for the Eastern District of New York, alleging age discrimination. The school filed a motion for summary judgment, claiming that the non-renewal of DeMarco's contract was due to performance issues. Specifically, the school claimed that he did not begin his classes with prayer or attend mass with his students. The appellant argued that summary judgment would be appropriate, because enforcement of labor statutes against religious organizations was unconstitutional under the Establishment Clause of the First Amendment. The district court granted summary judgment.

The decision of the district court was appealed, resulting in this decision.

== Key points of analysis ==
The trial disputed whether the ADEA applies to religious schools. The answer came back as conditional: ADEA can only apply to an employment action that was taken based on a claim of religious doctrine or tenet if the plaintiff does not challenge the validity of the doctrine or tenet and only asks whether the doctrine or tenet actually motivated the challenged employment action.

If an employee establishes a prima facie case for discrimination, then the burden of proof shifts to the employer to establish a non-discriminatory purpose for the challenged employment action.

Courts have long recognized a distinction between ongoing governmental supervision of all aspects of employment, such as would be required under labor statutes like the National Labor Relations Act, and the more limited inquiry required by anti-discrimination statutes. The inquiry must be narrowly focused on whether the stated purpose for the challenged employment action is the actual purpose for that action.

The ministerial exception applies primarily to members of the clergy. The court finds that there is a pervasive religious relationship between members of the clergy and their employers (the church). In this case, the religious duties that were alleged to have been violated were easily isolated and defined. As a result of this, the district could separate such duties from the age discrimination allegation for fact-finding purposes.

== Holding ==
The court noted that other anti-discrimination statutes were held to be applicable to religious organizations, except for statutes that prohibited discrimination based on religious belief. Since statutes prohibiting discrimination by race, gender and national origin were already found applicable to religious organizations, it was logical (and a reasonable interpretation of the legislative history) to extend the prohibition against age discrimination to religious organizations as well.

The decision of the district court was reversed, and the case was remanded for further proceedings.

== Other information ==
Although the central holding of this case is still valid, other courts have either declined to follow or declined to extend the ruling to employees of church-based organizations whose positions are "ministerial" or "ecclesiastical" in nature. The determination of whether a position is ministerial in nature looks almost exclusively at the amount of time that an employee spends on religion-oriented tasks.

== See also ==
- Geary v. Visitation of Blessed Virgin Mary School: another case involving ageism claims against a Catholic school
