= Kentucky Retirement Systems v. EEOC =

- Supreme Court of the United States

Argued January 9, 2008 Decided June 19, 2008
- Full case name: Kentucky Retirement Systems, Commonwealth of Kentucky, and Jefferson County Sheriff's Department. v. Equal Employment Opportunity Commission
- Docket no.: 06-1037
- Citations: 554 U.S. 135 (more)
- Argument: Oral argument
- Opinion announcement: Opinion announcement

Holding
- A retirement system that uses age as an explicit factor in determining benefits is not engaged in prohibited age discrimination when the factor is meant to distinguish pension status and was not actually motivated by bias against older workers.

Court membership
- Chief Justice John Roberts Associate Justices John P. Stevens · Antonin Scalia; Anthony Kennedy · David Souter; Clarence Thomas · Ruth Bader Ginsburg; Stephen Breyer · Samuel Alito

Case opinions
- Majority: Breyer, joined by Roberts, Stevens Souter and Thomas
- Dissent: Kennedy, joined by Scalia, Ginsburg and Alito

Laws applied
- Age Discrimination in Employment Act of 1967

Kentucky Retirement Systems v. EEOC, 554 U.S. 135 (2008) is a United States Supreme Court case in which the court held that Kentucky's retirement system does not amount to age discrimination under the Age Discrimination in Employment Act when granting pensions to disabled persons who had not yet reached the permitted retirement age of 55.

Associate Justice Stephen Breyer explained in the majority opinion that "where an employer treats employees differently based on their pension status and even if the pension status does depend on age, the plaintiff still has to show that that age made a difference rather than just a pension status, that it was actually motivated this discrimination or there's a reason for it that was based upon age and not pension status."
