= Gomez-Perez v. Potter =

- Supreme Court of the United States

Argued February 19, 2008 Decided May 27, 2008
- Full case name: Myrna Gomez-Perez, Petitioner v. John E. Potter, Postmaster General
- Docket no.: 06-1321
- Citations: 553 U.S. 474 (more) 128 S. Ct. 1931; 170 L. Ed. 2d 887
- Argument: Oral argument

Case history
- Prior: No. 3:03-cv-02236, 2006 WL 488060 (D.P.R. Feb. 28, 2006); affirmed, 476 F.3d 54 (1st Cir. 2007); cert. granted, 551 U.S. 1188 (2007).
- Subsequent: Vacated and remanded, 533 F.3d 19 (1st Cir. 2008).

Holding
- Federal employees who face retaliation after filing an age discrimination claim are authorized to sue under the federal-sector provision of the Age Discrimination in Employment Act of 1967.

Court membership
- Chief Justice John Roberts Associate Justices John P. Stevens · Antonin Scalia; Anthony Kennedy · David Souter; Clarence Thomas · Ruth Bader Ginsburg; Stephen Breyer · Samuel Alito

Case opinions
- Majority: Alito, joined by Stevens, Kennedy, Souter, Ginsburg, Breyer
- Dissent: Roberts, joined by Scalia, Thomas (all but Part I)
- Dissent: Thomas, joined by Scalia

Laws applied
- Age Discrimination in Employment Act of 1967, 29 U.S.C. § 633a(a)

Gomez-Perez v. Potter, 553 U.S. 474 (2008), is a labor law case of the United States Supreme Court holding that federal employees can assert claims for retaliation resulting from filing an age discrimination complaint. The case continued the Court's long-standing position that cause for action following retaliation can be inferred in civil rights legislation, even though the law does not explicitly provide protection against victimization.

The case is important because it signaled a willingness by recently appointed Justice Samuel Alito to continue the Court's expansive interpretation of civil rights laws.

== Background ==
Myrna Gómez-Pérez worked for the United States Postal Service as a part-time window distribution clerk in Puerto Rico. Ms. Gómez-Pérez sought a transfer to a full-time position; however, her supervisor denied her request. Ms. Gómez-Pérez alleged that the supervisor denied the request based on her age and filed an EEO complaint on the basis of age discrimination. Subsequently, Ms. Gómez-Pérez alleged that, as a result of filing her complaint, in retaliation she was subjected to a series of reprisals that included groundless charges of sexual harassment, substantial reductions in her hours, and being harassed and mocked by her co-workers. As a result, she filed a retaliation complaint.

== Opinion of the Court ==
The Supreme Court held that federal employees can assert claims for retaliation resulting from filing an age discrimination complaint.

Even though it is not explicitly in the Civil Rights Act, the existence of the right can be inferred from the Act's scheme, as necessary to make the rights effective.

== See also ==
- US labor law
- List of United States Supreme Court cases, volume 553
