= Worker Adjustment and Retraining Notification Act of 1988 =

United States labor law

Worker Adjustment and Retraining Notification Act
- Long title: An Act To require advance notification of plant closings and mass layoffs, and for other purposes
- Acronyms (colloquial): WARN Act
- Enacted by: the 100th United States Congress

Citations
- Public law: Pub. L. 100–379
- Statutes at Large: 102 Stat. 890

Codification
- Titles amended: 29 U.S.C.: Labor
- U.S.C. sections created: 29 U.S.C. §§ 2101–2109

Legislative history
- Introduced in the Senate as S. 2527 by Howard Metzenbaum (D-OH) on June 16, 1988; Passed the Senate on July 6, 1988 (72–23); Passed the House on July 13, 1988 (286–136); Left unsigned by President Ronald Reagan and became law on August 4, 1988

The Worker Adjustment and Retraining Notification Act of 1988 (the "WARN Act") is a U.S. labor law that protects employees, their families, and communities by requiring most employers with 100 or more employees to provide notification 60 calendar days in advance of planned closings and mass layoffs of employees.

Employees entitled to notice under the WARN Act include managers and supervisors, hourly wage, and salaried workers. The WARN Act requires that notice also be given to employees' representatives (e.g., a labor union), the local chief elected official (e.g. the mayor), and the state dislocated worker unit. The advance notice is intended to give workers and their families transition time to adjust to the prospective loss of employment, to seek and to obtain other employment, and if necessary, to enter skill training or retraining programs that would allow these workers to successfully compete in the job market.

== Covered workers ==
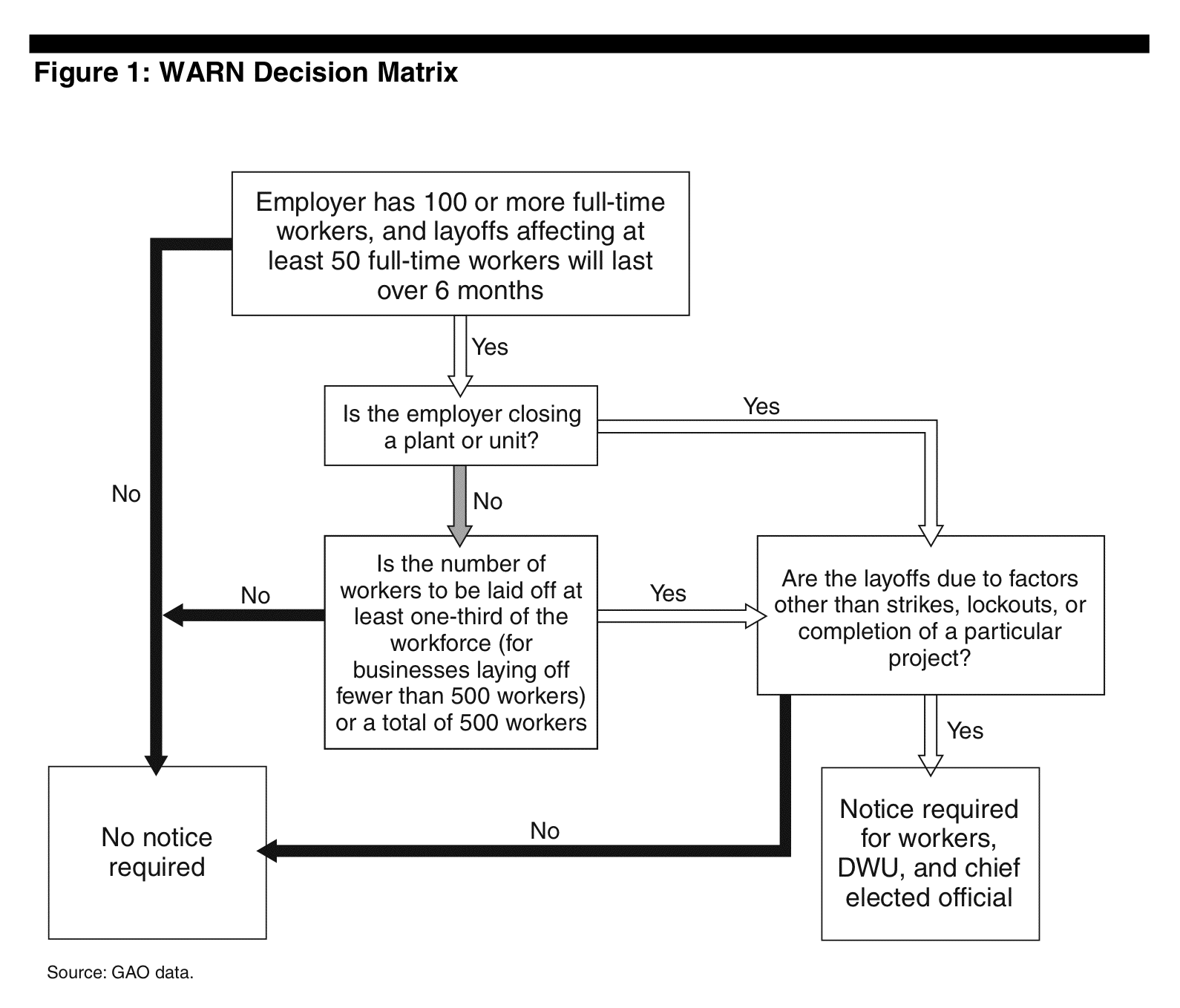
WARN Act Decision Matrix

Generally, the WARN Act covers employers with 100 or more employees, not counting those who have worked fewer than six months in the last twelve-month work period, or those who work an average of less than 20 hours a week. Employees entitled to advance notice under the WARN Act include managers, supervisors, hourly wage, and salaried workers. Often, WARN Act problems arise when employers are acquired by other companies.

Employees unprotected by the WARN Act include:

- Workers participating in strike actions, or workers who have been locked out in a labor dispute
- Workers employed on temporary projects or the work facilities of the business who clearly understand the temporary nature of the work when hired
- Business partners, consultants, and contract employees assigned to the closing business, but who have a separate employment relationship with another, second employer and who are paid by that other, second employer, and those business partners, consultants, and contract employees who are self-employed
- Regular federal, state, and local government employees

== Exceptions to the WARN Act ==
The WARN Act is not activated when a covered employer:

- closes a temporary facility or completes a temporary project, and the employees working in the facility or temporary project were hired with the clear understanding that their employment would end with the closing of the work facility or the completion of the project; or
- closes a facility or operating unit because of a strike or a worker lock-out, and the closing is not intended to evade the purposes of the WARN Act.
- If a plant closing or a mass layoff results in fewer than 50 workers losing their jobs at a single employment site;
- If 50 to 499 workers lose their jobs and that number is less than 33% of the employer's total, active workforce at a single employment site;
- If a layoff is for 6 months or less; or
- If work hours are not reduced 50% in each month of any 6-month period.

There are three exceptions to the full 60-day notice requirement; however, the notice must be provided as soon as practicable, even when these exceptions apply, and the employer must provide a statement of the reason for shortening the notice requirement in addition to fulfilling other notice information requirements. These three exceptions are:

- Faltering company: When, before a plant closing, a company is actively seeking capital or business and reasonably, in good faith, believes that advance notice would preclude its ability to obtain such capital or business, and this new capital or business would allow the employer to avoid or postpone the shutdown for a reasonable period;
- Unforeseeable business circumstances: When the closing or mass layoff is caused by business circumstances that were not reasonably foreseeable at the time that the 60-day notice would have been required (i.e., a business circumstance caused by some sudden, dramatic, and unexpected action or condition beyond the employer's control, such as unexpected cancellation of a major contract); or
- Natural disaster: When a plant closing or mass layoff is the direct result of a natural disaster such as a flood, earthquake, drought, storm, tidal wave or the similar effects of nature. In such cases, notice may be given after the event.

Exceptions are often claimed by employers in bankruptcy cases, and bankruptcy courts must often determine how the WARN Act applies. Generally, the WARN Act's requirements and penalties apply when an employer continues to run the business in bankruptcy, rather than close the business, and also when an employer plans a closing or mass layoff before filing bankruptcy. The WARN Act does not apply to a trustee in bankruptcy whose sole function is to close the business.

== Penalties ==
An employer who violates WARN provisions is liable to each employee for an amount equal to back pay and benefits for the period of the violation, up to 60 days. The liability may be reduced by the period of any notice that was given and any voluntary payments that the employer made to the employee, sometimes referred to as "pay in lieu of notice".

U.S. district courts enforce WARN requirements. Workers, representatives of employees, and units of local government may bring individual or class action suits. Courts may allow reasonable attorney's fees as part of any final judgment. The U.S. Department of Labor is responsible to educate and inform employers and employees about WARN, and to provide assistance in understanding the regulations, but is not responsible for enforcing WARN.

== State and local laws ==
In addition to the WARN Act, which is a federal law, several states have enacted similar acts that require advance notice or severance payments to employees facing job loss from a mass layoff or plant closing. For example, California requires advance notice for plant closings, layoffs, and relocations of 50 or more employees regardless of percentage of workforce, that is, without the federal "one-third" rule for mass layoffs of fewer than 500 employees. Also, the California law applies to employers with 75 or more employees, counting both full-time and part-time employees.

The following states and localities have passed state or local WARN Acts.

- California
- Hawaii
- Illinois
- Iowa
- Maine
- Massachusetts
- Michigan (voluntary)
- Minnesota (voluntary)
- New Hampshire
- New Jersey
- New York
- Tennessee
- Washington
- Wisconsin
- City of Philadelphia

A number of states have laws that create ancillary duties at the time of job layoffs; but which generally do not seek to mandate advance notice or severance payments to workers in a manner similar to the federal WARN Act, other states' statutes, or the laws found in Canadian or European jurisdictions.

Maryland, Missouri, Oklahoma, and Pennsylvania have statutes that require filing certain disclosure statements when businesses are the takeover targets of other corporations or when businesses are being dissolved. The statements generally require disclosure of plans to close facilities in the state.

Connecticut requires employers to maintain health insurance for a certain period of time following the relocation of operations.

Kansas requires the notification of state officials when businesses plan to close facilities or significantly cut production in select industries.

Maryland, Michigan, and Minnesota have statutes that ask employers to voluntarily provide advance notice to workers in the event of mass layoffs; however these states do not require compliance with the state's statute.

Montana and Nevada statutes require advance notice to certain public employees facing layoff.

Oregon and Tennessee have laws that simply implement the federal WARN Act.

South Carolina requires that employers provide the same notice to laid off workers that workers are contractually required to provide to the employer when leaving their employment.

Ohio requires that state unemployment agency officials be notified several days in advance of mass layoffs.

The New York State Worker Adjustment and Retraining Notification (WARN) Act requires businesses to give early warning of closing and layoffs. The law is stricter on employers when compared to the federal WARN Act. It applies to companies with 50 or more employees (unlike 100 for the federal law) where either 25 (50 for the federal law) or more workers are affected, if that number makes up at least 33% of the workers on that site. NY WARN Act requires a 90-day notice from the employer, unlike the federal act, which requires a 60-day notice.

== History ==
The WARN Act was passed by a Democratic controlled Congress with sufficient Republican support and abstention to achieve the 66% super-majority required to overcome President Ronald Reagan's refusal to sign the bill. The WARN Act became law in August 1988 and took effect in 1989.

In light of sequestration set to take effect after January 2, 2013, the Obama Administration issued guidance saying "it is neither necessary nor appropriate for Federal contractors to provide WARN Act notice to employees 60 days in advance of the potential sequestration because of uncertainty about whether sequestration will occur."

== Review ==
The U.S. Government Accountability Office (GAO) reviewed the WARN Act in 1993 and 2003. The GAO found that certain definitions and requirements of WARN are difficult to apply when employers and employees assess the applicability of WARN to their circumstances. The GAO recommended amending the WARN Act to simplify the calculation of thresholds, clarify the definition of employer, clarify how damages are calculated, and establish a uniform statute of limitations.

== See also ==
- United States labor law
- Transfer of Undertakings (Protection of Employment) Regulations 2006 and TULRCA 1992 section 188 from UK labour law
- Filmation Associates, the first company to fall victim to the WARN Act
