= Look into My Eyes =

Look into My Eyes may refer to:

- "Look into My Eyes" (Gotham), 2016 television episode
- Look into My Eyes (film), 2024 documentary film

== Songs ==
- "Look into My Eyes" (Bone Thugs-n-Harmony song), 1997
- "Look into My Eyes" (Fayray song), 2004
- "Look into My Eyes" (George Lamond song), 1990
- "Look into My Eyes", by Benzino from the 2005 album Arch Nemesis
- "Look into My Eyes", by Brando, 2020
- "Look into My Eyes", by Outlandish, 2005
- "Look into My Eyes", by Janelle Monáe from the 2013 album The Electric Lady
- "Look into My Eyes", by Nancy Kwai from the 2024 album Premiere

== See also ==
- Look Me in the Eye (disambiguation)
