= Gregory v. Ashcroft =

United States Supreme Court case dealing with commandeering/preemption distinction

- Supreme Court of the United States

Argued March 18, 1991 Decided June 20, 1991
- Full case name: Gregory et al., Judges v. Ashcroft, Governor of Missouri
- Citations: 501 U.S. 452 (more)

Holding
- Missouri's requirement that its judges retire by age 70 violates neither the Age Discrimination in Employment Act of 1967 nor the Equal Protection Clause.

Court membership
- Chief Justice William Rehnquist Associate Justices Byron White · Thurgood Marshall; Harry Blackmun · John P. Stevens; Sandra Day O'Connor · Antonin Scalia; Anthony Kennedy · David Souter

Case opinions
- Majority: O'Connor, joined by Rehnquist, Scalia, Kennedy, Souter; White, Stevens (in part)
- Concur/dissent: White, joined by Stevens
- Dissent: Blackmun, joined by Marshall

Laws applied
- Age Discrimination in Employment Act of 1967 and the Equal Protection Clause

Gregory v. Ashcroft, 501 U.S. 452 (1991) was a U.S. Supreme Court case. It concerned a provision in the Missouri state constitution that required state judges to retire at the age of 70, and the court was asked to consider whether it conflicted with the 1967 federal Age Discrimination in Employment Act (ADEA) and the Equal Protection Clause of the Fourteenth Amendment to the United States Constitution. The provision was upheld, with the case being one of several Supreme Court decisions supporting the principle that "ambiguous language will not be interpreted to intrude on areas of traditional state authority or important state governmental functions".

== Facts ==
Two Missouri state judges brought suit against John D. Ashcroft, the Governor of Missouri, alleging a provision of the Missouri state constitution, Article V, § 26, violated both the ADEA and the Equal Protection Clause. The provision required all non-municipal state judges to retire at the age of seventy. The United States District Court for the Eastern District of Missouri granted the governor’s motion to dismiss on the grounds that Missouri's appointed judges were not protected by the ADEA because they were "appointees ... 'on a policymaking level'" and were therefore excluded from the Act's definition of "employee". The United States Court of Appeals for the Eighth Circuit affirmed the policymaking distinction, further holding that the provision did not violate the Fourteenth Amendment because there was a rational basis for distinguishing judges who had reached the age of seventy from those who had not. The U.S. Supreme Court granted certiorari on both the ADEA and equal protection questions.

== Judgment ==
In a 7–2 decision, the Court held that the Missouri constitutional provision did not violate federal statute or the Equal Protection Clause. Justice O'Connor, writing for the majority, held that under the principles of federalism and dual sovereignty, the Supremacy Clause allows Congress to impose its will on the states, but only when acting under a Constitutionally-delegated power. The Court applied the 'plain statement' rule, the idea that Congress should make its intention 'clear and manifest' if it intends to alter the federal-state balance of power and pre-empt the historic powers of the states. The opinion recognized the authority of the people of the states to determine the qualifications of their most important government officials as a power that lies at 'the heart of representative government'. The Court found that state judges were not clearly 'employees' as defined by the ADEA (29 U.S.C. § 630(f)) and concluded that the statute did not plainly cover appointed state judges. The Court also found a rational basis for the retirement age, based in Missouri citizens' interest in maintaining a judiciary fully capable of performing the demanding tasks that judges must perform and the fact that physical and mental capacity sometimes diminishes with age.

Justice White, with Justice Stevens joining, concurred in part and dissented in part. The concurrence found the majority's federalism concerns irrelevant to the "actual conflict" preemption, arguing that the cases cited for the plain statement rule involved issues of whether Congress intended for legislation to apply to states at all. The concurrence further argued that the majority's decision directly contravened the decisions in Garcia v. San Antonio Metropolitan Transit Authority (1985) and South Carolina v. Baker (1988). The concurrence agreed with the majority judgment because it found that the state judges were not included in the ADEA's definition of 'employee'.

Justice Blackmun, joined by Justice Marshall, dissented, on the grounds that an appointed state judge is an "appointee on the policymaking level". They would instead have "deferred to the EEOC's interpretation of the statute", which "regarded the state judges as covered under the ADEA".

== Legacy ==
The holding in Gregory v. Ashcroft imposed a stricter burden on Congress to state clearly its intent to extend federal statutes to state and local governmental functions. This decision relied on the 'plain statement' rule, but the Supreme Court required more than an expression of Congress's clear and unequivocal intent to extend federal regulation to the states; the majority's interpretation of the rule required Congress to state clearly and specifically its intention to extend the ADEA to appointed state judges in particular.
