= Hazen Paper Co. v. Biggins =

- Supreme Court of the United States

Argued January 13, 1993, 1993 Decided April 20, 1993, 1993
- Full case name: Hazen Paper Company, et al., Petitioners v. Walter F. Biggins
- Citations: 507 U.S. 604 (more)

Court membership
- Chief Justice William Rehnquist Associate Justices Byron White · Harry Blackmun; John P. Stevens · Sandra Day O'Connor; Antonin Scalia · Anthony Kennedy; David Souter · Clarence Thomas

Case opinions
- Majority: O'Connor, joined by unanimous
- Concurrence: Kennedy, joined by Rehnquist, Thomas

Laws applied
- Age Discrimination in Employment Act of 1967

Hazen Paper Co. v. Biggins, 507 U.S. 604 (1993), was a United States Supreme Court case in which the court held that a disparate treatment claim cannot succeed unless the employee's protected trait had a determinative influence on the employer's decisionmaking.

== Background ==
Hazen Paper fired Biggins, 62, a few weeks before his service would have reached the required number of years for his pension to vest. Biggins sued Hazen Paper alleging a violation of the Age Discrimination in Employment Act of 1967.

== See also ==
- List of United States Supreme Court cases
- Lists of United States Supreme Court cases by volume
