= Kimel v. Florida Board of Regents =

- Supreme Court of the United States

Argued October 13, 1999 Decided January 11, 2000
- Full case name: J. Daniel Kimel, Jr. et al. v. Florida Board of Regents et al.
- Citations: 528 U.S. 62 (more) 120 S. Ct. 631, 81 Fair Empl.Prac.Cas. (BNA) 970, 187 A.L.R. Fed. 543, 76 Empl. Prac. Dec. (CCH) ¶ 46,190, 145 L. Ed. 2d 522, 68 U.S.L.W. 4016, 140 Ed. Law Rep. 825, 23 Employee Benefits Cas. 2945, 00 Cal. Daily Op. Serv. 229, 2000 Daily Journal D.A.R. 293, 2000 CJ C.A.R. 190, 13 Fla. L. Weekly Fed. S 25

Holding
- The U.S. Congress's enforcement powers under the Fourteenth Amendment to the Constitution do not extend to the abrogation of state sovereign immunity under the Eleventh Amendment over complaints of discrimination that is rationally based on age. Therefore, private litigants cannot obtain money damages from the states for violations of the Age Discrimination in Employment Act of 1967.

Court membership
- Chief Justice William Rehnquist Associate Justices John P. Stevens · Sandra Day O'Connor; Antonin Scalia · Anthony Kennedy; David Souter · Clarence Thomas; Ruth Bader Ginsburg · Stephen Breyer

Case opinions
- Majority: O'Connor, joined by Rehnquist, Scalia, Kennedy, Thomas (Parts I, II, and IV); Rehnquist, Stevens, Scalia, Souter, Ginsburg, Breyer (Part III)
- Concur/dissent: Stevens, joined by Souter, Ginsburg, Breyer
- Concur/dissent: Thomas, joined by Kennedy

Laws applied
- U.S. Const. amends. XI, XIV

Kimel v. Florida Board of Regents, 528 U.S. 62 (2000), was a US Supreme Court case that determined that the US Congress's enforcement powers under the Fourteenth Amendment to the US Constitution did not extend to the abrogation of state sovereign immunity under the Eleventh Amendment over complaints of discrimination that is rationally based on age.

== Facts and result ==
Employees of Florida State University and Florida International University, including J. Daniel Kimel, Jr., sued under the Age Discrimination in Employment Act (ADEA) of 1967 because the failure to adjust pay had a disparate impact on older employees. Wellington Dickson sued his employer, the Florida Department of Corrections, for not promoting him because of his age. Roderick MacPherson and Marvin Narz, who were associate professors at the University of Montevallo in Alabama, sued under the ADEA and alleged an evaluation system that discriminated against the elderly. The cases of Kimel, Dickson, MacPherson and Narz were consolidated on appeal to the Eleventh Circuit and remained consolidated when the Supreme Court granted certiorari.

Kimel invalidated the ADEA insofar as it allowed plaintiffs to sue states for money damages.

== Legal background ==
Kimel concerned the ability of Congress to override the states' "sovereign immunity" using its power under the Fourteenth Amendment. Sovereign immunity is a principle that originally comes from English law and referred to the immunity of the English monarch from suits. Sovereign immunity, according to the Supreme Court in Hans v. Louisiana (1890), normally prevents a state from being sued by its own citizens in federal court. That bar from suits, the Court stated, came from the Eleventh Amendment even though the express terms of the amendment provide only that citizens of one state cannot sue another state.

In Fitzpatrick v. Bitzer (1976), however, the Court made an exception to that usual rule. Fitzpatrick held that Congress could use its power under Section 5 of the Fourteenth Amendment, which allows Congress to enforce the substantive terms of the Fourteenth Amendment, including the Equal Protection Clause, by positive legislation, to override state sovereign immunity. However, in 1997, in City of Boerne v. Flores, the Court limited congressional power to override state sovereign immunity using the Fourteenth Amendment. For the first time, it required "congruence and proportionality" between the constitutional wrong and the congressionally-enacted remedy to protect constitutional rights. Boerne held that only the Supreme Court could determine what constituted a constitutional wrong, and Congress was not allowed to increase the level of constitutional protection beyond what the Court had recognized. Specifically, Boerne interpreted the scope of Section 5 of the Fourteenth Amendment, which states, "The Congress shall have power to enforce, by appropriate legislation, the provisions of this article."

The Court in Kimel based its decision in large part on Boerne. The importance of Kimel was the strict limits it placed on the ability of Congress to abrogate the states' sovereign immunity under Section 5 of the Fourteenth Amendment.

== Decision ==
Justice O'Connor wrote the majority opinion and stated that Congress, in enacting the ADEA, had properly declared its intent to subject states to suits for money damages by private individuals. The Court then noted that under its own equal protection jurisprudence, "age is not a suspect classification," and laws that classify on the basis of age need to pass only the Court's "rational basis review" test, as opposed to legal classifications based on race or gender if a "history of purposeful unequal treatment" leads the Court to apply strict scrutiny to such laws. The Court then contrasted rational basis review with the ADEA, which prohibits all employment discrimination on the basis of age except if age is a "bona fide occupational qualification." The Court concluded that the ADEA "prohibits substantially more state employment decisions and practices than would likely be held unconstitutional under the applicable equal protection, rational basis standard." Therefore, the ADEA's remedy failed the "congruence and proportionality" test required by Boerne and so it was not "a valid exercise of constitutional authority" under Section 5 of the Fourteenth Amendment.

In explaining the application of rational basis review to classifications based on age, the majority stated:

Age classifications, unlike governmental conduct based on race or gender, cannot be characterized as "so seldom relevant to the achievement of any legitimate state interest that laws grounded in such considerations are deemed to reflect prejudice and antipathy....

States may discriminate on the basis of age without offending the Fourteenth Amendment if the age classification in question is rationally related to a legitimate state interest. The rationality commanded by the Equal Protection Clause does not require States to match age distinctions and the legitimate interests they serve with razorlike precision. ...

Under the Fourteenth Amendment, a State may rely on age as a proxy for other qualities, abilities, or characteristics that are relevant to the State's legitimate interests. The Constitution does not preclude reliance on such generalizations. That age proves to be an inaccurate proxy in any individual case is irrelevant. [W]here rationality is the test, a State does not violate the Equal Protection Clause merely because the classifications made by its laws are imperfect. (internal quotation marks and citations omitted)

Justice Stevens wrote a dissenting opinion that stated, "There is not a word in the text of the Constitution supporting the Court's conclusion that the judge-made doctrine of sovereign immunity limits Congress' power to authorize private parties, as well as federal agencies, to enforce federal law against the States." Justice Stevens referred to the doctrine of sovereign immunity as expanded by Seminole Tribe v. Florida and Alden v. Maine as "judicial activism."

== See also ==
- List of United States Supreme Court cases, volume 528
- List of United States Supreme Court cases
- Lists of United States Supreme Court cases by volume
