= Good cause =

Legal term

Good cause is a legal term denoting adequate or substantial grounds or reason to take a certain action, or to fail to take an action prescribed by law. What constitutes a good cause is usually determined on a case-by-case basis and is thus relative.

Often the court or other legal body determines whether a particular fact or facts amount to a good cause. For example, if a party to a case has failed to take legal action before a particular statute of limitations has expired, the court might decide that the said party preserves its rights nonetheless, since that party's serious illness is a good cause, or justification for having additional time to take the legal action.

== See also ==
- Employment law
