= EEOC v. Wyoming =

- Supreme Court of the United States

Argued October 5, 1982 Decided March 2, 1983
- Full case name: Equal Employment Opportunity Commission v. State of Wyoming
- Docket no.: 81-554
- Citations: 460 U.S. 226 (more)

Holding
- The court held the Age Discrimination in Employment Act of 1967 makes it unlawful for an employer to discriminate against any employee or potential employee between the ages of 40 and 70 on the basis of age, except "where age is a bona fide occupational qualification reasonably necessary to the normal operation of the particular business. or where the differentiation is based on reasonable factors other than age."

Court membership
- Chief Justice Warren E. Burger Associate Justices William J. Brennan Jr. · Byron White; Thurgood Marshall · Harry Blackmun; Lewis F. Powell Jr. · William Rehnquist; John P. Stevens · Sandra Day O'Connor

Case opinions
- Majority: Brennan, joined by White, Marshall, Blackmun, Stevens
- Concurrence: Stevens
- Dissent: Burger, joined by Powell, Rehnquist, O'Connor
- Dissent: Powell, joined by O'Connor

Laws applied
- Age Discrimination in Employment Act of 1967; Commerce Clause

EEOC v. Wyoming, 460 U.S. 226 (1983), is a United States Supreme Court case about forcible retirement of an employee of the Wyoming Game and Fish Department. The court held the Age Discrimination in Employment Act of 1967 makes it unlawful for an employer to discriminate against any employee or potential employee between the ages of 40 and 70 on the basis of age, except "where age is a bona fide occupational qualification reasonably necessary to the normal operation of the particular business. or where the differentiation is based on reasonable factors other than age."

The EEOC was represented by Solicitor General Rex E. Lee.
