= Lockheed Corp. v. Spink =

- Supreme Court of the United States

Argued April 22, 1996 Decided June 10, 1996
- Full case name: Lockheed Corp., et al. v. Spink
- Docket no.: 95-809
- Citations: 517 U.S. 882 (more) 116 S. Ct. 1783; 135 L. Ed. 2d 153; 1996 U.S. LEXIS 3717

Case history
- Prior: Spink v. Lockheed Corp., 60 F.3d 616 (9th Cir. 1995); cert. granted, 516 U.S. 1087 (1996).

Court membership
- Chief Justice William Rehnquist Associate Justices John P. Stevens · Sandra Day O'Connor; Antonin Scalia · Anthony Kennedy; David Souter · Clarence Thomas; Ruth Bader Ginsburg · Stephen Breyer

Case opinions
- Majority: Thomas, joined by Rehnquist, Stevens, O'Connor, Scalia, Kennedy, Ginsburg; Souter and Breyer (all but Part III-B)
- Concur/dissent: Breyer, joined by Souter

Laws applied
- Employee Retirement Income Security Act of 1974, 29 U.S.C. § 1106(a)(1)(D)

Lockheed Corp. v. Spink, 517 U.S. 882 (1996), is a US labor law case, concerning occupational pensions.

== Facts ==
Paul Spink was denied full benefits from Lockheed Corporation after being rehired in 1988. He claimed that an amendment of the plan, to exclude people over 61, violated § 406(a)(1)(D) of the Employee Retirement Income Security Act of 1974 (ERISA), which prohibits a fiduciary from causing a plan to engage in a transaction that transfers plan assets to, or involves the use of plan assets for the benefit of, a party in interest.

== Judgment ==
Justice Thomas, writing for the majority, ruled that employers could amend plans. They were not bound by fiduciary duties while acting as sponsors.

Justices Breyer and Souter dissented in part, preferring to withhold expression of any view on the proposition that "the payment of benefits pursuant to an amended plan, regardless of what the plan requires of the employee in return for those benefits, does not constitute a prohibited transaction."

== See also ==
- United States labor law
