= Rulings of the Constitutional Court of Thailand =

Decisions of Thailand's Constitutional Court

The rulings of the Constitutional Court of Thailand have, since the Court's establishment in 1998, had an important impact on Thai politics and jurisprudence. Major rulings having included the 1999 ruling that Deputy Minister of Agriculture Newin Chidchop could retain his Cabinet seat after being sentenced to imprisonment for defamation, the 2001 acquittal of Thaksin Shinawatra for filing an incomplete statement with the National Counter-Corruption Committee, the 2003 invalidation of Jaruvan Maintaka appointment as Auditor-General, and the 2006 invalidation of the nationwide results of a House election.

== Chuan-government emergency decrees during the 1997 economic crisis ==
=== Unconstitutionality of emergency economic decrees ===
In its very first decision, the Court ruled on the constitutionality of four emergency executive decrees issued by the Chuan government to deal with the Asian financial crisis. The government had issued the decrees in early May 1998 to expand the role of the Financial Restructuring Authority and the Assets Management Corporation, to settle the debts of the Financial Institutions Development Fund through the issue of 500 billion THB in bonds, and to authorize the Ministry of Finance to seek 200 billion THB in overseas loans. The opposition New Aspiration Party (NAP) did not have the votes to defeat the bills, and therefore, on the last day of debate, invoked Article 219 of the Constitution to question the constitutionality of an emergency decree.

The NAP argued that since there was no emergency nor necessary urgency (under Article 218(2)), the government could not issue any emergency decrees. Article 219, however, specifically notes the constitutionality of an emergency decree can be questioned only on Article 218(1) concerning the maintenance of national or public safety, national economic security, or to avert public calamity. The government, fearing further economic damage if the decree were delayed, opposed the Court's acceptance of the complaint, as the opposition clearly had failed to cite the proper constitutional clause. The Court wished to set a precedent, however, demonstrating it would accept petitions under Article 219, even if technically inaccurate. Within a day it ruled that it was obvious to the general public that the nation was in an economic crisis, and that the decrees were designed to assist with national economic security in accordance with Article 218(1). The decrees were later quickly approved by Parliament.

The NAP's last minute motion damaged its credibility, and made it unlikely that Article 219 will be invoked unless there is a credible issue and the issue is raised and discussed at the beginning of Parliamentary debate, rather than at the last-minute before a vote.

On the other hand, a precedent was established by the Court that it would accept all petitions under Article 219 to preserve Parliament's right to question the constitutionality of emergency executive decrees.

== Thaksin Shinawatra and the allegation of hiding assets and stocks ==
After the sounding victory of Thaksin Shinawatra's party, Thai Rak Thai, in 2001 election, the Anti-Corruption Committee filed a case charging him as hiding a handful of assets in form of stocks, which is unlawful due to the 1997 Constitution. According to Thai law, senior government officials are required to declare their assets, along with those of their spouses and children under the age of 20, to the NCCC when they start and finish their terms in office. However Thaksin could escape the guilt as the judges ruled 8 to 7. Thaksin said it was his 'honest mistake'.

=== Treaty status of IMF letters of intent ===
The NAP later filed impeachment proceedings with the National Counter Corruption Commission (NCCC) against Prime Minister Chuan Leekpai and the Minister of Finance Tarrin Nimmanahaeminda for violation of the Constitution. The NAP argued that the letter of intent that the government signed with the International Monetary Fund (IMF) to secure emergency financial support was a treaty, and that Article 224 of the Constitution stipulated that the government must receive prior consent from Parliament to enter a treaty.

The NCCC determined the issue concerned a constitutional interpretation and petitioned the Constitutional Court for an opinion. The Court ruled the IMF letters were not treaties, as internationally defined, because they were unilateral documents from the Thai government with no rules for enforcement or provisions for penalty. Moreover, the IMF itself had worded the letters in a way that stated that the letters were not contractual agreements.

== Appointment of Jaruvan Maintaka as Auditor-General ==
On 24 June 2003, a petition was filed with the Constitutional Court seeking its ruling on the constitutionality of Jaruvan Maintaka's appointment by the Senate as Auditor-General. Jaruvan was one of three nominees for the position of auditor-general in 2001, along with Prathan Dabpet and Nontaphon Nimsomboon. Prathan received 5 votes from the 8-person State Audit Commission (SAC) chairman while Jaruvan received 3 votes. According to the constitution, State Audit Commission chairman Panya Tantiyavarong should have submitted Prathan's nomination to the Senate, as he received the majority of votes. However, on July 3, 2001, the SAC Chairman submitted a list of all three candidates for the post of auditor-general to the Senate, which later voted to select Khunying Jaruvan Maintaka.

The Constitutional Court ruled on 6 July 2004 that the selection process that led to the appointment of Jaruvan as Auditor-General was unconstitutional. The Court noted that the Constitution empowers the SAC to nominate only one person with the highest number of votes from a simple majority, not three as had been the case. The court stopped short of saying if she had to leave her post. However, when the Constitutional Court had ruled on 4 July 2002 that the then Election Commission chairman Sirin Thoopklam's election to the body was unconstitutional, the President of the Court noted "When the court rules that the selection [process] was unconstitutional and has to be redone, the court requires the incumbent to leave the post".

However, Jaruwan refused to resign without a royal dismissal from King Bhumibol Adulyadej. She noted ""I came to take the position as commanded by a royal decision, so I will leave the post only when directed by such a decision." The State Audit Commission later nominated Wisut Montriwat, former deputy permanent secretary of the Ministry of Finance, for the post of Auditor-General. The Senate approved the nomination on 10 May 2005. However, King Bhumibol Adulyadej, in an unprecedented move, withheld his royal assent. The National Assembly did not hold a vote to overthrow the royal veto. In October 2005 the Senate rejected a motion to reaffirm her appointment, and instead deferred the decision to the SAC.

On 15 February 2006 The State Audit Commission (SAC) decided to reinstate Auditor-General Khunying Jaruvan Maintaka. Its unanimous decision came after it received a memo from the Office of King Bhumibol Adulyadej's Principal Private Secretary, advising that the situation be resolved.

The controversy led many to reinterpret the political and judicial role of the King in Thailand's constitutional monarchy.

== Thaksin Shinawatra's alleged conflicts of interest ==
In February 2006, 28 Senators submitted a petition to the Constitutional Court calling for the Prime Minister's impeachment for conflicts of interest and improprieties in the sell-off of Shin Corporation under Articles 96, 216 and 209 of the Thai constitution. The Senators said the Prime Minister violated the Constitution and was no longer qualified for office under Article 209. However, the Court rejected the petition on 16 February, with the majority judges saying the petition failed to present sufficient grounds to support the prime minister's alleged misconduct.

== See also ==
- Constitutional Court of Thailand
- Constitution of Thailand
- History of Thailand since 2001
