= Western Air Lines, Inc. v. Criswell =

1985 U.S. Supreme Court case

- Supreme Court of the United States

Argued January 14, 1985 Decided June 17, 1985
- Full case name: Western Air Lines, Inc. v. Criswell
- Citations: 472 U.S. 400 (more)
- Argument: Oral argument

Court membership
- Chief Justice Warren E. Burger Associate Justices William J. Brennan Jr. · Byron White; Thurgood Marshall · Harry Blackmun; Lewis F. Powell Jr. · William Rehnquist; John P. Stevens · Sandra Day O'Connor

Case opinion
- Majority: Stevens, joined by Burger, Brennan, White, Blackmun, Powell, Rehnquist, O'Connor
- Marshall took no part in the consideration or decision of the case.

Laws applied
- Age Discrimination in Employment Act of 1967

Western Air Lines, Inc. v. Criswell, 472 U.S. 400 (1985), is a US labor law case before the United States Supreme Court concerning age discrimination.

== Background ==
Western Air Lines required flight engineers to retire at age 60. Plaintiffs were forced to retire at 60 and brought suit at the Federal District Court. Defendant argued that the age requirement was a bona fide occupational qualification that was reasonably necessary for the airline's safe operations. The case proceeded to trial and a jury found for the plaintiffs after a trial.

== Statutory background ==
The Age Discrimination in Employment Act of 1967 prohibits mandatory retirement prior to age 70, but section 4(f)(1) provides an exception: "where age is a bona fide occupational qualification reasonably necessary to the normal operation of the particular business."

== Opinion of the Court ==
The Supreme Court held that it was lawful to require airline pilots to retire at 60, because the Federal Aviation Administration forbade using pilots over 60 in aviation. But the Court held that refusing to employ flight engineers over that age was unjustified as there were no such FAA requirements.

== See also ==
- United States labor law
- ADEA
