= Mandatory retirement =

Set age at which people with certain professions must retire

Mandatory retirement, also known as forced retirement, enforced retirement or compulsory retirement, is the set age at which people who hold certain jobs or offices are required by industry custom or by law to leave their employment, or retire.

As of 2017, as reported by the Organisation for Economic Co-operation and Development (OECD), only three European Union member states (UK, Denmark and Poland) and four OECD countries (Canada, Australia, New Zealand, United States) had laws banning mandatory retirement.

== Rationale ==
Typically, mandatory retirement is justified by the argument that certain occupations are either too dangerous (military personnel) or require high levels of physical and mental skill (air traffic controllers, airline pilots). Most rely on the notion that a worker's productivity declines significantly after age 70, and the mandatory retirement is the employer's way to avoid reduced productivity. However, since the age at which retirement is mandated is often somewhat arbitrary and not based upon an actual physical evaluation of an individual person, many view the practice as a form of age discrimination, or ageism.

Economist Edward Lazear has argued that mandatory retirement can be an important tool for employers to construct wage contracts that prevent worker shirking. Employers can tilt the wage profile of a worker so that it is below marginal productivity early on and above marginal productivity toward the end of the employment relationship. In this way, the employer retains extra profits from the worker early on, which the employer returns in the later period if the worker has not shirked their duties or responsibilities in the first period (assuming a competitive market).

== Countries ==
=== Australia ===
Compulsory retirement is generally unlawful throughout the various State and Territory jurisdictions in Australia. Among exceptions to the general rule, permanent members of the Australian Defence Force must retire at the age of 60 and reservists at 65. As well, since the passage of a constitutional amendment in 1977, judges on federal courts are required to retire at the age of 70.

=== Brazil ===
The Constitution of Brazil says in Article 40, Paragraph 1, Item II, that all public servants in the Union, States, Cities and the Federal District shall mandatorily retire at the age of 75. This regulation encompasses servants from the executive, legislative and judicial branches. It also applies to the Supreme Federal Court Justices, as per Article 93, Item VI, of the Constitution, and the Court of Accounts of the Union Judges, as stated in Article 73, Paragraph 3 of the Constitution (disposition added after the 20th Amendment).

=== Canada ===
The normal age for retirement in Canada is 65, but one cannot be forced to retire at that age. Labour laws in the country do not specify a retirement age. Age 65 is when federal Old Age Security pension benefits begin, and most private and public retirement plans have been designed to provide income to the person starting at 65 (an age is needed to select premium payments by contributors to be able to calculate how much money is available to retirees when they leave the program by retiring).

All judges in Canada are subject to mandatory retirement, at 70 or 75 depending on the court. Federal senators cease to hold their seats at 75.

=== Ethiopia ===
Citizens of Ethiopia over the age of 60 must retire, though the retirement age may be further reduced for individuals working in particularly hazardous occupations. Retirees are often faced with loss of benefits and insufficient funds to handle daily expenses.

=== Ireland ===
The mandatory retirement age for members of the Garda Síochána with the rank of garda, inspector, and sergeant was increased from 57 years old to 60 years old in 2004. Later in 2024 it was increased for all members to 62 years old, under the An Garda Síochána Retirement Regulations 2024. Since then some members have been given permission to work until they are 64 years old.

=== Israel ===
A 2006 decision by Israel's High Court of Justice stated that mandatory retirement at age 67 does not discriminate against the elderly.

=== New Zealand ===
In New Zealand, there is normally no mandatory retirement age except in jobs that require one for a specific legal reason. The normal age of retirement is the same as the beginning of pension payments, which is 65.

The District Court Act 2014 establishes mandatory retirement for District Court judges at the age of 70. The Senior Courts Act 2016 does the same for High Court judges (including Court of Appeal and Supreme Court judges). The judicial retirement age has been criticised.

=== Philippines ===
Employees working in the government, who can retire as early as age 60, have a set mandatory retirement age of 65. Personnel including officials of the Philippine Armed Forces, the Philippine Coast Guard, the Philippine National Police, the Bureau of Fire Protection, and the Bureau of Jail Management and Penology are required to retire once they reach age 56. Judges are subject to mandatory retirement at 70.

In the private sector, it is illegal for employees and executives in the private sector to be forced to retire before age 65 with the exception of underground miners who are required to retire at age 60, and professional racehorse jockeys at age 55.

=== Russia ===
Russian federal law does not specify a mandatory retirement age for judges. Instead, judges' right to retire is based on the number of years in service:

1. After 20 years of service any judge can retire with full benefits.
2. If the judge served less than 20 years, they can retire at the age of 55 if male or 50 if female. The monetary value of the judge's pension depends on the number of years in service.
3. If the judge has worked for 25 years or more (with at least 10 years as a judge), they can retire with full pension benefits at the age of 60 if male or 55 if female.

=== South Korea ===
South Korea enforces compulsory retirement before age 60 at the latest to all private companies, and 65 for public sectors. However, it is custom for most companies to lay off their employees between the ages of 50 and 55.

=== United Kingdom ===
In October 2006 with the Employment Equality (Age) Regulations 2006, the UK Labour Government introduced a Default Retirement Age, whereby employers were able to terminate or deny employment to people over 65 without a reason. A legal challenge to this failed in September 2009, although a review of the legislation was expected in 2010 by the new Conservative/Liberal Democrat coalition government. This review took place and on 17 February 2011 BIS published the draft Regulations abolishing the Default Retirement Age. Revised regulations were later implemented and, as of 6 April 2011, employers can no longer give employees notice of retirement under Default Retirement Age provisions and will need to objectively justify any compulsory retirement age still in place to avoid age discrimination claims.

The Judicial Pensions and Retirement Act 1993 establishes mandatory retirement for judges at the age of 75. This was increased from 70 in 2022.

=== United States ===
Since 1986, mandatory retirement has been generally unlawful in the United States, except in certain industries and occupations that are regulated by law, and are often part of the government (such as military service and federal police agencies, including the Federal Bureau of Investigation). Earlier steps toward this include the Age Discrimination in Employment Act of 1967 (ADEA), which "protects individuals who are 40 years of age or older from employment discrimination based on age. The ADEA's protections apply to both employees and job applicants. Under the ADEA, it is unlawful to discriminate against a person because of his/her age with respect to any term, condition, or privilege of employment, including hiring, firing, promotion, layoff, compensation, benefits, job assignments, and training."

From the U.S. Code of Federal Regulations discussing the Age Discrimination in Employment Act:

…one of the original purposes of this provision, namely, that the exception does not authorize an employer to require or permit involuntary retirement of an employee within the protected age group on account of age,

…an employer can no longer force retirement or otherwise discriminate on the basis of age against an individual because (s)he is 70 or older.

==== Professions ====
- Military: Mandatory retirement at the age of 62, with the exception of General and Flag Officers at age 64.
- Pilots: the mandatory retirement age of airline pilots is 65. The Fair Treatment for Experienced Pilots Act (Public Law 110-135) went into effect on 13 December 2007, raising the age to 65 from the previous 60.
- Air traffic controllers: Mandatory retirement age of 56, with exceptions up to age 61. Most air traffic controllers are hired before the age of 31 (the hiring cutoff age for those with experience is 36).
- Foreign Service employees at the Department of State: Mandatory retirement at 65 with very narrow exceptions.
- Federal law enforcement officers, national park rangers and firefighters: Mandatory retirement age of 57, or later if less than 20 years of service.
- Judges of various state courts:
  - Florida Supreme Court justices: The Florida Constitution establishes mandatory retirement at age 70.
  - Maryland Constitution establishes mandatory retirement age of 70 for Circuit and Appellate Court judges.
  - Michigan Judges of all levels cannot run for election after passing the age of 70.
  - Minnesota has statutorily established mandatory retirement for all judges at age 70 (more precisely, at the end of the month a judge reaches that age). The Minnesota Legislature has had the constitutional right to set judicial retirement ages since 1956, but did not do so until 1973, setting the age at 70.
  - New Hampshire Constitution - Article 78 sets the retirement of all Judges and sheriffs at age 70.
  - New Jersey Supreme Court also established mandatory retirement at age 70. Judges of the New Jersey Superior Court and other inferior New Jersey courts must retire at age 70 or forfeit their pensions.
  - Oregon – mandatory judicial retirement age of 75.
  - Pennsylvania - Justices of the Pennsylvania Supreme Court must retire at the end of the year in which they turn 75.

== Religions ==
=== Roman Catholic Church ===
There is no mandatory retirement age for cardinals nor for the pope, as they hold these positions for life, but cardinals age 80 or over are prohibited from participating in the papal conclave as of 1970 because of the Ingravescentem aetatem. The Code of Canon Law specifies in Canon 401 that ordinary bishops, nuncios, and bishops with Curial appointments (but not auxiliary bishops) must present their resignation to the Pope when they turn 75, but he need not accept it right away or at all. Canon 538 makes a similar stipulation of diocesan priests who are requested, but not obliged, to offer to resign from their appointments at 75. Note that in either case, resigning from the active exercise of the office means giving up the daily responsibilities of the offices, not ordination itself. Once a man is ordained a priest or a bishop, he retains that character until his death, whether he is still working or has since retired.

=== Church of England ===
Ecclesiastical Offices (Age Limit) Measure 1975 sets age limit for the holding of certain ecclesiastical offices. Age limit applies to Offices of: Archbishops, Diocesan Bishops, Suffragan bishops, Deans of cathedral churches, Residentiary canons in a cathedral churches, including lay residentiary canons, Archdeacons, Incumbents of benefices, Vicars in team ministries established under the Pastoral Measure 1968, Vicars of guild churches, and any other holders of ecclesiastical offices who are subject to Common Tenure. The retirement age for them is set at 70 years.

== See also ==
- Ageism
- Pension
- Retirement
- Retirement age
- Up or out
