= Gross v. FBL Financial Services, Inc. =

Gross v. FBL Financial Services
- Supreme Court of the United States

Argued March 31, 2009 Decided June 18, 2009
- Full case name: Jack Gross, Petitioner v. FBL Financial Services, Inc.
- Docket no.: 08-441
- Citations: 557 U.S. 167 (more) 129 S. Ct. 2343; 174 L. Ed. 2d 119

Holding
- A plaintiff must prove, by preponderance of evidence, that age was the "but for" cause of the adverse employment action for an ADEA claim.

Court membership
- Chief Justice John Roberts Associate Justices John P. Stevens · Antonin Scalia; Anthony Kennedy · David Souter; Clarence Thomas · Ruth Bader Ginsburg; Stephen Breyer · Samuel Alito

Case opinions
- Majority: Thomas, joined by Roberts, Scalia, Kennedy, Alito
- Dissent: Stevens, joined by Souter, Ginsburg, Breyer
- Dissent: Breyer, joined by Souter, Ginsburg

Laws applied
- Age Discrimination in Employment Act (ADEA), 42 U.S.C. § 2000e-2

Gross v. FBL Financial Services, Inc., 557 U.S. 167, was a case decided by the Supreme Court of the United States in 2009. It involved the standard of proof required for a claim under the Age Discrimination in Employment Act (ADEA).

== Case history ==
Jack Gross, an employee of FBL Financial Services, Inc., was transferred to another position while a former subordinate took on many of Gross' old responsibilities. They both received the same compensation, but Gross believed his reassignment was a demotion. Gross brought suit against FBL in April 2004 in the U.S. District Court for the Southern District of Iowa, claiming ADEA violations. The District Court found in his favor and awarded him $46,945 in lost compensation. The United States Court of Appeals for the Eighth Circuit reversed the decision.

== Decision ==
The Supreme Court affirmed the appellate court's reversal, finding that a plaintiff must prove by a preponderance of the evidence, that age was the "but for" cause of the adverse employment action.

The Court interpreted the wording in the ADEA, "because of", to mean that the Act required the plaintiff employee to prove that age was the reason that resulted in the adverse employment action. Therefore, a standard higher than "motivating factor" would be required.
