= Barbara Macdonald =

American activist and social worker

Barbara Anne Macdonald
- Born: Barbara Anne Charles; September 11, 1913; Pomona, California, U.S.
- Died: June 15, 2000 (aged 86)
- Education: University of California, Berkeley, University of Washington
- Occupation: Social worker
- Known for: Feminist activism, especially relating to ageism

Barbara Anne Macdonald (nee Charles, September 11, 1913 – June 15, 2000) was an American social worker and lesbian feminist activist. She is best known for her activism against ageism.

== Early life and career ==
She was born as Barbara Charles in Pomona, California and grew up in La Habra, California. When she was 15, she left home and began to support herself as a domestic worker in Long Beach, California. She attended Long Beach Junior College from 1931 to 1932 and Santa Ana Junior College from 1932 to 1937. She was nearly expelled from Santa Ana Junior College for being a lesbian. She later attended University of California, Berkeley, from 1938 to 1940 where she supported herself as a stunt parachute jumper.

After graduating from Berkeley, she had a job at the WPA Vallejo Housing Authority. She later attended the University of Washington from 1950 to 1953 where she received her bachelor's degree and a masters of social work. She moved to Wenatchee, Washington, where she was a supervisor in Child Welfare Services. Macdonald would work as a social worker until she retired in 1974.

Macdonald was invited to talk at many different organizations throughout her life, including universities, social worker organizations and to "lesbian and feminist audiences". She was also invited to speak on international panels at the Non-governmental Organizations (NGO) forum at the 1995 United Nations World Conference on Women in Beijing.

== Activism against ageism ==
Macdonald began to think about aging in the late 1970s. When she was at a march in New England in 1978, she began to fall behind. The marshal of the parade noted her age and told her to move to another part of the line because she couldn't keep up. The incident taught Macdonald not to put her pride in strength because, as people age, they become weaker. Instead of feeling ashamed of her physical weakness, Macdonald decided to fight against ageism.

Macdonald saw ageism as a "central feminist issue" and made it the core of her activism. Macdonald felt that ageism divided women. She identified many aspects of age-related issues that affect older women, such as poverty, physical challenges caused by age, violence against older women, and health issues, all of which she felt were not adequately addressed by younger feminists. Macdonald felt that defining women by their familial roles was the central contributor to ageism. She felt that older women tend to be seen as caretakers and mother-figures, instead of as individuals.

In 1983, Macdonald and her partner, Cynthia Rich, published Look Me in the Eye: Old Women, Aging, and Ageism. The book was considered "extremely rare" by May Sarton and called "courageous" by Robin Morgan. In 1987, the book inspired the formation of the group Old Lesbians Organizing for Change.

After four years of lobbying to get the topic included at a women's studies conference, Macdonald gave a speech called "Outside the Sisterhood: Ageism in Women's Studies" to the National Women's Studies Association, at their June 22, 1985 plenary session on “Common Causes: Uncommon Coalitions” in Seattle; the speech emphasized ageism as an important feminist issue and discussed old women being denied humanity and reduced to stereotypes.

== Personal life ==
From 1930 to 1935, she was married to Elmo Davis. In 1941, she was very briefly married to John Macdonald. She adopted her husband's family name and used it throughout her life. In 1974, Macdonald met Cynthia Rich, who was teaching a feminist workshop that Macdonald attended. Rich and Macdonald became a couple and stayed together for twenty-six years.

Macdonald suffered from "debilitating memory loss" in the last four years of her life. She died of Alzheimer's disease on June 15, 2000.

== Bibliography ==
- Macdonald, Barbara; Rich, Cynthia (1983). Look Me in the Eye: Old Women, Aging and Ageism. Spinsters Ink Books. ISBN 978-1883523404.
- Macdonald, Barbara (1986). "Outside the Sisterhood: Ageism in Women's Studies". In Alexander, Jo (ed.). Women and Aging: An Anthology by Women. Carvallis, Oregon: Calyx Books. ISBN 978-0934971003.
- Macdonald, Barbara (2000). "Politics of Aging: I'm Not Your Mother". In Plott, Michele; Umanski, Lauri (eds.). Making Sense of Women's Lives: An Introduction to Women's Studies. Lanham, Maryland: Collegiate Press. pp. 438–442. ISBN 9780939693535.
- Macdonald, Barbara (2003). "The Politics of Aging". In Robin Morgan (ed.). Sisterhood Is Forever: The Women's Anthology for a New Millennium. New York City, New York: Washington Square Press. ISBN 0-7434-6627-6.
