= Smith v. City of Jackson =

- Supreme Court of the United States

Argued November 3, 2004 Decided March 30, 2005
- Full case name: Azel P. Smith, et al., Petitioners v. City of Jackson, Mississippi, et al.
- Docket no.: 03-1160
- Citations: 544 U.S. 228 (more)

Court membership
- Chief Justice William Rehnquist Associate Justices John P. Stevens · Sandra Day O'Connor; Antonin Scalia · Anthony Kennedy; David Souter · Clarence Thomas; Ruth Bader Ginsburg · Stephen Breyer

Case opinions
- Majority: Stevens (Parts I, II, IV), joined by Scalia, Souter, Ginsburg, Breyer
- Plurality: Stevens (Part III), joined by Souter, Ginsburg, Breyer
- Concurrence: Scalia (in part and judgment)
- Concurrence: O'Connor (in judgment), joined by Kennedy, Thomas
- Rehnquist took no part in the consideration or decision of the case.

Laws applied
- Age Discrimination in Employment Act of 1967

Smith v. City of Jackson, 544 U.S. 228 (2005), was a case decided by the Supreme Court of the United States on March 30, 2005. It concerned the Age Discrimination in Employment Act of 1967 (ADEA) and the disparate impact theory.

The Court held that although the theory of disparate impact set forth in Griggs v. Duke Power Co., 401 U.S. 424 (1971) is also applicable under the ADEA, the ADEA is narrower as it permits “otherwise prohibited” actions “where the differentiation is based on reasonable factors other than age.”

== Background ==
In a revised employee pay plan, the City of Jackson in Mississippi increased the salaries of all police officers and dispatchers. Employees with less than five years of service received greater raises than ones with more seniority. In this police department, most officers over the age of 40 had served for more than five years.

Azel Smith and a group of other older department employees filed suit under the ADEA, claiming disparate treatment and disparate impact. They argued that the City and police department unintentionally discriminated against them based on their age group.

== Legal history ==
The U.S. District Court for the Southern District of Mississippi granted summary judgment to the City on both claims of disparate treatment and disparate impact.

The Fifth Circuit Court of Appeals affirmed the dismissal of the disparate impact claim, ruling that disparate impact claims were not available under the ADEA. As for the disparate treatment claim, the Court of Appeals held that ruling on that claim was premature, as plaintiffs were entitled to further discovery for the intent issue.

== Result ==
In a 5–3 decision (Justice Rehnquist did not take part), the Supreme Court held that disparate impact claims are available under the ADEA, similar to such claims under Title VII of the Civil Rights Act of 1964 as set forth in Griggs v. Duke Power Co. The Court reasoned that the ADEA and Title VII contain identical language concerning unlawful discrimination. However, the ADEA is narrower and permits “otherwise prohibited” actions “where the differentiation is based on reasonable factors other than age.”

The Court further ruled that the petitioners in this case failed to set forth a valid disparate impact claim, as they did not identify any specific test or practice in the pay plan that had an adverse impact on older employees. The Court noted that the City’s explanation that the differentiation in raise proportions was based on its goal to make junior officers’ salaries more competitive in the market provided “reasonable factors other than age.”

== See also ==
- Age Discrimination in Employment Act of 1967
- Ageism
- Civil Rights Act of 1964
- Disparate impact
- List of United States Supreme Court cases, volume 544
- United States labor law
