= Mixed motive discrimination =

"Mixed motive" discrimination is a category of discrimination under Title VII of the Civil Rights Act of 1964.

Where the plaintiff has shown intentional discrimination in a mixed motive case, the defendant can still avoid liability for money damages by demonstrating by a preponderance of the evidence that the same decision would have been made even in the absence of the impermissible motivating factor. If the defendant establishes this defense, the plaintiff is then entitled only to declaratory and injunctive relief, attorney's fees, and costs. Orders of reinstatement, as well as the substitutes of back and front pay, are prohibited if a same decision defense is proven. 42 U.S.C. §2000e-5(g)(2)(B).

In the landmark case, Price Waterhouse v. Hopkins (490 U.S. 228 (1989), the Supreme Court ruled that direct evidence is not required for a plaintiff to prove that discrimination was a motivating factor in a "mixed-motive" case, i.e., a case in which an employer had both legitimate and illegitimate reasons for making an employment decision. The distinction between "mixed-motive" cases and "pretext" cases is generally determined by whether the plaintiff produces direct rather than circumstantial evidence of discrimination. If the plaintiff produces direct evidence of discrimination, this is sufficient to show that the defendant's activity was motivated at least in part by animus toward a protected class, and therefore a "mixed-motive" instruction is given. If the evidence of discrimination is only circumstantial, the appropriate framework is the McDonnell Douglas burden-shifting framework. See generally Fakete v. Aetna, Inc. (using "direct evidence" to describe "mixed-motive" cases and noting that pretext cases arise when the plaintiff presents only indirect or circumstantial evidence of discrimination).

On the proper use of mixed-motive instructions, see Matthew Scott and Russell Chapman, Much Ado About Nothing — Why Desert Palace Neither Murdered McDonnell Douglas Nor Transformed All Employment Discrimination Cases To Mixed-Motive, 36 St. Mary's L.J. 395 (2005):

Thus, a case properly analyzed under [42 U.S.C.] § 2000e-2(a) (what some commentators refer to as pretext cases) involves the plaintiff alleging an improper motive for the defendant’s conduct, while the defendant disavows that motive and professes only a non-discriminatory motive. On the other hand, a true mixed motive case under [42 U.S.C.] § 2000e-2(m) involves either a defendant who . . . admits to a partially discriminatory reason for its actions, while also claiming it would have taken the same action were it not for the illegitimate rationale or . . . [there is] otherwise credible evidence to support such a finding.

The rationale for the distinction . . . is simple. When the defendant renounces any illegal motive, it puts the plaintiff to a higher standard of proof that the challenged employment action was taken because of the plaintiff’s race/color/religion/sex/national origin. But, the plaintiff, if successful, is entitled to the full panoply of damages under § 2000e-5. . . .

At the same time, where the defendant is contrite and admits an improper motive (something no jury will take lightly), or there is evidence to support such a finding, the defendant’s liability risk is reduced to declaratory relief, attorneys’ fees and costs if the defendant proves it would have taken the same action even without considering the protected trait. The quid pro quo for this reduced financial risk is the lesser standard of liability (the challenged employment action need only be a motivating factor).

== Sources ==
- Adapted from a public domain source,
