= Title 29 of the United States Code =

U.S. federal statutes on labor

Title 29 of the United States Code is a code that outlines labor regulations in the United States.

== Code Chapters ==
Title 29 has 35 chapters:

- Chapter 1: Labor Statistics
- Chapter 2: Women's Bureau
- Chapter 2a. Children's Bureau (Transferred)
- Chapter 3. National Trade Unions (Repealed)
- Chapter 4. Vocational Rehabilitation of Persons Injured in Industry
- Chapter 4a. Employment Stabilization (Omitted or Repealed)
- Chapter 4b. Federal Employment Service
- Chapter 4c. Apprentice Labor
- Chapter 5. Labor Disputes; Mediation and Injunctive Relief
- Chapter 6. Jurisdiction of Courts in Matters Affecting Employer and Employee
- Chapter 7: Labor-Management Relations
- Chapter 8. Fair Labor Standards
- Chapter 9. Portal-To-Portal Pay
- Chapter 10. Disclosure of Welfare and Pension Plans (Repealed)
- Chapter 11. Labor-Management Reporting and Disclosure Procedure
- Chapter 12. Department of Labor
- Chapter 13. Exemplary Rehabilitation Certificates (Repealed)
- Chapter 14. Age Discrimination in Employment
- Chapter 15. Occupational Safety and Health
- Chapter 16. Vocational Rehabilitation and Other Rehabilitation Services
- Chapter 17. Comprehensive Employment and Training Programs (Repealed)
- Chapter 18. Employee Retirement Income Security Program
- Chapter 19. Job Training Partnership (Repealed, Transferred, or Omitted)
- Chapter 20. Migrant and Seasonal Agricultural Worker Protection
- Chapter 21. Helen Keller National Center for Youths and Adults Who Are Deaf-Blind
- Chapter 22. Employee Polygraph Protection
- Chapter 23. Worker Adjustment and Retraining Notification
- Chapter 24. Technology Related Assistance for Individuals With Disabilities (Repealed)
- Chapter 25. Displaced Homemakers Self-Sufficiency Assistance (Repealed)
- Chapter 26. National Center for the Workplace (Repealed)
- Chapter 27. Women in Apprenticeship and Nontraditional Occupations
- Chapter 28. Family and Medical Leave
- Chapter 29. Workers Technology Skill Development
- Chapter 30. Workforce Investment Systems
- Chapter 31. Assistive Technology For Individuals With Disabilities
