= Sine qua non =

Indispensable and essential action, condition, or ingredient

A sine qua non (/ˌsaɪni kweɪ ˈnɒn, ˌsɪni kwɑː ˈnoʊn/, Latin: [ˈsɪnɛ kʷaː ˈnoːn]) or condicio sine qua non (plural: condiciones sine quibus non) is an indispensable and essential action, condition, or ingredient. It was originally a Latin legal term for "[a condition] without which it could not be", "but for...", or "without which [there is] nothing." Also, "sine qua non causation" is the formal terminology for "but-for causation."

== Origin and spread ==
As a Latin term, it occurs in the work of Boethius and originated in Aristotelian expressions. In Classical Latin, the form uses the word condicio (from the verb condico, condicere, to agree upon), but in later Latin the phrase is also used with conditio, an error in translation as conditio means construction and not condition.

It has passed from a merely legal usage to a more general usage in many languages, including English, German, French, Italian and Spanish.

== General usage ==
US President Andrew Jackson once gave a toast on the occasion of his receiving an honorary doctorate from Harvard University, responding to his listeners, "E pluribus unum, my friends. Sine qua non."

In 1938, Jomo Kenyatta, the general secretary of the Kikuyu Central Association and who later became Kenya's first prime minister, wrote that the institution of female genital mutilation was the "condicio sine qua non of the whole teaching of tribal law, religion and morality". He was writing in the context of the missionaries' campaign against female genital mutilation to assert the importance of the rite of passage as an ethnic marker for the Kikuyu, the main ethnic group in Kenya.

The phrase appears in the 1938 book on Dahomey culture by Melville J. Herskovits. He wrote about the need to learn the native language: "This does not mean that a knowledge of a native language is a sine qua non in the study of all problems bearing on primitive cultures. By the use of interpreters and of well recognized and tested techniques, it is possible to obtain the information needed to discover, describe and understand the institutions of a people, and it is such techniques that have been employed in this study."

The term appears in the 1958 commentary on Article 59 of the Fourth Geneva Convention on the protection of civilians during wartime. In this case, the use of sine qua non refers to the assurance for relief aid to go to the civilian population and not to be diverted toward "the benefit of the Occupying Power."

== Usage in medicine ==
In medicine, the term sine qua non (in contrast with pathognomonic) is often used in regard to any sign, symptom, or finding whose absence would very likely mean absence of the target disease or condition. The test for such a sign, symptom, or finding would thereby have very high sensitivity and thus would rarely miss the condition and so a negative result should be reassuring since the disease being tested for is absent. Examples include:

- The absence of finding one of the appropriate corresponding underlying mutations excludes coeliac disease or certain types of hereditary colon cancer.
- A vaginal pH of less than 4.5 practically excludes bacterial vaginosis.
- Sine qua non was the inspiration behind a brand name of a tricyclic antidepressant manufactured in Germany: (Sinequan) doxepin.

== "But-for" causation in law ==
In legal matters, "but-for", "sine qua non", causa sine qua non, or "cause-in-fact" causation, or condicio sine qua non, is a circumstance in which a certain act is a material cause of a certain injury or wrongdoing, without which the injury would not have occurred. It is established by the "but-for" test: but for the act having occurred, the injury would not have happened.

The defendant's negligent conduct is the actual cause of the plaintiff's injury if the harm would not have occurred to the plaintiff "but for" the negligent conduct of the defendant. (Perkins)

This type of causation is often contrasted with substantial-factor causation. The substantial factor test is used when there are multiple negligent tortfeasors which either (1) all caused the injury, in which case any and all of them are 100% joint and severally liable (treated as the group but suing the money) and the charged defendant would have to implead or sue the others to square the damages, or (2) only one could have actually caused the injury but they were all negligent in the same way and that one cannot be determined, in which case the burden shifts and any of them that cannot show their negligence was not the cause is 100% joint and severally liable. The purpose of this is allow the aggrieved party to get their damages, and make the negligent tortfeasors square up amongst themselves. See e.g. Hill v. Edmonds (N.Y., 1966); Anderson v. Minneapolis, St. P. & S. St. M. Ry. Co. (Minn., 1920)

In Rogers v. Bromac Title Servs. LLC, the United States Fifth Circuit interpreted the language of the Jury System Improvement Act in prohibiting employers from terminating employees "by reason of" jury service as meaning "but-for" causation. That means that the employee must show that the termination of employment would not have occurred "but for" the jury service. That is a higher burden for the plaintiff employee than merely showing that the jury service was a motivating factor for the termination.

== See also ==
- Causation
- Four causes
- If and only if
- Latin tag
- List of Latin phrases
- Proximate cause
- Raison d'être
