= Francis Finlay =

Francis Finlay is the name of:

- Frank Finlay (1926–2016), actor
- Francis Dalzell Finlay (1793–1857), Irish journalist

== See also ==
- Frank Finlay (cricketer) (1868–1947), Irish cricketer
- Francis Finley (1882–?), rugby player
- Frank Findlay (1884–1945), New Zealand politician of the National Party
