= 1918 Birthday Honours (OBE) =

This is a list of Officer of the Order of the British Empire (OBE) awards in the 1918 Birthday Honours.

The 1918 Birthday Honours were appointments by King George V to various orders and honours to reward and highlight good works by citizens of the British Empire. The appointments were made to celebrate the official birthday of The King, and were published in The London Gazette in early June 1918.

The recipients of honours are displayed here as they were styled before their new honour, and arranged by honour, with classes (Knight, Knight Grand Cross, etc.) and then divisions (Military, Civil, etc.) as appropriate.

== Officer of the Order of the British Empire (OBE) awards ==
- Captain Arthur Cecil Abrahams — Deputy Director of Stores, Boulogne, British Red Cross Commission, France
- John Hilling Absale — Late Principal of the Securities Office, Bank of England
- Commander Albert Edward Acheson RN Divisional Naval Transport Officer, Manchester
- Ellen Marion Acton — Assistant Secretary, The Incorporated Soldiers and Sailors Help Society
- Lieutenant-Commander Frank Ezra Adcock RNVR Naval Intelligence Division, Admiralty
- Lieutenant-Colonel John Kellerman Adey — Deputy Assistant Director of Medical Services, Australian Imperial Force Depots
- Charles Morland Agnew, Wounded and Missing Enquiry Department, British Red Cross Society
- Commander Samuel Montagu Agnew RN
- James Herbert Aitken — Acting Assistant Director of Stores, Admiralty
- Major John Camille Akerman — Assistant Director of Propaganda and Housing, Department of the Controller-General for Merchant Shipbuilding, Admiralty
- Frederick Alexander — Commandant, Motor Ambulance Convoy No. 3, British Red Cross Commission, Italy
- James Allan Assistant County Director, Kent, British Red Cross Society
- Captain William McDiarmid Allardice — Inspector, Small Arms, Birmingham Area, Ministry of Munitions
- Clementina Dorothy Allen — Assistant County Director and Honorary Secretary, Gloucestershire, British Red Cross and Order of St. John of Jerusalem
- Walter Macarthur Allen — Director of Supplies, Metropolitan Special Constabulary
- Richard John Allison — Principal Architect, HM Office of Works
- Justin Charles William Alvarez ISO Censor of Turkish Correspondence, Malta
- Arthur Anderson — Commandant and Organiser of Motor Ambulance Transport, West Riding Division, British Red Cross and Order of St. John of Jerusalem
- Major Charles Henry Anderson — For services with the British Expeditionary Force in France
- Dora Anderson—Administrator, Red Cross Stores, Southampton Docks
- Eric Harper Anderson — Technical Adviser, Fish Section, Restriction of Enemy Supplies Department
- William Anderson — Chairman of the Glasgow Central Advisory Committee
- Beatrice Mary Apthorp — Commandant of the Technical Institute Auxiliary Hospital, Maidenhead
- Commander Francis Philip Armstrong RNVR Auxiliary Patrol
- Major William Herbert Arscott — For services with the British Expeditionary Force in France
- Lieutenant-Colonel Reginald Godfrey Aston — Officer in Charge of Military Camp Railways
- Charles Gurney Atha — Managing Director, The Frodingham Iron and Steel Co., Ltd.
- Georgina Jane Atkinson — Honorary Secretary, North Riding of Yorkshire County Association of Voluntary Workers
- Edward Lewis Attwood — Chief Constructor, Department of Director of Naval Construction, Admiralty
- Major Henry Joseph Francis Audus — For services with the British Expeditionary Force in France
- Captain James Waters Earnscliffe Avern — Section Director, Labour Department, Ministry of Munitions
- Captain James Carol Badger — Master, Mercantile Marine
- Kavas Jamas Badshah — Honorary Secretary, Ipswich War Savings Committee
- Duncan Bailey — Managing Director, Messrs, Charles Roberts and Co., Ltd.
- Brevet Lieutenant-Colonel John Henry Bailey — Deputy Assistant Director of Fortifications and Works, War Office
- Granville Hugh Baillie MBE Chief Technical Adviser on Dilution of Labour Ministry of Munitions
- Major Clive Latham Baillieu — For services with the British Expeditionary Force in France
- George Baker — Director, Messrs. John Baker & Co. (Rotherham), Limited
- Captain Richard Lawrence Baker — Design Department, Ministry of Munitions
- Charles John Balaam — Acting Divisional Officer for London and South-Eastern Division, Employment Department, Ministry of Labour
- Captain Walter Burton Burton-Baldry — Ministry of National Service
- Edmund Chaplin Baldwin — Honorary Secretary, Sussex County Association of Voluntary Workers
- Lucy Baldwin — Commandant and Donor, Wilden Auxiliary Hospital, Stourport
- William Valentine Ball — Civil Liabilities Commissioner for the County of Essex
- Archibald Hamilton Balme— Wool Technical Officer, War Office; Member of the Raw Wool Advisory Committee
- Lieutenant-Colonel Harry William Morrey Bamford MC South African Infantry
- Richard Banfield — Acting Chief Constable of Cornwall
- Anna Edwards Barbour— Benefactress, Hilden Convalescent Hospital for Soldiers, Belfast
- Major Robert Leatham Barclay — Inspector of Quarter Master-General's Services
- Major The Hon. Maurice Baring — Staff Officer, 2nd Class, Royal Air Force
- Thomas Cooke Barkas Acting Deputy Commissioner of Medical Services, Ministry of National Service, Northern Region
- Major Arthur John Chichester Barnard — For services with the British Expeditionary Force in France
- Katherine Weston Barnardiston — Head of Records Department, Central Prisoners' of War Committee, British Red Cross Society
- Lieutenant-Colonel Frank Purcell Barnes — For services with the British Expeditionary Force in France
- James Burden Barnes — Inspector of Medical Supplies, War Office
- Major George Barnsley — Assistant Director- of Recruiting, Sheffield
- Captain Frank Sowter Barnwell— Aeroplane Designer, The British and Colonial Aeroplane Co., Ltd.
- Geoffrey Foster Barrett — Director, The Hoffmann Manufacturing Co., Ltd.
- Lieutenant-Colonel Bernard John Wolfe-Barry — Staff Officer, 1st Class, Royal Air Force
- David Barry — General Manager, British and Irish Steam Packet Co., Ltd.
- John Bartholomew — Civil Liabilities Commissioner for Glasgow
- Emma Slice Barton — Administrator, Stapleton Auxiliary Hospital, Pontefract
- H G. Barwell — Superintendent, Eastern Telegraph Company, Malta
- Herbert Bates — Managing Director, Messrs. Hulse & Co., Ltd.
- William Bates — of the firm of Messrs. Rea, Coaling Agents
- Roland Bayley — Assistant Director of Oils and Fats, Ministry of Food and Ministry of Munitions
- Violet Marie Louise, Baroness Beaumont — Donor and Commandant, Officers' Auxiliary Hospital, Slindon House, Arundel, Sussex
- Ivy Nina Beckett
- Captain Charles Glynn Hughes Bellamy — For services with the British Expeditionary Force in France
- Colonel John William Beningfield VD Commandant, City of London Special Constabulary
- Reginald Allbon Bennett— Superintending Aliens Officer, Cardiff
- William John Benson — Section Director, Ministry of Munitions
- Major John Anstruther Berners — Voluntary work in connection with recruiting
- Major Egerton Mitford Bettington — For services with the British Expeditionary Force in France
- Robert Bilsland JP Chairman, West Suffolk War Agricultural Executive Committee
- Major Basil Binyon — Royal Air Force
- Major James Bird — Royal Air Force
- Captain James Webb Bispham — For services with the British Expeditionary Force in France
- Captain Edward Richard Blackburne — For services with the British Expeditionary Force in France
- Acting Fleet Paymaster Leonard Blackler RN Secretary to Principal Naval Transport Officer in France
- Thomas Blacklock — Chief Engineer, Mercantile Marine
- John Frank Blackshaw— Superintending Inspector, Dairy Branch, Board of Agriculture and Fisheries
- Harry Blake — Senior Partner, Messrs. Hogg and Robinson, Admiralty Shipping Agents
- Sir John George Blaker JP National Service Representative
- Herbert John George Blandford — Warship Production Superintendent, Department of Director of Warship Production, Admiralty
- Marie Lucienne Henriette Adine, Baroness de Blaquiere — Vice-president, Bath District, British Red Cross and Order of St. John of Jerusalem; Organiser, Lansdown Place Auxiliary Hospital, Bath.
- Commander James Bloomfield RNVR Auxiliary Shipbuilding Department, Admiralty
- Lieutenant-Colonel Edward Augustine Blount — For services with the British Expeditionary Force in France
- Major Bryan Seymour Moss-Blundell DSO For services with the British Expeditionary Force in France
- William Henry Boar — Accountant-General's Department, Admiralty
- William John Board — Town Clerk, Nottingham
- John Bond — Engineer, the Southport Gas Company; Inspector for Gas Section, Explosives Supply Department, Ministry of Munitions
- John Robert Bond — Assistant Director, Shipyard Labour Department, Admiralty
- Captain Erskine Booth — Assistant Director of Vegetable Supplies, Ministry of Food
- Mary Booth Booth — Staff Captain, Salvation Army.
- Walter Borrie — Managing Director, Messrs. Blair and Co., Ltd., Stockton-on-Tees
- Percy George Hamnall Boswell FGS Professor of Geology, Liverpool University; Geological Adviser to Ministry of Munitions
- Thomas Stanley Bower — Organiser and Officer in Charge, Auxiliary Hospital, Frodsham, Cheshire
- Godfrey Hale Boyce — Honorary Solicitor, Soldiers' and Sailors' Families' Association
- Robert Alexander Stewart Boyton — Inspector of Fuzes, Cartridge Cases and Complete Rounds, Canada, Ministry of Munitions
- Major William Percy Bradbury — For services with the British Expeditionary Force in France
- William Bradford JP General Financial Secretary, National Flint Glass Makers' Society of Great Britain and Ireland
- Fleet Surgeon Frank Bradshaw RN President of a Recruiting Medical Board
- Granville Eastwood Bradshaw — Messrs. Walton Motors, Limited
- Major Ernest Edward Peel Bramall — For services with the Egyptian Expeditionary Force
- Lieutenant-Colonel Robert Harvey Brand — Assistant Controller of Supplies in Directorate of Aircraft Equipment, Royal Air Force
- Lieutenant-Colonel The Hon. Maurice Vyner Baliol Brett MVO For services with the British Expeditionary Force in France
- Lieutenant-Colonel Gordon Leslie Broad MC Assistant Director of Army Signals, Home Forces
- Captain Francis Broadwood— National Service Representative
- Marie Frances Lisette, Baroness Willoughby de Broke — Vice-president, Kineton Division, British Red Cross and Order of St. John of Jerusalem; Joint Commandant — Kineton Auxiliary Hospital, Warwickshire
- Edward Geoffrey de Capell Brooke — Private Secretary to the Chief of the Imperial General Staff
- Lieutenant-Colonel Orlando Frank Brothers — British Columbia Regiment
- Alice Brown — Lady Superintendent, Young Men’s Christian Association. Hostel for Relatives of Wounded, Camiers
- Archibald Hall Brown — Deputy Controller, Gun Supply Department, Ministry of Munitions
- Lady Isabel Mary Peyronnet Browne — Wounded and Missing Enquiry Department, British Red Cross Society, London
- Lieutenant-Colonel Philip Henry Browne — Assistant Director, Inland Water Transport, Mesopotamia
- Lieutenant-Colonel Alexander Bruce — Army Medical Department, War Office
- Captain Edward Walrond de Wells Bruce — Master of the Hospital Ship Plassy.
- William Joseph Willett Bruce— Superintending Engineer, Mercantile Marine
- John Norman Brunton — Head of Merchant Tonnage Section, Director of Statistics Department, Admiralty
- Major George Herbert Bryant — For services with the British Expeditionary Force in France
- Major Edward John Buckley — For services with the British Expeditionary Force in France
- Georgiana Essie Budgett — Honorary Secretary, Bristol Branch, British Red Cross Society
- William Huntley Buist JP — Senior Magistrate of Dundee; Chairman of the Dundee War Savings Committee
- Charles Henry Bulleid — Manager at a National Shell Factory
- Captain William Henry Chambers Bullen — Principal Assistant, Controlled Establishments Division, Ministry of Munitions
- Marion Maria Bulloch — County Director, Perthshire, Scottish Branch, British Red Cross Society
- Colonel William Edward Burgess — Senior National Service Representative, Bristol
- Lieutenant-Colonel Newdigate Addington Knightley Burne — For services with the British Expeditionary Force in France
- Sarah Elizabeth Burnet — Assistant Chief of Section at the Central Office, Ministry of Labour
- William Beckit Burnie — Brighton War Pensions Committee and Brighton Technical Institute
- The Rev. Canon Harry Darwin Burton — Principal Chaplain, New Zealand Expeditionary Force
- Frank Bushrod — Assistant Superintendent of the Line, London and South-Western Railway
- Samuel Foster Butcher — Bury War Pensions Local Committee
- Albert Butler — Principal Clerk (in charge of Accounts), Royal Arsenal, Woolwich
- Harold George Butler — Chairman, Blacklist Committee, War Trade Department
- Major Jabez Butterworth — Army Pay Department
- Ethel Buxton — Joint Commandant, Theydon Towers Auxiliary Hospital, Theydon Bois, Essex
- The Hon. Mary Emma Buxton — The Lady Lugard Belgian Hospitality Committee
- Major Roland Martin Byne — Royal Marine Light Infantry
- Charles Reginald Byrom — Assistant to the Superintendent of the Line, London and North-Western Railway
- Captain Henry Leon Cabuche — Assistant Controller, Department of Engineering, Ministry of Munitions
- The Rev. David Smith Cairns Young Men’s Christian Association. — Worker in France and Great Britain
- James Charles Calder — Timber Supplies Department, Board of Trade
- Lieutenant-Colonel Michael Alexander Caldwell — For services with the British Expeditionary Force in France
- Joseph Callan — District Secretary, Young Men’s Christian Association, Rouen
- Louisa Mary Calverley — Vice-president, Harlow Division, Essex Branch, British Red Cross Society
- Acting Commander Donald Campbell RN— Port Coaling Officer
- Mary Vereker Hamilton-Campbell — Head of the Voluntary Organisations Depot, Ayr
- Lieutenant -Commander Victor Ribeiro d'Almeida Campos RNR — Master of the Cableship Colonia
- Major Charles George du Cane — For services with the British Expeditionary Force in France
- Captain Edwin Galton Cannons — Master, Mercantile Marine
- Alexander Cargill JP — Member of the Scottish War Savings Committee
- Charles Howard Carpenter — Voluntary Worker in the Department of the Director-General of Voluntary Organisations
- Alexander Carr
- Reginald Childers Culling Carr — Deputy Director of the Enforcement Branch, Ministry of Food
- Flora Mactavish Carter — Honorary Secretary, Aberdeen City Association of Voluntary Workers
- Herbert Parkinson Carter — Chairman, Lincoln (Holland Division) War Agricultural Executive Committee
- Reginald Ormsby Cary — Director and General Manager, The Sopwith Aviation Co., Ltd.
- Albert Cathles — Assistant Controller, Factory Audit and Costs, Ministry of Munitions
- Beatrice Julia Cave — Vice-president, Lawford's Gate Division, British Red Cross and Order of St. John of Jerusalem; Commandant, Cleve Hill Auxiliary Hospital, Gloucestershire
- The Hon. Elizabeth Janet Cavendish — Vice-president, North Huntingdonshire, British Red Cross and Order of St. John of Jerusalem; Commandant and Administrator, Whitehall Auxiliary Hospital, Sawtry, Huntingdonshire
- Harold Richards Chaldecott — Manager, Elswick Shipbuilding Yard, Newcastle
- Helen Chamberlain — Assistant County Director, Birmingham, British Red Cross and Order of St. John of Jerusalem
- Frank William Chambers — County Secretary for War Savings in Gloucestershire
- Lieutenant-Colonel John Adrian Chamier DSO Officer Commanding, School of Instruction, Royal Air Force
- Lieutenant-Colonel Reginald Spencer Chaplin — British Remount Commission, Canada
- Captain Edward Henry Chapman — For services with the British Expeditionary Force in France
- Rowland Hugh Charlton — Chairman and managing director, Messrs. Charlton & Co., Engineers, Grimsby
- Elinor Mary Charrington — Vice-president, Burton Division, British Red Cross and Order of St. John of Jerusalem; Commandant, Burton Auxiliary Hospital, Staffordshire
- Major William Charles Chassar — Australian Imperial Forces
- Eva Christine Cheetham — Commandant, Cawston Manor Auxiliary Hospital, Norwich
- Captain Henry Francis Chettle — Registrar, Graves Registration and Enquiries
- Edwin Albert Chill Assistant County Director, Central Division, Middlesex, British Red Cross and Order of St. John of Jerusalem
- Robert Francis Cholmeley — Joint Honorary Secretary of the Incorporated Association of Headmasters
- Lieutenant-Colonel Mervyn Lyde Chute — For services with the British Expeditionary Force in France
- Major Douglas Clapham — Inspector, Proof Officer, U.S.A., Ministry of Munitions
- Captain Frank Henry Claret — Master, Mercantile Marine
- Captain Frederick Ourry Clark — Master, Mercantile Marine
- Colonel John de Winton Lardner-Clarke — First Assistant to the chief executive officer of the Cable Censorship
- Major Ernest Charles Clay — Deputy Assistant Adjutant-General, War Office
- Major William Henry Christy Clay — Deputy Chief Valuer and Compensation Officer, War Office
- Ella Elizabeth Clipperton — Directress of British Red Cross Stores Rouen
- Mary Knight Clowes — Organiser, Young Women's Christian Association. Munition Canteens
- Major Thomas Seymour Coates — For services with the British Expeditionary Force in France
- Lieutenant-Colonel Henry Frederick Cobb — Chief Valuer and Compensation Officer, Lands Division, War Office and Ministry ol Munitions
- Major David Cockburn TD Secretary, Territorial Force Association of the County of Dumbarton
- Major Ernest Radcliffe Cockburn — Secretary to the Territorial Force Association of the County of Ayr
- Major George Ernest Cockburn — Assistant Director of Engineering Work, Department of the Controller-General for Merchant Shipbuilding, Admiralty
- Major Anthony Stuart Buckland-Cockell MC For services with the British Expeditionary Force in France
- Major Basil Elmsley Coke — For services with the British Expeditionary Force in France
- Colonel George Henry Coleman VD County Secretary, Essex Branch, British Red Cross Society
- Captain Patrick Eugene Coleman — For services with the British Expeditionary Force in France
- Charles Benjamin Collett — Locomotive Works Manager, Great Northern Railway
- Colonel Henry Concannon TD Director, White Star Line
- Captain Raymond Henry Coope — Master, Mercantile Marine
- Major Vivian Bolton Douglas Cooper — For services with the British Expeditionary Force in France
- William Alexander Coote — Secretary, National Vigilance Association
- Sybel Corbett — Deputy President, Caerphilly Division, British Red Cross and Order of St. John of Jerusalem; Commandant, Auxiliary Hospital, Caerphilly
- William Delhi Cornish JP Voluntary work in connection with recruiting
- James Cosgrove — Chief Engineer, Mercantile Marine
- Mabel Cotterell — Chief Lady Welfare Supervisor at one of HM Factories, Ministry of Munitions
- Major Frederick Coulon — For services with the British Expeditionary Force, in France
- John Charles Couper — Chief National Service Representative, Edinburgh
- Alfred Cox Secretary, Central Medical War Committee
- Irene Winifred Cox — General Secretary, Young Women's Christian Association
- Richard Andrew Crafter — Harbour Master, Mersey Docks and Harbour Board, Liverpool
- Eustace Neville Craig — Voluntary services in connection with recruiting
- William Craig — County Clerk of Dumbartonshire; Clerk to the Local Tribunal
- John Crisp — Divisional Commander, Metropolitan Special Constabulary
- George Crammond Croal — Chief Engineer, Mercantile Marine
- Major Crofton Croker — For services with the British Expeditionary Force in France
- William Montgomery Crook — Collections Department, Joint War Committee, British Red Cross and Order of St John of Jerusalem
- Captain Alwyn Douglas Crow — Research Department, Woolwich
- Edith Frances Crowdy — Deputy Director; Women's Royal Naval Service
- Isabel Crowdy — Commandant of Voluntary Aid Detachment Area, British-Red Cross Commission, France
- William John Cruddas — Section Director, Aircraft Production-Department, Ministry of Munitions
- Alexander Thomas Cruickshank — Chairman of the Aberdeen Central War Savings Committee
- Edith Bruce Culver — Divisional Secretary, British Red Cross-Society, Kent
- Alexander Charles Cumming Director, The Lothian Chemical Co., Ltd.; Manager at one of HM Factories, Ministry of Munitions
- Barbara Martin Cunningham Military Hospital, Mtarfa, Malta
- James William Curry — Deputy Controller of Supplies, HM Office of Works
- Major Sydney Herbert George Dainton — Assistant Director, Postal Services, British Expeditionary Force, France.
- Major Alwyn Percy Dale — For an act of gallantry not in the presence of the enemy
- Lieutenant-Colonel James William Ogilvy-Dalgleish — Assistant in the Directorate of Air Personal Services, Air Ministry
- Lieutenant-Colonel Joseph Dalrymple — For services with the British Expeditionary Force in France
- Norman Pearson Dalziel — Assistant to Chief Inspector of Munitions, Canada, Ministry of Munitions
- Colonel Thomas Edward St. Clare Daniell MC Deputy Director of Aircraft Equipment, Royal Air Force
- Major William Hastings la Touche Darley — For services with the British Expeditionary Force in France
- Colonel Edward Humphrey Davidson MC Deputy Director of Air Intelligence, Royal Air Force
- Lieutenant-Colonel Charles Robert Davies — Permanent President of Courts-Martial, Australian Imperial Force
- Ethel Price-Davies — Vice-president, County of Montgomery Branch, British Red Cross Society
- Richard Davies JP Chairman, Executive Committee, City of London Branch, British Red Cross Society
- Thomas Evan Davies — Section Director, Railway Materials Department, Ministry of Munitions
- Captain William Henry Saxon Davies — Deputy Director, Motor Transport, Boulogne, British Red Cross Commission, France
- Lieutenant Sidney George Davis — Registration Department, Ministry of National Service
- Lilla Davy — Area Controller, Queen Mary's Army Auxiliary Corps
- Sybil Mary Dawnay — Honorary Secretary, Northamptonshire County Association of Voluntary Workers
- Arthur James Dawson — Clerk to the County of Durham Education Committee
- Minnie Ethel, Lady Dawson — Yarrow Military Hospital, Broadstairs
- Major Edmund Day — Embarkation Veterinary Officer, Southampton
- Norris Henry Deakin — Secretary, Sheffield Employers' Federation
- Augusta Deane — Senior Organising Officer for Women's Work, South-Western Division, Ministry of Labour
- Major William Delany — For services with the British Expeditionary Force in France
- Arthur Christopher Denham — Section Director. Priority Department, Ministry of Munitions
- Lieutenant-Colonel Bertram Ramsey Dennis For services with the British Expeditionary Force in France
- Beatrice Lorne Despard — Honorary Superintendent and Convener of the County of Lanarkshire War Work Association; Commandant, Caldegrove Auxiliary Hospital
- Edward Dexter — Honorary Secretary, City of London War Savings Committee
- Thomas Edward Dexter — Expense Accounts Officer, Devonport Dockyard
- Isabel Anne Dickson — HM Inspector of Schools; Food Production Department, Board of Agriculture
- Norman Dickson — Member of the Priority Committee, Ministry of Munitions
- Arthur Diggins — Senior Clerk, Exchequer and Audit Department
- Edmund Grattan Dignam — Commission Internationale de Ravitaillement
- Lieutenant-Colonel John Francis Dimmer — Royal Marine Light Infantry
- Beatrice, Dowager Lady Dimsdale — Commandant, Fishmongers' Hall Auxiliary Hospital for Officers
- Edward Dixon — Messrs. Firth & Son, Ltd., Sheffield
- Leonard Alexander Dixon — General Secretary, Young Men’s Christian Association, Mesopotamian Expeditionary Force
- Thomas Liddell Dodds JP Chairman, Birkenhead Local Tribunal
- Sir Matthew Blayney Smith-Dodsworth Bt Chairman of the Yorkshire Division, Young Men’s Christian Association.
- Robinson Irving Dodsworth — Head of Steamship Management Department, Messrs. Furness, Withy & Co. (London)
- Captain Herbert Edward Dolton — Master, Mercantile Marine
- Bedford Lockwood Dorman — Directorate of Artillery, War Office
- Alfred Douglas — Accountant-General's Department, Admiralty
- Captain James Bernard Harvey Doyle — For services with the British Expeditionary Force in France
- Katharine Rosebery Drinkwater In charge of Military Families' Hospital Staff and department, Malta
- Reginald Ernest Druitt — Greek Shipping Committee
- Captain Robert Drummond JP Chairman of Paisley Local Tribunal
- Geoffrey Herbert Drury — Mobilisation Directorate, War Office
- Major John Douglas Drysdale — For services with the British Expeditionary Force in France
- Maud Violet Dugdale — Commandant, Yarm Auxiliary Hospital, Yorkshire
- James Duncan — National Service Representative, Brechin District, Forfarshire
- Major Charles Dunlop — For service in Russia
- The Rev. George Victor Dunnett — Temporary Chaplain to the Forces, 4th Class
- Captain Percy Dunsheath — For services with the British Expeditionary Force in France
- Philip Barton Durnford — Secretary, Expeditionary Force Canteens
- Frank George Edmed — Principal Assistant Chemist, Inspection Department, Ministry of Munitions
- John Edwards — Manager, Messrs. Hick, Hargreaves & Co., Ltd.
- Major William Bickerton Edwards Commissioner for Medical Services for Ministry of National Service, Welsh Region
- William Rea Edwards — Headquarters Secretary, Order of St. John of Jerusalem
- George Egan — Cashier, HM Dockyard, Portsmouth
- Frank Minshull Elgood — Church Army Commissioner for an Army Area in France; Chairman of the Military Standing Committee, Church Army
- Colonel Arthur Warre Elles — For services in connection with recruiting
- Samuel Ellicock — HM Inspector of Schools; Honorary Secretary, Leicestershire War Savings Committee
- James Valentine Ellis — Commercial and General Manager, The Workington Iron and Steel Co., Ltd.
- Elisha Elwood— Superintending Inspector of Taxes, Inland Revenue Department
- Frederick William Emett — Director, Intelligence Bureau, Reuter's
- Lawrence Ennis — General Manager, Messrs. Dorman, Long & Co., Ltd.
- Captain Henry Morton Glyn Evans — Sub-Commissioner for Trade Exemptions, Ministry of National Service, Welsh Region
- Herbert Walter Lloyd Evans — Assistant Superintendent, Operative Department, Royal Mint
- Richard Evans — Chairman, Cardiganshire War Agricultural Executive Committee
- Gwendolen Evelyn Maud Evelyn — Commandant, No. 6 Auxiliary Hospital, Radnor
- Captain Ernest Andrew Ewart — Propaganda Branch, Aircraft Production Department, Ministry of Munitions
- John Eyre — Honorary Secretary, Buckinghamshire Branch, British Red Cross Society
- Oscar Faber Messrs. Trollope & Colls,
- William Fairbank MVO MRCS LRCP Organiser and Instructor in Ambulance Work in the Windsor District, British Red Cross and Order of St. John of Jerusalem
- Samuel William Farmer JP Member of the President of the Board of Agriculture's Advisory Committee on Food Production
- Alfred William Farnsworth — Secretary and General Manager, Derbyshire Munitions Board of Management
- Thomas Fender — Works Superintendent, Messrs. Vickers, Ltd., Barrow
- William Henry Ffiske — Managing Director, Messrs. Boulton and Paul, Limited
- Herbert Stanley Field — Chief Dilution Officer, Yorkshire and East Midlands Division, Ministry of Munitions
- Joseph Henry Field — Town Clerk, Huddersfield
- The Hon. Florence Agnes, Lady Fiennes — Commandant and Donor, Studland Bay Hospital for Officers, Dorsetshire
- Lieutenant-Commander William Finch RNR Master, Mercantile Marine
- Lieutenant-Colonel Frank Dalzell Finlay — For services, with the British Expeditionary Force in France
- Captain Duncan Finlayson — Chief Constable of the County of Ross and Cromarty
- Arthur Percy Morris Fleming — Engineer, British Westinghouse Company; Honorary Secretary, Lancashire Anti-Submarine Committee
- Lieutenant-Colonel John Grant Fleming VD National Service Representative, Banffshire
- Frank Purser Fletcher — Electrical Engineer, Department of Director of Electrical Engineering, Admiralty
- John Smith Flett FRS Assistant to the Director of the Geological Survey of Great Britain
- Leila Beatrice Flower — Clerk in the Prime Minister's Secretariat
- Allen Edward Ford — Section Director, Aircraft Finance Department, Ministry of Munitions
- Major Edward Thomas Forsdick — For services with the British Expeditionary Force in France
- George Frederick Forsdike — Chairman, Cardiff Local Tribunal
- Lieutenant-Commander John Vernon Forster RNR Marine Superintendent, Canadian Pacific Ocean Services, Limited
- Major John Vere Foster — For services with the British Expeditionary Force, Salonika
- Captain Ralph Howard Fowler — Munitions Inventions Department
- Robert Copp Fowler — Casualty Section, War Office
- Herbert William Sidney Francis — First Class Clerk, Local Government Board
- George Ernest Franey — Personal Secretary to the Secretary of State for India during his tour in India
- Captain Francis Arthur Freeth — Chemist, Messrs. Brunner Mond and Co., Ltd.
- Guy Carey Fricker — Managing Director, Fricker's Metal Co., Ltd.
- Beatrice Fry — The Training Ship Mercury
- Theodore Wilfrid Fry — Civil Liabilities Commissioner for the County of Durham
- Mabel Fuller — Commandant, Auxiliary Hospital, Melksham, Wiltshire
- Commander Gerard Knipe Gandy RNR RD Master, Mercantile Marine
- Major Henry George Gandy DSO Brigade Major and Secretary, School of Military Engineering
- Robert Dowell Ganson JP Convener of the County of Shetland; Member of the Appeal Tribunal of the Sheriffdom
- Commander Peter Bruff Garrett RN Divisional Naval Transport Officer, Newhaven
- Holbrook Gaskell — Chief Engineer, the United Alkali Company, Ltd.
- Captain Thomas Frank Gates — Commodore Master, Mercantile Marine
- Captain Vernon Rodney Montagu Gattie — Prisoners of War Directorate, War Office
- Lina Mary Scott Gatty — Honorary Secretary, Huntingdonshire County Association of Voluntary Workers
- Walter Henry Gaunt — Domestic Distribution Branch, Coal Mines Department, Board of Trade
- Captain John George — Master, Mercantile Marine
- Herbert Mends Gibson MBE Chief Superintendent, Manchester Ship Canal Company
- Captain Richard Edward Gibson — For services with the British Expeditionary Force in France
- John MacAuslan Gilchrist — Manager, Repairing Works, Messrs. Barclay Curie-and Co., Ltd., Whiteinch
- Charles John Gladwell — Late Head of the Commercial Section, War Trade Intelligence Department
- Herbert Glaser — Section Director, Aircraft Production Department, Ministry of Munitions
- Lieutenant-Colonel Thomas George Powell Glynn CMG For services with the British Expeditionary Force in France
- Francis Edward Gobey — Wagon and Carriage Superintendent, Lancashire and Yorkshire Railway
- Major Charles Ernest Goddard President of a Recruiting Medical Board
- Lieutenant-Colonel John Charles Lerrier Godfray MC For services with the British Expeditionary Force in France
- Lieutenant-Colonel Harcourt Gilbey Gold — Staff Officer, 1st Class, Royal Air Force
- James Scott Gordon — Deputy Assistant Secretary and Chief Inspector, Department of Agriculture and Technical Instruction for Ireland
- James Tennant Gordon — Chief Constable of Fifeshire
- Captain Ronald Gorell, Baron Gorell MC For services with the British Expeditionary Force in France
- Major William Henry Neville Goschen— National Service Representative
- Violet Alice Gott — Vice-president, Alton Division, British Red Cross and Order of St. John of Jerusalem, and Commandant, Alton Auxiliary Hospital, Hampshire
- Thomas Harkness Graham — Secretary, Scottish Medical War Emergency Committee
- Captain Dennis Granville MVO Chief Constable of Dorset
- Edward Douglas Grasett — Outdoor Traffic Superintendent, North Staffordshire Railway
- Major Frederick Grassick — Australian Army Pay Corps
- Major Cecil Alexander Hope Graves — For services with the British Expeditionary Force in France
- James Carter Gray — Personal Assistant to' Council Member "M," Ministry of Munitions'
- Ethel Mary Green — Vice-president and Commandant, Nunthorpe Hall Auxiliary Hospital, York
- Major John Green — For services with the British Expeditionary Force in France
- John Little Green — Secretary of the Rural League
- Major Charles Okey Greenwell — For services with the British Expeditionary Force in France
- Captain Alured Ussher Greer — Assistant Controller, Salvage Department, Ministry of Munitions
- Lieutenant-Colonel Alfred Gregory — Senior Technical Examiner of Works Services, War Office
- Lieutenant-Commander Nigel de Grey RNVR Naval Intelligence Division, Admiralty
- Lady Sybil Grey — Commandant, Dorchester House Hospital for Officers; late Commandant of Anglo-Russian Hospital, Petrograd
- Major Richard Albany Grieve — For services with the British Expeditionary Force in France
- Lieutenant-Colonel William Ernest Grigor — Australian Army Medical Corps
- Lieutenant-Colonel Basil Jasper Gripper VD Secretary, Territorial Force Association of the County of Hertford
- Frank Grove — Inspector of Munitions Areas, Manchester, Ministry of Munitions
- Samuel Percy Grundy — General Secretary, Manchester City League of Help; Honorary Secretary, Manchester War Savings Committee
- Charles John Tench Bedford Grylls MBE Committee Clerk, Board of Customs and Excise
- Sir William Cameron Gull Bt National Service Representative
- Lieutenant-Colonel John Alexander Gunn — For services with the British Expeditionary Force in France
- Engineer Commander Arthur Sydney Gush RN
- Edith Moore-Gwyn — Commandant, "The Laurels" Auxiliary Hospital, Neath
- John Thomas Augustus Haines — Postal Censor's Department
- William Joseph Haines — Lieutenant-Colonel, Salvation Army
- Annie Hall — Commandant, Eastcote Auxiliary Hospital, Middlesex
- Charles John Ernest Hall — Assistant County Director, Auxiliary Hospitals and Voluntary Aid Detachments, Cheshire
- Frederick Walter Hall — Chairman, Survey Committee, Yorkshire (North Riding) War Agricultural Executive Committee
- Major Herbert Gordon Lewis Hall — For services with the British Expeditionary Force in France
- Martin Julian Hall — Late Section Director, Gun Statistics Department, Ministry of Munitions
- Frederic Greville Hallett — Secretary, Committee of Reference, Ministry of National Service
- Captain John Molyneux Hamill — For services with the British Expeditionary Force in France
- Charles Gipps Hamilton — Member of Bacon Board, Ministry of Food
- Effield Dorothy Cecil Hanbury — Vice-president, Hospital Supply Depot, British Red Cross Society, Dorchester
- Captain Charles Frederick Hancock — Master, Mercantile Marine
- Harry George Handover JP Mayor of Paddington
- William Joseph Hands — Acting Deputy Director-General of National Labour Supply
- John Miller-Hannah JP Chairman of the Ayrshire Food Production Committee; Member of the Ayrshire Appeal Tribunal
- Major John Richard Hanson — Army Pay Department
- Lieutenant-Colonel Paul Rennard Hanson — Officer in charge of Canadian Discharge Depot, Buxton
- Staff Surgeon Reginald John Edward Hanson RNVR
- Egerton Stephen Somers Harding — Founder and Manager of the Catholic Club, France
- Major William Frederick James Hardisty — Secretary, Territorial Force Association of the County of Warwick
- Frances May Holford Hardman — Commandant, Castle Auxiliary Hospital, Sherborne
- Edward Harker — His Britannic Majesty's Consul, Valencia
- David Harley — Provost of the Burgh of Dunfermline
- Captain Arthur David Harper — Assistant Secretary, Ministry of National Service, North-Western Region
- John Bradford Harper — Assistant General Superintendent, North Eastern Railway
- Herbert Frederick Harries — Late Acting Chief Constable, Shrewsbury Borough Police
- Lieutenant-Commander George Henry Harris RNR Master, Mercantile Marine
- George Montagu Harris — Acting Clerk to the East Sussex County Council
- Brevet Colonel Gerald Noel Anstice Harris — Royal Military Academy
- William Harrison — Chairman, Manufacturers' (Agricultural Machinery-Implements) Advisory Committee, Ministry of Munitions; Director, Messrs. Harrison Macgregor and Co., Ltd.
- Lieutenant-Colonel William Edward Harrison — Second in Command of an Engineering Training Centre
- John Edwin Harston — HM Deputy Superintending Inspector of Factories
- Lieutenant-Colonel John Brunton Harstone — For an act of gallantry not in the presence of the enemy
- Lieutenant-Colonel Harold Hartley MC For services with the British Expeditionary Force in France
- Harry Hartley — Technical Wool Officer, War Office
- William Hartree — Munitions Inventions Department
- Major Stuart Hartshorn — Secretary, Ministry of National Service, East Midlands Region
- Captain Geoffrey de Havilland — Aeroplane Designer, the Aeroplane Manufacturing Company
- Algernon Richard Francis Hay — Parliamentary Department, Foreign Office
- James Lawrence Hay MBE Secretary in charge of Young Men’s Christian Association. For work with New Zealand troops in France.
- George Tolman Haycraft — Secretary, Indian Liner Conference, Ministry of Shipping
- George Patrick Hayes— Superintending Civil Engineer, HM Dockyard, Devonport
- Ernest Addison Stanley Hayward — Acting Assistant Director of Stores, Admiralty; late Naval Store Officer, Malta
- Captain Geoffrey Head — Secretarial Officer, Ministry of Munitions
- Major Samuel Rigbye Heakes — For services, with the British Expeditionary Force in France
- Captain Albert Edward Heasman — Chief Ordering and Forwarding Officer, Expeditionary Force Canteens
- Meyrick William Heath — Honorary Accountant, West of England Munitions Board of Management
- William Robertson Heatley — His Britannic Majesty's Consul, Odense
- Margaret Elizabeth Heaton — Commandant, Harborne Hall Auxiliary Hospital, Harborne, Birmingham
- Ethel Marian Hedderwick — Convener of Red Cross Samaritan Committee and Organiser of Ladies' Committees visiting patients in Glasgow Area, Scottish Branch, British Red Cross Society
- George Reginald Helmore — Assistant Director of National Service, South London and District Area
- Captain Kenneth George Henderson — Member of the British War Mission to the United States of America
- Rosalie Margaret Herbert — Commandant, Fairlawn Auxiliary Hospital, Honor Oak Road, Forest Hill
- Roger Gaskell Hetherington — Secretary of the Works Construction Sub-Committee, War Priorities Committee
- Lieutenant-Colonel Francis Esme Theodore Hewlett — Royal Air Force and Directorate of Aircraft Production
- Major Edward Weston Hickes — For services with the British Expeditionary Force in France
- Acting Commander William Thomas Hicks RN
- Dorothy Eleanor Augusta Hignett — Deputy Directress, Central Irish War Hospital Supply Depot, Irish Branch, British Red Cross Society
- Lieutenant-Colonel Charles Henry Hill — Officer Commanding a Transport Workers' Battalion
- Captain George Bernard Hill — For services with the British Expeditionary Force in France
- Major Henry Leonard Gauntlett Hill — Mobilization Directorate, War Office
- Thomas Eustace Hill Medical Officer of Health, County of Durham
- Major Edward Langdale Hilleary — For services with British Expeditionary-Force, Salonika
- Captain Arthur Mayger Hind — For services with the British Expeditionary Force in France
- Frederick George Hinks — Principal Clerk, Ministry of Pensions
- Commander Richard John Bayntun Hippisley RNVR DL TD Naval Intelligence Division, Admiralty
- Frank Hird — Assistant Chief Commissioner for France, Church Army
- Arthur John Hodgson — Inspector of Small Arms Ammunition, Ministry of Munitions
- Joseph Willoughby Hodgson VD Commandant and Medical Officer in Charge, Exmouth Auxiliary Hospital, Devonshire
- Captain Patrick Kirkman Hodgson — For services with the British Expeditionary Force in France
- William Hogarth — Superintendent, HM Victualling Yard, Malta; Member of the Wheat Board, Malta
- Major Robert Henry Hogg — Officer in charge of New Zealand Officers' Hospital, Brockenhurst
- John Edward Holden — County Secretary for War Savings, Devonshire
- Major Lionel Brook Holliday — Chairman, Messrs. L.B. Holliday & Co.; Manager at one of HM Factories, Ministry of Munitions
- Dora Emily Susan, Lady Hollins — President of St. John Voluntary Aid Detachment Hospital, Preston
- Henry Nicholls Holmes, District Secretary for Young Men’s Christian Association, France
- Captain Horace Gordon Holmes — Sub-Commissioner and Accountant, British Red Cross Society, Mesopotamia
- Colonel Robert Blake Worsley Holmes — Chief Mechanical Engineer, Inland Waterways and Docks, Richborough
- Thomas Herbert Holt — Head of Shipping Department, Office of the Crown Agents for the Colonies
- Major George Home — Officer in charge of Surgical Division, No. 2 New Zealand General Hospital
- Annie Violet Honey — Divisional superintendent, Soldiers Award Branch, Ministry of Pensions
- Major Alexander Francis Anderson Hooper — For services with the British Expeditionary Force in France
- Captain Wallis Dawson Hooper — For services with the British Expeditionary Force in France
- Edward William Hope Medical Officer of Health, Liverpool
- The Rev. Charles Plomer Hopkins — Honorary Treasurer of the Sailors' and Firemen's Union
- John William Home — Joint Honorary Organiser, War Savings, West Riding of Yorkshire
- Mabella Harriette Georgina Hoskyns — Vice-president, Chard District, British Red Cross Society, Somersetshire
- Major Henry Ralph Mowbray Howard — Assistant Inspector of Physical and Bayonet Training
- Felix William Hudlass, Consulting Engineer to Motor Ambulance Department, British Red Cross Society Headquarters, London
- Francis Josiah Hudleston — Librarian, General Staff Library, War Office
- Fanny Marian Hudson — Donor and Administrator, Brabyns Sail Auxiliary Hospital, Marple, Cheshire
- Hilda Phoebe Hudson Aero-Dynamics Technical Research, Aircraft Production Department, Ministry of Munitions
- Phyllis May, Lady Hughes — Commandant, Munitions Canteen at a National Shell Factory
- William Arthur Hyde Hulton — Director, Russo-British Shipping Co., Ltd.
- John Goundrill Humphrys — Domestic Distribution Branch, Coal Mines Department, Board of Trade
- Sylvia Hunloke — Stores Department — Headquarters Staff, British Red Cross Society
- Jesse Brookes Hunt— Superintending Civil Engineer, HM Dockyard, Portsmouth
- Alexander Hunter Chief Medical Officer, Earl's Court Belgian Refugees Camp
- Henry Norton Hutchinson — Section Director, Department of Area Organisation, Ministry of Munitions
- Captain Walter Ernest Hutchinson RNR Marine Superintendent, British India Steam Navigation Co., Ltd.
- Joyce Violet Ilbert — Collections Department Joint War Committee, British Red Cross and Order of St. John of Jerusalem
- Hugh Inglis — Assistant to the Locomotive Superintendent, North British Railway
- John Iron — Commercial Harbour Master, Dover
- Lieutenant-Colonel Lewis Allen Irving — Manager of the War Refugees Committee's Hostels
- Captain Fullarton James — Chief Constable of Northumberland
- Robert Percival James — Acting Accountant, National Health Insurance Commission (England)
- Wilhelmina Martha James — Head of Red Cross Canteens, Salonika
- William John James — Postmaster of Southampton
- George Ernest Jeffes— Legal Adviser, Egyptian Expeditionary Force
- Henry Archibald Jenkin — County Secretary for War Savings, Worcestershire, Shropshire, and Herefordshire
- Major George Gaston Jessiman — Deputy Assistant Director of Supplies. War Office
- Arthur Johnson — Secretary, Trading Department, Young Men’s Christian Association, Egypt
- Robert Stewart Johnson — Managing Director, Messrs. Workman, Clarke and Co., Ltd., Belfast
- Major Arthur Hammersley Johnston MRCS LRCP Assistant County Director, British Red Cross Society, East Riding of Yorkshire
- Joseph Johnstone JP Member of the Scottish War Aims Committee
- Josephine Johnstone — Commandant, Bignor Park Auxiliary Hospital, Pulborough, Sussex
- Aneurin Jones — Secretary, Priority Department, Ministry of Munitions
- Lieutenant-Colonel Charles Hugh le Pailleur Jones — For services with the British Expeditionary Force in France
- Lieutenant David Gwilym Jones RNVR JP President of Fishery Advisory Committee, Milford Haven
- Ethel Mary Jones — Commandant, Budworth Hall Auxiliary Hospital, Ongar, Essex
- Lieutenant Glyn Howard Howard-Jones — Ministry of National Service
- Richard Evan Jones JP County Director, Auxiliary Hospitals and Voluntary Aid Detachments, Cardiganshire
- Tom Bruce Jones — President of the Home Grown Timber Merchants' Association of Scotland; Member of the Home Grown Timber Advisory Committee
- Captain William Jones — For services with the British Expeditionary Force in France
- Captain Ernest Martin Joseph — Principal Architect and Surveyor to the Navy and Army Canteen Board
- Lieutenant-Colonel John Josselyn DSO For an act of gallantry not in the presence of the enemy
- Sydney Cooper Joy — London District Manager, Wheat Commission
- Thomas Langley Judd — Assistant Controller, Munitions Accounts, Ministry of Munitions
- Frederick Kahl — Assistant Director, Brewing Branch, Ministry of Food
- Lieutenant-Colonel Richard Henry Keane — Officer Commanding a Transport Workers' Battalion
- George Keary — Divisional Superintendent, Great Eastern' Railway
- Captain John Limrick Keene — Master, Mercantile Marine
- Lieutenant-Colonel Thomas Mann Keene TD Secretary, Territorial Force Associations of the Counties of Denbigh and Flint
- Captain Angus Keith — Master, Mercantile Marine
- Hilda Margaret Catherine Kelly — Secretary, Officers' Families' Fund
- William Henry Kendall — Chief Clerk to the Commissioner of Police of the Metropolis
- Captain James Montagu Bowie Kennedy — Staff Captain, War Office
- Chris Shotter Kent — Member of the British War Mission to the United States of America
- Allen Coulter Kerr — Foreign Trade Department.
- Abraham Kershaw — Chairman and Honorary Director, Messrs. A. Kershaw & Son, Limited
- Edward Bertram Hilton Kershaw — County Director, Auxiliary Hospitals and Voluntary Aid Detachments, Merionethshire
- Commander Frederick William Kershaw RNR Harbour Master, Gravesend
- John Kinahan — Representative in France of the Soldiers' Christian Association
- James Scott Kincaid — Managing Director of Messrs. Kincaid & Co., Greenock
- Major Guy Kindersley — For services with the British Expeditionary Force in France
- The Rev. Thomas Joseph King — Senior Roman Catholic Chaplain, Australian Imperial Force
- George Henry Kingston — Assistant Director of Army Contracts
- Sir George, Kinloch Bt Appeal National Service Representative, Perthshire
- Lieutenant-Colonel John Charters Kirk — Anti-Aircraft Defences, Home Forces
- Norah Kirk — Commandant, Hallgarth Auxiliary Hospital, Pickering, Yorkshire
- Engineer Commander Joseph John Kirwin RN Engineer Inspector, Engineer-in-Chief's Department, Admiralty
- Temporary (Acting) Engineer Lieutenant-Commander Robert G. Knox RN Superintending Officer, Syra Dockyard
- Edith Mary Graves-Knyfton — Vice-president, Weston-super-Mare District, Somersetshire Branch, British Red Cross Society
- Major Solomon James Lacey — Royal Air Force, Barrack-master, Seaplane Station
- Hugh Laing — Director, Sir James Laing & Co., Ltd., Deptford Yard, Sunderland
- Andrew Lamb — Assistant to the Superintendent of the Line, Great Northern Railway
- Major Malcolm Henry Mortimer Lamb MC For services with the British Expeditionary Force in France
- Francis Lawrence Lane — Managing Director, The Leeds Forge Co., Ltd.
- William Langridge — Partner, Messrs. Gray, Dawes & Co.
- Chief Engineer Claude Charles Lapsley RNR Chief Engineer, Mercantile Marine
- Lieutenant-Colonel Edmund Larken — For services with the British Expeditionary Force in France
- Emily Anne, Lady Crooke-Lawless — Honorary Superintendent, Industries and Workshops Department, Netley Hospitals
- Captain John Henry Lawrence — For services with the British Expeditionary Force in France
- Major Francis Bernard Lawson — District Recruiting Officer, Hounslow
- Frank Warburton Lawton— Legal Assistant, Treasury Solicitor's Department, Law Courts' Branch
- Acting Commander Henry Layland RNR Commander of Dockyard, Dover
- Captain George Edward Lea — Master, Mercantile Marine
- Richard Leach, Labour Statistics Department, Ministry of Labour
- Frederick Osborne Simeon Leake — Chairman, Messrs. A. V. Roe & Co., Ltd.
- Joan Vera Douglas Learoyd — Assistant Controller, Queen Mary's Army Auxiliary Corps
- Reginald Armitage Ledgard — Director of Accounts, Ministry of National Service
- Major William Lauriston Melville Lee — Secretary to the Oxfordshire Territorial Force Association
- Ebenezer Antony Lees — Chairman, Executive Committee, Prisoners of War, British Red Cross Society, Birmingham
- Vernon Francis Leese — Deputy Surveyor of the New Forest, Office of Woods
- William Chambers Leete — Town Clerk, Kensington
- Captain Frederick Charles Lefevre — Secretary and Organiser of Motor Service, British Red Cross Commission, Malta
- Ernest John Hutchings Lemon — Carriage and Wagon Works Manager, Midland Railway
- Harry Lench JP Partner, Messrs. T. W. Lench, Limited
- Lieutenant Charles Bertram Lenthall RNVR
- Captain Joseph Leon — For services with the British Expeditionary Force in France
- Chief Engineer Robert Leslie RNR Superintending Engineer, Mercantile Marine
- John Bingley Garland Lester — Section Director, Allied Section, Requirements and Statistics Department, Ministry of Munitions
- Major Tom Lethaby — Deputy Assistant Director of Equipment and Ordnance Stores, War Office
- Captain Thomas Henry Carlton Levick — Director, Messrs. Harris & Dixon, Ltd., Steamship Owners
- Major Arthur John Lewer — Deputy Controller of Registration, Ministry of National Service, Northern Region
- Lieutenant-Colonel Arthur Francis Owen Lewis DSO For services with the British Expeditionary Force in France
- John Bebrouth Lincoln Assistant Secretary, Central Control Board (Liquor Traffic)
- William Burns Lindley — Chief Constable of Leeds City Police
- Lieutenant-Colonel Henry Edith Arthur Lindsay — Staff Officer, 1st Class, Royal Air Force
- The Lady Kathleen Lindsay — Lady Superintendent, Inspection Department, Woolwich, Ministry of Munitions
- Engineer-Commander Alfred William Littlewood RN
- Joseph Millro Llewellyn — Assistant Controller, Timber Supplies Department, Ministry of Munitions
- Lieutenant-Colonel Charles Lloyd TD Anti-Aircraft Defences, Home Forces
- Lieutenant-Colonel Ernest Herbert Lloyd — For services with the Egyptian Expeditionary Force
- George William Lloyd ISO Assistant Director, Local Organisation Division, Food Production Department
- Nathaniel Lloyd — National Service Representative
- Alexander Harper Lobban — Late Superintendent of the Sale Branch, Patent Office
- Ruth Loch — Superintendent (Female Staff), Money Order Department, General Post Office
- Major Michael John Long — Anti-Aircraft Defences, Home Forces
- James Lothian — Provost of the Burgh of Campbeltown
- William Dunmore Loveday MRCS LRCP Designer of the Wantage Crutch
- Gerard Horsfall Corbett Lowe JP Honorary Secretary, West Lancashire Branch, British Red Cross Society
- Emily Gertrude Luce — Commandant, Malmesbury Auxiliary Hospital, Wiltshire
- The Hon. Constance Ellinor Lumley — Honorary Treasurer, Young Women's Christian Association. Munition Workers Welfare Committee
- Harry Lyne — Secretary in charge of an Army Area in France, Young Men’s Christian Association
- Major The Hon. Neville Stephen Lytton — For services with the British Expeditionary Force in France
- Major Oliver Hugel Mabee — For services with the British Expeditionary Force in France
- James Macartney — Chairman, Aircraft Fabric Committee; Member, Irish Sub-Committee, Flax Control Board
- Alexander Richardson McBain — Acting Assistant Principal, Mobilisation Directorate, War Office
- Antonia McClintock — Donor, Penoyre Auxiliary Hospital, Brecknockshire
- Arthur John McCormack — Managing Director, Messrs. Wolseley Motors, Limited
- David Edenfield McCracken — Chief Traffic Manager, Mersey Docks and Harbour Board, Liverpool
- Margaret Craig, Lady McCullagh — President, Belfast Branch, Queen Mary's Needlework Guild
- Hector Munro MacDonald — Professor of Mathematics, Aberdeen University; Section Director, Labour Department, Ministry of Munitions
- The Rev. Robert Gordon MacDonald — District Secretary of an Army Area in France, Young Men’s Christian Association
- Nora Mackay — Clerk in the Prime Minister's Secretariat
- John Hugh Munro Mackenzie JP Member of Appeal Tribunal for the County of Argyll
- Lieutenant-Colonel Tom Darke Mackie, Royal Air Force Air Service Constructional Corps
- Alexander Ernest McLaren — Director of Sugar and Bread Distribution Branch, Ministry of Food
- Captain John McMath — Master, Mercantile Marine
- William Halliburton McMullen FRCS Specialist Member of a Recruiting Board
- Major Donald MacNaughton Macrae — For services with the British Expeditionary Force in France
- William Thomas Madden — General Manager, Central Control Board (Liquor Traffic) undertaking at Enfield
- Henry Ashley Madge — Wireless Telegraphy Expert, HMS Vernon.
- Lieutenant William Smith Main RNR Master, Mercantile Marine
- Edward Bellasis Wightman Maitland — Section Director, Gun Ammunition Department, Ministry of Munitions
- William Whitaker Maitland— Government Secretary, Jersey
- Edward Maloney — Assistant Director of Finance, Ministry of Food
- Commander Joseph Man RN Divisional Naval Transport Officer, Calais
- Francis Oscar Mann — Section Director, Labour Department, Ministry of Munitions
- Lieutenant-Colonel Henry Lattin Mansfield — For services with the British Expeditionary Force in France
- Captain Ralph Sheldon Mansfield — For services with the British Expeditionary Force in France
- Thomas Edward Mansfield — Chairman of Blackburn and of Barrow Local Munitions Tribunals
- Major Henry Mansford — Assistant Director of Recruiting, Hampshire Area
- Major Edward William Maples Intelligence Officer, Ministry of Reconstruction
- Frank William Marillier — Manager, Carriage and Wagon Works, Great Northern Railway
- Major John Lynn Marr — Assistant Director, Department of Controller-General for Merchant Shipbuilding, Admiralty
- Lieutenant John Marsden — Ministry of National Service, North-Western Region
- Lieutenant Arthur James Marshall— National Service Representative
- Major The Hon. Reginald Hastings Marsham. Remount Service
- Alfred James Martin — Clerk in the Patent Office
- David Martin — Chief Investigation Officer, West Midlands Division, Ministry of Munitions
- Major William Lewis Martin TD Deputy Commissioner of Medical Services, Ministry of National Service, Perthshire
- Hilda Martindale — HM Senior Lady Inspector of Factories
- George Stephen Maskall — Assistant Dock and Warehouse Manager, Port of London Authority
- Charles James Maslin — Member, Munitions Works Board
- Major James Herbert Mathias — Instructional duties
- Lieutenant-Commander Reginald Foster Pitt Maton RN
- Major Charles Henderson Maxwell — Sub-Commissioner for Trade Exemptions, Ministry of National Service, Scottish Region
- Henry John May — Secretary, International Co-operation Alliance
- Major Otway Mayne — Chief Constable of Buckinghamshire
- Arthur Henry Leslie-Melville JP Treasurer, North Lincolnshire Branch, British Red Cross Society
- Major Robert Menzies — For services with the British Expeditionary Force in France
- Thomas Arthur Merrells — Chairman, Swansea Borough Local Tribunal
- Major Frank Boyd Merriman — For services with the British Expeditionary Force in France
- Lieutenant-Colonel Frank Hamilton Mewburn — Canadian Army Medical Corps
- Marie Louise Michell — Vice-president, Rugby Town Branch, British Red Cross Society
- Sydney William Milford — District Superintendent, London and South-Western Railway
- Thomas Lodwick Miller — General Manager and Secretary, Liverpool Munitions Board of Management
- Gertrude Andrews Milliken — Lady Superintendent and Assistant Honorary Secretary, Belfast Chief Depot of the Ulster Sphagnum Moss Association
- Herbert Ashlin Millington — Clerk to Northamptonshire Appeal Tribunal
- John Archibald Douglas Milne — Town Clerk of Shoreditch
- Sarah Elizabeth Milner — Vice-president, Eckington Division, Derbyshire, British Red Cross Society
- Frank Carlyle Mitchell — Deputy Head Coast Watcher, Port Isaac
- Captain Peter Chalmers Mitchell FRS
- James Moffatt — Provost of the Burgh of Hamilton
- John Moffat — Honorary Secretary, Warwickshire Branch, British Red Cross Society
- Lieutenant-Colonel Thomas Anthony Monckton — Technical Officer, Royal Air Force
- Loftus Balfour Moreton DL JP Chairman, Wolverhampton Local; Tribunal
- Jules Louis Morisons — Managing Director, The General Stores and Munitions Co., Ltd.
- Lieutenanti-Colonel Lyddon Chartris Morley — Officer Commanding an Officer Cadet Battalion
- Lieutenant-Colonel Alfred Drummond Warrington-Morris — Staff Officer, 1st Class, Royal Air Force
- Lieutenant Thomas Robertson Morris RNR Harbour Master, Glasgow
- William Richard Morris — Controller of a Trench Warfare Factory
- Sidney William Morrison — Section Director, Experimental and Technical Branch, Optical and Glassware Department, Ministry of Munitions
- Captain Harold Swithun Morton — Staff Captain War Office
- Andrew Moscrop — Member of the President of the Board of Agriculture's Advisory Committee on Food Production
- The Rev. John Charles Moth — Temporary Chaplain to the Forces, 1st Class
- Lieutenant-Colonel Alan Henry Lawrence Mount — For services with the British Expeditionary Force in France
- John Percy Mountjoy — Divisional Accountant, Coal Mines Department, Board of Trade
- John Moxon — Secretary, Newport Munitions Board of Management
- Harry John Swenson Moyses — Manager, Birmingham Railway Carriage and Wagon Co., Ltd.
- Major James Ernest Muir — Chief Inspector of Auxiliary Shipbuilding, Scotland
- John Muirhead — General Manager, Messrs. Russell & Co., Port Glasgow
- Captain William Percival Mulligan — For services with the British Expeditionary Force in France
- Donald Munro — President of the North Scottish Timber Merchants' Association
- George Frederick Muntzer — Section Director, Agricultural Machinery Department, Ministry of Munitions
- Alexander Murray — Lanarkshire Local War Pensions Committee
- Major William Murray — Deputy Assistant Inspector of Recruiting, Scottish Command
- Horace Muspratt — Honorary Secretary, Liverpool War Savings Committee
- Dudley Borron Myers — Honorary Secretary, Employment Bureau, Queen Mary's Convalescent Auxiliary Hospital, Roehampton
- Lieutenant-Colonel Charles Duncan Myles — For services with the British Expeditionary Force in France
- Captain William John Charles Nash — Master, Mercantile Marine
- Major Colin Graham Neish JP Instructional Duties
- Lieutenant-Colonel Henry Nelson — For services with the British Expeditionary Force in France
- William Nelson — Secretary, Lancashire Aural Board, Ministry of Pensions
- Major Robert Nassau Sutton Nelthorpe JP DL Chairman, Trent Emergency Committee
- Lieutenant-Colonel Frederick William Monk Newell — For services with the British Expeditionary Force in France
- John Montague Newnham DL VD Town Clerk, Croydon
- Robert Beattie Nicholson — Town Clerk, Lowestoft
- Commander Richard John Noal RNR Marine Superintendent, Shaw, Savill & Albion Co., Ltd.
- Frank Arthur Norman — Assistant Divisional Officer, London and South-Eastern Division, Ministry of Labour
- Thomas Keppel North — Superintendent at one of the establishments of Messrs. Tickers, Limited
- Harry Ekermans Oakley— Superintending Civil Engineer, Admiralty
- Maude O'Conor — Leinster Regiment Central Advisory Committee
- Violet Parry-Okeden — Vice-Presfdent, North Greenhoe Division, British Red Cross and Order of St. John of Jerusalem; Commandant, Walsingham Auxiliary Hospital, Norfolk
- Percy Lane Oliver — Secretary, Camberwell Division, County of London Branch, British Red Cross Society
- Captain Frederick George Orme — Inspector, High Explosives, Ministry of Munitions
- Major Alfred Henry Osman
- Major Alfred Lloyd Owen MC For services with the British Expeditionary Force in France
- Edward Tudor Owen — First-Class Clerk, Local Government Board
- John Owen — Food Production Commissioner for North Wales
- Commander Reginald Charles Lloyd Owen RN Coaling Officer to Grand Fleet and Auxiliary Patrol
- Staff Paymaster Reginald Douglas Paffard RN Secretary to Senior Naval Officer, Harwich
- Major Eric Barton Palmer — For services with the British Expeditionary Force in France
- Captain Vivian Trestrail Dampier Palmer — Secretary, Ministry of National Service, South-Eastern Region
- William Harold Palmer — Assistant Director, Railway Materials Department, Ministry of Munitions
- Maude le Clerc Pam — Commandant, Broxbourne Auxiliary Hospital, Wormley Bury, Hertfordshire
- Captain Charles Percival Parker — For services, with the British Expeditionary Force in France
- Edward Parkes — Foreign Office Library
- Charles de Courcy Parry — Chief Constable of Cumberland and Westmorland
- Major Ernest Gambier Parry — Commandant, Goring Auxiliary Hospital, Oxfordshire
- Major Robert Townshend Anwyl-Passingham — Assistant Director of Recruiting, Wrexham Area
- Louise Paterson — Organiser and Founder of Mrs. Paterson's Officers' Club, France
- Joseph Payne — County Secretary for War Savings, Nottinghamshire
- Richard Alfred Ernest Payne — General Manager, The King's Norton Metal Co., Ltd.
- Edwin Peace — Chairman, Wallasey Local Tribunal
- William Herbert Peak — Secretary and Chief Accountant at one of HM Factories, Ministry of Munitions
- Lieutenant-Colonel Edward Raymond Peal DSC Directorate of Aircraft Production, Royal Air Force
- Robert John Addison Pearson — Local Director, Messrs. Vickers, Limited
- Colonel Herbert Haworth Peel — Inspector of Quarter Master-General's Services
- Brevet Major Robert Peel — For services with the British Expeditionary Force, Salonika
- Henrietta, Lady Beresford Peirse — Commandant, Bedale Hall. Auxiliary Hospital, Bedale, Yorkshire
- Maude Katherine Pelham — Secretary, Young Women's Christian Association. War Workers' Welfare Committee
- Beatrice Eleanor, Countess of Pembroke and Montgomery — Vice-president and Organiser, Wilton House Auxiliary Hospital, Salisbury
- The Right Reverend Bishop Adam Urias de Pencier — Temporary Chaplain to the Forces, attached to No. 1 Canadian General Hospital
- Peter John Penney — Naval Ordnance Store Officer, Portsmouth
- Lieutenant-Colonel Thomas Edwin Perrett — Canadian Railway Troops
- Captain John William Perrier — Ministry of National Service
- Leonard Peskett — Naval Architect, Cunard Steamship Co., Ltd.
- Major James Patrie — District Engineer, London, Brighton and South Coast Railway
- Edith Mary Petter — Commandant of 6th Durham Voluntary Aid Detachment Hospital, Darlington
- Godfrey Norris Pharazyn — Secretary, Inter-Allied Meat and Fats Executive, Ministry of Food
- Lieutenant-Colonel Richard Phayre DL JP Chief Organiser of Beachcroft Auxiliary Hospital, Woking, Surrey
- James Charles Philip Honorary Secretary of the Chemical Society
- Ernest Harold Phillips — First Class Clerk, Local Government Board
- Ernest William Phillips — Principal Clerk, Royal Small Arms Factory; lately employed on Special Service in the United States
- Frederick Solomon Phillips — Honorary Assistant Secretary, Ambulance Department, Order of St. John of Jerusalem; Director of Voluntary Aid Detachment Travelling and Finance Department
- Lieutenant-Colonel George Percy Achilles Phillips — Instructional Duties
- Henry Percy Phillips — Honorary Secretary, Monmouthshire Belgian Refugees Committee
- Lilian Marion Estelle Phillips — Vice-president, Bramley Division, British Red Cross Society; Commandant, Thorncombe Auxiliary Hospital, Bramley, Sussex
- Major John Phillipson — For services with the British Expeditionary Force in France
- Bertha Phillpotts — Clerical Assistant, His Britannic Majesty's Legation, Stockholm
- Major Henry Lionel Pigott — Command Land Agent, Southern Command
- Captain John Glyn Pigott — For services with the British Expeditionary Force in France
- Major John Pirn — For services with the British Expeditionary Force in France
- Violet May Pirn — Commandant, Grantham Auxiliary Hospital
- Lieutenant-Colonel Duncan Vernon Pirie — For services with the British Expeditionary Force, Salonika
- Fanny Sarah Marion Pitt — Voluntary Worker with the British Expeditionary Force in France
- Isaiah Platt — Managing Director, Messrs. Samuel Platt, Limited.
- Brevet Major Charles Murray Playfair — Inspector of Carriages, Barrow and Manchester Districts, Ministry of Munitions
- Captain Arthur Joscelyn Coleman Pollock — For services with the British Expeditionary Force in France
- Robert Pollok — Shipyard Manager, Messrs. Vickers, Ltd., Barrow
- Walter Pott — Principal Architect, HM Office of Works
- Reginald Potts — Honorary Secretary, Cheshire War Agricultural Executive Committee
- Thomas Worthington Potts — Chairman, Stockport Local Tribunal
- Kate Haidee Powell — Commandant, Bowden Auxiliary Hospital, Nottingham
- Herbert James Bingham Powell — Munitions Inspector in Charge of Gauge Inspection, U.S.A., Ministry of Munitions
- Charles William Beeston Prescott — Private Secretary to Director, War Trade Department
- William Edward Preston — Assistant to the Chief Goods Manager, London and North Western Railway
- Henry Gilbert Price — Member of the British War Mission to the United States of America
- Major Robert Bateman Prust — For services with the British Expeditionary Force in France
- Thomas Charles Pullinger — Managing Director, Messrs. Arrol, Johnston, Limited
- Lieutenant-Colonel Richard Ireland Purdon — For services with the- British Expeditionary Force in France
- William Frank Purdy — Joint Secretary of the Shipconstructors' and Shipwrights' Association
- Arthur Temple Quelch — The Manganese Bronze and Brass Co., Ltd.
- Arthur Charles Quest — Acting Chief Constable, West Riding Police
- Captain James Robert Rae — Master, Mercantile Marine
- James Ramsay — Plant Superintendent, Caledonian Railway
- Thomas Henry Randolph — Chairman, The Wilkinson Sword Co., Ltd.
- Rose Constance Ravenshaw — Commissioner for the National War Savings Committee
- The Rev. Bernard Stephen Rawlinson CMG Temporary Chaplain to the Forces, 1st Class
- Engineer Captain Alfred Rayner RN Honorary Secretary and Honorary Treasurer, Soldiers' and Sailors' Families' Association, Chatham
- Lieutenant-Colonel Basil Tobin Ready — Commanding an Officer Cadet Battalion
- Captain Thomas Morley Reed — For services with the British Expeditionary Force in France
- William Harvey Reeves — Assistant County Director, Auxiliary Hospitals and Voluntary Aid Detachments, Northamptonshire
- Lieutenant-Colonel Percy Lester Reid — For services with the British Expeditionary Force in France
- Robert Reid — Senior Engineer, Mercantile Marine
- Lieutenant-Colonel Alexander Emil Jacques Reiss — Royal Air Force; Assistant Controller, Materials Branch, Aircraft Production Directorate
- Walter Tapley Restall — Senior Clerk, Exchequer and Audit Department
- Major John Ley Retallack — For services with the British Expeditionary Force in France
- Lieutenant-Colonel Edgar Hercules Reynolds — Staff Officer for Aviation, Australia Imperial Force
- Harold Bulkeley Reynolds — Manager of Plant and Machinery and Design of Plant Installation, Messrs. Babcock and Wilcox, Limited
- Lieutenant-Colonel Reginald Philip Neri Reynolds — For services with the British Expeditionary Force in France
- George Cobley Smyth-Richards — Surveyor to the Devon War Agricultural Executive Committee
- Captain Harold Richards — Officer Commanding New Zealand Mechanical Transport in United Kingdom
- Lieutenant-Colonel Charles William Richardson — For services with the British Expeditionary Force in France
- Acting Commander Sidney Sherlock Richardson RNR RD Officer in charge of Defensive Armament, Trade Division, Admiralty
- Henry Riches — Chief Constable, Borough Police, Middlesbrough
- Major Richard Rigg TD JP Commissioner for the National Wai-Savings Committee
- William Rintoul — Manager of the Research Section at one of the. Factories of Nobel's Explosives Company
- Alfred Henry Roberts — Superintendent, Leith Docks Commission
- Major Richard Cowan Roberts — Deputy Director of Recruiting, Ministry of National Service, Welsh Region
- William Roberts — Liverpool Manager, Messrs. Fred Leyland and Co.
- Duncan John Robertson
- James Alexander Robertson — President, Fleetwood Fishing Vessel Owners' Association
- Dorothy Eyre Robinson — Assistant County Director, Auxiliary Hospitals and Voluntary Aid Detachments, Cheshire
- Maurice Alexander Robinson — Head of White Sugar Branch, Sugar Commission
- Samuel Robinson — Manager at one of the establishments of Messrs. Vickers, Limited
- Lieutenant-Colonel Charles Herman Rogers — Officer Commanding Eastern Ontario Regimental Depot
- Herbert Edwin Wright Rogers — Metropolitan Special Constabulary
- John Rogers — Assistant Director of Materials and Priority, Admiralty
- John Rogers — Head of Technical Department at one of the factories of Nobel's Explosives Co., Ltd.
- Colonel Alfred Shipbon Rooke — For services with the British Expeditionary Force in France
- Captain William David Ross — Deputy Director of Inspection of Munitions (Administration), Ministry of Munitions
- William Henry Ross — Managing Director, Distillers' Co., Ltd.
- Frank de Rougemont — Sub-Commissioner, British Red Cross Society, Port Said
- George John Rowe — Workmen's Representative, Committee on Production
- Margaret Lilian Rowland — County of Denbighshire Association of Voluntary Workers
- Lieutenant-Colonel Francis Maude Roxby — Royal Air Force
- Major Hugh Ernest Rudkin — Staff Captain, War Office
- Acting Commander Henry John Montague Rundle RN
- George Dearie Russell — Inspector, Gun Ammunition, Filling Factories, Ministry of Munitions
- Charles Tamlin Ruthen — Deputy Controller of Accommodation and Chief Inspector, HM Office of Works
- George Thomas Ryder JP Member, Ministry of Munitions Special Arbitration Tribunal on Women's Wages; late District Delegate of the Amalgamated Society of Engineers; Member, Birmingham Munitions Board of Management
- Captain Ernest Walter Salcombe — Sub-Commissioner, British Red Cross Society, Mesopotamia
- Mary Augusta Compton Salmond — Honorary Secretary, Derbyshire Branch, Incorporated Soldiers' and Sailors' Help Society
- Charles Herbert Sample — Food Production Commissioner for North of England
- The Hon. Ina Sandbach — President, Montgomeryshire Branch, British Red Cross Society
- Isabella Emma Sandeman — Deputy President, Brighton, Hove and Preston Division, Sussex Branch, British Red Cross Society
- Ronald Leighton Sandeman — Chief Dilution Officer, Northern Division, Ministry of Munitions
- 2nd Lieutenant Percy Alan Sanders — Partner, Messrs. Davey, Paxman & Co.
- Major Thomas Lindsay Sandes MBE Officer in charge of the Surgical Division, South African Hospital, Richmond
- Harold Eustace Satow MBE His Britannic Majesty's Consul, Larissa
- Charles Skinner Satterly — County Secretary for War Savings, Lincolnshire
- Jane Anne, Baroness de Saumarez — Vice-president, Ipswich Division, British Red Cross Society, Suffolk Branch
- Samuel Edgar Saunders — Managing Director, Messrs. S. E. Saunders, Limited
- Lieutenant-Commander Richard Say RNVR Fleet Mail Officer
- Joseph Scholes — Assistant Director of Vegetable Supplies, Ministry of Food
- Louisa Leslie Florence Scott — Joint Women's Voluntary Aid Detachment Department, Devonshire House
- Lieutenant-Colonel Vincent Marcus Barron Scully — For an act of gallantry not in the presence of the enemy
- George Gaunt Senior — District Goods Superintendent, Lancashire and Yorkshire Railway
- Colonel The Rev. William Floyd Shannon — Senior Presbyterian Chaplain, Australian Imperial Force
- Richard William Sharpies — Assistant Director, Munitions Overseas Transport, Ministry of Munitions
- Edward Herbert Shaughnessy — Staff Engineer, General Post Office
- Lieutenant Robert Shaw — Deputy Director of Labour Supply, Ministry of National Service, Northern Region
- Montague Shearman — HM Procurator-General's Department, Intelligence Branch
- Mary Katharine, Baroness Sheffield — Vice-president, Alderley Division of Cheshire; Administrator, Alderley Park Auxiliary Hospital, Chelford, Cheshire
- Walter Rider Shephard — Section Director, Mechanical Transport Department, Ministry of Munitions
- Commander Carlton Collingwood Sherman RN Deputy Director of Torpedo and Mines Production, Admiralty
- Major Hugh Short — New Zealand Medical Corps
- Lieutenant-Colonel Cyril Ambrose Shove — Staff Officer, 1st Class, Royal Air Force
- Charles William Shute — Naval Architect, Union Castle Line
- James Percy Shuter — Town Clerk, Fulham
- John Frederick Sieber — Chief Clerk, Sugar Commission
- Major James William Bradford Silverthorne — For services with the British Expeditionary Force in France
- George Arthur Skentelbery — Manager, Blyth Shipbuilding & Dry Docks Company
- Captain Donald Chipman Skinner — For services with the British Expeditionary Force in France
- Major Ernest Sleight TD Navy and Army Canteen Board
- George Clarence Smallwood — Secretarial Officer, Ministry of Munitions
- Samuel Smiles FRS Assistant Professor of Chemistry, University College, London
- Major David Joseph Smith — Directorate of Supplies and Transport, War Office
- Frances Louise Kyrle-Smith — Honorary Organiser. Nottingham Hospital Supply Depot
- Robert James Smith Chairman, Cardiff Local War Pensions Committee
- Sydney Edwin Smith — Assistant Controller, Munitions Accounts, Ministry of Munitions
- William James Smith — Director, The Tank Storage and Carriage Company
- Altamont Smythe — Lady Superintendent, Alexandria Hospital, British Red Cross Commission, Egypt
- Major Frederick Wilkinson Smyth — For services with the British Expeditionary Force in France
- Lieutenant-Colonel Irvine Robinson Snider — Manitoba Regiment
- Cyril Ralph Snowden — Secretary, Finance Section, Ministry of Blockade
- Captain Frank Somers — Chief Engineer and Director, Messrs. Walter Somers and Co., Ltd.
- Lieutenant-Colonel John Henry Willes Southey — Officer in Charge, Warwick Infantry Record Office
- James Moloney Spaight Acting Principal Clerk, Air Ministry
- Lieutenant-Colonel Ralph Harold Austin-Sparks — Staff Officer, 1st Class, Royal Air Force
- Commander Richard Ernest Speranza RD RNR
- Benjamin Charles Spoor — In charge of Young Men’s Christian Association work in Macedonia and the Mediterranean
- William Teulon Swan Stallybrass — Section Director, Priority Department, Ministry of Munitions
- Ernest William Stanger — County Secretary for War Savings, Lancashire
- The Hon. Adele Scudamore Stanhope — Chairman of the War Workers' Welfare Committee, Young Men’s Christian Association
- Alfred Ernest Steel — Honorary Treasurer, Anglo-South-American Central Red Cross Depot
- Edith Stevens — Commandant, Kempston Auxiliary Hospital, Bedford
- Acting Commander Archibald Thomas Stewart RN British Naval Representative at Bizerta
- Percy Malcolm Stewart JP Section Director, Government Rolling Mills Department, Ministry of Munitions
- Henry John Scott Stobart — Managing Director, Messrs. Chance Brothers and Co., Ltd.
- Jessica Octavia Stobart — Commandant, 17th Durham V.A. Hospital, Etherley, Bishop Auckland
- George Herbert Stoker — Senior: Clerk, Accountant-General's Department, India Office
- Gilbert Stoker — Section Director, Central Stores Department, Ministry of Munitions
- Edgar Cooper Stoneham — Accountant, Finance Department, Board of Trade
- Herbert William Stovold — Assistant Director of Finance, Ministry of Food
- Helena Violet Alice, Countess of Stradbroke — Acting President, East Suffolk Branch, British Red Cross Society
- Major Edward John Stuart — Inspector, Trench Warfare Stores, Ministry of Munitions
- Laura Elizabeth Stuart — Joint Honorary Secretary of the Norfolk and Norwich Association of Voluntary Workers
- Edith Melba Stunt — Commandant, St. Mark's Auxiliary Hospital, Tunbridge Wells
- Edward Vyse Sturdy — Parliamentary Department, Foreign Office
- Leonard Sumner — Chairman and managing director, The Broughton Copper Co., Ltd.
- Alfred Sutro — Head of the Censorship Section, War Trade Intelligence Department
- Robert Hunter Swainson — Secretary, Young Men’s Christian Association. Munitions Department
- Charles Robert John Atkin Swan Administrative Medical Officer, Royal Air Force Hospitals
- Laura Beatrix Swanwick — Commandant, Bingham Hall Auxiliary Hospital, Cirencester
- Lieutenant-Colonel Edward Hopton Swayne — Officer Commanding a Training Reserve Battalion
- Major George Arthur Sykes — Deputy Assistant Quarter Master-General, Egyptian Expeditionary Force
- Sandham John Symes — Chief Locomotive Draughtsman, Midland Railway
- Major Bernard Treleaven Taperell — For services with the British Expeditionary Force in France
- Bateman Brown Tarring — Works Manager at a National Filling Factory
- John Taylor JP President of the Dudley Trades Council
- John Taylor JP Provost of Clydebank
- Major Thomas Alexander Hatch Taylor MC For services with the British Expeditionary Force in France
- David Thomas — Sub-Inspector of Schools, Cardiganshire
- Ethel Thomas — Assistant Controller, Queen Mary's Army Auxiliary Corps
- Farrar Wolferstan Thomas — Secretary and Accountant, Red Cross Commission, British East Africa
- Jessie Thomas — Vice-president, East Lancashire Branch, British Red Cross Society!
- John Frederick Ivor Thomas, Munitions Inspector, Chicago and Cleveland Districts, U.S.A., Ministry of Munitions
- Joseph Silvers Williams-Thomas JP Chairman, British Flint Glass Manufacturers' Association, Limited; chairman, Messrs. Stevens & Williams, Limited
- Major Archibald Henry James Thompson — Deputy Chief Valuer and Compensation Officer, Lands Directorate
- Lieutenant-Commander William Peter Thompson RNR Marine Superintendent, Messrs. Elder, Dempster & Co.
- John Thomson — General Secretary of the Associated Blacksmiths' and Ironmongers' Society
- May Thorne In charge of Sisters, Hospital and Staff Departments, Malta
- Arthur Winton Thorpe — Director of Publicity, Ministry of Food
- Harry Voce Thurgood — Honorary Auditor, Soldiers' and Sailors' Families' Association
- Captain Norman G. Thwaites MC Special duties in U.S.A
- Francis Oswald Tindley — Secretary — Headquarters Trading Department, Young Men’s Christian Association
- Benjamin Edward Todhunter JP Managing Director, The Cotton Powder Co., Ltd.
- Captain Francis Horatio Evory Townsend MC For services with the British Expeditionary Force in France
- Louis Tracy — Member of the British War Mission to the United States of America
- Frederick Thomas Travers FRCS Commandant and Medical Officer, Maidstone Auxiliary Hospital, Maidstone, Kent
- Captain John Claude Lewis Tremayne JP Assistant Director of National Service, West London and District Area
- George Macaulay Trevelyan — Commandant, Motor Ambulance Convoy No. 1, British Red Cross Commission, Italy
- Lieutenant-Colonel Richard James Fynmore Trew — For services with the British Expeditionary Force in France
- Wilfrid Richard Trickett— Legal Assistant, Treasury Solicitor's Department
- Major Claude Henry Tritton — For services with the British Expeditionary Force in France
- Harry Woodward Trotter MBE Committee Clerk, Board of Customs and Excise
- Major John Frederick Arthur Trotter — For services with the British Expeditionary Force in France'
- Lieutenant-Colonel Arthur Philip Hamilton Trueman — Officer Commanding an Officer Cadet Battalion
- Captain Frederick William Tubb — Marine Superintendent, Atlantic Transport Line
- Major Francis Cannon Tudsbery Tudsbery — Secretary, War Office Lands and Buildings Reconstruction Committee, and Ministry of Munitions Special Committee for Lands and Buildings
- Angus Alexander Gregorie Tulloch — Honorary Treasurer, East Lancashire Branch, British Red Cross Society
- William Forbes Tulloch — Member of the British Commission to Holland regarding Oils and Fats
- Isabel Mary Tunnard — Vice-president, Boston District, South Lincolnshire Branch, British Red Cross Society
- Lieutenant-Colonel Eyre Anthony Weldon Turbett — For services with the British Expeditionary Force in France
- Helen Burgess Turner MBE Matron of the Central Red Cross Work Rooms, Royal Academy
- Miles Eaton Arundel Turner — Commercial Attaché, His Britannic Majesty's Legation, Copenhagen
- Captain Fred Turney — For services with the British Expeditionary Force in France
- Walter Bertram Turnock — Manager, The Port Talbot Steel Co., Ltd.
- William Alfred Turpin — Managing Director, Messrs. W. and G. Du Cros, Limited
- Alfred Robert Turtill — Senior Staff Officer, Claims and Record Office, Kew, Ministry of Labour
- Willie Jack Trevor Turton — Assistant Inspector, Local Government Board
- Albert Percy Twigg — Chief Meat Supervisor, Ministry of Food
- Mildred Caroline Twiss — Joint Women's Voluntary Aid Detachment Department, Devonshire House
- Lieutenant Thomas Twist — Section Director, Small Arms Ammunition Department, Ministry of Munitions
- Major Francis Cameron Tyler, Royal Field Artillery. Instructional duties
- Major Alexander Lewis Urquhart — Royal Army Medical Corps For services with the British Expeditionary Force, Salonika
- Thirza Beatrice Urwick — Secretary to Voluntary Aid Organisation and to Red Cross Work Rooms, Shropshire
- Major The Hon. Osbert Eustace Vesey — For services with the British Expeditionary Force in France
- William Vincent Waite — General Works Manager, Messrs. Marshall, Sons & Co., Ltd., Gainsborough
- Lieutenant-Colonel Arthur Brittan Wakelin — For services with the British Expeditionary Force in France
- Captain Thomas George Wakeling — President of a Recruiting Medical Board
- Colonel Francis John Walker VD County Director, Auxiliary Hospitals and Voluntary Aid Detachments, North Lincolnshire
- Major Nigel Ouchterlony Walker — Lands Directorate, War Office
- Arthur Joseph Wall — Acting Secretary to the Prison Commissioners
- Major James Hill Wallace — Canadian Young Men’s Christian Association
- Captain John Wallace — Deputy Commissioner of Medical Services, Ministry of National Service
- Colonel Stanier Waller CVO County Director, Auxiliary Hospitals and Voluntary Aid Detachments, Oxfordshire
- Colonel Charles Thomas Wallis VD DL County Director, Auxiliary Hospitals and Voluntary Aid Detachments, Monmouthshire (To be dated 21 May 1918)
- Captain Harry Henden Walmsley — For services with the British Expeditionary Force in France
- Commander George Augustus Crosbie Ward RN
- Captain Frank Warde — For services with the British Expeditionary Force in France
- John Isaac de Wardt, First Class Clerk — Secretary's Office, General Post Office
- Captain Robert Campbell Warden — Principal Officer, Mercantile Marine Staff, Board of Trade
- David Warnock — British Remount Commission, Canada
- Major Duncan Grant Warrand — For services with the British Expeditionary Force in France
- Lieutenant-Colonel Alfred Hainan Warren JP Chairman of Local Tribunal, National Relief Fund, and Belgian Refugees' Committee, Poplar
- Arthur Egerton Watson — Secretarial Officer, Ministry of Munitions
- Henry Watson — Director, Tredegar Dry Dock Company
- John Henderson Watson — Chief Constable, City Police, Bristol
- Charles Manley Watts — Assistant Director of Registration, Ministry of Food
- Captain John Hunter Watts — For services with the British Expeditionary Force in France
- Samuel John Wavish — Shipbuilding Manager, Messrs. Cammell, Laird and Co., Ltd.
- Captain Frederick William Wayne — For services with the British Expeditionary Force, Salonika
- Major Edward Clive Webb FRCVS For services with the British Expeditionary Force in France
- Fleet Surgeon Alfred Ernest Weightman RN Medical Department, Admiralty
- Robert Anthony Ettrick Welford — Chief Investigation Officer, North-Western Division, Ministry of Munitions
- The Hon. Edith Maria West — Organiser, Belgravia Red Cross Work Rooms
- George Philip West — Steel Superintendent, Materials and Priority Department, Admiralty
- Frederick Arthur Westlake — Assistant Chief of Section at the Central Office, Ministry of Labour
- Colonel William Alexander Wetherall — County Director, Auxiliary Hospitals and Voluntary Aid Detachments, Staffordshire
- Mina Ricketts Sarah Elizabeth Wethered — Honorary Secretary of the County of Gloucestershire Association of Voluntary Workers
- Colonel Edward Vincent Vashon Wheeler VD Chairman, Worcestershire War Agricultural Executive Committee
- Herbert Edward Ogle Wheeler — District Superintendent. South-Eastern and Chatham Railway
- Clare White — General Secretary, Royal Army Temperance Association
- Madge Macarthur White — Private Secretary to the Minister of Reconstruction
- Captain John Hubert Whitehouse — For services with the British Expeditionary Force in France
- Captain Cyprian Charles Oswald Whiteley — For services with the British Expeditionary Force in France
- Martha Annie Whiteley Research Chemist, Chemical Warfare Department, Ministry of Munitions
- George Hewitt Whiteman — Messrs. Allen, Everitt & Co., Smethwick
- Roland Whitelocke Whitlock — Marine Insurance Expert, Ministry of Food
- John Whyte — Chief Engineer, Mercantile Marine
- Lieutenant-Colonel John Avenal Wickham — For services with the British Expeditionary Force in France
- Owen William Wightman JP Assistant Director, Brewing Branch — Ministry of Food
- Evelyn Caryl Bootle Wilbraham Director, Messrs. Coley & Wilbraham. Limited
- Lieutenant Albert Edward Wilcock RNVR Coast Watching Officer
- John Wilkinson, Engineer and Manager, The Nottingham Corporation Gas Works
- Arthur Moray Williams — Assistant County Director, Hampshire Branch, British Red Cross Society
- David Williams — Chief Constable, Cardiff City Police
- Henry Owen Williams ISO Late Assistant Director of Contracts, Ministry of Munitions
- Annie Margery Williams Mabel Catherine St. John Williams — In charge of a coffee stall with the British Expeditionary Force, France
- Brevet Major Walton d'Eichthal Williams — For services with the British Expeditionary Force in France
- Captain Alexander Williamson.
- Zwinglius Frank Willis — Assistant Secretary for Young Men’s Christian Association work in France
- Alexander Wilson — Assistant to the General Manager, North Eastern Railway
- Lieutenant-Colonel Edward Arthur Wilson MC For an act of gallantry not in the presence of the enemy
- Lieutenant-Colonel Francis Bertram Wilson — For services with the British Expeditionary Force in France
- Frank Wilson — Messrs. Wilson Brothers. West African Merchants
- Major John Wilson — Officer Clerk, War Office Establishment
- Cornelia Henrietta Maria, Dowager Baroness Wimborne — Founder and President of the Dorset Guild of Workers
- Henry Martin Winearls — Chief Clerk to the Companies Department, Board of Trade
- Acting Staff Paymaster Alexander Charles Winter RN
- Major Harold Stephen Bigg-Wither — For services with the British Expeditionary Force in France
- Amy Violet — Wodehouse Organiser and Honorary Secretary, Prisoners of War Committee, British Red Cross Society, Worcestershire
- Benjamin George Wood JP Honorary Treasurer, Army and Navy Aid Committee, Sheffield
- Frances Wood MBE Special Investigator, Central Statistical Branch, Ministry of Munitions
- Fleet Surgeon Samuel Henry Woods RN
- Thomas Budge Work — Honorary Secretary, Orkney War Savings Committee
- Alice Hill Workman — Voluntary Worker with the British Expeditionary Force in France
- Margaret Elliot Workman — Voluntary Worker with the British Expeditionary Force in France
- Arthur Wormald — Works Manager, Messrs. Rolls-Royce, Limited
- Frances Gertrude Somers Worsley Worswick — Joint Manager of the Ampleforth Hut, Catholic Club, France
- Frank Wilson Wright — Live Stock Commissioner, N.E. Midlands, Ministry of Food
- George Hudson Wright — Engineering Manager, Messrs. Cammell, Laird & Co.
- Lieutenant-Colonel Francis Joseph Caldwell Wyatt MC For services with the British Expeditionary Force in France
- Charles Robert Young Secretary, Chemical Warfare Committee, Ministry of Munitions
- Lieutenant-Colonel Patrick Charles Young — For services with the British Expeditionary Force in France
- Major Thomas Dunlop Young — For services with the British Expeditionary Force in France
- Jessie Alice Younger — Senior Organising Officer for Women's Work, Scotland, Ministry of Labour

India

- John Hunter Adam — Indian Police; Personal Assistant to the Inspector-General of Police, North-West Frontier Province
- Richard Percival Adams — Chief Inspector of Factories, Bengal
- Dr William Albert-Briggs — Medical Missionary in Siam
- John William Armstrong — Manager, New Egerton Woollen Mills, Dhariwal, Punjab
- John Ashford — Public Works Department; Superintendent, Central Workshops Division, Upper Bari Doab Canal, Amritsar, Punjab
- Rai Chhote Lai Bahadur — Railway Contractor, Moradabad, United Provinces
- Robert George Bellairs — Tea-planter, Almora District, United Provinces
- Frank Douglas Bennett — of Messrs. Wrenn, Bennett & Co., Ltd., Madras
- Evelyn Blakeway — President, Ladies' Red Cross Committee, North-West Frontier Province
- Thomas William Bonner — Locomotive Superintendent, Great Indian Peninsula Railway, Bombay
- Rai Bahadur Sir Kailash Chandra Bose CIE Medical Practitioner, Calcutta
- Major Ernest William Charles Bradfield FRCSE Indian Medical Service; Officer in charge of the Madras War Fund, River Hospital Ship Sikkim
- John Coggin Browne — Imperial Service; Assistant Superintendent, Geological Survey of India
- Francis Holy Burkitt — Executive Engineer, Irrigation (Public Works) Department, North-West Frontier Province
- John Campbell, — Indian Civil Service; Deputy Commissioner of Kheri, United Provinces
- William Ramage Carstairs — Chairman of the River-craft Committee, Karachi, and managing director, Messrs. Cosser & Co., Karachi
- Dewan Tek Chand Indian Civil Service; Barrister-at-Law; Assistant Postal Censor, Karachi
- Joseph Miles Clay — Indian Civil Service; Deputy Commissioner of Garhwal, United Provinces
- Alexander Cochran — Managing Director, Messrs. Burn & Co., Calcutta
- Robert Denby Coggan — Manager of the Khasi Hills Prospecting and Mining Syndicate, Assam
- Captain David Patrick Copeland — Recruiting Officer, at present in Military employ, Assam
- Adela Cottle
- Lieutenant-Colonel James Muir Crawford CM Indian Medical Service, Benares, United Provinces.
- Walter Erskine Crum — Major, Calcutta Light Horse. Partner, Messrs. Graham & Co., Bengal
- Marjorie Stevenesson Cumming — President, Ootacamund Centre of the Madras War Fund Ladies' Depot.
- Jarbanoo Dadabhoy
- Rani Abhayeswari Debi — of Bijni, Zamindar, Goalpara District, Assam
- Raja Rajendra Narayan Bhanja Deo — of Kanika. Landholder, Bihar and Orissa, and an Additional Member of the Council of the Governor-General for making Laws and Regulations
- Raja Brij Mohan Deo — Feudatory Chief of Kalahandi, Orissa. Nawab Malik Khuda Bakhsh Khan, Tiwana, Extra Assistant Commissioner, Punjab; now a member of the Bahawalpur State Council, Punjab
- Hormusji Cowasjee Dinshaw MVO Senior Partner in the Firm of Messrs. Cowasjee Dinshaw and Brothers, Aden, Bombay
- Archibald Alexander Dunbar-Brander — Imperial Forest Service; Divisional Forest Officer, Nimar, Central Provinces
- Alfred Ezra
- William Stuart Fraser — Locomotive Superintendent, Bombay, Baroda and Central India Railway, Ajmer, Rajputana
- Oscar de Glanville — Barrister-at-Law; Western Sub-Divisional Magistrate, Rangoon, Burma
- Joseph Ernest Goudge — Indian Civil Service; Deputy Commissioner of Sitapur, United Provinces
- William David Gray — Assistant to the Financial Adviser, Military Finance, Government of India
- Eustace Edward Gunter — Director, Persian Gulf Telegraphs
- Ada Gurdon
- Khan Bahadur Sardar Abdul Hamid — Chief Secretary to His Highness the Maharaja of Kapurthala, Punjab
- Captain John Ernest Buttery Hotson — Indian Civil Service and Indian Army Reserve of Officers; Assistant for Mekran to the Political Agent in Kalat and Commandant, Mekran Levy Corps, Baluchistan
- William Henry Ker Howard — Chief Engineer, Oudh and Rohilkhand Railway, Lucknow, United Provinces
- William Richard Howson — His Britannic Majesty's Consul, Bunder Abbas, Persian Gulf
- Major William Gordon Hutchinson — Indian Army; Political Agent, Chagai, Baluchistan
- Ghazanfar Ali Khan — Indian Civil Service; Deputy Commissioner, Nimar, Central Provinces
- Honorary Captain Nawab Malik Muhammad Mubariz Khan — Tiwana, Shanpur, Punjab
- Dewan Shujat Ali Khan — Seoni, Central Provinces
- Jehangir Hormusji Kothari — Karachi, Sind, Bombay
- Surat Kunwar — of Khairagarh, District Kheri, United Provinces
- Isa Charan Chandu Lai ISO Deputy Commissioner, Gujrat, Punjab
- Elsie Margaret Lenox Conyngham
- Clara, Lady Lovett — Oudh Branch of the Ladies' Association work
- Brevet Lieutenant-Colonel Thomas Mawe Luke DSO Royal Artillery. Director of Administration, Adjutant, General's Branch, Army Headquarters
- James Mackenzie — Partner of Messrs. McNeil & Co., Calcutta
- Jamsetji Framji Madan — Supplier to Supply and Transport Corps, 8th (Lucknow) Division, Bengal
- Richard Vivian Mansell — Partner of Messrs. James, Finlay & Co., Calcutta
- Engineer Commander Archibald Anthony McDonald — Royal Indian Marine; Senior Marine Transport Officer for Coaling Duties, Bombay
- Margaret Julia, Lady Miller — President, Bangalore Ladies' Branch of the British Red Cross Society and Order of St. John of Jerusalem
- David James Murtrie ISO Deputy Director-General of the Post Office, formerly Presidency Postmaster, Bombay
- James Ernest Needham — of Messrs. Purdie & Co., Freight Brokers, Bombay
- Catherine, Lady Nicholson — Secretary, Coonoor Centre of the Madras War Fund Ladies' Depot
- Rai Bahadur Lala Sheo Parshad CIE Banker and Honorary Magistrate, Delhi
- Kanakarayan Tirufelvam Paul — General Secretary, Young Men’s Christian Association, Bengal
- Captain Albert Gottlieb Puech VD Indian Army Reserve of Officers; Assistant Recruiting Officer for Gurgaon, and Honorary Magistrate, Sirsa, Hissar District, Punjab
- Frank Winckworth Austice Prideaux — Additional Judicial Commissioner, Nagpur, Central Provinces
- Archibald John Pugh — (Colonel). Commandant, Calcutta Light Horse; Honorary Aide-de-Camp to His Excellency the Viceroy
- Richard Stanley Purssell — Personal Assistant to the Director-General of Posts and Telegraphs, Punjab
- Beatrice Reid
- Major Henry Ross FRCSI Additional Assistant Director-General, Indian Medical Service, Bengal
- Jotindra Nath Roy — Indian Civil Service; Collector of North Arcot District, Madras
- Arthur Charles Rumboll — General Traffic Manager, Great Indian Peninsula Railway, Bombay
- Nirmul Chunder Sen — Local Adviser to Indian Students in London
- Raja Harihar Prasad Narayan Singh — of Amawan. Landholder, Bihar and Orissa
- Rao Bahadur Thakur Hari Singh — of Sattasar. Military Member of the State Council, Bikaner, Rajputana. Rani
- Sardar Raghbir Singh — of Raja Sansi. Jagirdar and Honorary Magistrate, 1st Class, Amritsar, Punjab
- Risaldar Chaudhri Amar Singh — Rai Bahadur, of Pali, District Bulandshahr, United Provinces
- Kumar Sheonandan Prasad Singh — Landholder, Bihar and Orissa
- Oona Standen
- Captain Hugh Stott Indian Medical Service; Medical Officer on Board, the Hospital Ship, Madras
- Vere Arthur Stowell — Indian Civil Service. Secretary, War Board, Lucknow, United Provinces
- Walter Lancelot Travers — Captain, Northern Bengal Mounted Rifles. Manager, Baradighi Tea Estate, Western Duars: Chairman, Duars Planters' Association, Bengal
- Anna Tuke
- Captain Duncan Frederick Vines — Royal Indian Marine Port Officer, Calcutta
- Valentine Patrick Terrell Vivian — Indian Police; assistant director of Central Intelligence
- George Edward Campbell Wakefield — Director-General of Revenue, His Exalted Highness the Nizam's Government, Hyderabad, Deccan
- Ivy Walsh — President, Patna Branch of the British Red Cross Society and Order of St. John of Jerusalem
- David St. Clair Wedderburn — East Indian Railway, Locomotive Superintendent, Jamalpur, Bihar and Orissa
- Alfred Lefevre Rowllings

Egypt and the Sudan

- Arthur David Alban — His Majesty's Consul at Cairo since 1903
- John Ball MBE Chief Inspector of Geological Survey
- Albert Ernest Branch — Chief Veterinary Inspector
- William Hastings — Director of Hospitals in the Department of Health
- Captain Charles McKey —Director of Customs, Sudan Government
- Robert Earle Monteith-Smith — Assistant Director-General of Public Security and Chairman of Executive Committee, Young Men’s Christian Association, Egyptian Expeditionary Force
- Charles Herbert Page — Acting Director, Steamers Department, Sudan Government
- Burton Pearson — Divisional Traffic Superintendent, Egyptian State Railways
- Arthur Sansome Preston — Crown Prosecutor for Egypt and Procurator in the Alexandria Prize
- Major Robert Vesey Savile — Reserve of Officers. Governor of Darfur Province, Sudan
- Charles Todd — Principal Bacteriologist of the Department of Public Health

Honorary Officers

- Sheikh Mahomed Mustafa Al-Maraghi, Grand Qadi of the Sudan

== See also ==
- 1918 Birthday Honours – Full list of awards.
