= Francis Wyatt (cricketer) =

English cricketer

Personal information
- Full name: Francis Joseph Caldwell Wyatt
- Born: 10 July 1882; Trichinopoly, Madras Province, British India
- Died: 5 May 1971 (aged 88); Chichester, Sussex, England
- Batting: Right-handed
- Bowling: Right-arm medium
- Relatives: Archie Douglas (brother-in-law)

Domestic team information
- Years: Team
- 1905–1919: Hampshire
- 1906/07: Orange Free State

Career statistics
Competition	First-class
Matches	21
Runs scored	168
Batting average	5.79
100s/50s	–/–
Top score	26
Balls bowled	3,629
Wickets	90
Bowling average	20.47
5 wickets in innings	6
10 wickets in match	–
Best bowling	6/31
Catches/stumpings	16/–
- Source: ESPNcricinfo, 4 March 2010

Francis Joseph Caldwell Wyatt OBE MC (10 July 1882 — 5 May 1971) was an English first-class cricketer and British Army officer.

The son of The Reverend Joseph Light Wyatt, he was born in British India at Trichinopoly in July 1882. Wyatt was educated firstly at Dulwich College, before proceeding to Glenalmond College. From there, he attended the Royal Military Academy, Woolwich. Wyatt graduated from there into the Royal Engineers as a second lieutenant in February 1901, with promotion to lieutenant following in February 1904. It was in 1904 that he made his debut in first-class cricket, for the Gentlemen of England against Oxford University at Oxford. The following season, he made his debut for Hampshire against the touring Australians, and additionally played for the Gentlemen of the South against the Players of the South. He made four appearances for Hampshire in the 1906 County Championship, prior to playing in South Africa for Orange Free State on four occasions in December 1906–January 1907; his time in South Africa saw him take 19 wickets at an average of 17.47, with one five wicket haul (5 for 17) against Western Province. In 1908, he made five first-class appearances for Hampshire.

In the Royal Engineers, Wyatt was promoted to captain in February 1911. Prior to the First World War, he made three first-class appearances for the British Army cricket team against the Royal Navy at Lord's in 1912, 1913, and 1914. In these, he took 22 wickets at an average of 16.45; he took one five wicket haul (6 for 56) in the 1912 season. Wyatt served in the war on the Western Front, during which he was made awarded the Military Cross in January 1916. He was made a temporary major in March 1916, with full promotion to the rank following in November of the same year. Wyatt was made an OBE in the 1918 Birthday Honours for services with the British Expeditionary Force. Shortly prior to the conclusion of the war, he was appointed Controller of Camouflage with the temporary rank of lieutenant colonel. Following the war, he returned to first-class for Hampshire, making a single appearance in the 1919 County Championship against Yorkshire, before making a final first-class appearance for the Army against Oxford University in 1920. For Hampshire in eleven matches, he took 44 wickets at average of 21.25, with four five wicket hauls and best figures of 6 for 31 against Somerset in 1908.

In July 1926, he was appointed to the Air Defence Experimental Establishment. In September of that year, he was promoted to the full rank of lieutenant colonel, and having spent four years as a regimental colonel, he was placed on the half-pay list and promoted to colonel in September 1930. Wyatt was appointed president to the Royal Engineers and Signals Board in June 1936, prior to his retirement from active service in December 1937. Wyatt died at Chichester in May 1971. His brother-in-law, Archie Douglas, was also a first-class cricketer.
