= Frank Finlay (cricketer) =

Irish cricketer and British Army officer

Personal information
- Full name: Frank Dalzell Finlay
- Born: 31 August 1868; Belfast, Ireland
- Died: 21 January 1947 (aged 78); Biarritz, Basses-Pyrénées, France
- Batting: Unknown

Domestic team information
- Years: Team
- 1902: Marylebone Cricket Club

Career statistics
Competition	First-class
Matches	1
Runs scored	19
Batting average	19.00
100s/50s	–/–
Top score	19
Catches/stumpings	–/–
- Source: Cricinfo, 9 November 2020

Frank Dalzell Finlay OBE (31 August 1868 – 21 January 1947) was an Irish first-class cricketer and British Army officer.

The grandson of Francis Dalzell Finlay, the founder of the Northern Whig, he was born at Belfast in August 1868. Initially serving with the 6th Brigade of the Northern Irish Division, Finlay transferred to the Suffolk Regiment as a second lieutenant in November 1888. He was promoted to lieutenant in March 1892, before being promoted to captain in December 1897. Finlay made a single appearance in first-class cricket for the Marylebone Cricket Club (MCC) against Leicestershire at Lord's in 1902. Batting once in the match, he scored 19 runs in the MCC first innings before being dismissed by Reginald Crawford. Finlay was transferred to the Wiltshire Regiment in February 1910, at which point he was promoted to major. He was appointed assistant military secretary to General Sir Leslie Rundle in November 1912.

He served in the First World War with the Wiltshire Regiment, serving in February 1915 as a general staff officer. He was promoted to lieutenant colonel in July 1916, before being appointed a Deputy Assistant Quartermaster-General in November of the same year. He was appointed an OBE in the 1918 Birthday Honours for his services to the British Expeditionary Force. Following the war, he held the appointment of Assistant Director-General of Transportation in the Wiltshire Regiment, having been placed on the half-pay list in March of the same year. Finlay retired from active service in February 1920.

He later died at the age of 78 in France at Biarritz in January 1947.
