= Andrew Nicholl =

Irish painter (1804–1886)

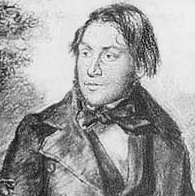
- Self Portrait
- Born: 4 April 1804; Belfast, Ireland, United Kingdom
- Died: 16 April 1886 (aged 82); Camberwell, England, United Kingdom
- Resting place: West Norwood Cemetery
- Known for: Founder of Belfast Association of Artists

Andrew Nicholl RHA (4 April 1804 – 16 April 1886) was an Irish painter. He was a founding member of the Belfast Association of Artists and in 1847 was elected as an associate member to the Royal Hibernian Academy, becoming a full member in 1860.

== Early life ==
Nicholl was born in Belfast on 4 April 1804, the second son of Henry Nicholl, a bootmaker. In 1822, at the age of 18, he was apprenticed to printer Francis Dalzell Finlay for seven years. He worked as a compositor on The Northern Whig which was founded in 1824. Though he worked in the letterpress department, drawing and painting was an interest from childhood. He received encouragement from his older brother, painter William Nicholl (1794-1840), and possibly some instruction.

== Career ==
He found patronage under Sir James Emerson Tennent, who funded a trip to London in 1830-1832. In 1832 he exhibited his work at the RHA in Dublin and at the Royal Academy, London.

Tennent's patronage also secured for him an appointment as teacher of landscape drawing, painting and design at the Colombo Academy (later Royal College, Colombo) in Sri Lanka. He embarked for Ceylon in August 1846, crossing Egypt by camel to the Red Sea, returning to Britain in 1849. After his trip to Ceylon he developed a more colorful style and painted the flower pieces that he has been remembered for. He rewarded his patron (by then Colonial Secretary) by illustrating parts of the latter's descriptive book about the island, Ceylon, Physical, Historical and Topographical. A watercolour entitled The Great Sphinx with a pyramid of Khufu and another boat of Aden indicate other stops on this voyage.

He died at Camberwell on 16 April 1886 and was buried at West Norwood Cemetery. The Ulster History Circle has a blue plaque to him at his birth house at 10 Church Lane, Belfast.

== Family ==
Nicholl was married with two children; his daughter Mary-Anne was also an artist.

== Legacy ==
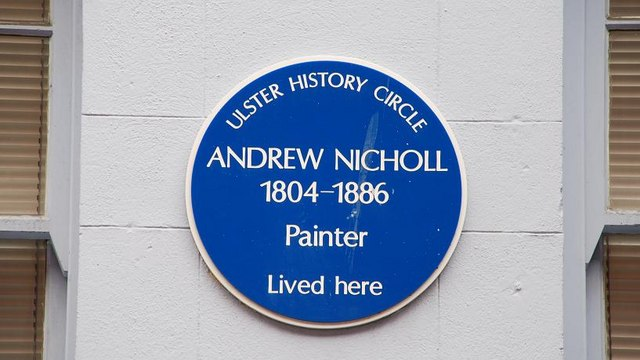
Blue plaque at Nicholl's birthplace

Queen Victoria purchased several of his drawings in 1858 and 1870. The Ulster Museum has a collection of about 380 of his watercolours and drawings. A book containing brief biographical details and reproductions of Nicholl's 1828 paintings of the Antrim coast was privately published by the Glens of Antrim Historical Society in about 1983.

== See also ==
- List of Northern Irish artists
