= Joseph R. Fisher (author) =

Northern Irish lawyer and newspaper editor

Joseph Robert Fisher B.L.
- Born: 1855; Raffrey, County Down, Ireland
- Died: 26 October 1939 (aged 83–84); Hampstead, London
- Education: Royal Belfast Academical Institution; Queen's University of Ireland (B.A.)
- Occupations: Newspaper editor, barrister, writer
- Writing career
- Notable works: Finland and the Tsars; Law of the Press

Joseph Robert Fisher (1855 – 26 October 1939) was a barrister, a newspaper editor, and an author from Ulster. Fisher alternated his career between working as a journalist at London daily newspapers, legal practice at the English Bar, editing Belfast's liberal unionist daily newspaper, and authoring books on subjects such as Irish and European politics and press law. Fisher's most prominent role was his appointment as the Unionist commissioner on the Irish Boundary Commission, the body established under the 1921 Anglo-Irish Treaty to decide on the delineation of the border between the Irish Free State and Northern Ireland.

== Early life and career ==
Fisher was born in Raffrey, County Down, Ireland in 1855, a younger son of clergyman Ringland Fisher, minister of the local Presbyterian church. He was educated at Royal Belfast Academical Institution, Belfast, and Queen's University, Galway, graduating with a B.A. in 1876. Fisher was foreign editor of the London Daily Chronicle until 1881 and assistant editor of the London Evening Standard thereafter. He was called to the Bar at a relatively late age in 1888, and practised until 1900, when he returned to Belfast. In early 1900, Fisher became editor of the Northern Whig, a liberal unionist daily paper, and remained in that position until the First World War.

== Irish Boundary Commission ==
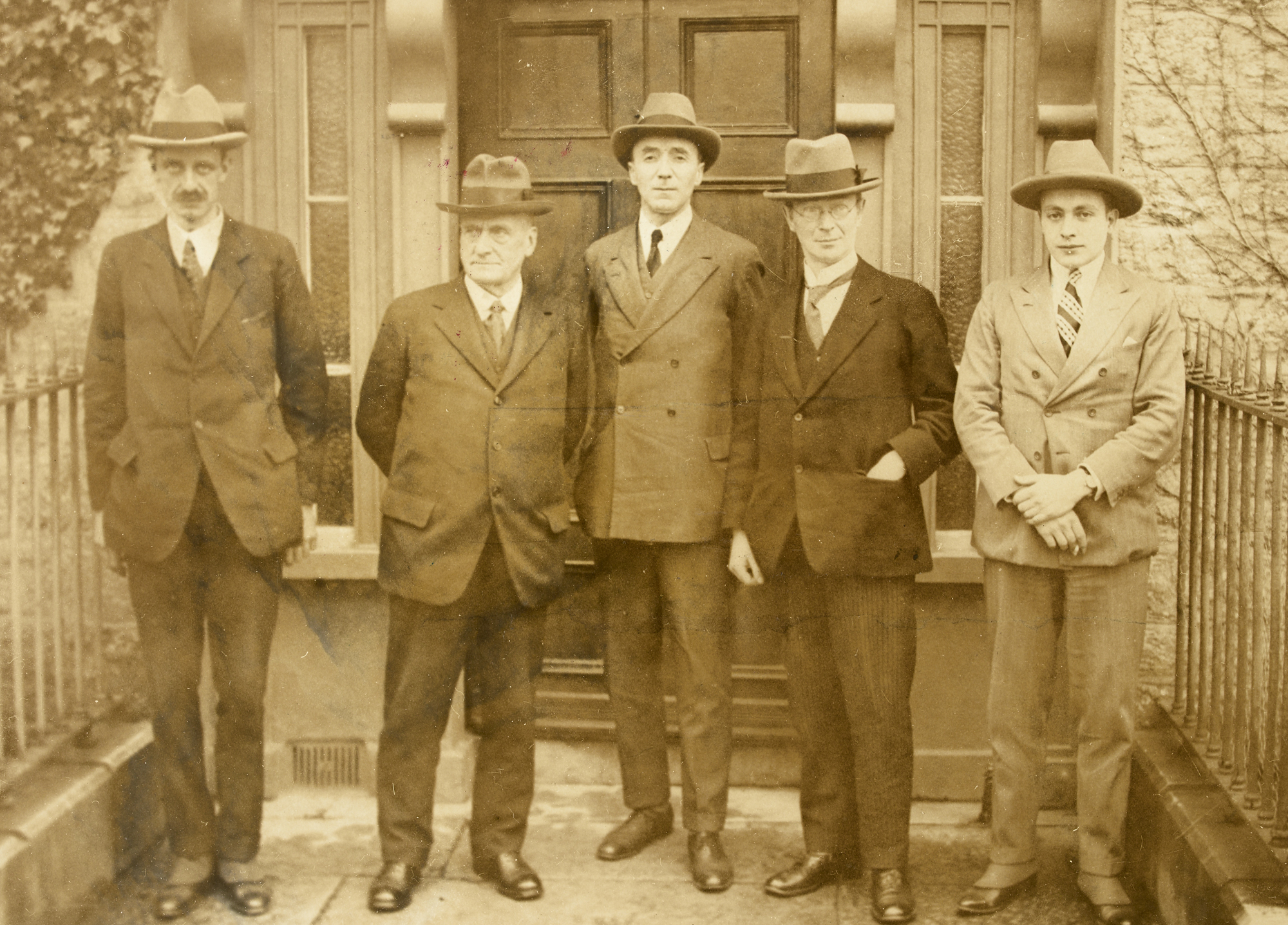
Joseph R. Fisher (second from left) at the Irish Boundary Commission's first sitting in Ireland, 11 December 1924.

The Government of Ireland Act 1920 was intended to produce a lasting solution to the demands of Irish nationalist leaders for political autonomy, known as "Home Rule", by giving Ireland limited regional self-government within the United Kingdom of Great Britain and Ireland. The Act provided for separate self-governing parliaments for Northern Ireland and Southern Ireland, with both remaining within the United Kingdom and both parliaments being subordinate to the Westminster parliament. The parliament and governmental institutions for Northern Ireland were soon established, but the overwhelming majority of MPs returned in the election in the 26 counties gave their allegiance to Dáil Éireann, unrecognised by the British government, thus rendering "Southern Ireland" moot as a political entity and leading to an intensification of the Irish War of Independence.

The Anglo-Irish Treaty that ended the war in January 1922 and the laws that implemented the treaty established a new Irish Free State in place of "Southern Ireland" and allowed Northern Ireland to opt out of the new Free State. The Houses of the Parliament of Northern Ireland duly did so on 7 December 1922, the day after the establishment of the Irish Free State, thus partitioning Ireland.

The Anglo-Irish Treaty stated that if Northern Ireland elected not to join the Free State, the interim border between the two states would be the existing boundary between Northern Ireland and Southern Ireland: the county boundaries between the six North-Eastern counties and the rest of the island. Article 12 of the Treaty contained a provision establishing a boundary commission that would determine the permanent boundary. The Treaty further stipulated that the commission was to have three members. The governments of the United Kingdom, of the Irish Free State and of Northern Ireland were to nominate one member each to the commission.

The leaders in the Free State, both supporting and opposing the treaty, assumed that the commission would award largely-nationalist areas such as County Fermanagh, County Tyrone, South Londonderry, South Armagh and South Down, and the City of Derry to the Free State and that the remnant of Northern Ireland would not be economically viable and would eventually opt for union with the rest of the island. The Ulster Unionist government of Northern Ireland, however, refused to appoint the commissioner required of it, wishing to concede "not one inch" of the territory of the six parliamentary counties that had seceded.

The Labour government in Great Britain and the Irish Free State government legislated to allow the British government to impose a representative on behalf of the Unionists. Fisher had a reputation of being a staunch but liberal unionist, and Ramsay MacDonald announced Fisher's appointment on 18 October 1924. He was to work with two other commissioners, Richard Feetham and Eoin MacNeill.

== Agreement on Irish Border ==
The three commissioners set to work and spent most of 1925 visiting communities near the six-county border, taking written statements and conducting "in camera" verbal hearings. The British government's commissioner, Richard Feetham, interpreted the commission's mandate narrowly and so with Fisher's Unionist vote, there was a two-to-one majority for only minor changes to the border. On 7 November 1925, an English conservative newspaper, The Morning Post, published leaked notes of the negotiations, including a draft map that suggested that parts of east Donegal would be transferred to Northern Ireland. That was seen as a grave embarrassment in Dublin.

According to the Oxford Dictionary of National Biography, Fisher was responsible for the leak. Fisher had told Florence Reid, the wife of D. D. Reid, M.P., the leader of the Ulster Unionists in the Westminster parliament, that the report would make no major changes. Fisher had also written to Edward Carson, former leader of the Irish Unionist Alliance, assuring him that Carson's 'handiwork' in creating Northern Irish state would survive. Irish government ministers suspected Fisher of being the source, Fisher being a Unionist newspaperman.

The press leak, whether or not by Fisher, effectively ended the Commission's work. The Irish government's commissioner, Eoin MacNeill, resigned two weeks later on 20 November, though Fisher and Feetham, the remaining commissioners, continued their work without MacNeill.

The leak and resignation caused the boundary negotiations to be swept into a wider agreement, concluded on 3 December 1925 between the British and Irish governments. The publication of the Commission's award would have an immediate legal effect and so before that could occur, the Free State government entered into talks with the British and Northern Ireland governments. Further, the Irish Free State's trade deficit was growing and was unable to meet existing levels of social spending, but the Free State was also faced with obligations under Article 5 of the Treaty to pay a pro-rata share of the public debt of the United Kingdom.

The Conservative government that had replaced Ramsay MacDonald's short Labour-Liberal coalition wanted to avoid Irish disputes.

The December agreement resolved the financial obligations of the Treaty in exchange for leaving the border unchanged. Early that evening, Fisher and Feetham were briefed by the three prime ministers together with Winston Churchill, as Chancellor of the Exchequer. The two remaining commissioners expressed their view of the problems that would result from a failure to adjust what they saw as the border's more absurd anomalies, particularly Protestant east Donegal (for which "Derry was the market town"); Pettigo and Belleek, County Fermanagh (both of which straddled the border); and the Drummully and Clones areas of County Monaghan, parts of which were accessible by road only from Northern Ireland. The politicians requested of the commissioners that the report be "burned or buried". The inter-governmental discussion about suppressing the report, and the report itself remained a secret until 1969. Ultimately, the agreement to make no changes was concluded by the three governments and the Commission rubber-stamped it. The publication or not of the Commission's report became a legal irrelevance but has always remained controversial.

== Later life ==
Aged 70 at the end of the Commission's work, Fisher retired to London; his address was in barristers' chambers in Essex Court, Middle Temple. He died, unmarried, on 26 October 1939 at 12 Lancaster Drive, Hampstead, close to the Swiss Cottage Tube station.

== Books and other publications ==
- "Law of the Press" (in part; with J. A. Strahan) (1891). London: William Clowes and Sons.
- "Finland and the Tsars" (1899). London: Edward Arnold.
- "The End of the Irish Parliament" (1911). London: Edward Arnold.
- "Finland" in The Encyclopædia Britannica (11th ed.), 1911 (in part; with Peter Alexeivitch Kropotkin and John Scott Keltie)
