= Northern Whig =

Irish newspaper

- Type: Daily newspaper (from 1858)
- Founder: Francis Dalzell Finlay
- Founded: 1824
- Ceased publication: 1963
- Political alignment: Whiggism; Liberal; Unionist
- Language: English
- Headquarters: Belfast

The Northern Whig (from 1919 the Northern Whig and Belfast Post) was a daily regional newspaper in Ireland which was first published in 1824 in Belfast when it was founded by Francis Dalzell Finlay. It was published twice weekly, Monday and Thursday, until 1849 when it increased publication to three days a week, Tuesday, Thursday, and Saturday. F.D. Finlay died in 1857 leaving the paper to his younger son also called Francis Dalzell Finlay. In 1858, The Northern Whig became a daily paper. In 1874 the paper became a limited company and it was sold to John Arnott, who owned the Irish Times, for £17,500. He disposed of it following an attack on Catholics. Samuel Cunningham became Chairman of the paper, and the family owned throughout the 20th century until its demise in 1963, after the second world war James Glencairn Cunningham became the owner and managing editor of the paper.

In its early years the paper as its editor and owner Finlay was in favour of Catholic Emancipation and supported the disestablishment of the Church of Ireland.

Its editorial line was liberal and unionist and it was seen as reflecting a Presbyterian slant on the news. Among its most notable editors was Joseph R. Fisher, B.L., from 1891 to 1913, who was in 1924 appointed Unionist commissioner of the Irish Boundary Commission.

The company changed its name to Northern Whig and Belfast Post in 1919. Three years later The Northern Whig moved to new premises on Bridge Street, where it remained until the paper ceased in 1963. These were damaged during the Belfast Blitz on 15 April 1941, when Bridge Street was almost decimated by the Luftwaffe. On Thursday, 17 April 1941, the paper reported, ‘A heavy death roll, possibly 200, is expected as a result of yesterday morning’s German air raid on Northern Ireland. Residential districts in Belfast were the main targets, and sections of the city far removed from military objectives were laid in ruins’. From 1963 until 1997 the building housed offices. In 1997, the building was renovated and turned into a pub, The Northern Whig.

The artist Andrew Nicholl apprenticed with F.D. Finlay, and worked for the Northern Whig. James Simms was editor of the paper in its early days, who left in 1851 to find The Mercury.

Following the demise of the newspaper in 1964, the company survived as The Northern Whig printing company. It went into administration in 2012 with the loss of 17 jobs.
