= Midland Counties Trades Federation =

The Midland Counties Trades Federation was a trade union federation bringing together unions involved in engineering in the West Midlands of England.

== History ==
Richard Juggins was the general secretary of the National Amalgamated Association of Nut and Bolt Makers, the only full-time trade union official in the engineering industry in the West Midlands. As a result, he was often asked to represent the local engineering unions as a whole, and he decided that they should form a loose federation to organise this co-operation.

In March 1886, Juggins organised meetings in Smethwick and Darlaston to promote his idea, and delegates unanimously approved it. As a result, it was established on 12 May 1886, sharing headquarters in Darlaston with the Nut and Bolt Makers. The other founding unions were the Dudley Anvil Makers, and the Walsall Chain Makers. By the end of the year, its affiliates represented 1,000 members, but five years later, this had grown to 14,000 members in 66 unions.

The federation supported a strike by the chain makers over the winter of 1886 and 1887, and although its aims were not achieved, affiliates believed that the support of the federation had aided recruitment and would result in longer-term benefits. The union also achieved wage increases for several local industries, and from 1889, wage boards were created in many of them. Membership of the federation slumped to only 4,000 in 1894, but then grew again to a peak of 19,500 in 1900, at which time, it had 45 affiliates.

The federation considered sponsoring Juggins as a Liberal-Labour candidate for Dudley at the 1892 UK general election, but affiliates were divided on the merits of the idea, so he did not go forward. In later years, it engaged more closely with Parliamentarians, and leaders including general secretary John Taylor, president William Millerchip, and chain makers' leader Tom Sitch, all became prominent local councillors, but without formal backing from the federation. It attended the founding conference of the Labour Representation Committee, and in 1903, Taylor was asked to stand for the new party, but again, he was unable to secure the federation's backing and so declined.

In the 20th-century, membership of the federation fell away, as employment in the relevant industries dropped, and many affiliates merged into large unions. In addition, the federation did not cover the increasingly prevalent machine workers, who were seen as unskilled, and instead joined general unions, nor did it attempt to organise women, who were represented by the National Federation of Women Workers. While membership rose around World War I, it then declined again. The federation was finally dissolved in about 1941.

== General Secretaries ==
1886: Richard Juggins
1901: John Taylor
