= John Taylor (trade unionist) =

British trade unionist and politician

- Born: 1861/1862
- Died: 4 April 1942
- Occupations: Trade unionist, politician

John Taylor OBE (1861 or 1862 – 4 April 1942) was a British trade unionist and politician.

Based in the West Midlands, Taylor came to prominence as secretary of the Anvil and Vice Trade Association, and also of the Nut and Bolt Association. In 1895, he was elected as general secretary of the Midland Counties Trades Federation (MCTF). He rebuilt the federation's membership, from 4,000, to 14,000 by 1900. He took the federation into the new General Federation of Trade Unions, sitting on its executive committee until 1920.

Taylor represented the MCTF at the founding conference of the Labour Representation Committee (LRC). He was elected as a local councillor, and in 1903, he was asked to stand as an LRC Parliamentary candidate in Dudley, at the next general election. However, he was unable to secure the support of the MCTF, and so decided not to stand.

Membership of the MCTF, and the Anvil and Vice, and Nut and Bolt associations, declined in the 20th-century, along with employment in the industry, and Taylor was not interested in expanding membership by recruiting women or machine workers. In the 1918 Birthday Honours, he was made an Officer of the Order of the British Empire, at which time, he was president of Dudley Trades Council. He remained in his trade union posts until his death, in 1942.

Trade union offices
Preceded by Richard Juggins	General Secretary of the Midland Counties Trades Federation; 1895–1942	Federation dissolved
