= Arthur Rumboll =

English cricketer, railwayman, and soldier

Personal information
- Full name: Arthur Charles Rumboll
- Born: 20 August 1869; West Grimstead, Wiltshire, England
- Died: 31 July 1935 (aged 65); Weybridge, Surrey, England
- Batting: Unknown

Domestic team information
- Years: Team
- 1901/02: Europeans

Career statistics
Competition	First-class
Matches	1
Runs scored	17
Batting average	8.50
100s/50s	–/–
Top score	12
Catches/stumpings	1/–
- Source: Cricinfo, 2 January 2024

Arthur Charles Rumboll OBE CIE (20 August 1869 – 31 July 1935) was an English first-class cricketer and a figure in the Great Indian Peninsula Railway.

The son of Charles Large Rumboll, was born in August 1869 at West Grimstead, Wiltshire. Rumboll worked for the railways in British India, beginning his career with the Indian Midland Railway and gaining a military commission in the Midland Railway Volunteer Rifles as a second lieutenant in April 1892, with promotion to lieutenant following in October 1894. A further promotion to captain followed in July 1898, The Indian Midland Railway was succeeded by the Great Indian Peninsula Railway in Bombay, for whom Rumboll was a deputy manager. He was made an OBE in the 1918 Birthday Honours, at which point he held the position of general traffic manager with the railway. In the 1921 New Year Honours, he was appointed a Companion of the Order of the Indian Empire, holding the position of acting agent with the railway.

While in India, Rumboll played first-class cricket for the Europeans cricket team, making a single appearance against the Parsees at Bombay in the 1901–02 Bombay Presidency Match. Batting twice in the match, he was dismissed for 12 runs in the Europeans first innings by Kekhashru Mistry, while in their second innings he was dismissed for 5 runs by Ardeshir Mehta. Rumboll later retired to England, where he died at Weybridge in July 1935.
