= John Green (agriculturalist) =

British agriculturalist (1862–1953)

Sir John Little Green OBE (6 September 1862 – 15 January 1953) was a British agriculturalist described in his Times obituary as a "champion of rural workers, both on the farm and in rural industries". He was secretary of the Rural Labourers' League for 32 years and editor of its organ, The Rural World.

He was appointed an Officer of the Order of the British Empire in the 1918 Birthday Honours and knighted in 1919.
