= Archie Douglas =

English cricketer

Archibald Philip Douglas (7 June 1867 – 24 January 1953) was an English first-class cricketer active 1887–1912 who played for Middlesex and Surrey in England; and in India for the Europeans. He was born in Norwood Green, Middlesex; died in Taunton.
