= Duncan Vines =

English cricketer and Royal Indian Navy officer

Personal information
- Full name: Duncan Frederick Vines
- Born: 1869; Agra, North-Western Provinces, British India
- Died: 7 March 1950 (aged 80/81); Tunbridge Wells, Kent, England
- Batting: Unknown

Domestic team information
- Years: Team
- 1897/98–1908/09: Europeans (India)
- 1899–1901: Monmouthshire

Career statistics
| Competition | First-class |
|---|---|
| Matches | 3 |
| Runs scored | 38 |
| Batting average | 7.60 |
| 100s/50s | –/– |
| Top score | 21 |
| Balls bowled | 0 |
| Wickets | – |
| Bowling average | – |
| 5 wickets in innings | – |
| 10 wickets in match | – |
| Best bowling | – |
| Catches/stumpings | 3/– |
- Source: ESPNcricinfo, 19 December 2018

Duncan Frederick Vines CBE (1869 – 7 March 1950), was an English first-class cricketer and Royal Indian Navy officer.

Born at Agra, Vines was an officer in the Royal Indian Navy. He made his debut in first-class cricket while serving in British India, playing for the Europeans against the Parsees at Bombay in August 1897. He played cricket in Wales in 1899, playing four matches for Monmouthshire in the 1899 Minor Counties Championship, with Vines appearing once more for Monmouthshire in 1901. His service in the Royal Indian Navy returned him to British India at some point after these matches, where he played two further first-class matches for the Europeans in September 1908 against the Parsees and the Hindus. He batted in six innings across his three first-class matches, scoring 38 runs with a high score of 21. He held the rank of Captain in June 1918, serving as a port officer in Calcutta. He was made a CBE in the 1918 Birthday Honours. Vines was placed on the retired list in March 1935. He died in England at Tunbridge Wells in March 1950.
