= Francis Dalzell Finlay =

- Born: 12 July 1793
- Died: 10 September 1857 (aged 64)
- Occupations: Journalist, Printer
- Known for: Founding The Northern Whig
- Spouse: Marieanne Porter
- Children: William Porter Finlay; Francis Dalzell Finlay; Sinclair Finlay; George Washington Finlay; Mary Finlay; Jane Dalzell Finlay
- Parents: John Finlay (father); Jane Dalzell (mother)

Francis Dalzell Finlay (12 July 1793 – 10 September 1857) was an Irish journalist.

Finlay was the son of John Finlay, tenant farmer, of Newtownards, County Down, by his wife, Jane Dalzell, was born 12 July 1793 at Newtownards, and began life as a printer's apprentice in Belfast, where he started as a master printer in 1820. The letterpress which issued from his works was distinguished by both accuracy and elegance, being far superior to any that had previously been produced in Ireland.

== Journalism career ==
In 1824 he founded the 'Northern Whig.' Liberalism being then a very unpopular creed in Ulster, Finlay was frequently prosecuted for press offences. On 21 July 1826 he was indicted for publishing in the 'Northern Whig' a libel tending to bring into disrepute the character of a certain 'improving' landlord. The libel consisted in a letter purporting to be by a small farmer in which the improvements alleged to have been effected by the landlord in question were denied to be improvements at all, and in which a character for litigiousness was imputed to the landlord. Finlay was sentenced to three months' imprisonment, without the option of a fine, and the publication of the 'Northern Whig' was suspended from August 1826 until May 1827.

From the first Finlay advocated the emancipation of the Roman Catholics, and it was in the columns of the 'Northern Whig' that William Sharman Crawford propounded his celebrated views on tenant-right. Some comments in the 'Northern Whig' on the conduct of Lord Hertford's agent led to another prosecution for libel in 1830, which, however, was abandoned when it transpired that Daniel O'Connell had volunteered for the defence. On a similar charge he was found guilty on 23 July 1832 and sentenced to three months' imprisonment and fined 50l. In spite, however, of these proceedings, the 'Northern Whig' continued from time to time to give expression to similar views which were adjudged libellous and occasioned its proprietor very heavy legal expenditure. To the extension of the suffrage, the disestablishment of the Irish church, and the reform of the land laws Finlay through his paper gave a steady and zealous support; but, though a personal friend of O'Connell, he opposed the movement for the repeal of the union and the later developments of Irish disaffection, such as the Young Irelandism of Mitchell and the agitation which resulted in the abortive insurrection of Smith O'Brien.

The Finlay family entertained the famous author Mark Twain when he visited Ulster.

== Death ==
He died on 10 September 1857, bequeathing his paper to his younger son, Francis Dalzell Finlay, by whom it was conducted until 1874, when it was transferred to a limited company. Finlay married in 1830 Marianne, daughter of the Rev. William Porter, presbyterian minister, of Newtonlimavady, County Londonderry, his elder son was named William Porter Finlay. Finlay is buried in Clifton Street Cemetery, Belfast.
