= Neotu Gallery =

Furniture gallery in Paris, France

Galerie Néotù
- Founded: 1984
- Founders: Gérard Dalmon and Pierre Staudenmeyer
- Type: Art gallery
- Headquarters: Paris, France

Néotù was a Paris-based gallery dedicated to collectible contemporary furniture and design, founded in 1984 by Gérard Dalmon and Pierre Staudenmeyer.

Through its galleries in Paris and later New York, opened in 1990, Néotù played a significant role in the emergence of French collectible design during the 1980s and 1990s, presenting works by designers, architects and artists in limited editions and unique pieces.

Founded by Gérard Dalmon, then a consultant at Cap Gemini, and marketing consultant Pierre Staudenmeyer, the gallery was first located on rue de Verneuil before moving to rue du Renard in 1985.

Néotù became known for promoting experimental approaches to furniture and decorative arts, contributing to the international recognition of designers including Martin Szekely, Garouste & Bonetti, Pucci De Rossi, Ron Arad, Jasper Morrison, Matali Crasset and Zaha Hadid.

In addition to exhibiting contemporary design, the gallery collaborated in the production and editing of furniture and objects, supporting emerging designers whose work later became influential within international design history.

In 1992, Galerie Néotù began representing VIA (the French furniture association) in the United States.

Néotù closed in 2001. Pierre Staudenmeyer subsequently founded Mouvements Modernes in Paris in 2002.

== Legacy ==
Following the closure of Galerie Néotù in 2001, Pierre Staudenmeyer founded Mouvements Modernes in Paris in 2002.

Focused on collectible and contemporary design, the gallery presents historical works from the 1980s and 1990s alongside contemporary artists, designers and architects.

Since 2008, Mouvements Modernes has been directed by Sophie Mainier-Jullerot.

The gallery preserves the archives of Néotù and organizes exhibitions related to the history of decorative arts and contemporary design.

== Designers ==
Galerie Néotù exhibited and occasionally produced works by designers, architects and artists.

- Ron Arad
- Emmanuel Babled
- François Bauchet
- Vincent Bécheau & Marie-Laure Bourgeois
- Eric Benqué
- Christian Biecher
- Constantin Boym
- Ronan & Erwan Bouroullec
- Andrea Branzi
- Stephen Burks
- Tom Dixon
- André Dubreuil
- Sylvain Dubuisson
- Dan Friedman (graphic designer)
- Olivier Gagnère
- Adrien Gardère
- Élisabeth Garouste & Mattia Bonetti
- Jean-Paul Gaultier
- Christian Ghion
- Zaha Hadid
- Massimo Iosa Ghini
- Michael Graves
- Jasper Morrison
- Patrick Naggar
- Gaetano Pesce
- Christophe Pillet
- Pucci De Rossi
- Eric Schmitt
- Borek Sipek
- Ettore Sottsass
- Martin Szekely
- Nanda Vigo
- Michael Young

== Exhibitions ==
=== Exhibitions at Galerie Néotù, Paris ===
- 1985 March - "Collection PI' - Martin Szekely
- 1985 April June - "Onze Lampes" - Emmanuelle Colboc, Sylvain Dubuisson, Gérard Dalmon, Olivier Gagnère, Elizabeth Garouste & Mattia Bonetti, Kevin Gray, Philippe Nogen, Pucci de Rossi, Martin Szekely, Jérome Thermopyles, Olivier Thomé - Catalogue "Onze Lampes" - Publisher Galerie Neotu
- 1985 November December - "La Conversation" - Chairs by François Bauchet, Bécheau-Bourgeois, Gérard Dalmon, Epinard bleu, Olivier Gagnère, Elizabeth Garouste & Mattia Bonetti, Augustin Granet, Mary Little, Pucci de Rossi, Martin Szekely
- 1986 September November - "English Eccentrics" - Ron Arad, André Dubreuil, Tom Dixon, Sue Golden, Jasper Morrisson, John Webb
- 1987 September October - "Ceramics from 1955 to 1959" - Franco Meneguzzo
- 1992 April May - "April in Paris" - Constantin Boym, David Capogna, Lyn Godley & Lloyd Schwan, Douglas Fitch, Paul Ludick, Ali Tayar
- 1992 October November - "Colour Comedies ceramics" - Garouste & bonetti, Michael Graves, Zaha Hadid, Atsushi Kitagawara, Jo Laubner, Ettore Sottsass - made by the Waechtersbacher Keramik Workshop
- 1992 November December - "Les fleurs du mal" - William Sawaya
- 1999 November December - "Inside Out" - Christian Ghion
- 2000 January February - "BYOB: Bring Your Own Book" - Eric Benqué, Christian Biecher, Ronan & Erwan Bouroullec, Matali Crasset, Christian Ghion, Christophe Pillet
- 2000 June July - "GeoBio" - Elizabeth Garouste & Mattia Bonetti

==== Exhibitions at Neotu Gallery, New York ====
- 1990 September October - "Opening Exhibition" - Elisabeth Garouste & Matia Bonetti
- 1991 January February - "A Warriors Collection" - Ravage: Arnold van Geuns & Clemens Rameckers
- 1991 June July - "Green Pieces" - Dan Friedman
- 1991 September November - "Initials and other pieces" - Martin Szekely
- 1992 September November - "Mobile Furniture Collection" - Jean-Paul Gaultier
- 1992 November January - "Colour Comedies ceramics" - Elisabeth Garouste & Matia Bonetti, Michael Graves, Zaha Hadid, Atsushi Kitagawara, Jo Laubner, Ettore Sottsass - produites par Waechtersbacher Keramik Workshop
- 1993 March April - "A new furniture collection" - Elisabeth Garouste & Matia Bonetti
- 1993 April May - "Drawings, Objects & Furniture" - Sylvain Dubuisson
- 1993 May June - "A new furniture collection" - Lyn Godley & Lloyd Schawn

== Bibliography ==
=== Brochures ===
- 1985 - "Onze Lampes" - Publisher Galerie Néotù - Paris - 1985 See the brochure

=== References ===
- 1986 - "Le style des années 80" - Sophie Anargyros - Publisher Rivages/Style - Paris - 1986 - ISBN 2-86930-032-8
- 1987 - "The New Furniture: Trends + Traditions" - Peter Dormer - Publisher Thames and Hudson - New York - 1987 - ISBN 0-500-23492-2
- 1987 - "International Design Yearbook 3" - Philippe Starck - Publisher Abbeville Press - New York - 1987 - ISBN 0-89659-765-2
- 1998 - "Design aujourd'hui" - Christine Colin - Publisher Flammarion - Paris - 1988 - ISBN 2-08-012097-2
- 1988 - "MDF des créateurs pour un matériau : Exposition, Jouy-en-Josas, 24 avril-22 mai 1988" - Publisher Fondation Cartier - Paris - 1988 - ISBN 2-86925-019-3
- 1988 - "Berlin: les avant-gardes du mobilier : 6 Septembre-3 Octobre 1988, Galerie des Breves du CCI, Centre G. Pompidou, Galerie VIA, Galerie Néotù, Paris" - Angela Schönberger, Centre de création industrielle - Publisher Centre Pompidou - Paris - 1988
- 1990 - "Union des Arts Français" - New Art Fair '90 in Chicago - Publisher UAF - Paris/New York - 1990
- 1990 - "New Italian Design" - Nally Bellati - Publisher Rizzoli - New York - 1990 - ISBN 0-8478-1258-8
- 1991 - "Chicago International New Art Form" - Catalogue - Publisher Lakeside Group Inc. - Chicago - 1991
- 1992 - "International Design Yearbook 7' - Andrée Putman - Publisher Abbeville Press - New York - 1992 - ISBN 1-55859-285-7
- 1992 - "Sylvain Dubuisson" - Publisher AFAA - Paris - 1992 - ISBN 2-86545-094-5
- 1992 - "Colour Comedies" - Publisher Nieswand Verlag - Kiel - 1992 - ISBN 3-926048-90-5
- 1992 - "La France à l'Exposition universelle, Séville 1992: facettes d'une nation" - Régis Debray - Publisher Flammarion - Paris - 1992 - ISBN 2-08-035202-4
- 1993 - "International Design Yearbook 8' - Bořek Šípek - Publisher Abbeville Press - New York - 1993 - ISBN 1-55859-428-0
- 1994 - "International Design Yearbook 9' - Ron Arad - Publisher Abbeville Press - New York - 1994 - ISBN 1-55859-831-6
- 1994 - "The Design Encyclopedia" - Mel Byars - Publisher John Wiley & Sons - New York - 1994 - ISBN 0-471-02455-4
- 1995 - "Martin Szekely meublier-designer" - Brigitte Fitoussi, Didier Krzenowski, Pierre Staudenmeyer, Christian Schlatter - Publisher Hazan - Paris - 1995 - ISBN 2-86545-139-9
- 1995 - "Les années 80" - Anne Bony - Publisher Les Editions du Regard - Paris - 1995 - ISBN 2-84105-038-6
- 1996 - "International Design Yearbook 11' - Alexandro Mendini - Publisher Abbeville Press - New York - 1996 - ISBN 0-7892-0209-3
- 1998 - "Le Mobilier Francais: 1960-1998" - Yvonne Brunhammer & Marie-Laure Perrin - Publisher Charles Massin - Paris - 1998 - ISBN 2-7072-0338-6
- 1999 - "Inside Out" - Catalogue published for the exhibition of Christian Ghion at Neotu Gallery - Paris
- 2004 - "The Design Encyclopedia" - Mel Byars - Publisher Laurence King Publishing & The Museum of Modern Art - London & New York - 2004 - ISBN 0-87070-012-X
- 2007 - "Pierre Staudenmeyer et la Galerie Néotù" - AZIMUTS#29 - Constance Rubini - Publisher AZIMUTS, Cité du Design - Saint-Etienne - 2007 - ISBN 978-2-912808-07-3

=== Magazines ===
- 1984 - City Magazine International #3 - Société de Presse et d'Éditions - Genève - 1984
- 1993 - "Design Museum Map" - Axis #47 World Design Journal - Tokyo - 1993
- 2000 - "Salon du Meuble de Paris/Off event" - Axis #34 Design with a name - Tokyo - 2000
