= Arnold Genthe =

German-American photographer (1869–1942)

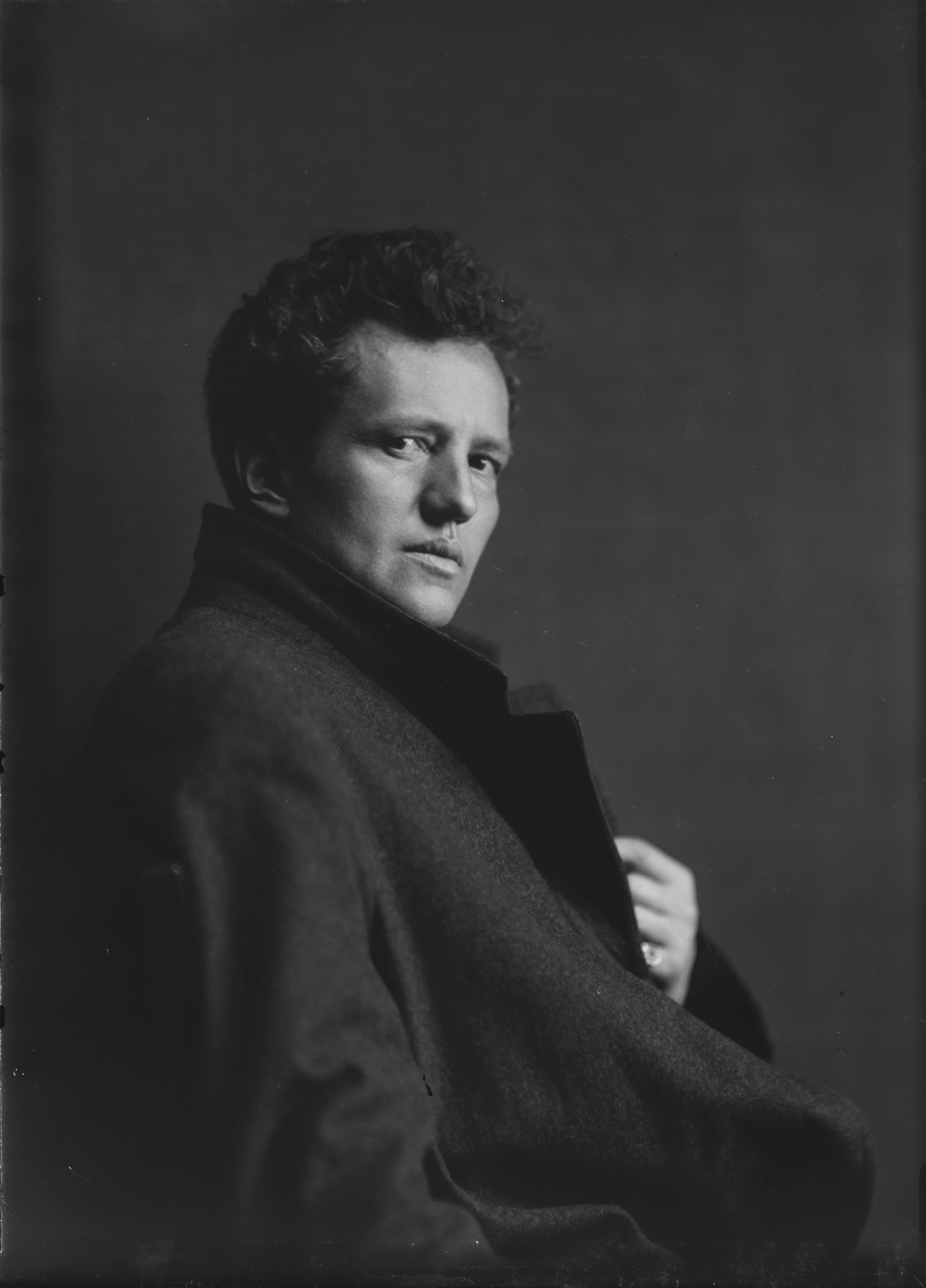
- Self-portrait, 1900
- Born: 8 January 1869; Berlin, Prussia
- Died: 9 August 1942 (aged 73); New York City, U.S.
- Occupations: Photographer; educator

Arnold Genthe (8 January 1869 – 9 August 1942) was a German-American photographer, best known for his photographs of Northern California, San Francisco's Chinatown, the 1906 San Francisco earthquake, and his portraits of noted people, from politicians and socialites to literary figures and entertainment celebrities.

== Biography ==
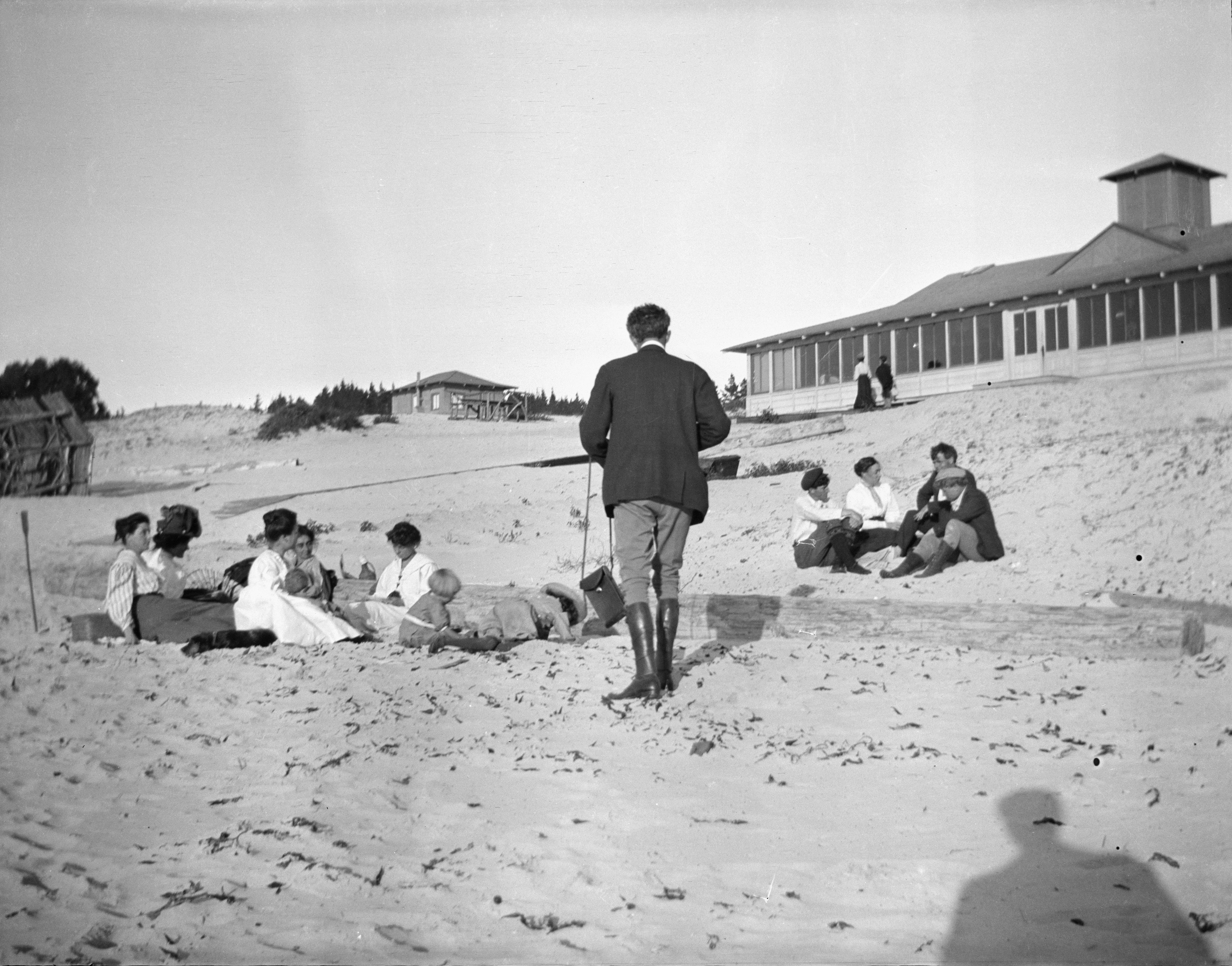
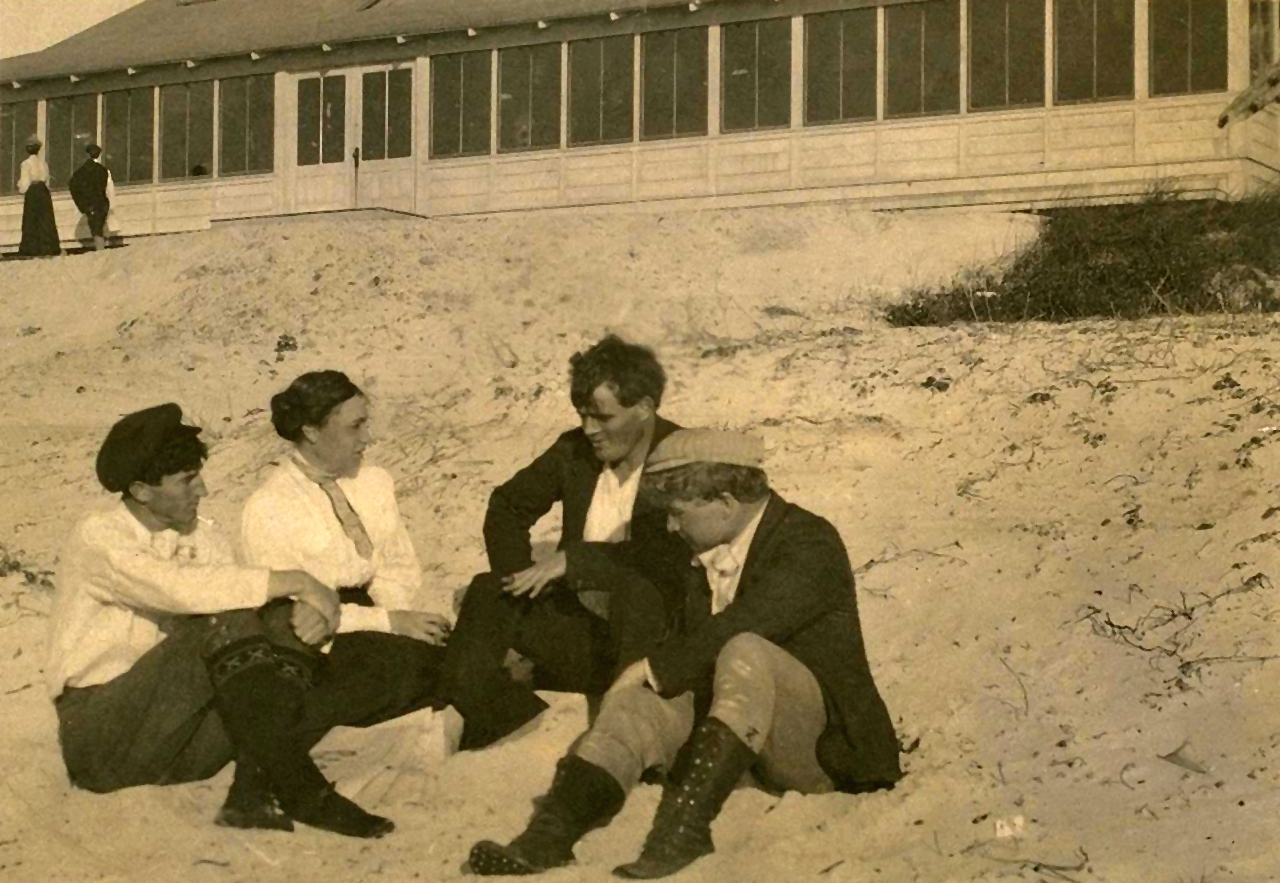
Left: Genthe photographing Jack London and friends in Carmel-by-the-Sea, California. Right: The resulting photograph.

Arnold Genthe was born in Berlin, Prussia, to Luise Zober and Hermann Genthe, a professor of Latin and Greek at the Graues Kloster (Grey Monastery) in Berlin. Genthe followed in his father's footsteps, becoming a classically trained scholar; he received a doctorate in philology in 1894 from the University of Jena, where he knew artist Adolph Menzel, his mother's cousin.

After immigrating to San Francisco in 1895 to work as a tutor for the son of Baron and Baroness J. Henrich von Schroeder, he taught himself photography. He was intrigued by the Chinese section of the city and photographed its inhabitants, from children to drug addicts. Due to his subjects' possible fear of his camera or their reluctance to have pictures taken, Genthe sometimes hid his camera. He also sometimes removed evidence of Western culture from these pictures, cropping or erasing as needed. About 200 of his Chinatown pictures survive, and these comprise the only known photographic depictions of the area before the 1906 earthquake.

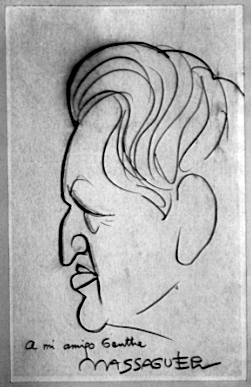
Caricature of Arnold Genthe by Cuban artist Conrado Massaguer

After local magazines published some of his photographs in the late 1890s, he opened a portrait studio. He knew some of the city's wealthy matrons, and as his reputation grew, his clientele included Nance O'Neil, Sarah Bernhardt, Nora May French, and Jack London. In 1904 he traveled to Western Europe and Tangier with the famous watercolorist, Francis McComas.

In 1906, the San Francisco earthquake and fire destroyed Genthe's studio, but he rebuilt. His photograph of the earthquake's aftermath, Looking Down Sacramento Street, San Francisco, April 18, 1906, is his most famous photograph.

Within a short time, Genthe joined the art colony in Carmel-by-the-Sea, where he fraternized with the literary elite, including George Sterling, Jack London, Harry Leon Wilson, Ambrose Bierce, and Mary Austin. Here he was able to pursue his work in color photography.

In 1906, Genthe designed the plans for his large Craftsman-style cottage located on Camino Real and 11th Avenue on the east side. Of his new residence, he wrote, "The cypresses and rocks of Point Lobos, the always varying sunsets and the intriguing shadows of the sand dunes offered a rich field for color experiments." During this time, he became one of the pioneers who experimented with autochrome photography.

Although his stay in Carmel was relatively short (1905–07), he was appointed in 1907 to the Board of Directors of the Art Gallery in Monterey's luxury Hotel Del Monte, where he ensured that the work of important regional art photographers, such as Laura Adams Armer and Anne Brigman, was displayed with his own prints.

By the spring of 1907 he had established his residence and studio at 3209 Clay Street in San Francisco, where he continued to enjoy membership in the celebrated Bohemian Club, attend prominent society functions, display his own work, and pen newspaper reviews of photo and art exhibitions.

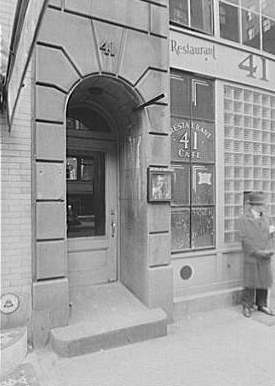
Arnold Genthe's studio at 41 E. 49th St., New York City

In 1911 he moved to New York City, where he remained until his death of a heart attack in 1942. He worked primarily in portraiture, and Theodore Roosevelt, Woodrow Wilson, and John D. Rockefeller all sat for him. His photos of Greta Garbo were credited with boosting her career. He also photographed dancers, including Anna Pavlova, Isadora Duncan, Audrey Munson, Helen Moller and Ruth St. Denis, and his photos were featured in the 1916 book, The Book of the Dance.

== Autochromes ==
Genthe was an early adopter of the autochrome color photography process. He began experimenting with the process in 1905 in Carmel, California. He claimed credit for the first exhibition of color photographs in America; later scholars determined this is not accurate, but he was undoubtedly one of the earliest. His subjects included portraits, artistic nudes, and landscapes.

== Genthe's cat ==
Genthe owned a cat called Buzzer. Buzzer often appeared in portraitures with Genthe's subjects, most notably Broadway actresses to whom the cat warmed. One such sitting in autochrome was with actress Ann Murdock.

== Gallery ==
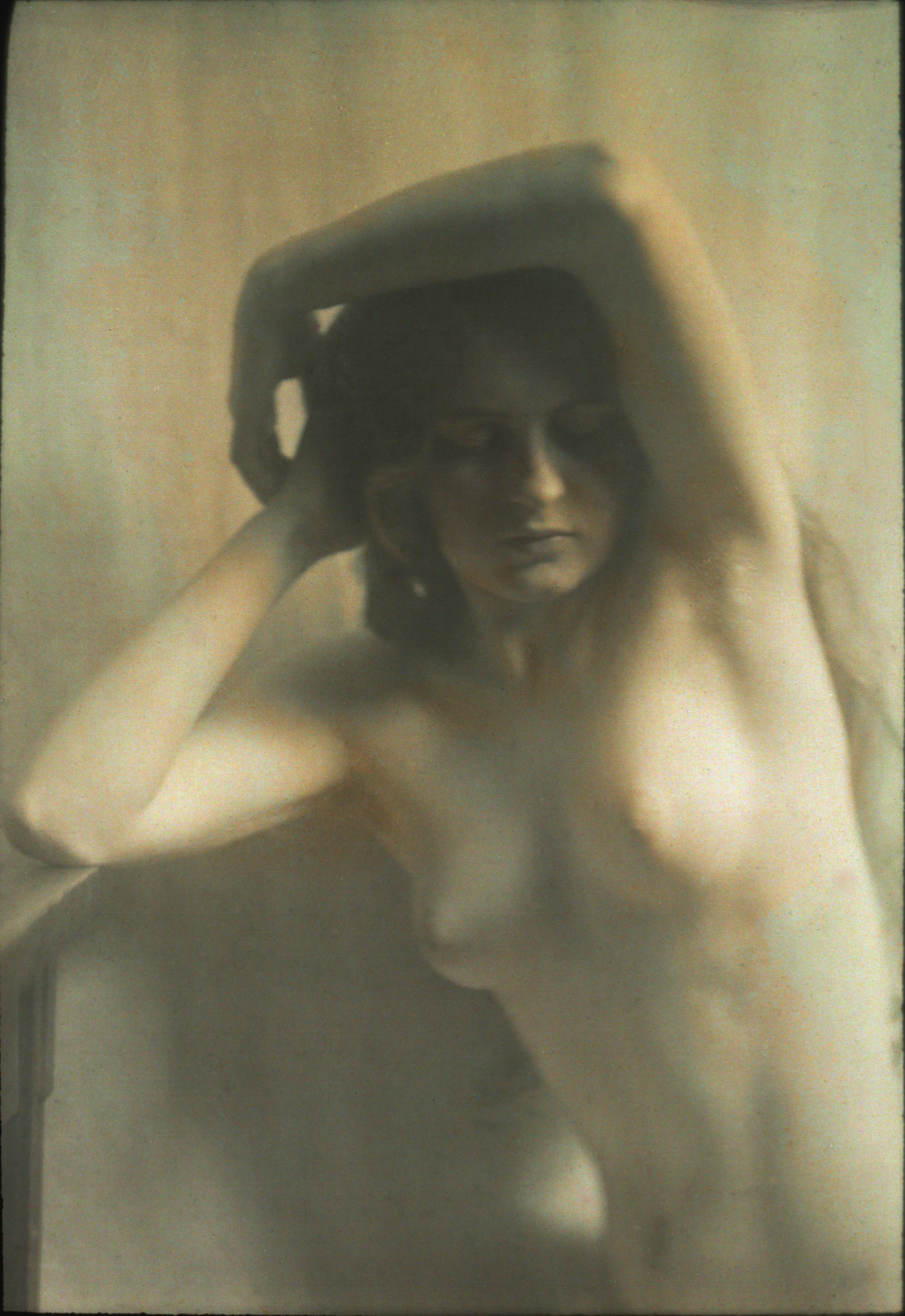
Autochrome nude study

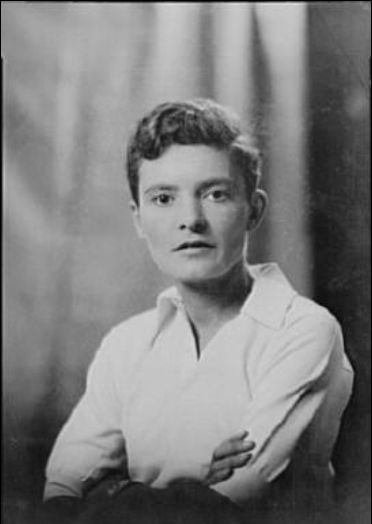
Alice DeLamar (1927)

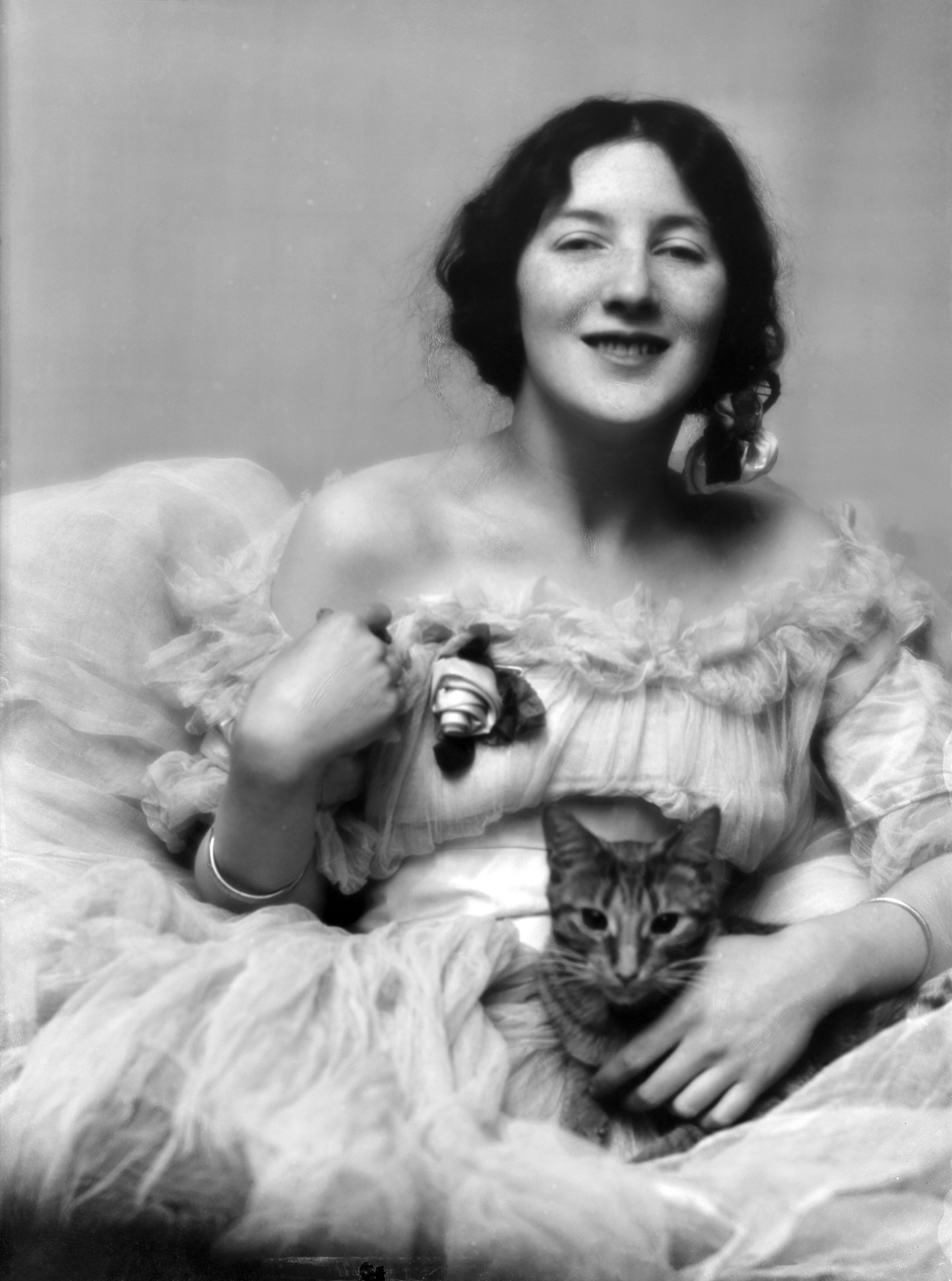
Audrey Munson with Genthe's cat, Buzzer (1915)

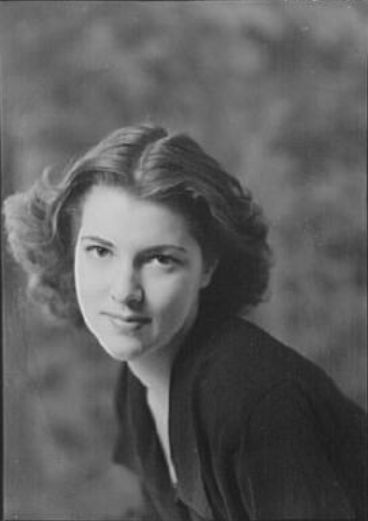
Diana Barrymore (1941)

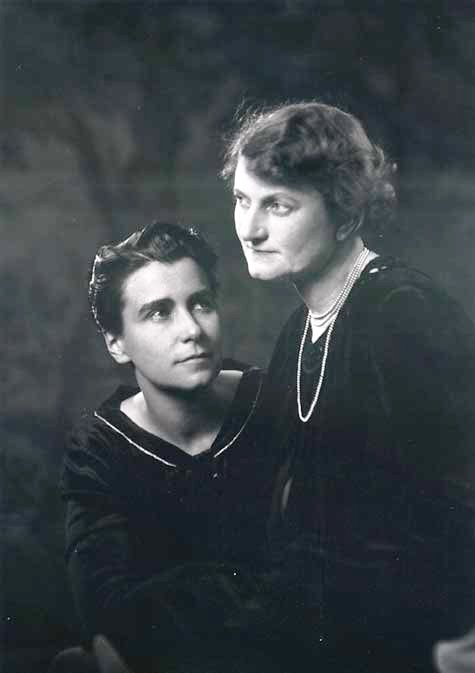
Miss Dorothy Arzner and Marion Morgan (1927)

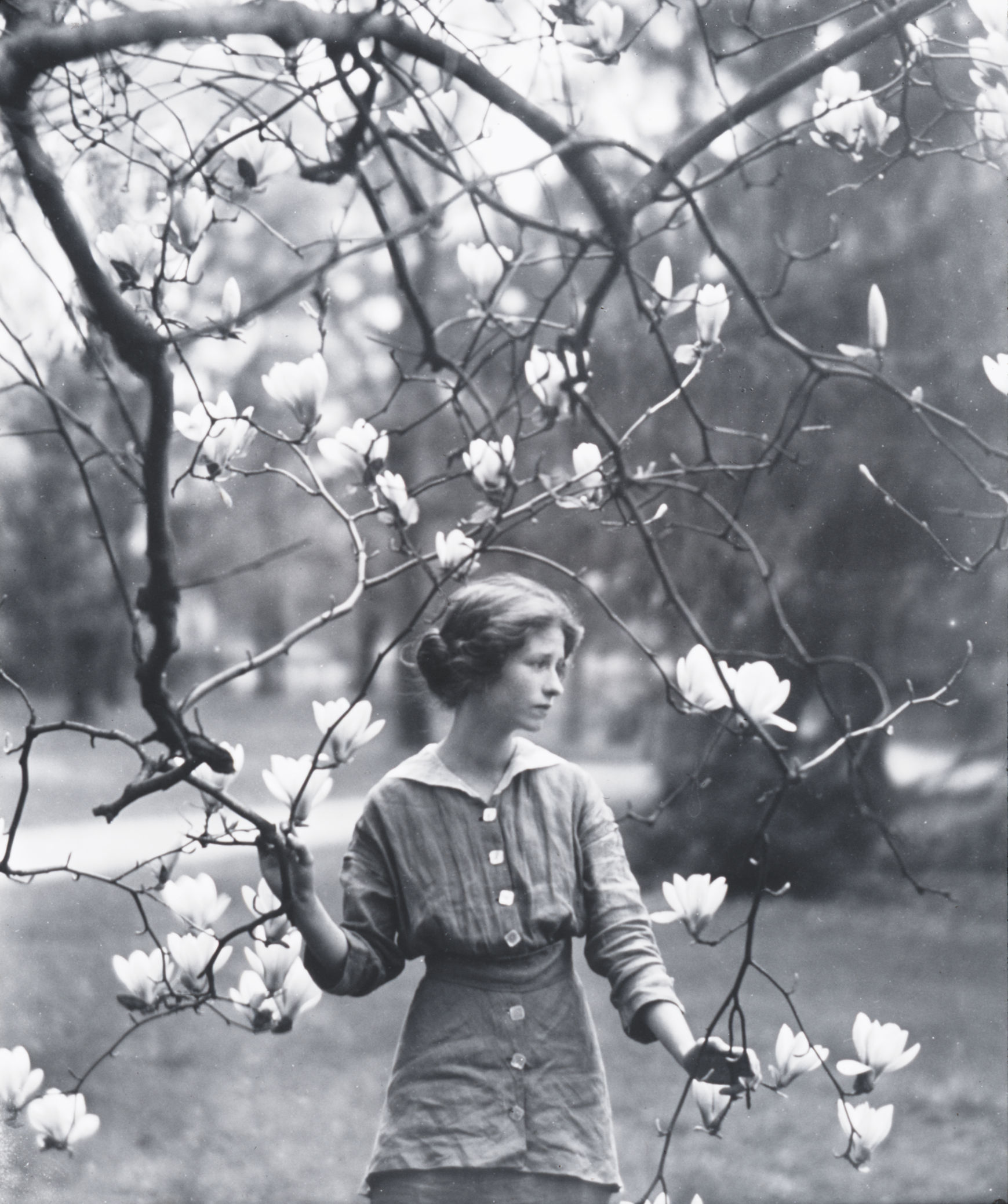
Edna St. Vincent Millay (1914)

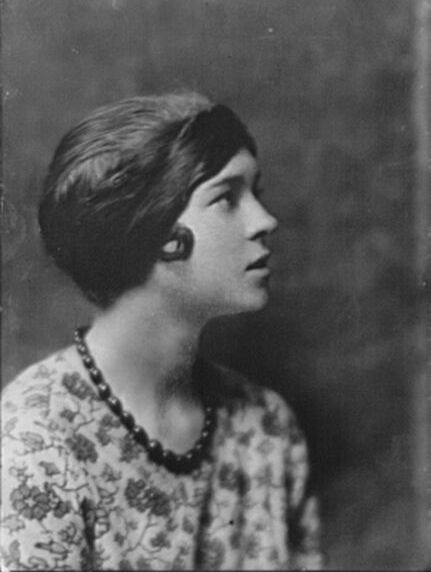
Eva Le Gallienne (not before 1916)

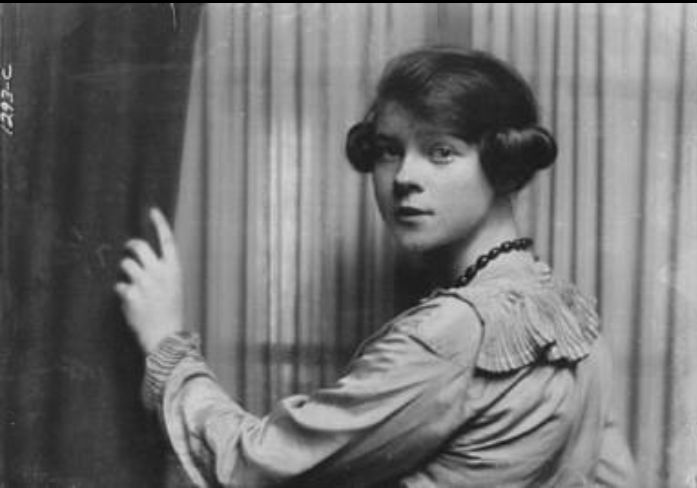
Eva Le Gallienne (not before 1916)

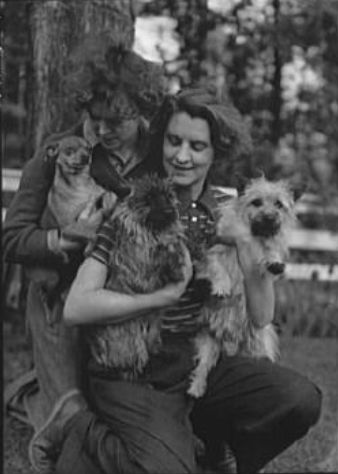
Eva Le Gallienne and unidentified woman (Marion Morgan?), with dogs (1937)

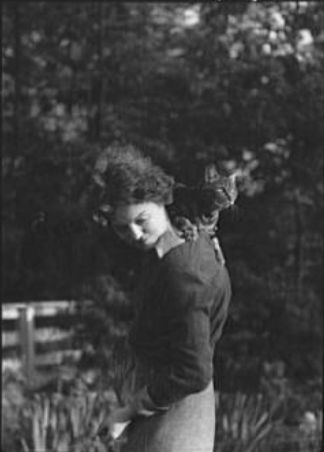
Eva Le Gallienne with cat (1937)

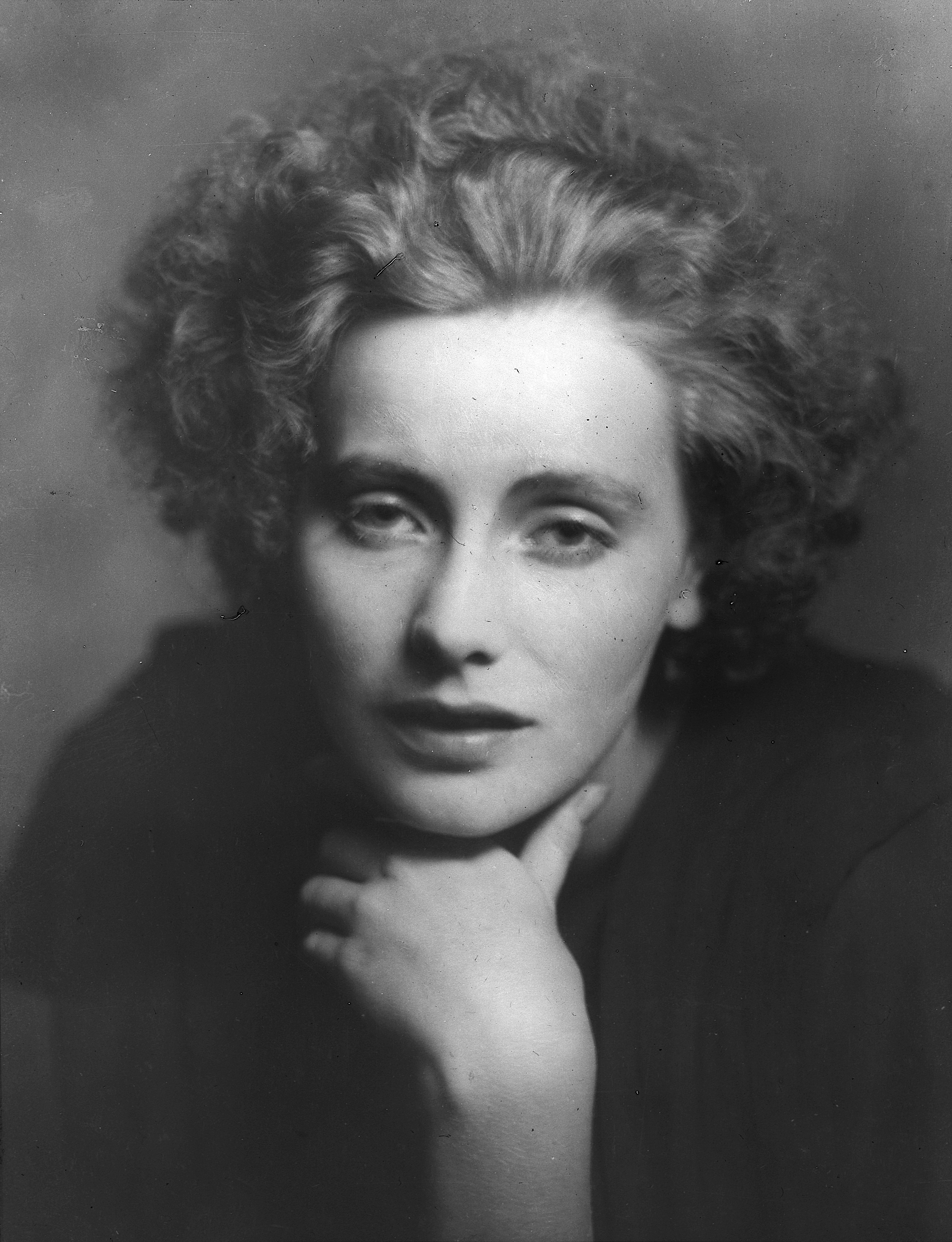
Greta Garbo (1925)

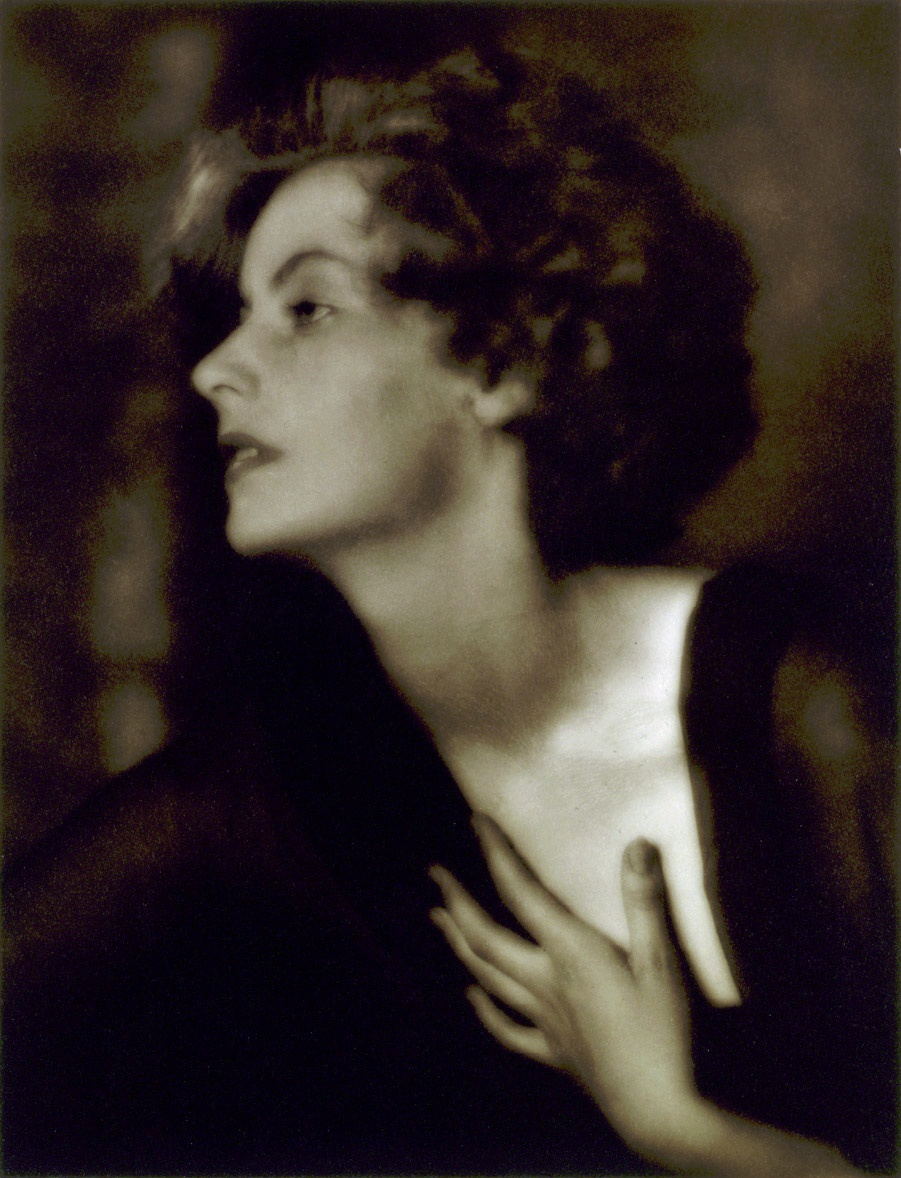
Greta Garbo (1925)

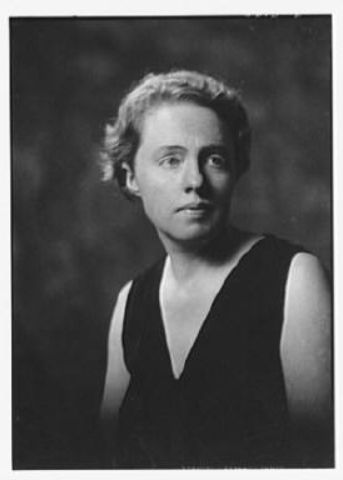
Miss I. A. R. Wylie (1928)

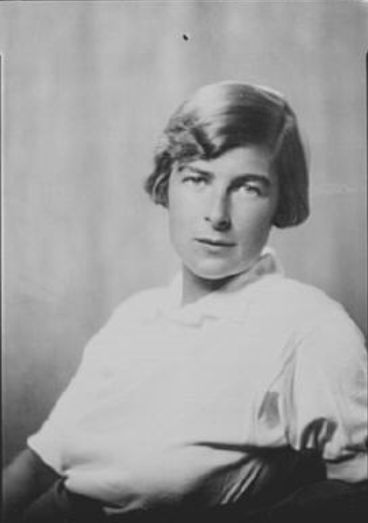
Miss Isabel Pell (1930)

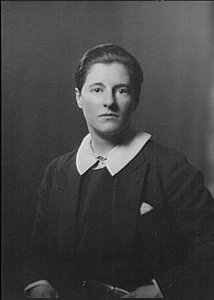
Miss Marion Barbara 'Joe' Carstairs (1928 or 1929)

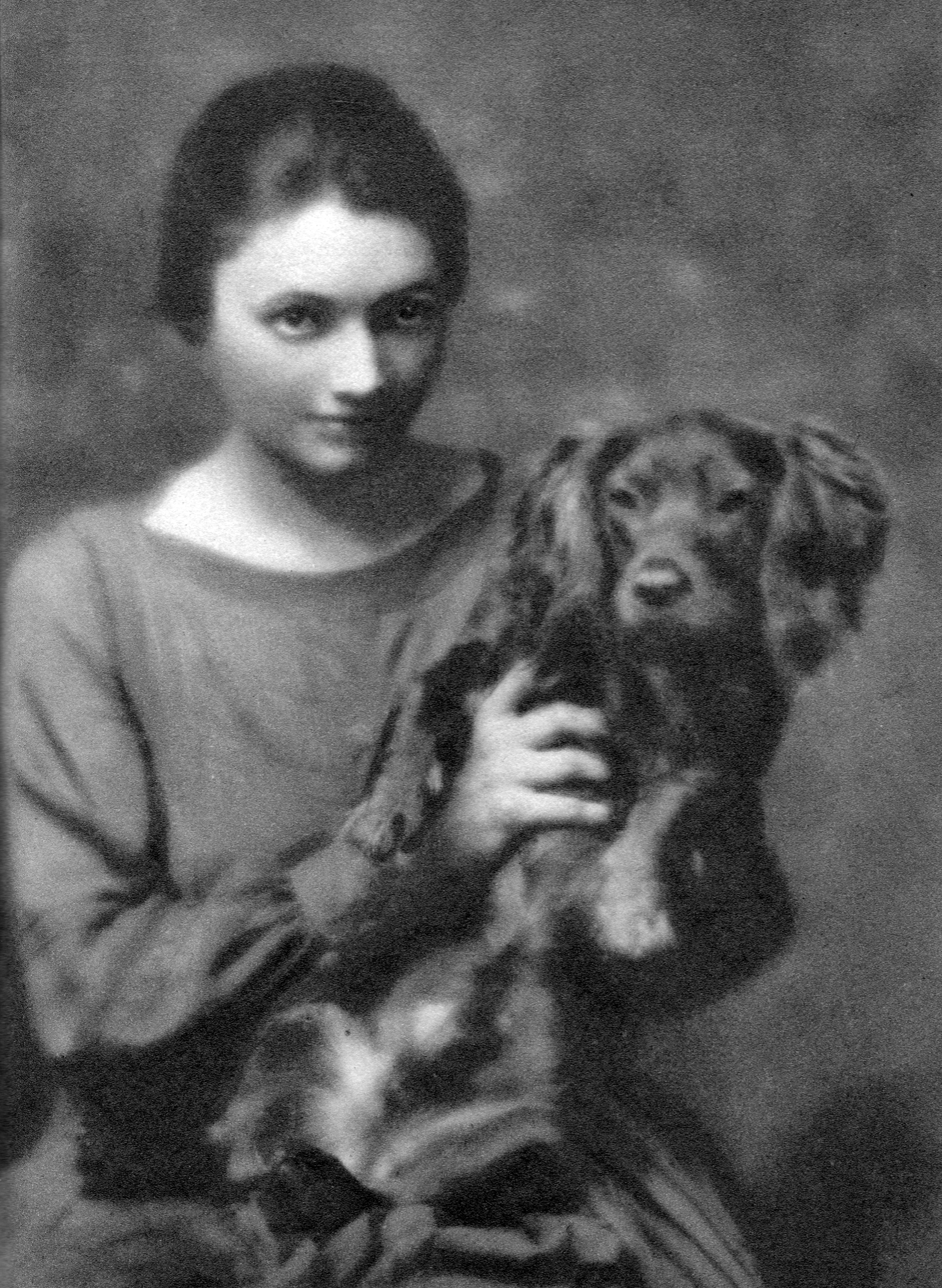
Miss Katharine Cornell with dog (1917)

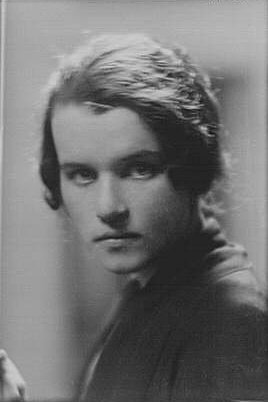
Margarett Sargent (1915)

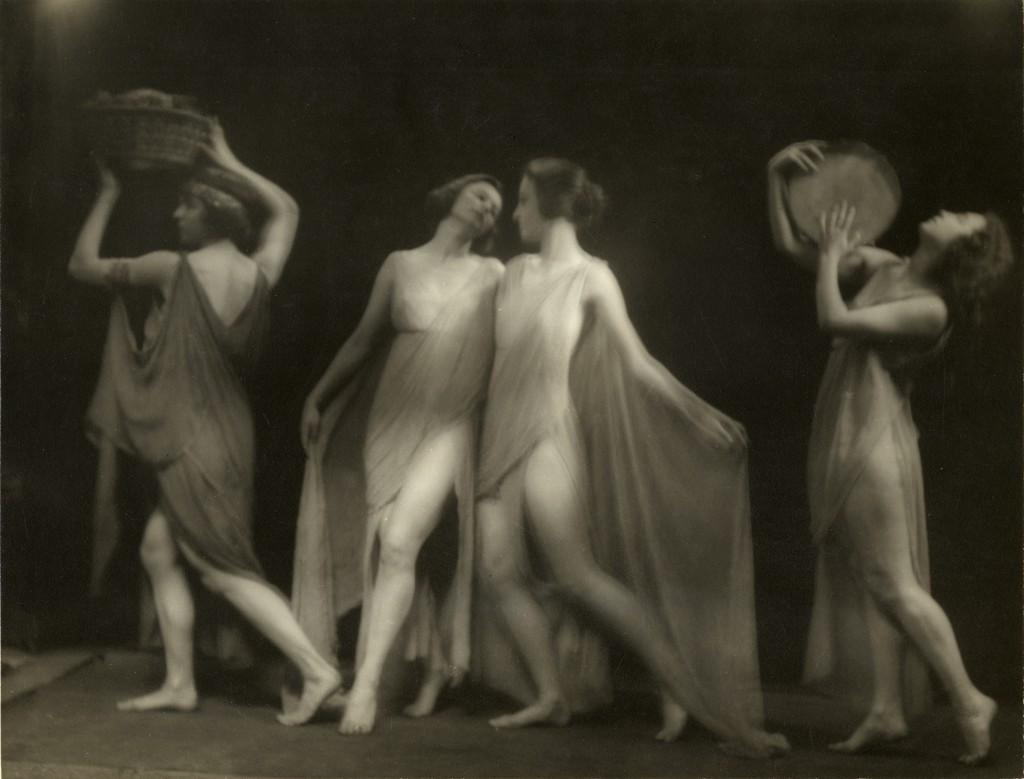
Marion Morgan dancers (between 1914 and 1927) (Marion Morgan, Josephine H. McLean, Dulce Bramley Moore, Taisy Darling)

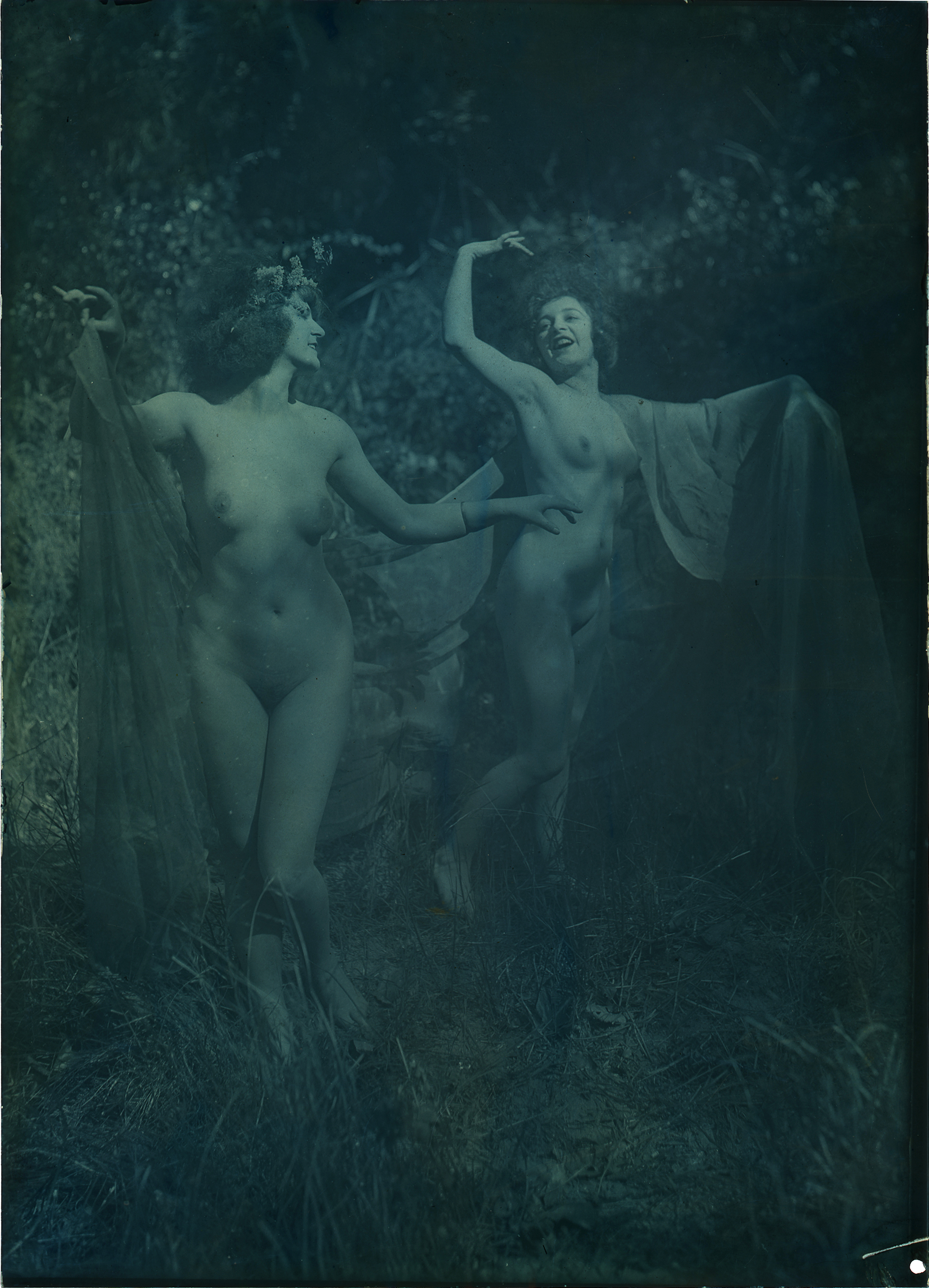
Helen Moller nude dancers (circa 1918)

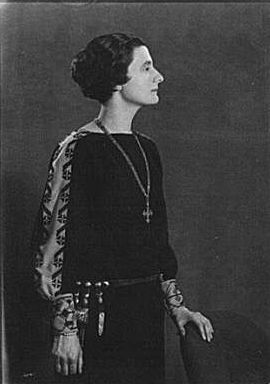
Mercedes de Acosta (after 1919)

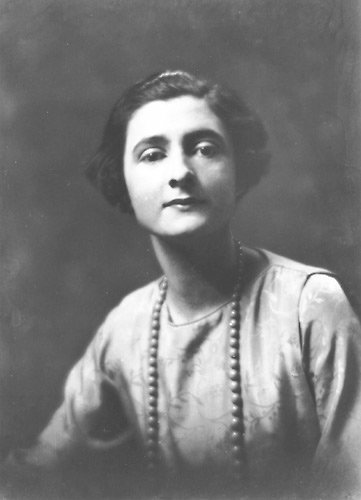
Mercedes de Acosta (1919 or 1920)

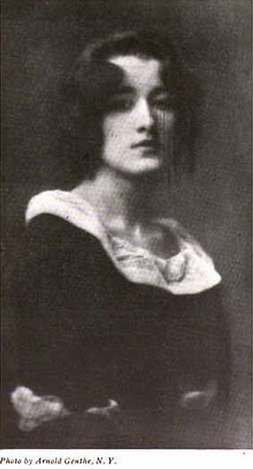
Thelma Given (1919)

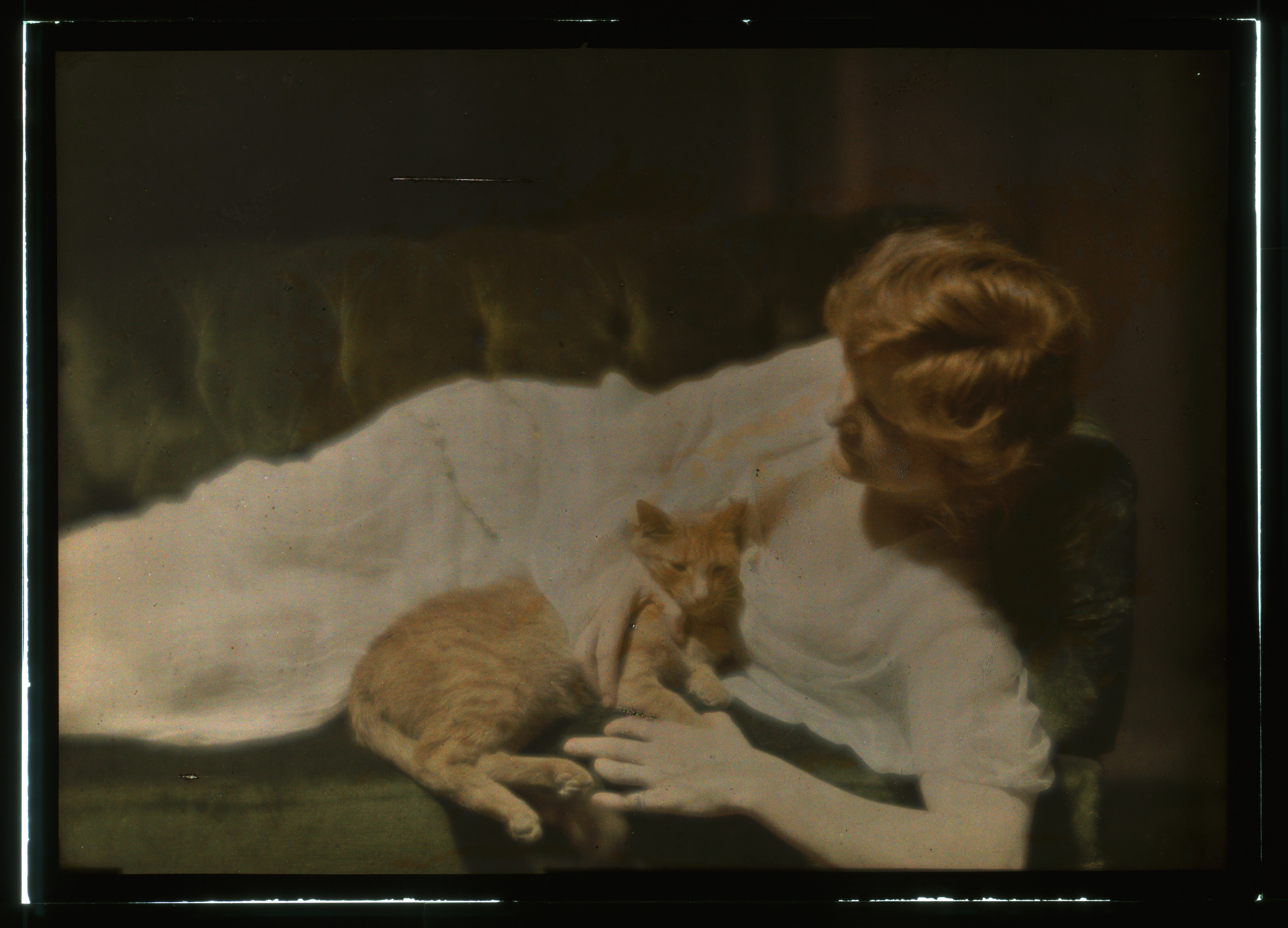
Ann Murdock with Buzzer the cat, autochrome

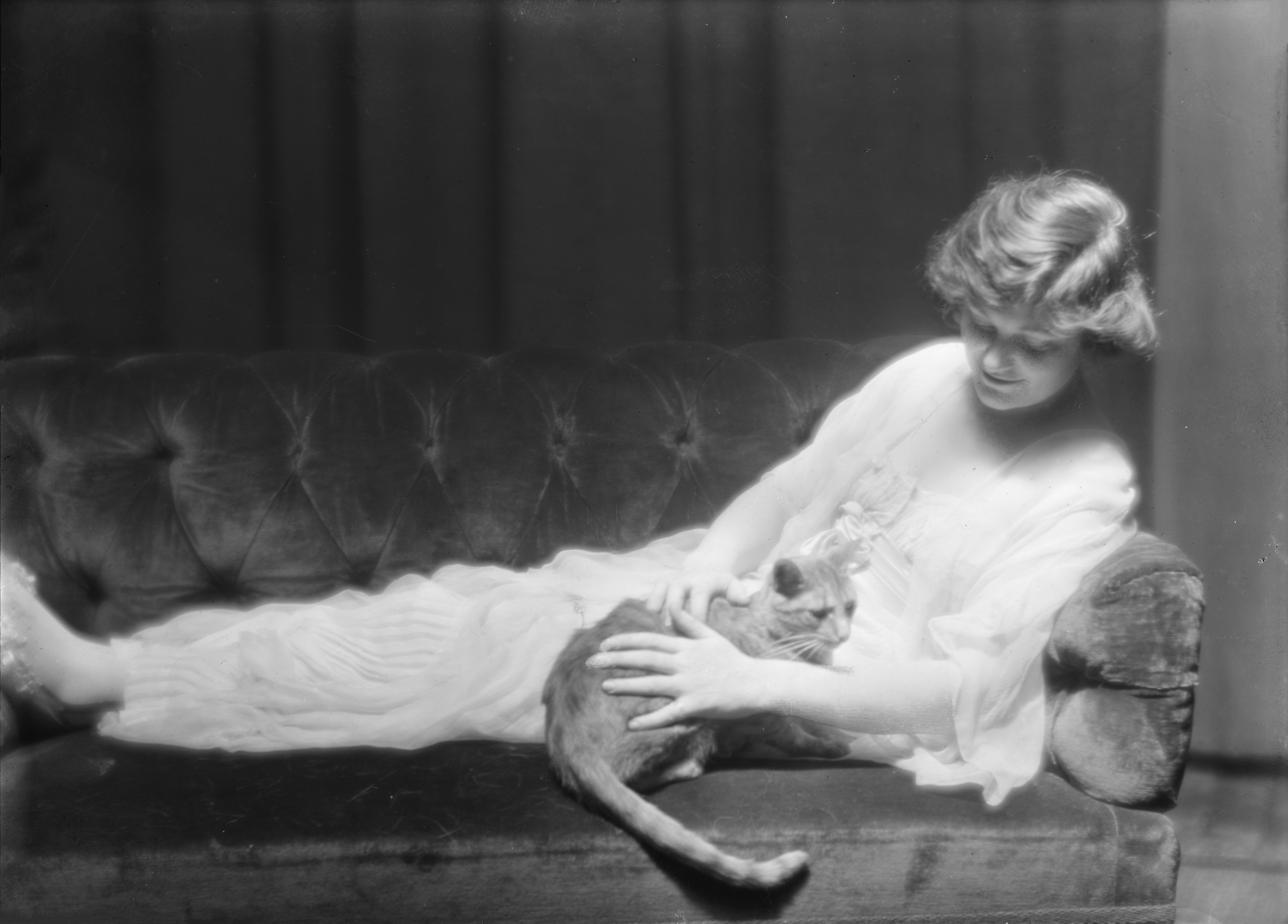
Ann Murdock with Buzzer the cat, monochrome

== Publications ==
- Text by Will Irwin, images by Arnold Genthe, Pictures of Old Chinatown. New York: Moffat, Yard and Co., 1908 (free download)
  - Arnold Genthe, selection and text by John Tchen, Genthe's Photographs of San Francisco's Old Chinatown, New York: Dover Publications. 1984 ISBN 0-486-24592-6
- Arnold Genthe, The Book of the Dance, Boston, Mass.: International Publishers, 1920, c. 1916
- Arnold Genthe, foreword by Grace King, Impressions of Old New Orleans, New York: George H. Doran Co., c. 1926
- Arnold Genthe, Isadora Duncan: Twenty Four Studies, New York: M. Kennerley 1929; reprinted by Books for Libraries, 1980 ISBN 0-8369-9306-3
- Arnold Genthe, As I remember, New York: Reynal & Hitchcock, c. 1936
- Arnold Genthe, Highlights and Shadows, New York: Greenberg, c. 1937
- William Bronson, "The Earth Shook, The Sky Burned", Garden City, NY: Doubleday & Co., 1959; many images of the San Francisco earthquake and fire of 1906 taken by Arnold Genthe

== Notes ==
- Mel Byars, N. Elizabeth Schlatter, "Genthe, Arnold". American National Biography Online. Feb. 2000. Accessed September 2006 (subscription required).
