= Looking Down Sacramento Street, San Francisco, April 18, 1906 =

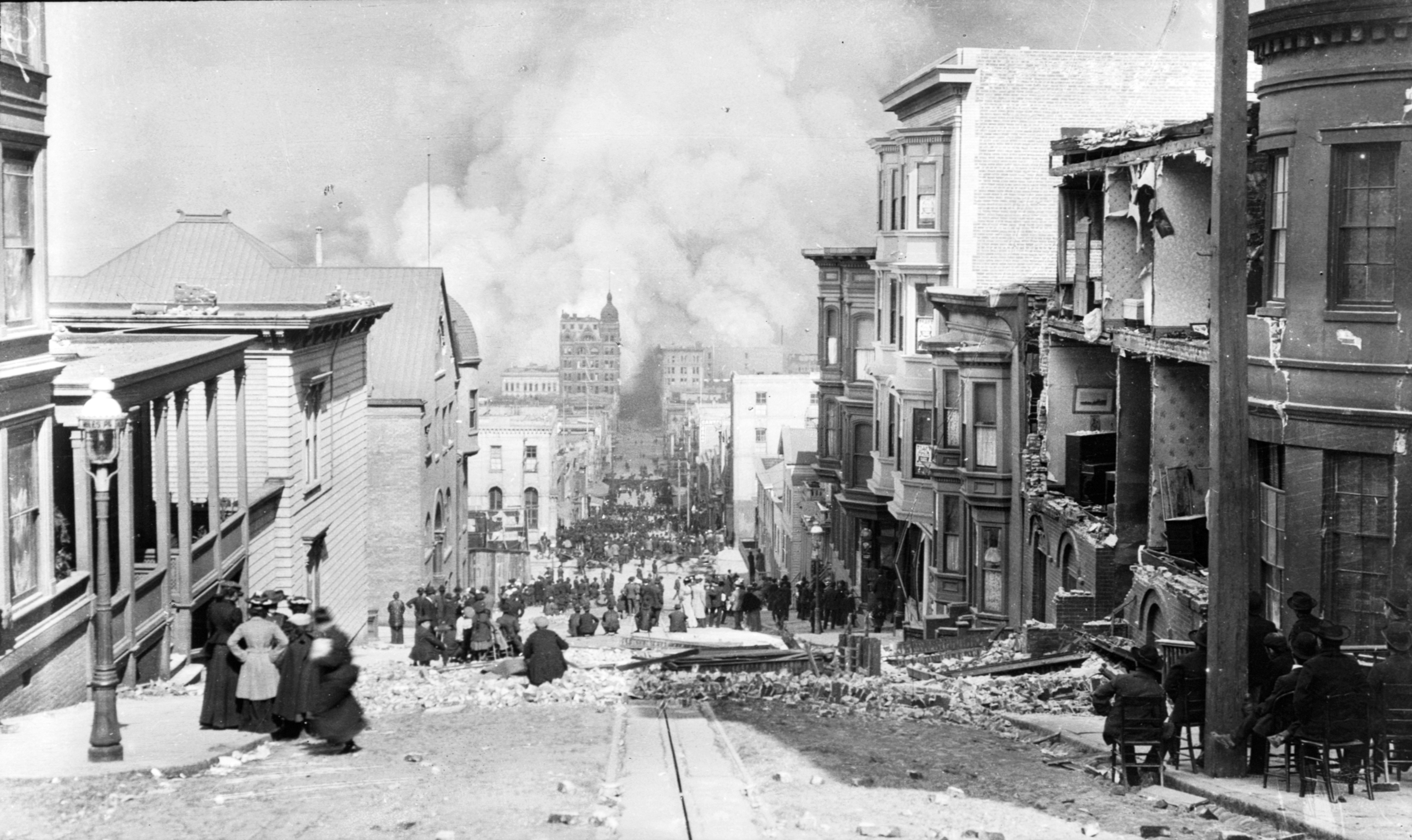
Photographer Arnold Genthe took the most famous photo of the destruction of San Francisco by earthquake and fire on April 18, 1906

Looking Down Sacramento Street, San Francisco, April 18, 1906 is a black and white photograph taken by Arnold Genthe in San Francisco, California on the morning of April 18, 1906 in the wake of the 1906 San Francisco earthquake.

== Caption ==
Looking Down Sacramento St., 1906. [verso:] "San Francisco: April 18, 1906." From As I Remember by Arnold Genthe: This photograph shows "the results of the earth quake, the beginning of the fire and the attitude of the people." It was taken the morning of the first day of the fire. Shows Sacramento St. at Miles Place (now Miller Place) near Powell St.

== Creation of the photograph ==
Similar contemporary views, looking east along Sacramento

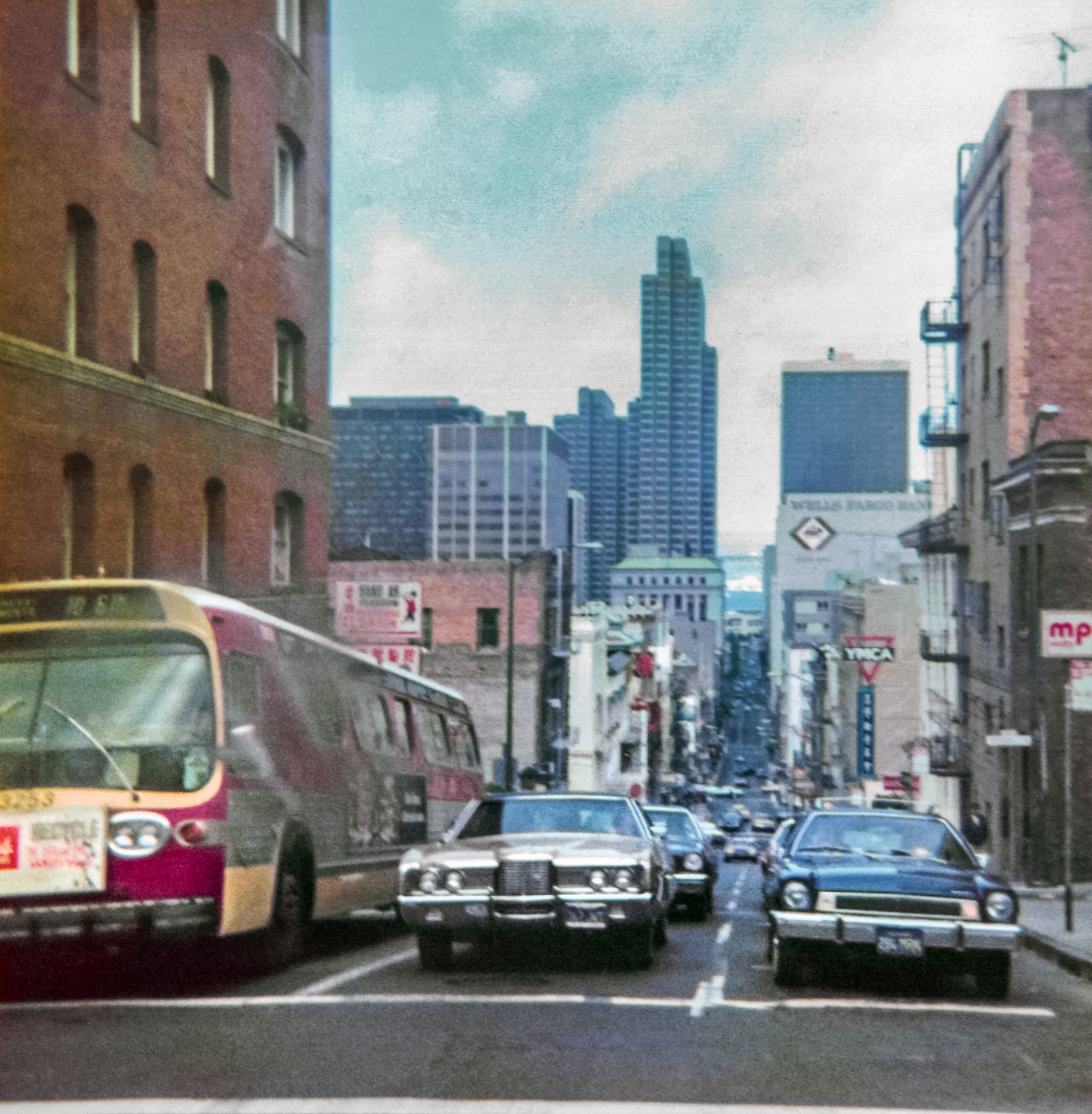
At the intersection with Stockton on July 18, 1975

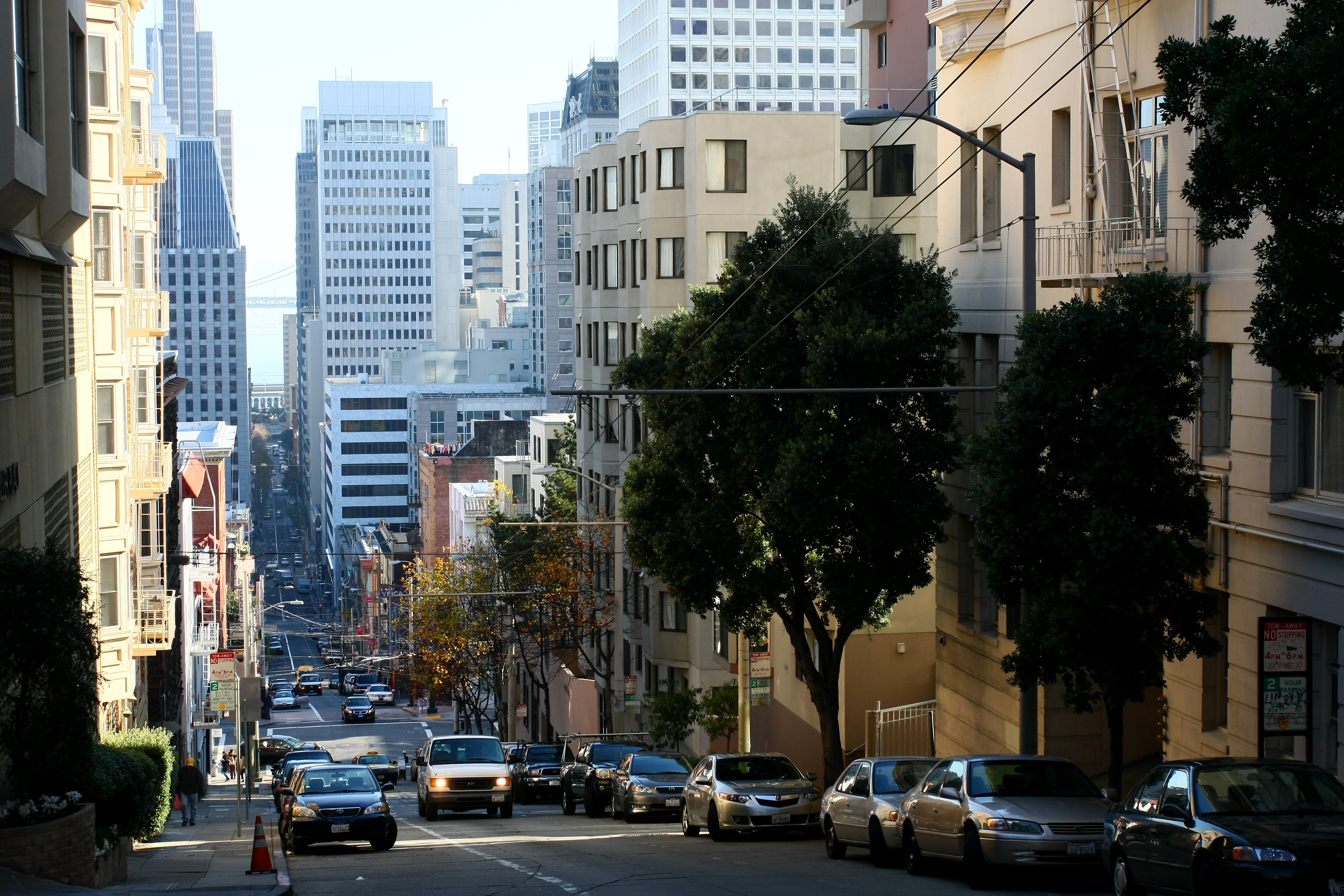
Near the intersection with Miller in 2009

I found that my hand cameras had been so damaged by the falling plaster as to be rendered useless. I went to Montgomery Street to the shop of George Kahn, my dealer, and asked him to lend me a camera. 'Take anything you want. This place is going to burn up anyway.' I selected the best small camera, a 3A Kodak Special. I stuffed my pockets with films and started out. [...] Of the pictures I had made during the fire, there are several, I believe, that will be of lasting interest. There is particularly the one scene that I recorded the morning of the first day of the fire (on Sacramento Street, looking toward the Bay) which shows, in a pictorially effective composition, the results of the earthquake, the beginning of the fire and the attitude of the people. On the right is a house, the front of which had collapsed into the street. The occupants are sitting on chairs calmly watching the approach of the fire. Groups of people are standing in the street, motionless, gazing at the clouds of smoke. When the fire crept up close, they would just move up a block. It is hard to believe that such a scene actually occurred in the way the photograph represents it. Several people upon seeing it have exclaimed, "Oh, is that a still from a Cecil De Mille picture?" To which the answer has been, "No. the director of this scene was the Lord himself." A few months ago an interview about my work--I had told the story of that fire picture--appeared in a New York paper with the headline, "His pictures posed by the Lord, says photographer."

-Arnold Genthe, As I Remember

On 18 April 1906, the morning of the great San Francisco earthquake, Genthe, with his cameras and studio destroyed, borrowed a hand-held camera and photographed the destruction across the city. Of his over 180 surviving, sharp-focus photographs of San Francisco, probably his most famous image is "San Francisco, April 18th, 1906," which shows a view from Nob Hill, down Sacramento Street. Enormous clouds of smoke ominously approach, buildings' facades have collapse from the quake, and residents stand and sit in the street, in a stupor, calmly watching the approaching fire.

- Mel Byars, N. Elizabeth Schlatter. "Genthe, Arnold"

== In popular culture ==
The photograph is one of the "famous disasters" that hang on the wall of the night club "The Blue Note" in the David Zucker film The Naked Gun 2½: The Smell of Fear.
