= Thelma Given =

American violinist (1896–1977)

Thelma Given Verdi
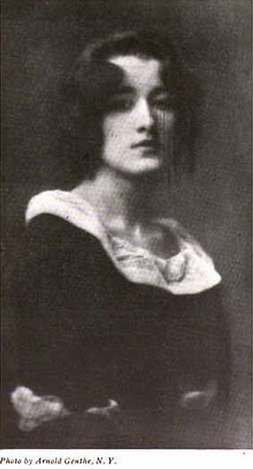
- Thelma Given, photographed by Arnold Genthe, from a 1919 advertisement.
- Born: March 9, 1896; Columbus, Ohio, U.S.
- Died: December 25, 1977 (aged 81); Boston, Massachusetts, U.S.
- Spouse: Minturn de Suzzara Verdi (m. 1943; died 1970)

Thelma Mary Given Verdi (March 9, 1896 — December 25, 1977) was an American violinist and child musical prodigy.

== Early life ==
Thelma Mary Given was born in Columbus, Ohio, and raised in Decatur, Illinois, the daughter of James Frederick Given and Emma Jones Given. Her musical abilities were recognized by age 5. She studied with Leopold Auer in Russia. She toured Europe with Auer as a teenager, and was caught in the tumult of war and the Russian Revolution for almost a year before she and her mother were able to return to the United States.

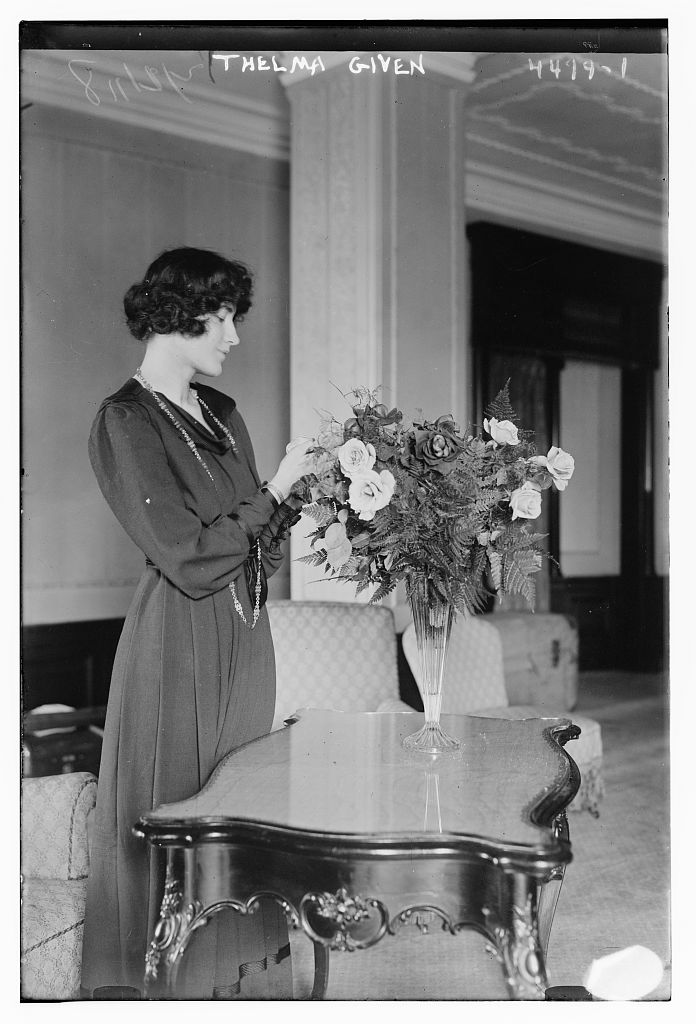
Given in 1918.

== Career ==
Given made her American debut at Carnegie Hall in 1918. She returned to the Carnegie Hall stage several times. She toured in the United States and Europe in the 1920s and 1930s, given recitals and as guest soloist with orchestras. She played a Guarneri violin made in 1738.

== Personal life ==
Given lived much of her adult life living with her mother and brother Eben Given (a painter), at Saranac Lake, and in the arts colony at Provincetown, Massachusetts, in social circles that included playwright Eugene O'Neill. She married in 1943, as the third wife of Minturn de Suzzara Verdi, a New York lawyer.

Thelma Given Verdi was widowed in 1970, and she died on Christmas Day, 1977, aged 81 years, in Boston, Massachusetts, after a stroke. Papers associated with Thelma Given, including concert programs, letters, and a clippings album of reviews, are archived by the Provincetown History Preservation Project.
