= Thérèse Bonney =

American photographer and publicist

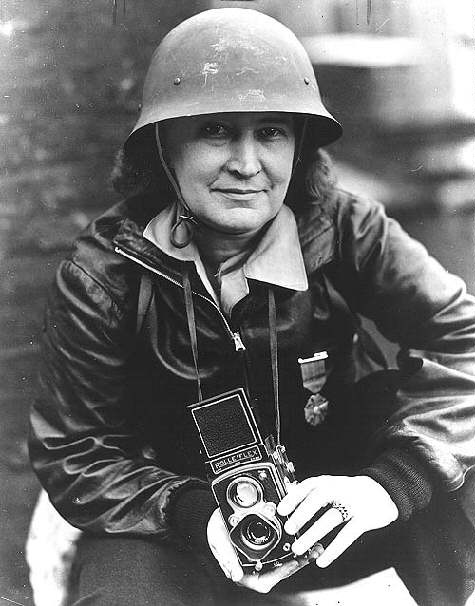
- Bonney in 1940
- Born: Mabel Bonney; July 15, 1894; Syracuse, New York
- Died: January 15, 1978 (aged 83); Paris, France
- Occupations: Photographer; Publicist

Thérèse Bonney (born Mabel Bonney; July 15, 1894 – January 15, 1978) was an American photographer and publicist. She was best known for her images taken during World War II on the Russian-Finnish front. Her war effort earned her the Croix de Guerre in May 1941 and was made Officer of the Légion d'Honneur in February 1947. She published several photo-essays, and was the subject of the 1944 True Comics issue "Photo-fighter."

== Early life and education ==
Mabel Thérèse Bonney was born in July 15, 1894, in Syracuse, New York. She earned a Bachelor of Arts degree at the University of California, Berkeley in 1916 and a master's degree the following year from Radcliffe College in Cambridge, Massachusetts. She settled in Paris and studied at the Sorbonne from 1918–1919, publishing a thesis on the moral ideas in the theater of Alexandre Dumas, père. She earned a docteur-des-lettres degree in 1921. She thus became the youngest person, the fourth woman, and the tenth American of either sex to earn the degree from the institution. She was also the first American to receive a scholarship from the Sorbonne. After graduation she received multiple sources of financial aid, including the Horatio Stebbins Scholarship; the Belknap, Baudrillart, and Billy Fellowships; and the Carl Schurz Memorial Foundation Oberländer grant in 1936, which allowed her to study German contributions to the history of photography.

== Career ==
Beginning in 1925, she thoroughly documented the French decorative arts through photography. At this time, most of the photographs were not taken by Bonney herself, but rather gathered from sources such as the collections of fellow photographers, photo agencies, architects, designers, stores, and various establishments. An ardent self-publicist, Bonney acquired the images directly from the Salon exhibitions, stores, manufacturers, architects, and designers of furniture, ceramics, jewelry, and other applied arts as well as architecture. She sold the photographic prints to various client-subscribers primarily in the U.S. (a small-effort precursor to today's illustrated news agency) and charged fees for reproduction rights in a more traditional manner. She typed captions and glued them to the backs of the photographic prints. These photographs, sometimes garnered without permissions, were widely published — both with and without published credits.

She attended the 1930 "Stockholmsutstäliningen" (Stockholm Exhibition) and gathered photographs there. While in the Netherlands, she collected images of contemporary Dutch architecture.

After her decade-and-a-half activities in publicity and the photography of the decorative arts and architecture by others, Bonney took up photography herself and became a photojournalist. Her concerns with the ravages caused by World War II informed her images, which focused on civilians. Her early photographs focused at first on the individuals at the Russian-Finnish front. For her documentation of this demographic, she was granted the Order of the White Rose of Finland medal for bravery.

She also traveled through western Europe during the World War II, taking photographs of children in dire conditions. A collection of the images were shown at The Museum of Modern Art in New York City in 1940 and later published in her 1943 book Europe's Children. Other activities included serving with the Croix-rouge (French International Red Cross). During the war, she also performed missions for the Office of Strategic Services (OSS).

Toward the end of her life, Bonney donated her estate of furniture to her Alma mater in Berkeley, California, and photographs and negatives — many duplicates of one another — to a number of other institutions in the U.S. and France. Other documents and books were donated to St. Bonaventure University by Ralph King.

In France, approximately 3,000 of her existing negatives are part of the collection of the Caisse Nationale des Monuments Historique et des Sites (CHMHS), formerly stored in Paris and today in St. Cloud. (In 2000, the CHMHS became the Centre des monuments nationaux [CMN].) The CHMHS archive has been digitally copied to save the images, due to the deteriorating negatives. Approximately 2,000 negatives and 1,500 prints are a part of the collection of the Bibliothèque historique de la ville de Paris. And 3,000 negatives exist in the Fort de Saint-Cyr, Montigny-le-Bretonneux (Yvelines).

In the U.S., approximately 4,000 vintage photographic prints were donated to the Cooper-Hewitt, National Design Museum in New York City, initially organized in the 1990s with funds from the Smithsonian Institution Women's Council (SIWC) by archivist Mel Byars. But not all exist today. Her extensive collection of World War II photographs, photographic portraits of designers and architects, paintings by 20th-century artists, and her furniture (including examples by Pierre Chareau) was donated to the University of California, Berkeley. Her personal papers and photographic archives are available at the university's Bancroft Library, and other objects are at the Berkeley Art Museum. Some 6,200 photographs are held by the Photography Collection of the New York Public Library, including large numbers of images from Finland.

== Personal life ==
Bonney never married. She claimed to have adopted a child, but legally did not. She provided a false date of her birth, which has since been corrected by an extant birth certificate, a copy held by a biographer, Claire Bonney. She died in Paris on January 15, 1978.

== Exhibitions ==
- "War Comes to People: History Written with a Lens by Therese Bonney," The Museum of Modern Art, New York, 1940.
- "Selections from the Thérèse Bonney Collection of the Cooper-Hewitt, National Design Museum," International Center for Photography, New York, 1976.
- "Paris Recorded: Thérèse Bonney Collection," Cooper-Hewitt National Design Museum, New York, 1985.
- "Aren't They Lively?: An Exhibition of the Bequest of Thérèse Bonney, Class of 1916, University of California," Berkeley Art Museum, June–September 1992.

== Works ==
- With sister Louise Bonney. Buying Antique and Modern Furniture in Paris. New York: Robert M. McBride and Company, 1929 | Library of Congress NK949.P27.B6
- With sister Louise Bonney. French Cooking for American Kitchens. New York: Robert M. McBride and Company, 1929 | Library of Congress TX719.B673
- With sister Louise Bonney. Guide to The Restaurants of Paris. New York: Robert M. McBride and Company, 1929 | Library of Congress TX637.B6
- With sister Louise Bonney. A Shopping Guide to Paris. New York: Robert M. McBride and Company, 1929 | Library of Congress DC708.B55
- Remember When: A Pictorial Chronicle of the Turn of The Century and of The Days Known as Edwardian....From The Collection of M. Therese Bonney. New York: Coward McCann, 1933 | Library of Congress N7592.B6
- Europe's Children, 1939 - 1943, New York: Rhode Publishing, 1943 | Library of Congress D810.C4 B68 1944
- Rattray, R. F. with photographs by Bonney. Bernard Shaw: A Chronicle. New York: Roy Publishers, 1951 | Library of Congress PR5366.R3
