= Mel Byars =

American design historian

Mel Byars (born in Columbia, South Carolina) is an American design historian.

== Biography ==
The earliest award he received a small trophy at age thirteen for a school-newspaper piece. Two years later he was granted further recognition in a poetry contest.

Previously to The New School’s graduate curriculum of School of Media Studies, he studied journalism in the late 1950s at the University of South Carolina. and subsequently settled in New York City.

His first professional employment was as a book designer of a large number of titles for McGraw-Hill in New York City, including the format General McArthur’s autobiography and 888-page Warren Commission report of the John F. Kennedy’s assassination.

Byars eventually became active as an art director or creative director for a number of publishers, including a group of professional magazines at Bill Publications in the late 1960s, after Prentice-Hall and for advertising agencies such as Leber Katz Partners (subsumed into Foote, Cone & Belding, the world's second oldest advertising agency, founded 1873). In the early 1980s, he studied anthropology under Stanley Diamond (1921–1991) in the master's-degree program of The New School for Social Research. And, previously there, he was enrolled in the School of Media Studies.

A decade later, Byars turned to the history of applied art/industrial design and served as the archivist and organizer of the Thérèse Bonney Photography Collection (images of 1925-35 French decorative arts and other subjects) in New York's Cooper-Hewitt National Design Museum and has been a major donor of 20th-century objects to the museum's permanent collection. He has made other donations to the Museum of Decorative Arts in Prague (Uměleckoprůmyslová museum v Praze), Israel Museum, Musée des Arts Décoratifs, Paris, and Columbia Museum of Art.

Byars has taught at Pratt Institute and Fashion Institute of Technology (FIT) in New York City and Bezalel Academy of Arts and Design and Holon Institute of Technology in Israel and at others as well as lectured widely while remaining active in the advertising sector. From 2017 to 2019, he wrote essays on a wide range of subjects for Elephant art and culture magazine.

He retired in 2015 when in his 80s.

== Awards/works ==
Byars's most significant work is the second edition (2004) of The Design Encyclopedia, which won the Besterman/McColvin Gold Medal for the best reference book of 2004 from the British Chartered Institute of Library and Information Professionals. When active in graphic design earlier in his career, he won a number of awards, including from the Art Directors Club of New York and had works published in various books such as 100 Years of Dance Posters and Dance Posters.

In addition to The Design Encyclopedia, other literary works include more than a dozen books, essays for various design-exhibition catalogs, book introductions and articles for I.D., Beaux Arts, Clear, Echoes, Graphis, form, and other periodicals. A number of the books have been translated into Japanese, Chinese, Spanish, Italian, French, Portuguese, and Hebrew.

== Bibliography ==
- "What Makes American Design American?", introduction in reprint, R.L. Leonard and C.A. Glassgold, eds., Mocern American Design by the American Union of Decorative Artists & Craftsmen, New York: Ives Washburn, 1930 (reprint New York: Acanthus, 1992) | ISBN 0-926494-01-5
- Introduction in Bořek Šípek: blízkost dálky, architektura a design = the nearness of far, architecture and design, exhibition cat., Amsterdam: Steltman, 1993, in English, Czech, and Japanese | ASIN B000J3L54S
- The Design Encyclopedia, New York: John Wiley, 1994 | ISBN 0-471-02455-4
- 50 Chairs: Innovations in Design Materials (Introduction by Alexander von Vegesack), Hove, UK: RotoVision, 1996 | ISBN 0-8230-6505-7
- 50 Lights: Innovations in Design and Materials (Introduction by Paola Antonelli), Hove, UK: RotoVision, 1997 | ISBN 2-88046-265-7
- Tropical Modern: The Designs of Fernando and Humberto Campana, Mel Byars, ed., et al., New York: Acanthus Press, 1998 | ISBN 9780926494183
- 50 Tables: Innovations in Design and Materials (Introduction by Sylvain Dubuisson), Hove, UK: RotoVision, 1998 | ISBN 2-88046-311-4
- 50 Products: Innovation in Design and Materials (Introduction by David Revere McFadden), New York: Watson-Guptill, 1998 | ISBN 0-8230-6794-7
- 100 Designs/100 Years: A Celebration of the 20th Century (with Arlette Barré-Despond), Hove, UK: RotoVision, 1999 | ISBN 2-88046-442-0
- 50 Sport Wares. Innovations in Design and Materials (Introduction by Aaron Betsky), Hove, UK: RotoVision, 1999 | ISBN 2-88046-418-8
- On/Off: New Electronic Products, New York: Universe Books, and Kempen: teNeues, 2001 | ISBN 0-7893-0648-4
- 50 Beds: Innovations in Design and Materials (Introduction by Brice d'Antras), Hove, UK: RotoVision, 2001 | ISBN 2-88046-449-8
- Design in Steel, London: Laurence King, 2003 | ISBN 1-85669-313-9
- The Design Encyclopedia (Foreword by Terence Riley), New York: The Museum of Modern Art, 2004 | ISBN 0-87070-012-X
- New Chairs: Innovations in Design, Technology, and Materials, San Francisco: Chronicle Books, and London: Laurence King, 2006 | ISBN 0-8118-5364-0
- Improvisation: New Israeli Design (אימפרוביזציה - עיצוב חדש בישראל), Tel Aviv: The Haim Rubin Tel Aviv University Press, 2007 (in Hebrew) | ISBN 978-965-7241-28-8
