= Communications Workers of America v. Beck =

- Supreme Court of the United States

Argued January 11, 1988 Decided June 29, 1988
- Full case name: Communications Workers of America, et al. v. Beck, et al.
- Citations: 487 U.S. 735 (more) 108 S. Ct. 2641; 101 L. Ed. 2d 634; 1988 U.S. LEXIS 3030; 56 U.S.L.W. 4857; 128 L.R.R.M. 2729

Case history
- Prior: 468 F. Supp. 93 (D. Md. 1979); 776 F.2d 1187 (4th Circ. 1985), on rehearing en banc, 800 F.2d 1280 (4th Cir. 1986); cert. granted, 482 U.S. 904 (1987).

Holding
- Under a union security agreement, unions are authorized by statute to collect from non-members only those fees and dues necessary to perform its duties as a collective bargaining representative.

Court membership
- Chief Justice William Rehnquist Associate Justices William J. Brennan Jr. · Byron White; Thurgood Marshall · Harry Blackmun; John P. Stevens · Sandra Day O'Connor; Antonin Scalia · Anthony Kennedy

Case opinions
- Majority: Brennan, joined by Rehnquist, White, Marshall, Stevens; Blackmun, O'Connor, Scalia (Parts I and II)
- Concur/dissent: Blackmun, joined by O'Connor, Scalia
- Kennedy took no part in the consideration or decision of the case.

Laws applied
- National Labor Relations Act §8(a)(3)

Communications Workers of America v. Beck, 487 U.S. 735 (1988), is a decision by the United States Supreme Court which held that, in a union security agreement, unions are authorized by statute to collect from non-members only those fees and dues necessary to perform its duties as a collective bargaining representative. The rights identified by the Court in Communications Workers of America v. Beck have since come to be known as "Beck rights", and defining what Beck rights are and how a union must fulfill its duties regarding them is an active area of modern United States labor law.

== Background ==
The union security agreement is a contractual agreement, usually part of a union collective bargaining agreement, in which an employer and a trade or labor union agree on the extent to which the union may compel employees to join the union, and/or whether the employer will collect dues, fees, and assessments on behalf of the union. Broadly speaking, there are three types of union security agreements:

1. The closed shop, where only union members may be hired, and an employee must remain a union member in order to remain employed;
2. The union shop, where the employer may hire union or non-union workers, but employees must join the union in order to remain employed; and
3. The agency shop, where the employer may hire union or non-union workers, and employees need not join the union in order to remain employed. However, the non-union worker must pay a fee to cover collective bargaining costs.

In the United States, the fee paid by non-union members under the agency shop is known as the "agency fee". Where the agency shop is illegal, as is common in labor law governing American public sector unions, a "fair share provision" may be agreed to by the union and the employer. The provision requires non-union employees a pay "fair share fee" to cover the costs of the union's collective bargaining activities. The "fair share" is similar to the agency shop, but usually more restrictive as to what may be charged to the non-member.

In the United States, the concepts of closed shop, union shop, and agency shop have been established since at least the 1880s. The National Labor Relations Act (NLRA), the primary federal law governing labor relations in the United States, was enacted in 1935 and formally legalized the closed shop, union shop, or agency shop. In 1947, however, Congress enacted the Taft-Hartley Act, which amended the NLRA. Title I, Section 101 of the Taft-Hartley Act added a new Section 14 to the NLRA, part (b) of which banned the closed shop:

Nothing in this Act shall be construed as authorizing the execution or application of agreements requiring membership in a labor organization as a condition of employment in any State or Territory in which such execution or application is prohibited by State or Territorial law.

The Taft-Haftley Act did not, however, outlaw the union shop or agency shop (although it did place some procedural restrictions on their establishment and use).

During World War II, Congress also banned union political contributions to federal campaigns. The Smith-Connally Act, enacted in 1943, banned the use of union members' dues to make direct contributions to candidates for federal office but did not ban indirect expenditures which educated union members or the public about a candidate's voting record. The Taft-Hartley Act made that ban permanent. In 1948, the U.S. Supreme Court held that the Taft-Hartley Act's ban on use of union dues for political purposes did not extend to internal communications directed at a union's own members. Eleven years later, the Court refused to consider a federal district court's ruling that Taft-Hartley Act did not ban expenditure of union dues on communications with the public.

Disputes over the constitutional and statutory status of union shop and agency shop agreements began almost immediately after the passage of the Taft-Hartley Act. In the Supreme Court's first major ruling on the issue in Railway Employees' Dept. v. Hanson, 351 U.S. 225 (1956), the Court held that the union security provisions of the Railway Labor Act were constitutional, but withheld judgment as to "the validity or enforceability of a union or closed shop agreement if other conditions of union membership are imposed or if the exaction of dues, initiation fees or assessments is used as a cover for forcing ideological conformity or other action in contravention of the First or the Fifth Amendment". The ruling in Hanson appeared to call into serious question the viability of union shop agreements. Five years later, in Machinists v. Street, 367 U.S. 740 (1961), the Court held that the Railway Labor Act "denies the authority to a union, over the employee's objection, to spend his money for political causes which he opposes". The high court also confronted the issue of remedy in Machinists v. Street, and outlined several options which unions and employers might adopt as well as rejecting remedies which the district court in the case had chosen. The Supreme Court returned to the union security issue three more times in 1963. In NLRB v. General Motors Corp., 373 U.S. 734 (1963), the Court held that agency fees equal to dues are not prohibited by the National Labor Relations Act. Nonetheless, in Retail Clerks v. Schermerhorn, 373 U.S. 746 (1963), the Court questioned whether an agency fee set at a level equal to member dues was unfair because it set collective bargaining fees higher for non-members than for members. After reargument, however, the Court in Retail Clerks v. Schermerhorn, 375 U.S. 96 (1963), did not reach the issue again and instead decided the case on narrow procedural grounds (concluding that Florida's right-to-work law outlawed the union shop provision at issue). The Court further elaborated on the issue of remedies in Railway Clerks v. Allen, 373 U.S. 113 (1963), allowing agency fee payers to opt out of all political expenditures rather than enunciate specific examples but refusing to allow them to act as a class. The Supreme Court extended its constitutional and equity analysis to public employees in Abood v. Detroit Board of Education, 431 U.S. 209 (1977), holding that, where public employee collective bargaining exists and agency fee clauses are clearly authorized by law, public employee agency fee mechanisms are also constitutional.

Similarly, the National Labor Relations Board (NLRB) had had occasion since 1945 to address the union shop and agency fee issues. Among its key cases was In re Union Starch & Refining Co., 87 NLRB 779, (1949). The Board held in Union Starch that unions were permitted to charge nonmembers agency fees that were nearly equal to full union dues so long as these agency fees were uniform in nature and no additional requirements were made in violation of NLRA Section 8(a)(3)(B) or §8(b)(2). A second important case, Teamsters Local No. 959, 167 NLRB 1042 (1967), the Board concluded that special assessments or fees could not be part of the agency fee. Reacting to the Supreme Court's ruling in Retail Clerks v. Schermerhorn, the Board held in Detroit Mailers Union No. 40, 192 NLRB 951 (1971) that certain fraternal activities may be included in the agency fee so long as they are not special assessments. The Board also ruled repeatedly on a number of issues associated with agency fees. It held in several cases that the NLRA does not permit the collection of assessments through the agency fee. The RLA, in contrast, does. The Board also held that when determining what an assessment is, facts (not labels) matter most.

In the years just before the Supreme Court took up the Beck case, however, it elaborated on its previous agency fee rulings. In Ellis v. Railway Clerks, 466 U.S. 435 (1984), the Supreme Court concluded that the agency fee may only cover those activities directly related to the union's role as a collective bargaining representative. These included national conventions (where dues levels were set and union programs debated and established), social activities (which enhanced union solidarity, especially during negotiations), grievance handling, contract negotiation costs, and union communications, but excluded union organizing activities. The Court in Ellis also wrestled with the issue of rebates, and concluded that a union could not simply rebate agency fees to workers for that would essentially constitute a forced, interest-free loan from the worker to the union. In 1985, the Court held in Pattern Makers v. NLRB, 473 U.S. 95 (1985), that a union member may resign at any time without notice. Thus, Pattern Makers further undermined the union shop by giving workers the right to resign from the union at any time and incur no penalty (such as termination of employment). The Court also crafted additional rules regarding agency fees in Teachers v. Hudson, 475 U.S. 292 (1986). In Teachers, the union had failed to minimize the risk that agency fees might be used for impermissible purposes and had failed to provide agency fee payers with adequate information about how the agency fee was calculated. Now the Supreme Court imposed a third requirement, that agency fee payers must be offered a timely, fair, and objective mechanism for challenging the computation of agency fees. The Court did uphold, however, the use of interest-bearing escrow accounts for holding disputed dues.

Despite these many rulings, the Supreme Court had never extended its agency fee rulings to unions covered by the National Labor Relations Act and many lower courts were confused as to the state of the law. In 1986, the 2nd Circuit Court of Appeals ruled against non-union workers in a case very similar to Beck involving the United Auto Workers.

=== Beck's complaint and lawsuit ===
In 1968, the Communications Workers of America (CWA) used union members' dues, in part, to support Vice President Hubert Humphrey's campaign for President of the United States and Senator Joseph Tydings' re-election campaign.

Harry Beck was a maintenance worker with the Chesapeake & Potomac Telephone Co. (C&PT) in Maryland and a CWA organizer. Beck protested the use of his union dues for a political cause in which he did not believe and asked for a refund. The CWA refused, arguing that using union dues for political expenditures was appropriate and legal. In the early 1970s, after disagreeing with national CWA officials over a union organizing drive in suburban Baltimore, Maryland, Beck resigned from the union and began to pay the $10-a-month agency fee. Beck continued to protest the use of his agency fee for political purposes, and asked the CWA to provide a more accurate accounting of how much money it spent on politics. The union refused. In June 1976, Beck and 19 other non-union members of the CWA's bargaining unit at C&PT sued the union for a refund. The National Right to Work Legal Defense Foundation provided legal counsel and support to Beck and the other 18 workers. Beck quit C&PT in 1979 and moved to Oregon, where he worked at CWA-organized job at American Telephone & Telegraph and continued to pay his agency fee.

The issue of agency fee payments was a national and serious one. By 1984, about 5 percent of employees at work sites covered by a union contract had opted not to join the union and instead pay an agency fee. In 1987, the same number of workers covered by CWA contracts were agency fee payers. At the time of the Beck case in 1987, a majority of unions had set the agency fee about equal to full union dues. More than 90 percent of all collective bargaining agreements (covering six million workers) made under the authority of the NLRA contained an agency fee provision.

=== Prior disposition ===
U.S. District Court Judge James R. Miller, Jr. ruled in favor of Beck and the 19 other co-plaintiffs in March 1983. Beck et al. claimed that CWA had not only breached its duty of fair representation but had also violated the agency fee payers' First Amendment rights as enunciated by the Supreme Court in Railway Employes' Dept. v. Hanson. Applying the clear and convincing evidence standard, the district court found that CWA could not show that 21 percent of the agency fee was spent on collective bargaining purposes alone, ordered an immediate refund of all dues collected since January 1976, and directed CWA to establish a record-keeping system which segregated collective bargaining and non-collective bargaining accounts. The refund was about $5,000 for all 20 workers.

CWA (and many other unions) quickly implemented a time-and-expenditures accounting system to meet the court's order. CWA also appealed the ruling.

United States Court of Appeals for the Fourth Circuit agreed to hear CWA's appeal in November 1984, and handed down its ruling in October 1985. In a 2-to-1 ruling, the appellate court upheld the district court's ruling. The 4th Circuit Court found that the district court had erred in applying the clear and convincing standard, but on the basis of a statutory interpretation of the NLRA and the duty of fair representation claim found that the district court had correctly concluded that the agency fee was being illegally spent on items not related to collective bargaining. CWA petitioned for a rehearing en banc, which was granted in April 1986. In a per curiam decision issued in September 1986, the 10 judges ruled 6-to-4 that the court had jurisdiction over the case on one or more grounds. The majority also held that the three-judge panel had ruled correctly, and held in favor of Beck again. CWA appealed again.

The U.S. Supreme Court granted certiorari on May 31, 1987. In a surprising move, the U.S. Department of Justice supported CWA's appeal. The Solicitor General at the time, Charles Fried, argued that the voluntary nature of collective bargaining agreements (including agency fee clauses) made the issue of coercion moot. Because states could and did ban agency fee agreements, there was no governmental action on which to base a constitutional claim against the union. And because Section 8(a)3 plainly requires uniform dues and fees (e.g., unions could not charge agency fee payers more nor less than regular members), the Justice Department felt Beck's claim was unjustified. Upset by the Justice Department's stand, Republican Senators Jesse Helms, Dan Quayle, Steve Symms, and Strom Thurmond filed an amicus curiae brief urging the Supreme Court to rule in Beck's favor.

The Beck case was argued before the Supreme Court on January 11, 1988.

At the time, however, there was a concern that the court could split and issue no ruling. Associate Justice Lewis F. Powell, Jr. had retired from the Supreme Court on June 26, 1987. President Ronald Reagan nominated Judge Robert Bork of the United States Court of Appeals for the District of Columbia to fill Powell's seat on July 1, but after a contentious nomination battle the U.S. Senate rejected Bork's nomination 58-to-42 on October 23. Six days later, President Reagan nominated Douglas H. Ginsburg, Bork's fellow judge on the D.C. circuit court of appeals, for the Supreme Court. But Ginsburg withdrew his nomination eight days later after media reports that he had occasionally smoked marijuana as a law student and law professor. Reagan nominated Anthony Kennedy, a judge on the United States Court of Appeals for the Ninth Circuit, for the high court on November 11, 1987. Kennedy was unanimously confirmed on February 3, 1988. Kennedy had been unable to participate in oral argument in the Beck case, and Supreme Court tradition holds that a justice who has not participated in oral argument cannot participate in the decision a case (with only a few, rare exceptions).

== Ruling ==
Associate Justice William J. Brennan, Jr. delivered the opinion of the Court, joined by Chief Justice William Rehnquist and Associate Justices Byron White, Thurgood Marshall, and John Paul Stevens. Associate Justices Harry Blackmun, Sandra Day O'Connor, and Antonin Scalia joined in Parts I and II. Justice Blackmun filed a concurring opinion in part and a dissenting opinion in part, in which Justices O'Connor and Scalia joined. Associate Justice Anthony Kennedy took no part in the consideration or decision of the case.

The 20 workers sought relief on three claims: 1) That the agency fee was too high to cover only collective bargaining activities as authorized by NLRA Section 8(a)(3); 2) That the high agency fee breached the CWA's duty of fair representation; and 3) That the high agency fee violated the workers' First Amendment rights.

Justice Brennan first addressed the jurisdictional question that divided the 4th Circuit Court of Appeals and asserted court jurisdiction over both the duty of fair representation and constitutional challenges.

Brennan next turned to the workers' first two claims. The majority noted that NLRA Section 8(a)(3) contains two provisions which clearly permit agency fee agreements. For the majority, "The statutory question presented in this case, then, is whether this 'financial core' includes the obligation to support union activities beyond those germane to collective bargaining, contract administration, and grievance adjustment. We think it does not." The majority reviewed the Court's previous decision in Machinists v. Street and found it controlling. The majority further concluded that Section 8(a)(3) and Section 2, Eleventh of the Railway Labor Act were statutorily equivalent. The majority reviewed at length the legislative history of both the Railway Labor Act and the National Labor Relations Act to provide support for this conclusion, and to show why in each case Congress had approved of agency fee agreements. Relying on the Court's analysis of the Railway Labor Act in Street, the Supreme Court said CWA was not justified in concluding that Section 8(a)(3) permits the collection of agency fees in excess of the amount necessary to cover the costs of collective bargaining. The majority further found that the legislative history of the NLRA, the Taft-Hartley Act, and the Railway Labor Act (RLA) showed that Congress intended to restrict agency fee agreements to cover collective bargaining alone and no other purposes.

Turning to the constitutional question, Brennan wrestled with the fact that "... in Railway Employees v. Hanson, 351 U.S. 225 (1956), [the Court held] that because the RLA pre-empts all state laws banning union-security agreements, the negotiation and enforcement of such provisions in railroad industry contracts involves 'governmental action' and is therefore subject to constitutional limitations." The question before the Court in Beck, then, was whether such governmental action extended to the acts of unions in the private sector where there was no such federal pre-emption. CWA argued that because Section 14(b) of the NLRA permits each state make its own choice in this regard, there could be no federal pre-emption and thus no governmental action. Brennan concluded for the majority that the Supreme Court need not decide the issue: The Court's doctrine was to rule narrowly on grounds of statutory construction where possible, and that issue had already been decided on statutory grounds in the workers' favor.

The Supreme Court affirmed the judgment of 4th Circuit Court of Appeals.

=== Dissent ===
Associate Justice Blackmun, joined by Justices O'Connor and Scalia, concurred with the majority's assertion of jurisdiction in Part I of the ruling and with the majority's decision in the breach of duty of fair representation claim in Part II, but dissented from Part III and the holding in Part IV. For Blackmun, the problem was that the majority had relied too heavily on Street, not utilized its traditional methods of statutory construction, and substituted a new method of statutory construction to "strain" to make Beck accord with Street:

Without the decision in Machinists v. Street, 367 U.S. 740 (1961), involving the Railway Labor Act (RLA), the Court could not reach the result it does today. Our accepted mode of resolving statutory questions would not lead to a construction of 8(a)(3) so foreign to that section's express language and legislative history, which show that Congress did not intend to limit either the amount of "agency fees" (or what the majority labels "dues-equivalents") a union may collect under a union-security agreement, or the union's expenditure of such funds. The Court's excessive reliance on Street to reach a contrary conclusion is manifested by its unique line of reasoning. No sooner is the language of 8(a)(3) intoned, than the Court abandons all attempt at construction of this statute and leaps to its interpretation over a quarter century ago of another statute enacted by a different Congress, a statute with a distinct history and purpose. See ante, at 744–745. I am unwilling to offend our established doctrines of statutory construction and strain the meaning of the language used by Congress in 8(a)(3), simply to conform 8(a)(3)'s construction to the Court's interpretation of similar language in a different later-enacted statute, an interpretation which is itself "not without its difficulties". Abood v. Detroit Board of Education, 431 U.S. 209, 232 (1977) (characterizing the Court's decision in Street). I therefore dissent from Parts III and IV of the Court's opinion.

Blackmun then applied a plain meaning construction of the statutory language to both the RLA and NLRA, and concluded that CWA had not violated the NLRA. The NLRB, Blackmun said, had not changed its policy on agency fees nor its justifications for its conclusions. Justice Blackmun pointed to the NLRB's decision in In re Union Starch & Refining Co. and Detroit Mailers Union No. 40, and noted that the Justice Department had adopted a similar view in its amicus curiae brief. Blackmun also chastised the majority for mis-stating the NLRB's conclusion in Teamsters Local 959:

Contrary to the Court's suggestion, the NLRB has not embraced and then "repudiated" the view that, for purposes of § 8(a)(3), "periodic dues and initiation fees" mean only "those fees necessary to finance collective-bargaining activities". Ante, at 752, n. 7. Teamsters Local No. 959, 167 N. L. R. B. 1042 (1967), does not demonstrate otherwise. In Teamsters Local, the NLRB held that "working dues" designated to fund a union building program and a credit union were actually "assessments" not contemplated by the proviso to § 8(a)(3). Id., at 1044. The Board found that the union itself regarded the levy as a "temporary assessment", clearly distinct from its "regular dues". Ibid. Moreover, because the financing for the programs was constructed in such a way that the union treasury might never have received 90% of the moneys, the Board concluded that the "working dues" were actually "special purposes funds", and that "the support of such funds cannot come from 'periodic dues' as that term is used in § 8(a)(3)". Ibid. In Detroit Mailers, the NLRB distinguished such assessments from "periodic and uniformly required" dues, which, in its view, a union is not precluded from demanding of nonmembers pursuant to § 8(a)(3). 192 N. L. R. B., at 952.

Blackmun noted that "the majority cannot cite one case in which the Board has held that uniformly required, periodic dues used for purposes other than 'collective bargaining' are not dues within the meaning of §8(a)(3).

Like the majority, Blackmun too extensively reviewed the history of the RLA and NLRA but rejected the majority's reading of those histories. The Supreme Court had previously held that the RLA was not identical to the NLRA, he wrote, and had cautioned lower courts and appellants that they should draw parallels between the two statutes very carefully. The majority, Blackmun concluded, had not made a careful comparison this time, and therefore its conclusions based on the similarities between the RLA and NLRA should be rejected.

== Critiques of the Beck ruling ==
A number of criticisms have been made of the Beck ruling. These critiques include those made by supporters of the decision who feel the Supreme Court did not go far enough, and critiques made by those who feel the Court's ruling was wrongly decided.

A number of legal scholars who support the outcome of the ruling nonetheless criticize the Supreme Court's approach to Beck's First Amendment challenge. These scholars strongly criticize the Court for not deciding the case on First Amendment grounds, and argue that a constitutional ruling on agency fee issues (rather than a statutory ruling) would provide for clearer decisions, a sounder basis for workers to challenge agency fee calculations, and enhanced free speech rights not only for dissenting workers but for all employees.

A second major criticism of the case is that the Court did not clearly define how the First Amendment had been violated. (The Supreme Court has a long-standing doctrine of not ruling on a statute's constitutionality if a case may be decided on statutory grounds.) The Beck court's discussion of First Amendment issues was perfunctory, acknowledging that there might be grounds for a First Amendment challenge but refusing to discuss the issue further. This has generated confusion among legal scholars and workers as to what First Amendment challenges may be brought. For example, critics have pointed out that a claim under the First Amendment can only be brought when there is state action, as opposed to private action. The Supreme Court's early agency fee decisions (Hanson, Street, and Ellis) found that state action occurred under the Railway Labor Act because the Act prohibited union shops. Yet, although the Court went to great lengths to identify the similarities between the RLA and NLRA in Beck, the Court (in dicta) refused to decide whether state action had occurred under the NLRA. Legal scholars have pointed out that the Beck Court cited two cases which did find state action under the NLRA, but did not make any determination in Beck. One scholar has concluded that the Court's tests for determining state action are not useful enough to determine the issue. Adding to the confusion is that the Supreme Court has never made it clear how to apply a First Amendment analysis to labor law. The Court and legal scholars point out that labor law is considered unique in the American statutory and constitutional framework, which may mean that traditional First Amendment analyses do not apply. "[T]he Court consistently has upheld the validity ... of the Labor Act. In doing so, the Court has repeatedly referred to the special nature of labor legislation to explain its unusual deference to a statute so incompatible with judicially developed constitutional norms." It may be that the Court's existing standard for assessing government interference with speech (the strict scrutiny standard) is inappropriate to apply to labor law. Many of these analyses conclude that the Beck court should have clarified these issues, and absent such clarification the First Amendment rights of workers remain unprotected.

Third, some legal scholars have criticized the ruling for not establishing a right which can be successfully exercised in the real world. The Supreme Court itself recognized in Abood that implementing its limitations on agency fees would be difficult to administer, and in dicta suggested that further rulings would clarify its thinking. But the Beck decision did not provide this clarification. The ruling did not address whether or how unions should inform workers of their Beck rights, what charges are "germane" to collective bargaining, or what remedies non-members have if their rights are violated. Because of this confusion, some lower courts have gone so far as to approve schemes whereby union members may assert their Beck rights only during limited "window periods" (in apparent contravention of Pattern Makers) and that Beck objectors renew their objection annually (in apparent contravention of General Motors). A U.S. government report has concluded that it is uncertain whether notifying employees of their Beck rights but not other rights available under the NLRA would effectively protect workers' rights.

Other observers conclude that Beck was wrongly decided, but give varying reasons for reaching this conclusion. Some critics, in reviewing the Supreme Court's First Amendment jurisprudence, have found that there simply is no First Amendment burden imposed by an agency fee which includes charges not related to collective bargaining. Others conclude that while there may be some infringement on free speech, the voluntary nature of collective bargaining does not raise it to the level of state action under existing Supreme Court doctrine. Many conclusions about state action rely on the fact that the NLRA grants unions the right to charge agency fees, thus making the union a state actor. But scholars critical of Beck point to the Court's ruling in Jackson v. Metropolitan Edison Co., where the Supreme Court held that even a governmental grant of power is insufficient to create state action. At least one commentator has concluded that the Court's First Amendment analysis in Beck is unbalanced because it fails to take into account the associational liberties also protected by the First Amendment.

Fifth, some analyses conclude that the Court's method of statutory interpretation in Beck is flawed. Justice Blackmun made this claim in his dissent (as noted above). Some legal commentators agree, noting that the ruling rejects the Court's well-settled doctrines of statutory construction, which leads to a misinterpretation of Congress' legislative intent.

Sixth, critics have argued that the Beck Court misapplied its duty of fair representation doctrine. One legal commentator has concluded that the Supreme Court's duty of fair representation decisions do not lead to the conclusion that agency fees can be restricted solely to collective bargaining purposes. Another has argued that modern labor unions can only meet their duty to fairly represent workers if they engage in lobbying and legislative activity, a conclusion which undercuts the Beck court's decision as well.

Seventh, some scholars point out that the Beck ruling may lead to unanticipated outcomes. At least one commentary on Beck concludes that Beck rights, if successfully implemented, might lead large numbers of workers to resign from a union during a strike. Workers adopting that strategy would be able to continue to work during a strike (incurring none of the disadvantages a strike would bring them), and yet still enjoy the benefits of collective bargaining (assuming the strike is successful and an agreement is negotiated). The strike is the most powerful weapon unions have, and undermining the union's ability to strike would put labor unions at a distinct disadvantage in collective bargaining. The NLRB and Supreme Court have acknowledged the role that agency fee payers can play in undermining strikes. In NLRB v. Textile Workers Union, 409 U.S. 213 (1972), the Supreme Court ruled that once a union member had resigned, the union could not punish that worker for crossing picket lines. And in Pattern Makers' League v. NLRB, (as noted above) the Court said unions must permit members to resign at any time. Decisions like these have informed the NLRB's rulings on the issue as well. The Board found that an employer did not commit an unfair labor practice when it distributed notices to employees prior to a strike that outlined an employee's rights during a strike (including the right to become an agency fee payer and cross picket lines). The Board also held that, once a single employee has inquired about their right to become an agency fee payer, it is legal for an employer to notify all workers about this right. But in the absence of an employee-initiated iniquiry, it is not, the Board says, legal for employers to approach striking workers and ask them to become agency fee payers. Some argue that widespread worker resignation from unions prior to or during a strike has clear negative implications. This may be changing, however, as more unions turn away from strikes and toward comprehensive campaigns. It is also unclear how Beck may impact dues checkoff (an agreement between employer, union, and employee under which the employer agrees to deduct union dues directly from the employee's paycheck and turn it over to the union). In 1991, the NLRB held that dues checkoff agreements create an obligation to pay dues in the same way that becoming a union member does. It is possible that Beck and subsequent rulings could also undermine dues checkoff agreements.

== Impact ==
=== Further Supreme Court rulings ===
The Beck case created widespread confusion about how best to implement the rights the Supreme Court identified in its ruling. The Supreme Court has addressed the agency fee issue six times in the two decades since its holding in Beck, each ruling considering additional union expenditures which may or may not be charged to non-union members.

The Court first revisited the issue in Lehnert v. Ferris Faculty Association in 1991. The Court was "sharply divided", writing "four opinions that were supported in whole or in part by varying numbers of Justices" and citing divergent reasons for supporting those parts of the decision they supported. "[A]ll nine Justices rejected a broader argument put forward by the objecting employees that the employees should not have to pay for activities of the national union ... that were not undertaken directly on behalf of the ... bargaining unit." Eight justices agreed that unions could not charge agency fee payers for lobbying activities. But on other issues, the court split. The case was more difficult to adjudicate because it involved state action (the bargaining unit was composed of public employees) and thus brought First Amendment issues into consideration and because of the unique nature of the union's dues structure. Writing for the majority, Justice Blackmun established a three-prong test for determining the constitutionality and statutory legality of agency fee charges in public employee bargaining units: 1) The charges must be "germane" to collective bargaining activity; 2) The charges must not "significantly" burden the non-members' free speech rights; and 3) Charges must be justified by the need for labor peace or to avoid the free rider problem. Acceptable charges included that part of affiliation fees which are spent on collective bargaining, collective bargaining expenditures destined for other states, expenditures for national union publications insofar as they support collective bargaining, information services and other miscellaneous items that are not political nor public in nature and which benefit of all workers even though they do not directly impact the bargaining unit, expenditures to attend union meetings and conventions, and strike expenses (whether the strike is legal or not). Non-chargeable expenses include: Lobbying, electoral, or other political activities not directly related to contract bargaining or implementation; political or public activities aimed at winning a greater budget for the collective bargaining unit; litigation or publications reporting on litigation that does not concern directly concern the bargaining unit; and public relations efforts (including informational picketing, media purchases, signs, posters, and buttons) designed to enhance public respect for the workers' profession. At least one legal scholar believes the Lehnert decision shifted away from the Court's traditional rationale that agency fees must have a strong link to collective bargaining purposes:

Subtly, but with significant impact ..., the Supreme Court in Lehnert shifted away from its previous emphasis on the nexus between the expense and collective bargaining. Unlike its predecessors, Lehnert did not stress that the benefit to the unit must be in the area of collective bargaining or labor-management issues. Its statement that for an expense to be charged "there must be some indication that the payment is for services that may ultimately enure to the benefit of the members of the local union" implies that the benefit to the worker need not be in the form of increased leverage against the employer.

Adding additional confusion, the Lehnert court also concluded that even charges germane to collective bargaining were impermissible if they burdened First Amendment rights too heavily in order to achieve the policy outcomes intended by Congress (although the Court did not identify what constituted an impermissible level of burden). The impact of Lehnert, however, appears minimal. At least one legal scholar refused to list Lehnert among the past decade's most important cases in the public education law. Both courts and legal scholars have questioned whether the judicial system should be "drawn into this micro-level of dispute resolution".

Other Supreme Court rulings since Lehnert have focused more narrowly on technical issues. In Air Line Pilots Association v. Miller, 523 U.S. 866 (1998), the Supreme Court addressed the issue of whether non-members must use the union's arbitration process in order to challenge the calculation of agency fees. In a 7-to-2 decision, the Court held that agency fee payers did not have to exhaust the union's challenge procedures. The same year, the Court addressed the issue of whether a union committed an unfair labor practice if its collective bargaining agreement contained the original NLRA language on union shops but no additional information (such as information about the Supreme Court's rulings in Beck and other cases). A unanimous Supreme Court held in Marquez v. Screen Actors Guild, 525 U.S. 33 (1998) that a union did not breach its duty of fair representation by merely including the language of the NLRA, as amended. The Marquez Court relied heavily on its ruling in NLRB v. News Syndicate Co., 365 U.S. 695 (1961), where it had previously held that the NLRB had no authority invalidate a contract clause solely because the clause mirrored statutory language but did not go further to advise members to not violate the law. About a decade later, the high court revisited the agency fee issue three more times. It upheld in Davenport v. Washington Education Association, 551 U.S. 177 (2007), a Washington state ballot initiative which required public employee unions to obtain each member's and nonmember's prior authorization before spend their dues or agency fees for election-related purposes. The decision was moot even before it was handed down, because the Washington State Legislature had already changed the law to make it easier for unions to comply. The ruling was very narrowly decided, however, leading to much criticism. "Correctly understood, this decision promises little and delivers even less because it fails to deal decisively and comprehensively with the issues that both earlier private sector and public sector union dues disputes illuminated but failed to settle." Other legal scholars expressed dismay that the Davenport Court did not confront the First Amendment issues raised by the case. A year later, in Locke v. Karass, 07-610 (2008), the Supreme Court held that it was not unconstitutional for a local union to charge nonmembers for national litigation expenses unrelated to local collective bargaining activities. In 2009, the Supreme Court held in Ysursa v. Pocatello Education Association, 07-869 (2009), that a state's refusal to agree to dues checkoff did not abridge a union's First Amendment rights.

=== Regulatory and NLRB actions ===
On April 13, 1992, President George H. W. Bush issued an executive order, E.O. 12800, that required contractors doing business with the federal government to provide their non-union employees with notice of their Beck rights. Executive branch officials estimated that about 2 million to 3 million (10.5 percent to 15.8 percent) of the 19 million workers represented by labor unions are nonmembers, and that NLRB officials had issued more than 300 citations accusing unions of not notifying their members of their Beck rights. Labor leaders dismissed the Executive Order, claiming they already met the requirements set down by the Supreme Court. The Bush administration estimated the Executive Order would keep $1.2 billion to $2.4 billion a year from being collected by labor unions. The administration also said it would order the U.S. Department of Labor (DOL) to issue new regulations that would require unions to report in far greater detail the amount of money they spend on political activities, lobbying, and collective bargaining. Bush also asked Congress to enact legislation formally encoding the Beck ruling into federal labor law. Unions and Democrats derided the action as election year politicking, while right-to-work advocates hailed it as long overdue. At least one legal scholar criticized the order for not doing enough to implement the Beck decision, and for putting the onus of notification on the employer rather than the union.

The Clinton, Bush, and Obama administrations have each taken action to either rescind or reinstate this Executive Order. President Bill Clinton issued Executive Order 12836 on February 1, 1993, which revoked Executive Order 12800. The Labor Department subsequently withdrew its Bush-era regulations on union financial reporting on December 21, 1993. President George W. Bush then issued Executive Order 13201 on February 16, 2001, largely reinstating Executive Order 12800 and ordering DOL to re-issue its regulations. A coalition of unions sued to enjoin enforcement of the Executive Order. The United States district court for the District of Columbia overturned the Executive Order on the grounds that the NLRA gave the NLRB exclusive jurisdiction over Beck rights, but the D.C. Circuit Court of Appeals reversed, the Supreme Court refused to hear the case, and Executive Order 13201 went into effect. The last action was taken on January 30, 2009, when President Barack Obama issued Executive Order 13496, revoking E.O. 13201 and the DOL regulations yet again.

The National Labor Relations Board (NLRB) struggled to implement the Court's holding in Beck. In 1989, the National Right to Work Committee polled NLRB offices nationwide, posing as workers and asking about the requirement to pay union dues. The group found that Board agents and other staff at 22 of 29 offices gave the wrong information. Although the NLRB initially dismissed the report, within a few weeks the agency admitted its errors and ordered all its regional offices to review recent developments in labor law and provide accurate information on agency fee rights.

In 1992, for only the second time in its history, the National Labor Relations Board undertook a regulatory rulemaking aimed at resolving the divergent, complex issues raised by the Beck decision. The proposed rulemaking was announced in May 1992, and the proposed rule issued on September 22, 1992. But after three and a half years of inaction on the proposed regulation, the Board withdrew the rule on March 19, 1996—concluding that it could proceed faster through its more traditional case-by-case approach.

Shortly after the labor board published its proposed rule, it issued its first ruling addressing the issues raised in the Beck decision. In Electrical Workers IUE, Local 444 (Paramax Systems), 311 NLRB 1031 (1993), the Board held that Beck imposed a duty on unions to provide information on members' and nonmembers' Beck rights via the mail at least once a year, whether an employee has requested the information or not. But over the next several years, the NLRB ruled on almost no other Beck cases even though nearly 400 complaints had been brought before the Board.

Finally, the Board consolidated 28 Beck cases under California Saw & Knife Works, 320 NLRB 224 (1995). The International Association of Machinists and Aerospace Workers (IAM) provided a Beck notification to each member yearly via its monthly magazine, and required members to exercise these rights once a year during a window period. The Board held that the union had committed an unfair labor practice by failing to provide a Beck rights notice to new members and by not providing a Beck rights notice to new members who were resigning from the union but had not yet received the annual notice, but did not commit a ULP by failing to notify resigning union members of their Beck rights at the time of their resignation. The Board distinguished its holding in California Saw from its prior ruling in Paramax Systems, and found the window period (as well as other restrictions on the submission of resignation and objector status) to be an unfair labor practice. The Board rejected numerous challenges to the way agency fees were calculated, challenges made, and expenditures verified. The California Saw decision was criticized for only applying to nonmembers. The NLRB addressed the Beck rights of members shortly thereafter in United Paperworkers International Union, Local 1033 (Weyerhauser Paper Co.), 320 NLRB 349 (1995). In that case, the NLRB upheld its ruling in California Saw and said that yearly notice to current members, including the rights outlined by the courts and NLRB (not just the statutory language of the NLRA), was all that was required of unions.

Two years later, the NLRB decided on the preferred remedy that should be imposed where a union failed to inform employees of their Beck rights. In Rochester Manufacturing Co., 323 NLRB 260 (1997), the Board ordered that the union return to the status quo ante, give all workers their Beck rights notice, give each all workers the opportunity to submit agency fee calculation objections for every dues collection period at issue, and the reimburse each objecting employee.

From 1994 to 1998, the NLRB issued 18 consolidated or single Beck cases.

=== Legislative efforts ===
The Supreme Court's Beck decision generated a great deal of legislative activity at both the federal and state levels.

==== Congressional action ====
The first Congressional attempt to codify the Beck decision into law occurred a year after the Beck decision. Representative Tom DeLay introduced H.R. 2589, the "Workers' Political Rights Act of 1989", on June 8, 1989. The bill, which died in committee, would have amended the Federal Election Campaign Act of 1971 to: 1) Add union political committees to the list of political action committees regulated by the Federal Election Commission; 2) Require unions to give each worker separate, yearly Beck notices; 3) Require unions to give each worker Beck notices when they join the union and when they resign from the union; 4) Require unions to undergo independent audits each year to verify the calculation of agency fees; and 5) Require unions to provide members detailed information on the calculation of agency fees.

Additional action followed over the next several years. In July 1990, Senator Orrin Hatch proposed an amendment to the "Senatorial Election Campaign Act of 1989" (S. 137), a major campaign finance reform bill then under consideration in the U.S. Senate. The Hatch amendment was defeated on a close vote of 59-to-41. Senator David Boren then proposed a less restrictive amendment to S. 137, which was adopted by a vote of 57 to 43. Although the amended bill passed the Senate on August 1, 1990, it was never referred to the House and died at the end of the congressional session. DeLay reintroduced his Beck bill in 1991, where it died again without action. In 1996, Representative Harris W. Fawell introduced the "Worker Right to Know Act" (H.R. 3580), a bill to amend the NLRA to ban unions from charging any worker (member or nonomember) fees unrelated to collective bargaining, contract administration, or grievance adjustment unless the worker gave the union explicit, annual consent. Hearings on the legislation occurred, but the bill died in committee. In 1997, Senator Paul Coverdell introduced a bill (S. 497, the "National Right to Work Act of 1997") which would have banned all compulsory union membership. Introduced in the House as well, both bills died in committee.

The last major push for congressional action came in 1996–1997. Several bills had been introduced in both the House and the Senate. The most prominent was Senator Don Nickles' "Paycheck Protection Act", which Senate Majority Leader Trent Lott re-introduced in 1998. The issue became caught in campaign finance reform legislation that year. Section 501 of the "Bipartisan Campaign Reform Act of 1997" (BRCA) merely codified the Beck decision, but the "Paycheck Protection Act" went much further and required all workers to affirm on an annual basis whether their dues could be used for political purposes. Senator Lott offered the Nickles bill as an amendment to the BRCA, which many Democrats (and some Republicans) saw as a poison pill amendment. Under procedures adopted by the Senate, Senators would need to reject the Lott amendment before voting on the BRCA. But with Republicans unwilling to vote against the amendment (which was popular with their conservative base), the Lott amendment was added to the BRCA and the Beck amendment died along with the BRCA after a number of other procedural votes.

Several bills were offered in Congress over the next few years to either ban agency shop agreements or to adopt various provisions of the 1997 Nickles bill, but all of them died in committee. An analysis of the major bills under congressional consideration from 1988 to 1997 found, however, that nearly all of them suffered from significant legal flaws, and none went far enough in protecting workers' Beck rights.

==== State actions ====
Many states have proposed or passed legislation to address the Supreme Court's ruling in Beck for public employee unions. The National Labor Relations Act does not cover state or local public employees, and leaves it up to each state to grant these workers collective bargaining rights. By 2000, 28 states and the District of Columbia had enacted a collective bargaining law for some or all of their public employees. "Paycheck protection" acts—legislation requiring public employee unions to obtain permission from all workers on an annual basis in order to collect dues or fees for any purpose not germane to collective bargaining—were introduced in a number of state legislatures or became ballot initiatives. In 1992, voters in Washington state approved Initiative 134, the nation's first paycheck protection act. Similar ballot initiatives and legislation appeared in 26 states in 1998. The battle in California over that state's initiative, Proposition 226, was particularly important because supporters of the initiative believed a win there would lead to adoption of the proposal in many more states. But despite the support of Governor Pete Wilson and a lead of roughly 35 points in the polls in April, the initiative went down to defeat 52-to-48 on election day in June after a fierce battle.

The defeat of the initiative had a significant effect nationwide. Similar initiatives and legislation were defeated in 29 states by 2002. By September 2009, only five states had adopted the proposal via initiative or legislation (Idaho, Michigan, Ohio, Washington, and Wyoming), while a sixth (Colorado) had done so via executive order.

==== Legislative prospects ====
Prospects for addition initiatives and legislation at the federal and state level appear mixed as of 2009. Former Federal Election Commission Chair Bradley A. Smith (who opposes compulsory unionism) has argued that even the most stringent laws are unlikely to have any impact, as the number of agency fee payers is small compared to the number of union members. At least one legal scholar has questioned the constitutionality of paycheck protection laws, while another, detailed analysis of the Washington state effort has concluded that instead of decreasing the amount of union dues available for political expenditures paycheck protection actually increased it (from approximately $630,000 to approximately $780,000) as unions shifted member dues internally to account for the agency fees going toward collective bargaining.

== See also ==
- List of United States Supreme Court cases involving the First Amendment
- List of United States Supreme Court cases by the Rehnquist Court

== Sources ==
- Berman, Evan M.; Bowman, James S.; West, Jonathan P.; Wart, Montgomery Van (2006). Human Resource Management in Public Service: Paradoxes, Processes, and Problems (2nd ed.). SAGE. ISBN 978-1-4129-0421-6.
- Corrado, Anthony (1997). Campaign Finance Reform: A Sourcebook. Brookings Institution Press. ISBN 978-0-8157-1581-8.
- DelPo, Amy; Guerin, Lisa (2007). The Manager's Legal Handbook (4th ed.). Berkeley, CA: Nolo. ISBN 978-1-4133-0718-4.
- Green, John Clifford (1999). Financing the 1996 Election. M.E. Sharpe. ISBN 978-0-7656-0385-2.
- Green, Mark (2004). Selling Out: How Big Corporate Money Buys Elections, Rams Through Legislation, and Betrays Our Democracy. Harper Collins. ISBN 978-0-06-073582-1.
- Holley, William H.; Jennings, Kenneth M.; Wolters, Roger S. (2008). The Labor Relations Process. Cengage Learning. ISBN 978-0-324-42144-6.
- Kearney, Richard C.; Mareschal, Patrice M. (2000). Labor Relations in the Public Sector (3rd ed.). CRC Press. ISBN 978-0-8247-0420-9.
- Mauer, Michael (2001). The Union Member's Complete Guide: Everything You Want—and Need—to Know About Working Union. Union Communication Services. ISBN 978-0-9659486-1-6.
- Pynes, Joan E. (2004). Human Resources Management for Public and Nonprofit Organizations. Wiley. ISBN 978-0-7879-7078-9.
- Rees, Albert (1989). The Economics of Trade Unions. University of Chicago Press. ISBN 978-0-226-70710-5.
