= Davenport v. Washington Education Ass'n =

Davenport v. Washington Ed. Assoc.
- Supreme Court of the United States

Argued January 10, 2007 Decided June 14, 2007
- Full case name: Gary Davenport, et al., Appellant v. Washington Education Association
- Docket no.: 05-1589
- Citations: 551 U.S. 177 (more) 127 S. Ct. 2372; 168 L. Ed. 2d 71; 2007 U.S. LEXIS 7722

Case history
- Prior: Certiorari to the Supreme Court of Washington

Holding
- It does not violate the First Amendment for a State to require that its public-sector unions receive affirmative authorization from a nonmember before spending that nonmember's agency fees for election-related purposes.

Court membership
- Chief Justice John Roberts Associate Justices John P. Stevens · Antonin Scalia; Anthony Kennedy · David Souter; Clarence Thomas · Ruth Bader Ginsburg; Stephen Breyer · Samuel Alito

Case opinions
- Majority: Scalia, joined by unanimous (Parts I and II–A and the second paragraph of footnote 2); Stevens, Kennedy, Souter, Thomas, Ginsburg (remainder)
- Concurrence: Breyer (in part), joined by Roberts, Alito

Laws applied
- U.S. Const. amend. I; Washington Fair Campaign Practices Act § 760; National Labor Relations Act

Davenport v. Washington Education Association, 551 U.S. 177 (2007), is a ruling by the Supreme Court of the United States in which the Court held that it does not violate the First Amendment for a state to require its public-sector unions to receive affirmative authorization from a non-member before spending that nonmember's agency fees for election-related purposes.

== Background of the case ==
The National Labor Relations Act, as amended, allows unions to require that non-union members pay agency fees to cover collective bargaining costs and prevent free rider problems. The Supreme Court has ruled in a number of cases that requiring non-members to pay agency fees is both constitutional and legal, provided a number of conditions are met. In Railway Employes' Dept. v. Hanson, 351 U.S. 225 (1956). the Court held that the agency shop provisions of the Railway Labor Act were constitutional, but withheld judgment as to "the validity or enforceability of a union or closed shop agreement if other conditions of union membership are imposed or if the exaction of dues, initiation fees or assessments is used as a cover for forcing ideological conformity or other action in contravention of the First or the Fifth Amendment." Five years later, in Machinists v. Street, 367 U.S. 740 (1961), the Court held that the Railway Labor Act "denies the authority to a union, over the employee's objection, to spend his money for political causes which he opposes."

The high court also confronted the issue of remedy (how can non-members challenge the calculation of agency fees) in Machinists v. Street, and outlined several options which unions and employers might adopt (as well as rejecting remedies which the district court in the case had chosen). Making its first private sector ruling in NLRB v. General Motors Corp., 373 U.S. 734 (1963), the Court held that agency fees equal to dues are not prohibited by the National Labor Relations Act. Nonetheless, in Retail Clerks v. Schermerhorn, 373 U.S. 746 (1963), the Court questioned whether an agency fee set at a level equal to member dues was unfair because it set collective bargaining fees higher for non-members than for members. After reargument, however, the Court in Retail Clerks v. Schermerhorn, 375 U.S. 96 (1963), did not reach the issue again and instead decided the case on narrow procedural grounds (concluding that Florida's right-to-work law outlawed the union shop provision at issue). The Court further elaborated on the issue of remedies in Railway Clerks v. Allen, 373 U.S. 113 (1963), allowing agency fee payers to opt out of all political expenditures rather than enunciate specific examples, but refusing to allow non-members to act as a class.

The Supreme Court extended its constitutional and equity analysis to public employees in Abood v. Detroit Board of Education, 431 U.S. 209 (1977) (since overturned in 2018, see Janus v. AFSCME), holding that, where public employee collective bargaining exists and agency fee clauses are clearly authorized by law, public employee agency fee mechanisms also are constitutional. In Ellis v. Railway Clerks, 466 U.S. 435 (1984), the Supreme Court concluded that the agency fee may only cover those activities directly related to the union's role as a collective bargaining representative. These included national conventions (where dues levels were set and union programs debated and established), social activities (which enhanced union solidarity, especially during negotiations), grievance handling, contract negotiation costs, and union communications, but excluded union organizing activities. The Court in Ellis also wrestled with the issue of rebates, and concluded that a union could not simply rebate agency fees to workers for that would essentially constitute a forced, interest-free loan from the worker to the union.

In 1985, the Court held in Pattern Makers v. NLRB, 473 U.S. 95, that a union member may resign at any time without notice. Pattern Makers further undermined the union shop by giving workers the right to resign from the union at any time and incur no penalty (such as termination). The Court also crafted additional rules regarding agency fees in Teachers v. Hudson, 475 U.S. 292 (1986). In Teachers, the union had failed to minimize the risk that agency fees might be used for impermissible purposes and had failed to provide agency fee payers with adequate information about how the agency fee was calculated. Now the Supreme Court imposed a third requirement, that agency fee payers must be offered a timely, fair, and objective mechanism for challenging the computation of agency fees. The Court did uphold, however, the use of interest-bearing escrow accounts for holding disputed dues.

In 1992, voters in the state of Washington approved a ballot initiative that requires unions to receive permission from non-union members to use their fees to support political campaigns. This included getting each person's approval even for soft money expenditures, an issue not previously covered in Supreme Court rulings. Gary Davenport, a non-union member and state worker, and other state employees sued, contending that the union failed to secure their approval before spending their agency fees on political efforts.

A lawsuit was filed against the Washington Education Association by Washington Attorney General Christine Gregoire. The Thurston County, Washington Superior Court ruled that the union had to pay $590,375 in fines for intentionally violating the Washington statute. On appeal, the Washington Court of Appeals ruled 2-1 that section 760 of the Washington Fair Campaign Practices Act had violated the First Amendment of the Constitution by placing the speech of union members as more valuable than teachers. However, the case was then appealed to the Washington Supreme Court, which ruled in favor of the union stating that the law was unconstitutional because it placed too large of an administrative burden on the union. Therefore, non-union members could not prevent the union from using their money for political campaign purposes.

In 2006, the United States Supreme Court agreed to hear the case. Oral argument was held on January 10, 2007, and the Court reached a decision on June 14, 2007.

== The court's decision ==
Justice Antonin Scalia wrote the decision for a unanimous Court, and overturned the previous Washington Supreme Court's ruling. Justice Scalia outlined two reasons why the Court believed that the Washington statute was constitutional:

1. Using the Court precedents established by Abood and Teachers, the Court argues that the Washington Supreme Court misinterpreted the Supreme Court's reasoning in those previous rulings. The Washington Supreme Court argued that the clause "dissent is not to be presumed—it must affirmatively be made known to the union by the dissenting employee." in Hudson demonstrates First Amendment partiality to one group (the petitioners) and marginalizes the unions understood freedom of expression. Justice Scalia argues that the Court misinterpreted the ruling, and in fact, voters can limit the entitlement that unions have to collect and use non-members funds.
2. The Washington statute was not unconstitutional because of the distinction between public and private sector unions. The unions violated the extent of the non-members free speech because they were using tax-payers dollars to fund political election campaigns. This limitation of the union's free speech protection is not content based, argues Justice Scalia. The voters of Washington passed a law that prevents the government from "acting in a capacity other than as regulator." Therefore, it does not threaten the "marketplace of ideas" that the First Amendment seeks to protect.

=== Breyer's concurrence ===
In a concurring opinion, Justice Stephen Breyer agreed with all aspects of Justice Scalia's opinion except for the respondent's arguments that had not been raised in lower courts. This criticism is one of procedure and not content. Justice Breyer believed that the lower courts should have addressed these arguments before they were heard by the Supreme Court.

== Impact ==
The Davenport ruling was moot the moment it was issued, for the Washington state legislature had, before the ruling was handed down, changed the law to make it far easier for unions to comply with its provisions.

Nonetheless, legal scholars have been highly critical of the Supreme Court's ruling in Davenport. As one legal scholar (who is highly critical of the agency fee), has said, "Correctly understood, this decision promises little and delivers even less because it fails to deal decisively and comprehensively with the issues that both earlier private sector and public sector union dues disputes illuminated but failed to settle." Other legal scholars have criticized Justice Scalia's judicial reasoning in Davenport, concluding that he should have ruled solely on First Amendment grounds and overturned the agency fee law entirely.

== See also ==
- List of United States Supreme Court cases by the Roberts Court
- List of United States Supreme Court cases involving the First Amendment
