= Marquez v. Screen Actors Guild Inc. =

- Supreme Court of the United States

Argued October 5, 1998 Decided November 3, 1998
- Full case name: Naomi Marquez, Petitioner v. Screen Actors Guild, Incorporated, et al.
- Citations: 525 U.S. 33 (more) 119 S. Ct. 292; 142 L. Ed. 2d 242; 1998 U.S. LEXIS 7110; 67 U.S.L.W. 4001; 136 Lab. Cas. (CCH) ¶ 10,274; 159 L.R.R.M. 2641; 98 Cal. Daily Op. Service 8181; 98 Daily Journal DAR 11327

Case history
- Prior: On writ of cert. to the United States Court of Appeals for the Ninth Circuit
- Subsequent: None

Holding
- The union (SAG) did not breach its duty of fair representation merely by negotiating a union security clause that uses the language derived from the NLRA § 8(a)(3) without explaining in the contract agreement the Court's interpretation of that language.

Court membership
- Chief Justice William Rehnquist Associate Justices John P. Stevens · Sandra Day O'Connor; Antonin Scalia · Anthony Kennedy; David Souter · Clarence Thomas; Ruth Bader Ginsburg · Stephen Breyer

Case opinions
- Majority: O'Connor, joined by unanimous
- Concurrence: Kennedy, joined by Thomas

Laws applied
- National Labor Relations Act

Marquez v. Screen Actors Guild Inc., 525 U.S. 33 (1998), was a United States Supreme Court decision involving the validity of a union shop contract.

== Background ==
The petitioner Naomi Marquez is a part-time actress who successfully auditioned for a one-line role in Medicine Ball, a television series produced by Lakeside Productions. Pursuant to the union agreement Lakeside Productions had with the Screen Actors Guild (SAG), Lakeside contacted the SAG to verify that Marquez met the requirements of the union security clause.

It turns out that Marquez had previously worked in the motion picture industry for more than 30 days, thus the union security clause was triggered and Marquez was required to pay union fees before she could work at Lakeside.

The petitioner tried to negotiate with the SAG which would allow her to pay the union fees after she completed her work with Lakeside. The negotiations did not result in any compromise. On the day the part was supposed to be filmed, Marquez still had not paid her union dues and fees. Lakeside hired a different actress to fill in the part. At some point afterwards, the SAG faxed a letter to Lakeside that it had no objections to the petitioner working in the production, but it was too late for filming had already started on schedule with the replacement actress.

The petitioner filed a suit against the SAG and Lakeside claiming that they had breached its duty of fair representation by negotiating and enforcing a union security clause that used language from NLRA § 8(a)(3) but did not include the Court's rulings and explanation of rights in the terms of the agreement to intentionally mislead the workers within the union.

At issue was whether a union breaches its duty of fair representation by negotiating a union security clause that uses statutory language without articulating the Court's interpretation of that language.

== Opinion of the Court ==
The Court unanimously denied Marquez's claim.

The Court said that the statutory language incorporates all the refinements associated with the language, is a shorthand description of the worker's legal rights. The Court explained that if the petitioner's logic was used, there would be no stopping point because all contracts would have to spell out every intricacy of every term in the contract. Contracts would thus become massive, and yet there would be no real benefit from the increase in mass. The Court decided that it was perfectly reasonable for the union to use terms of art in a contract.

NLRB v. General Motors Corp.: An employee can satisfy NLRA § 8(a)(3) "membership" condition merely by paying to the union an amount equal to its initiation fees and dues.

Communications Workers of America v. Beck: NLRA § 8(a)(3) does not permit unions to exact fees or dues over the objection of nonmembers for activities that are not germane to collective bargaining, grievance adjustment, or contract administration.
