= Right-to-work law =

U.S. laws prohibiting mandated union membership and dues

In the context of labor law in the United States, right-to-work laws prohibit union security agreements between employers and labor unions. Such agreements can be incorporated into union contracts to require employees who are not union members to contribute to the costs of union representation. Unlike the right to work definition as a human right in international law, U.S. right-to-work laws do not aim to provide a general guarantee of employment to people seeking work but rather guarantee an employee's right to refrain from being a member of a labor union.

The 1947 federal Taft–Hartley Act governing private sector employment prohibits the "closed shop" in which employees are required to be members of a union as a condition of employment, but allows the union shop or "agency shop" in which employees pay a fee for the cost of representation without joining the union. Individual U.S. states set their own policies for state and local government employees (i.e. public sector employees). Twenty-eight states have right-to-work policies (either by statutes or by constitutional provision). In 2018, the U.S. Supreme Court ruled that agency shop arrangements for public sector employees were unconstitutional in the case Janus v. AFSCME.

== History ==
=== Origins ===
The original use of the term right to work was coined by French socialist leader Louis Blanc before 1848. According to the American Enterprise Institute, the modern usage of the term right to work was coined by Dallas Morning News editorial writer William Ruggles in 1941.

According to PandoDaily, the modern term was coined by Vance Muse, a Republican Party operative who headed the Christian American Association, an early right-to-work advocacy group, to replace the term "American Plan" after it became associated with the anti-union violence of the first Red Scare. Muse used racial segregationist arguments in advocating for anti-union laws.

According to Slate, right-to-work laws are derived from legislation forbidding unions from forcing strikes on workers, as well as from legal principles such as freedom of contract, which sought to prevent passage of laws regulating workplace conditions.

=== Wagner Act (1935) ===
The National Labor Relations Act, generally known as the Wagner Act, was passed in 1935 as part of President Franklin D. Roosevelt's "Second New Deal". Among other things, the act provided that a company could lawfully agree to be any of the following:

- A closed shop, in which employees must be members of the union as a condition of employment. Under a closed shop, an employee who ceased being a member of the union for whatever reason, from failure to pay dues to expulsion from the union as an internal disciplinary punishment, was required to be fired even if the employee did not violate any of the employer's rules.
- A union shop, which allows for hiring non-union employees, provided that the employees then join the union within a certain period.
- An agency shop, in which employees must pay the equivalent of the cost of union representation, but need not formally join the union.
- An open shop, in which an employee cannot be compelled to join or pay the equivalent of dues to a union or be fired for joining the union.

The act tasked the National Labor Relations Board, which had existed since 1933, with overseeing the rules.

=== Taft–Hartley Act (1947) ===
In 1947, the U.S. Congress passed the Labor Management Relations Act of 1947, generally known as the Taft–Hartley Act, over President Harry S. Truman's veto. The act repealed some parts of the Wagner Act, including outlawing the closed shop. Section 14(b) of the Taft–Hartley Act also authorizes individual states (but not local governments, such as cities or counties) to outlaw the union shop and agency shop for employees working in their jurisdictions. Any state law that outlaws such arrangements is known as a right-to-work state.

=== Current status ===
The federal government operates under open shop rules nationwide, but many of its employees are represented by unions. Unions that represent professional athletes have written contracts that include particular representation provisions (such as in the National Football League), but their application is limited to "wherever and whenever legal," as the Supreme Court has clearly held that the application of a right-to-work law is determined by the employee's "predominant job situs". Players on professional sports teams in states with right-to-work laws are thus subject to those laws and cannot be required to pay any portion of union dues as a condition of continued employment.

== Support and opposition ==
=== Supporters ===
==== Freedom of association ====
Besides the Supreme Court, other proponents of right-to-work laws also point to the U.S. Constitution and the right to freedom of association. They argue that workers should both be free to join unions or to refrain, and thus, sometimes refer to states without right-to-work laws as forced unionism states. These proponents argue that by being forced into a collective bargain, what the majoritarian unions call a fair share of collective bargaining costs, is actually financial coercion and a violation of freedom of choice. An opponent to the union bargain is forced to financially support an organization for which they did not vote in order to receive monopoly representation for which they have no choice. Further objections were raised to the practice of unions using forced dues to support political activity.

The Seventh-day Adventist Church discourages the joining of unions, citing the writings of Ellen White, one of the church's founders, and what writer Diana Justice calls the "loss of free will" that occurs when a person joins a labor union.

==== Unfairness ====
Proponents such as the Mackinac Center for Public Policy contend that it is unfair that unions can require new and existing employees to either join the union or pay fees for collective bargaining expenses as a condition of employment under union security agreement contracts. Other proponents contend that unions may still be needed in new and growing sectors of the economy, for example the voluntary and third party sectors, to assure adequate benefits for new immigrant, part-time aides such as the direct support professional workforce.

==== Political contributions ====
Right-to-work proponents, including the Center for Union Facts, contend that political contributions made by unions are not representative of the union workers and are used without permission, further noting that from 2010 to 2018, union officials sent more than 1.6 billion in membership dues to liberal advocacy groups aligned with the Democratic Party. The agency shop portion of this had previously been contested with support of National Right to Work Legal Defense Foundation in Communications Workers of America v. Beck, resulting in "Beck rights" preventing agency fees from being used for expenses outside of collective bargaining if the non-union worker notifies the union of their objection. The right to challenge the fees must include the right to have it heard by an impartial fact finder. Beck applies only to unions in the private sector, given agency fees were struck down for public-sector unions in Janus v. AFSCME in 2018.

=== Opposition ===
==== Free riders ====
Opponents, such as Richard Kahlenberg, have argued that a right-to-work law "gives employees the right to be free riders—to benefit from collective bargaining without paying for it." Benefits that the dissenting employees receive, despite not paying dues, also include representation during arbitration proceedings. In Abood v. Detroit BoE, the Supreme Court of the United States permitted public-sector unions to charge non-members agency fees so that employees in the public sector could be required to pay for the costs of representation, even as they opted not to be a member, as long as these fees are not spent on the union's political or ideological agenda. This decision was reversed, however, in Janus v. AFSCME, with the Supreme Court ruling that such fees violate the First Amendment in the case of public-sector unions, arguing that all bargaining by a public-sector union can be considered political activity.

==== Restricted freedom of contract and association ====
Opponents argue that right-to-work laws restrict freedom of association, and limit the sorts of agreements that individuals acting collectively can make with their employer by prohibiting workers and employers from agreeing to contracts that include fair share fees. They also argue that American law imposes a duty of fair representation on unions, so non-members in right-to-work states can force unions to provide grievance services without compensation that are paid by union members. Kahlenberg and Marvit also argue that, at least in efforts to pass a right-to-work law in Michigan, excluding police and firefighter unions—traditionally less hostile to Republicans—from the law caused some to question claims that the law was simply an effort to improve Michigan's business climate, not to seek partisan advantage.

In December 2012, libertarian writer J. D. Tuccille wrote in Reason: "I consider the restrictions right-to-work laws impose on bargaining between unions and businesses to violate freedom of contract and association. ... I'm disappointed that the state has, once again, inserted itself into the marketplace to place its thumb on the scale in the never-ending game of playing business and labor off against one another. ... This is not to say that unions are always good. It means that, when the state isn't involved, they're private organizations that can offer value to their members."

== Studies of economic effect ==
Many studies of the effect of right-to-work laws exist but they find substantially different results. Studies have found both "some positive effect on job growth" and no effect. A 2019 paper in the American Economic Review by economists from MIT, Stanford, and the U.S. Census Bureau, which surveyed 35,000 U.S. manufacturing plants, found that "the business environment, as measured by right-to-work laws, boosts incentive management practices." A 2026 study in the American Sociological Review found that right-to-work laws had no observable impact on economic dynamism. According to a 2020 study published in the American Journal of Sociology, right-to-work laws lead to greater economic inequality by indirectly reducing the power of labor unions. Looking at the growth of states in the Southeast following World War II, economist Tim Bartik says that while these states have right-to-work laws, they have also benefited from "factors like the widespread use of air conditioning and different modes of transportation that helped decentralize manufacturing."

Economist Thomas Holmes argues that it is difficult to analyze right-to-work laws by comparing states because of other similarities between states that have passed these laws. For instance, right-to-work states often have some strong pro-business policies, making it difficult to isolate the effect of right-to-work laws. Holmes compared counties close to the border between states with and without right-to-work laws, thereby holding constant an array of factors related to geography and climate. He found that the cumulative growth of employment in manufacturing in the right-to-work states was 26% greater than that in the non-right-to-work states. Given the study design, Holmes writes that "my results do not say that it is right-to-work laws that matter, but rather that the 'pro-business package' offered by right-to-work states seems to matter." Moreover, as noted by Kevin Drum and others, this result may reflect business relocation rather than an overall enhancement of economic growth since, as Drum writes, "businesses prefer locating in states where costs are low and rules are lax".

== Polling ==
In January 2012, in the immediate aftermath of passage of Indiana's right-to-work law, a Rasmussen Reports telephone survey found that 74% of likely voters disagreed with the question "Should workers who do not belong to a union be required by law to pay union dues if the company they work for is unionized?" but found that "most also don't think a non-union worker should enjoy benefits negotiated by the union."

In January through March 2013, 43% of those polled believed that the law would help Michigan's economy, while 41% believed that it would hurt.

== Political support ==
In 2012, President Barack Obama opposed right-to-work legislation in Michigan. In 2017, Republican members of Congress introduced legislation for a national right-to-work law.

== U.S. states with right-to-work laws ==
Right-to-work law No right-to-work law

As of May 2024, the following 26 states have right-to-work laws:

- Alabama (adopted 1953, Constitution 2016)
- Arizona (Constitution, adopted 1946)
- Arkansas (Constitution, adopted 1947)
- Florida (Constitution, adopted 1944, revised 1968)
- Georgia (adopted 1947)
- Idaho (adopted 1985)
- Indiana (adopted 2012)
- Iowa (adopted 1947)
- Kansas (Constitution, adopted 1958)
- Kentucky (adopted 2017)
- Louisiana (adopted 1976)
- Mississippi (Constitution, adopted 1954)
- Nebraska (Constitution and statute, adopted 1946)
- Nevada (adopted 1951)
- North Carolina (adopted 1947)
- North Dakota (adopted 1947)
- Oklahoma (Constitution, adopted 2001)
- South Carolina (adopted 1954)
- South Dakota (adopted 1946)
- Tennessee (adopted 1947, Constitution 2022)
- Texas (adopted 1947, revised 1993)
- Utah (adopted 1955)
- Virginia (adopted 1947)
- West Virginia (adopted 2016)
- Wisconsin (adopted 2015)
- Wyoming (adopted 1963)

The territory of Guam also has right-to-work laws.

Ohio allows employees to opt out from joining a union, but unions are allowed to charge a typically smaller fee for employees that opted out. In a 1958 referendum, voters in Ohio rejected right-to-work by 2,001,512 to 1,106,324 votes. Voters again rejected right-to-work by a similar margin in a 2011 veto referendum.

=== Local or repealed laws ===
Some states had right-to-work laws in the past, but repealed them or had them declared invalid. There are also some counties and municipalities located in states without right-to-work laws that have passed local laws to ban union security agreements.

==== Delaware ====
Seaford passed a right-to-work ordinance in 2018, despite the State Solicitor disputing the authority of local governments to do so under Delaware law. Later that year, the Delaware General Assembly blocked the municipal ordinance.

==== Illinois ====
Lincolnshire passed a local right-to-work ordinance, but it was struck down by the U.S. Seventh Circuit Court of Appeals. An appeal to the U.S. Supreme Court resulted in the case being vacated as being moot because in the intervening period Illinois had passed the Illinois Collective Bargaining Freedom Act to invalidate such local ordinances.

In a 2022 referendum, voters in Illinois approved a state constitutional amendment establishing a right to collective bargaining. The amendment also prevents any future state legislature or local government from passing a right-to-work law.

==== Indiana ====
Before its passage in 2012, the Republican-controlled Indiana General Assembly passed a right-to-work bill in 1957, which led to the Democratic takeover of Indiana's Governor's Mansion and General Assembly in the coming elections, and eventually, the new Democratic-controlled legislature repealing the right-to-work law in 1965. Right-to-work was subsequently reenacted in 2012.

==== Kentucky ====
On November 18, 2016, the U.S. Sixth Circuit Court of Appeals upheld the right of local governments to enact local right-to-work laws in Kentucky. Kentucky had 12 local ordinances. A statewide law was subsequently enacted in 2017.

==== Michigan ====
Michigan adopted a right-to-work bill in 2012. After Democrats gained a trifecta in 2023, the legislature passed a bill repealing the right-to-work law, which was subsequently signed into law by Governor Gretchen Whitmer and took effect in 2024.

==== Missouri ====
The legislature passed a right-to-work bill in 2017, but the law was defeated in a 2018 referendum before it could take effect.

==== New Hampshire ====
New Hampshire adopted a right-to-work bill in 1947, but it was repealed in 1949 by the state legislature and governor.

In 2017, a proposed right to work bill was defeated in the New Hampshire House of Representatives 200–177. In 2021, the same bill was reintroduced but again defeated in the House of Representatives 199–175.

==== New Mexico ====
New Mexico law previously did not explicitly prohibit nor allow mandatory union membership as a condition of employment at the statewide level, thereby leaving it up to local jurisdictions to establish their own right-to-work policies. Several counties, notably Chaves, Eddy, Lea, Lincoln, McKinley, Otero, Roosevelt, Sandoval, San Juan, and Sierra counties, in addition to Ruidoso village adopted such laws. In 2019, the New Mexico Legislature approved legislation that prohibits local right-to-work laws and further states that union membership and the payment of union dues may be required as a condition of employment in workplaces subject to a collective bargaining agreement; it was signed by governor Michelle Lujan Grisham. In 2020, New Mexico's legislature passed House Bill 364 that authorizes and promotes the use of card check protocols for workers considering organizing into a labor union. New Mexico does not currently require Project Labor Agreements for state-sponsored projects, but some local jurisdictions (notably Bernalillo County and the City of Albuquerque) have ordinances in place requiring Project Labor Agreements for locally-sponsored projects that exceed specified dollar-value thresholds.

== See also ==
- At-will employment
- Labor unions in the United States
- Union affiliation by U.S. state
- United States labor law
