= Lehnert v. Ferris Faculty Ass'n =

United States Supreme Court case

Lehnert v. Ferris Faculty Association
- Supreme Court of the United States

Argued November 5, 1990 Decided May 30, 1991
- Full case name: James P. Lehnert, et al., Petitioners v. Ferris Faculty Association, et al.
- Citations: 500 U.S. 507 (more) 111 S. Ct. 1950; 114 L. Ed. 2d 572; 1991 U.S. LEXIS 3017; 59 U.S.L.W. 4544; 137 L.R.R.M. 2321; 91 Cal. Daily Op. Service 3972; 91 Daily Journal DAR 6313

Case history
- Prior: 556 F. Supp. 309 (W.D. Mich. 1982); 643 F. Supp. 1306 (W.D. Mich. 1986); 881 F.2d 1388 (6th Cir. 1989); 893 F.2d 111 (6th Cir. 1989)

Holding
- Unions may compel contributions from nonmembers only for the costs of performing its duties as exclusive bargaining agent.

Court membership
- Chief Justice William Rehnquist Associate Justices Byron White · Thurgood Marshall; Harry Blackmun · John P. Stevens; Sandra Day O'Connor · Antonin Scalia; Anthony Kennedy · David Souter

Case opinions
- Majority: Blackmun (parts I, II, III-B, III-C, IV-B (except final paragraph), IV-D, IV-E, IV-F), joined by Rehnquist, White, Marshall, Stevens
- Plurality: Blackmun (parts III-A, IV-A, IV-B (final paragraph), IV-C, V), joined by Rehnquist, White, Stevens
- Concur/dissent: Marshall
- Concur/dissent: Scalia, joined by O'Connor, Souter; Kennedy (all but part III-C)
- Concur/dissent: Kennedy

Laws applied
- U.S. Const. amend. I

Lehnert v. Ferris Faculty Association, 500 U.S. 507 (1991), deals with First Amendment rights and unions in public employment.

== Background ==
Due to collective bargaining laws in some states (in this case, Michigan), employees in the public sector (in this case Ferris State University) are often required to either join a union or pay a "service fee" to a union (in this case, the Ferris Faculty Association, Michigan Education Association, and National Education Association) for the collective bargaining services. This case pertains to the usage and collection of union dues in the form of "service fees" from dissenting nonmember employees. The Plaintiffs argued that their required "services fees" are not going toward collective bargaining, but rather toward other union activities with which they disagree (such as political lobbying), and thus the compulsory fees are a violation of their freedom of speech rights. The defendant union argued that their non-bargaining activities are "designed to influence the public employer's position at the bargaining table," and therefore that they benefit the collective bargaining process.

== Opinion of the Court ==
In a majority opinion by Justice Blackmun, the Court found that unions may compel contributions from nonmembers only for the costs of performing its duties as exclusive bargaining agent. The Court found largely for the Plaintiff, but also continued to uphold the compulsory "service fee" itself and affirmed some of the questioned uses of the "service fee." In general, freedom of speech rights are found to limit what "service fees" may be used for. The Court ruled that the majority of the "service fees" collected in this case were used unconstitutionally. Also, the court now requires unions to provide an audited accounting report of their "service fee" spending to fee-paying nonmembers.

This case provides broad clarification on the subject of required union fees in the public sector. It strikes down a previously used three-part test in favor of a more practical one-part test. This new test dictates that: "a union may constitutionally compel contributions from dissenting nonmembers in an agency shop only for the costs of performing the union's statutory duties as exclusive bargaining agent." However, much leeway and uncertainty still exists regarding the acceptable use of union "service fees" in the public sector.

=== Allowed uses of union "service fees" ===
The court found that "a union may constitutionally compel contributions from dissenting nonmembers in an agency shop only for the costs of performing the union's statutory duties as exclusive bargaining agent." These costs include:

- Expenses directly related to the collective bargaining process.
- "Program expenditures" of the national union, even those destined for other states.
- Certain sections of the state union’s newsletter. These sections must deal directly with collective bargaining, professional development, education, unemployment, and other non-political topics which "benefit all."
- Participation by the local delegates in the state and national conventions which are likely to have some benefit to collective bargaining.
- All expenses associated with preparation for, and negotiation of strikes.

=== Illegal uses of union "service fees" ===
The court also found that "certain other of the union activities at issue may not constitutionally be supported through objecting employees' funds." These disallowed costs include:

- Lobbying, electoral, or other union political activities outside the scope of contract negotiations, which "would compel dissenters to engage in core political speech with which they disagree."
- Union activities which serve to secure state, local, or national funds for education and sections of the newsletter which report on these issues.
- Litigation which does not directly relate to the collective bargaining process and union literature which reports on this.
- Public relations efforts which seek to enhance the reputation of the teaching profession and expenses related to information picketing, media exposure, signs, posters, and buttons.

=== Rationale ===
The following cases were cited in the majority opinion:

- Machinists v. Street (1961), states that "a union may constitutionally compel contributions from dissenting nonmembers in an agency shop only for the costs of performing the union's statutory duties as exclusive bargaining agent."
- Abood v. Detroit Board of Education (1977), upholds the constitutionality of compulsory "service fees" for collective bargaining services.
- Ellis v. Railway Clerks (1984), allows local unions to support their national affiliates through nonmembers "service fees" since they often provide support to the bargaining table in a variety of ways both direct and indirect. However, this case does not allow free spending by the unions but limits it somewhat.

== See also ==
- US labor law
- List of United States Supreme Court cases involving the First Amendment
- List of United States Supreme Court cases, volume 500
- List of United States Supreme Court cases
- Lists of United States Supreme Court cases by volume
- List of United States Supreme Court cases by the Rehnquist Court
- Locke v. Karass, 555 U.S. 207 (2008)
