= Jenifer Loon =

American politician

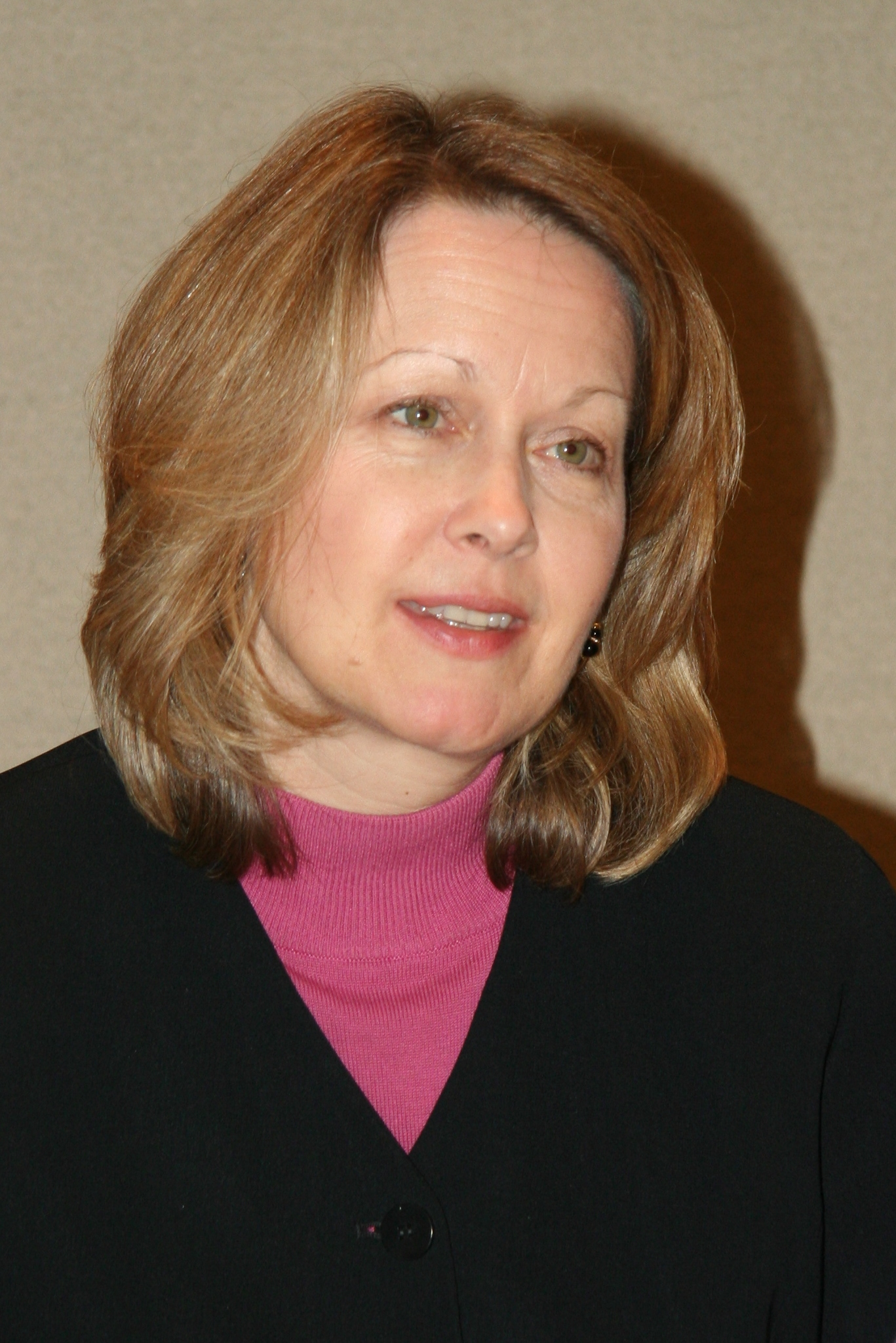

Member of the Minnesota House of Representatives
- In office January 7, 2013 – January 8, 2019
- Succeeded by: Carlie Kotyza-Witthuhn
- Constituency: District 48B
- In office January 5, 2009 – January 7, 2013
- Preceded by: Erik Paulsen
- Constituency: District 42B

Personal details
- Born: September 17, 1963 (age 63) South Dakota
- Party: Republican Party of Minnesota
- Spouse: Doug
- Children: 2
- Education: Augustana College
- Occupation: legislative policy consultant

Jenifer W. Loon (born September 17, 1963) is an American politician who was a member of the Minnesota House of Representatives from 2009 to 2019. A member of the Republican Party of Minnesota, she represented District 48B, which was primarily in Eden Prairie, located in southwestern Hennepin County in the Twin Cities metropolitan area. Loon is also a legislative policy consultant.

== Early life, education, and career ==
Loon grew up on a dairy farm in rural South Dakota. While in high school, she was a page in the South Dakota House of Representatives, where her uncle was a member. Loon graduated from Augustana College in Sioux Falls in 1985, earning her BA in Government and International Affairs.

After graduating from college, Loon became active in government at the national level. She was a legislative assistant to U.S. Senator Larry Pressler from 1986 to 1988, and a lobbyist and legislative representative for Associated Builders and Contractors, a national trade association representing Merit Shop construction companies, from 1988 to 1990. She worked in several staff positions for the U.S. House of Representatives from 1990 to 1997, including legislative director, minority policy director, minority staff director, and staff director for the House Committee on Small Business (1995–1997), where she worked directly with the committee chair, Congresswoman Jan Meyers of Kansas. From 2003 to 2007, she was director of government affairs, lead federal lobbyist and legislative strategist for ACA International, a national trade association representing the credit and collection industry.

== Minnesota House of Representatives ==
Loon was first elected in 2008, running after seven-term Representative Erik Paulsen opted not to seek reelection in order to run for the U.S. House of Representatives.

Loon was one of only four Republican representatives to vote in favor of the same-sex marriage bill passed by the House on May 9, 2013.

In 2018, Loon was defeated for reelection by DFL challenger Carlie Kotyza-Witthuhn.
