= 2025 repeal of Missouri Proposition A (2024) =

In 2025, the Missouri General Assembly and Governor Mike Kehoe overturned 2024 Missouri Proposition A (Prop A) via House Bill 567 (HB 567). Prop A passed via a ballot amendment on November 5, 2024 during the 2024 general election by a margin of just over 15% with nearly 1.7 million votes in favor. It contained a few key provisions: increase the minimum wage to $13.75 per hour in 2025, increase the minimum wage to $15 per hour in 2026, continue to adjust the minimum wage for inflation beginning in 2027, and require employers to provide paid sick leave. HB 567 kept the $13.75 and $15 minimum wage increases in 2025 and 2026 respectively, but overturned the latter two provisions. While challenges to Prop A initially proceeded through legal channels, the voter-approved initiative was eventually overturned by the state legislature and governor, a substantial policy change affecting Missourians.

== Background ==
Prop A was a follow-up to 2018 Missouri Proposition B which raised the minimum wage to $12 in 2023 and passed with the support of over 62% of Missouri voters. Prop A was a voter-led measure that included the following provisions:

- Minimum Wage Adjustments
  - Increase the minimum wage from $12 to $13.75 per hour on January 1, 2025
  - Increase the minimum wage from $13.75 to $15 per hour on January 1, 2026
  - Continue to adjust the minimum wage yearly based on changes to the consumer price index starting on January 1, 2027
- Mandatory Paid Sick Leave
  - Mandate employers provide one hour of paid sick leave per every 30 hours worked starting by May 1, 2025, with exceptions for some employers, such as political subdivisions and governmental entities
- Enforcement
  - Give authority to the Missouri Department of Labor and Industrial Relations to provide enforcement and oversight

On November 5, 2024, Prop A passed with 57.6% voting in favor and 42.4% voting in opposition; a margin of 15.2 points. Despite being opposed by a majority of the GOP, it passed overwhelmingly even while Donald Trump defeated Kamala Harris on the top of the ticket by a margin of 18.4 points. Additionally, it outperformed 2024 Missouri Amendment 3 which sought to establish abortion rights through viability. Amendment 3, which was also opposed by a majority of the GOP, passed by 3.2 points statewide. The passage of Prop A is consistent with a broader pattern in which Missouri voters have supported ballot measures associated with progressive or populist policy positions, even as the state has continued to favor Republican candidates in local, statewide and federal elections. In addition to voting against the GOP majority position on Prop A and the aforementioned Amendment 3 (abortion rights), Missouri voters also legalized recreational marijuana in 2022 (2022 Missouri Amendment 3), expanded Medicaid in 2020 (2020 Missouri Amendment 2), and voted to curb corruption and increase government-accountability in 2018 (2018 Missouri Amendment 1).

Prop A took effect on January 1, 2025, when the first minimum wage increase ($12 to $13.75) went into effect, followed by mandatory sick paid leave, which was required to be implemented by employers no later than May 1, 2025.

== Legal and legislative responses ==
Following the passing of Prop A, opponents began exploring options to limit the scope of the proposition. These mainly followed legal and legislative channels.

=== Legal response ===
A lawsuit seeking to challenge Prop A was filed by multiple business organizations, including the National Federation of Independent Businesses, the Missouri Chamber of Commerce and Industry, and the Missouri Restaurant Association, one month after the proposition passed.

Opponents argued that the economic impact summary at the end of the ballot misled voters and that the combination of the minimum wage increase and paid sick leave on one ballot violated the single-subject rule of the Constitution of Missouri. These arguments were among those cited as evidence of “election irregularities” requiring judicial intervention.

The case, Raymond McCarty, et al. v. Missouri Secretary of State, et al., was heard by the Supreme Court of Missouri. The court ultimately decided to uphold Prop A with the support of six of the seven justices. Writing for the majority, Chief Justice Mary R. Russell, argued against each argument against the validity of Prop A.

The majority argued that the case was not about the merits of the proposition’s provision, but rather about whether the fiscal note summary and the ballot summary statement were “so materially inaccurate and seriously misleading that they cast doubt on the fairness of the election and the validity of its results.” The court concluded that the summary statement was fair and accurate, arguing that it does not need to explain every detail of the proposition as long as it communicates the key provisions. They also argued that the minimum wage language and sick leave provisions were summarized appropriately and not misleading. Further, they argued the fiscal note summary was adequate and that the plaintiffs failed to meet the higher post-election burden. Finally, they argued the single-subject concerns fell outside their jurisdiction. The lone dissenting justice, Robin Ransom, agreed with the majority on the merits of the case, but asserted that the court did not have jurisdiction over the post-election ballot-title challenges.

=== Legislative response ===
Opponents to the law also explored legislative options.

State representatives moved quickly, considering multiple bills to alter or repeal provisions approved as a part of Prop A. One of the early bills sought to repeal the inflation adjustment while lowering the minimum wage for younger workers, under age 20, to $7.25 per hour. Another bill sought to exempt workers under the age of 21 from the state minimum wage as well as businesses with fewer than 50 total employees. Meanwhile, business groups, such as the Missouri Chamber of Commerce and Industry, continued to push lawmakers to delay the implementation of paid sick leave to give more time for alterations or a possible repeal of the proposition. Republican state legislators argued that their intent was not to override the will of the voters, but rather consider the potential negative impact on businesses, particularly small businesses. However, Democratic state legislatures argued that Missouri voters had increased the state’s minimum wage more than once in the past, with little to no negative economic impacts.

Following consideration of multiple bills targeting Prop A, Republican State Representative Sherri Gallick of Belton and Republican State Senator Mike Bernskoetter of Jefferson City sponsored HB 567. This bill sought to repeal the minimum wage inflation adjustment provision as well as the sick leave mandate. However, it expanded the 2025 and 2026 minimum wage increases to include public employees, who had previously been excluded in Prop A. Much of the argument against the law was the financial and regulatory burden critics suggested it placed on employers as well as other economic concerns. Moves to repeal Prop A were opposed by Missouri Democrats and labor rights groups. Democratic legislators argued that the bill passed statewide overwhelmingly, and that repealing its key provisions would not only deny the will of the voters, but would also lead to increased distrust of the state legislature. Labor groups, such as Missouri Jobs with Justice, also strongly opposed the bill, arguing that it would harm Missouri workers and their families.

In the end, HB 567 passed in the Missouri State House of Representatives by a final vote of 96-51 in March of 2025. Later, in May of 2025, it passed in the Missouri State Senate by a final vote of 22-11 (with only one Republican voting alongside all 10 Democrats in opposition). In July of 2025, Missouri Governor Mike Kehoe signed house HB 567 into law, formally overturning mandatory paid sick leave and further increases to the minimum wage. At the time of passing, Republicans argued the overturned provisions would have prevented businesses from running efficiently and would not have been sustainable. Democrats, however, stood in strong opposition to Republicans ignoring the decisive verdict delivered by Missouri voters, over 57% of whom had supported these provisions less than a year prior.
