= Independent Electrical Contractors =

American trade organization

Independent Electrical Contractors (IEC) is a non-profit trade organization for merit shop electrical and systems contractors. It is based in Arlington, Virginia. IEC is a member of the U.S. Occupational Safety and Health Administration (OSHA) Alliance program.

== Education and training ==
IEC provides workforce training for apprentices, journeymen, and foremen, which is recognized by the U.S. Department of Labor’s Bureau of Apprenticeship and Training. Training takes place in more than 50 IEC chapter training centers nationwide, is conducted in accordance with the requirements established by the U.S. Department of Labor, and is recognized by the U.S. Department of Veterans Affairs. Graduates of IEC's apprenticeship program are recommended by the American Council of Education to receive up to 41 college credits. IEC chapters offer continuing education courses for professional contractors, including the Certified Professional Electrician Credential.

== IEC Foundation ==
Founded in 1996, the Independent Electrical Contractors Foundation (IECF) has provided over $5 million in cash and equipment to the IEC training center nationally.
