= Duty of fair representation =

Principle in American labor law

The duty of fair representation is incumbent upon Canadian and U.S. labor unions that are the exclusive bargaining representative of workers in a particular group. It is the obligation to represent all employees fairly, in good faith, and without discrimination.

Originally recognized by the United States Supreme Court in a series of cases in the mid-1940s involving racial discrimination by railway workers' unions covered by the Railway Labor Act, the duty of fair representation also applies to workers covered by the National Labor Relations Act and, depending on the terms of the statute, to public sector workers covered by state and local laws regulating labor relations.

The term as used in Canada applied to 7 out of 10 provinces and in federal law as of 2003.

== History ==
The concept of a DFR originated in the 1940s in the American case, Steele v. Louisville & Nashville Railroad and was formalized as a legal test in Vaca v. Sipes (1967). The doctrine was first mentioned in Canada with the Woods Task Force Report. The first Canadian case to establish a DFR was Fisher v. Pemberton (1969) which cited Vaca v. Sipes. A DFR wasn't enacted in statute in Canada until amendments to the Labour Relations Act of Ontario were added in 1971, followed by British Columbia in 1973.

== Application in Canada ==
Findings of a violation of the DFR against a union are relatively rare in Canada, as the courts have interpreted it not as duty to provide good representation but as a duty to not provide bad or discriminatory representation. Nevertheless, DFR complaints are upheld in cases where the union has made decisions that are "arbitrary, capricious, discriminatory or wrongful".

== Application in the United States ==
The duty applies to virtually every action that a union might take in dealing with an employer as the representative of employees, from its negotiation of the terms of a collective bargaining agreement, to its handling of grievances arising under that agreement, as well as its operation of an exclusive hiring hall and its enforcement of the union security provisions of a collective bargaining agreement. However, the duty does not ordinarily apply to rights that a worker can enforce independently; the union has no duty to assist the employees it represents in filing claims under a workers' compensation statute or other laws.

The duty likewise does not apply for the most part to unions' internal affairs, such as their right to discipline employees for violation of the union's own rules or union officers' handling of union funds, which are regulated instead by the Labor Management Reporting and Disclosure Act. The courts have, on the other hand, applied the same principles that govern the duty of fair representation to union members' suits to enforce union constitutions.

=== Courts' view ===
Generally the courts have taken a deferential approach to reviewing unions' decisions challenged as a breach of their duty of fair representation. Recognizing that the collective bargaining process typically requires compromises, which may favor some workers at the expense of others, the courts have held that a union only breaches its duty if it acts arbitrarily, in bad faith or discriminatorily. Practical considerations have also led the courts to refuse to second-guess unions' decisions: if a court or jury could substitute its judgment as to whether a particular grievance had merit, then unions could not function, since their decisions would rarely be final in any practical sense. Accordingly, the courts have refused to overturn union decisions as arbitrary so long as they were based on a reasoned decision by the union, even if the court might believe that this decision was wrong.

=== New applications ===
In recent years the courts and the National Labor Relations Board have applied the duty of fair representation to regulate the manner in which unions enforce the union security provisions of a collective bargaining agreement. Unlike the standard applied to unions' decisions concerning grievance handling and collective bargaining negotiations, the courts and the Board have regulated this area very extensively. They have specified the types of expenses that a union can include in the fees that it charges employees who choose not to join the union but are required to pay dues under an agency shop or union shop clause, the accounting procedures used to calculate those amounts, the procedures which the union and employees must follow if an individual worker objects to paying the full amount of dues or challenges the union's calculation of the lesser amount that non-members can be required to pay, and the procedures that the union must follow before it can force the employer to fire an employee for non-payment of dues. Even stricter standards are applied to unions covered by the Railway Labor Act and to unions of governmental employees on constitutional grounds.

The NLRB applies a similarly strict standard in reviewing unions' enforcement of exclusive hiring halls, i.e., those in which the employer is bound, by contract, to hire only employees referred to it by the union. The NLRB requires unions to establish clear procedures and to follow those procedures in order to minimize the likelihood that the union would use a hiring hall procedure to exclude non-members or those out of favour with the union from the workplace. On the other hand, the NLRB applies the more deferential standard applied to union decisions generally in the case of non-exclusive hiring halls, i.e., those in which the union has the power to refer applicants for employment but the employer may also hire employees "off the street"; in those cases the union is barred from acting arbitrarily, in bad faith or discriminatorily.

=== Violations ===
The NLRB recognizes a breach of the duty of fair representation as a violation of the National Labor Relations Act. However, because the duty of fair representation was originally created by judicial interpretation, rather than as an express statutory prohibition, employees covered by the National Labor Relations Act may sue their unions directly, without being required to first exhaust any administrative procedures provided under the National Labor Relations Board. The same is true for workers covered by the Railway Labor Act, which does not provide any administrative procedure for pursuing claims against a union. Employees' claims under either Act are governed by a six-month statute of limitations.

The NLRB and the courts provide different solutions against unions that breached their duty of fair representation. Because the Board does not usually have the jurisdiction to enforce the collective bargaining agreement or to issue a remedial order against an employer that has violated it, the NLRB often cannot award complete relief to employees. A court, on the other hand, may order an employer to reinstate or pay back pay to an employee if it finds that the employer violated the collective bargaining agreement and may, in some instances, order the union to pay attorneys' fees to a successful plaintiff. These distinctions do not apply to workers covered by the Railway Labor Act since, as noted above, they have no administrative procedures to enforce their rights.

A union may, in some limited circumstances, require employees to exhaust any internal appeals procedures provided under the union's constitution before filing suit. Unions and employers may also generally require employees to exhaust their rights under the grievance arbitration procedures provided for under the collective bargaining agreement before suing the employer for breach of contract. However employees do not usually have to exhaust such procedures if they are suing only the union, since very few collective bargaining agreements even allow for the filing of a grievance against the union by covered employees. To the extent that an employee might have a breach of contract claim against a union arising out of its performance of its duty to represent that employee, the courts will apply the same deferential standards and procedural requirements that they would employ if the worker sued the union on a breach of the duty of fair representation theory.

== See also ==
- Unfair labor practice
