= 2011 Ohio Issue 2 =

Issue 2
- Issue 2 - Proposed Referendum on Amended Sub. S.B. 5.

Results
Choice	Votes	%
Yes	1,373,724	38.41%
No	2,202,404	61.59%
Total votes	3,576,128	100.00%
Registered voters/turnout	7,709,478	46.39%
Yes
50–60%
No
80–90%
70–80%
60–70%
50–60%

The Ohio Collective Bargaining Limit Repeal appeared on the November 8, 2011 general election ballot in the state of Ohio as a veto referendum. Senate Bill 5 (SB5) was repealed by Ohio voters after a campaign by firefighters, police officers and teachers against the measure, which would have limited collective bargaining for public employees in the state. The formal title of the proposal that this measure nullified is Senate Bill 5. Among other provisions, SB 5 would have prevented unions from charging fair share dues to employees who opt out. The process to place the referendum on the ballot for voters to decide was completed by supporters, as signatures were certified by the Ohio Secretary of State. The group behind the referendum effort was the political action committee We Are Ohio.

Senate Bill 5 would have impacted the state's 400,000 public workers, restricting their ability to strike and collectively bargain. The bill would have limited public employees to collectively bargain for wages, preventing them from collectively bargaining for health insurance and pensions. It would also have prohibited all public employees from striking and could have increased employee contributions for pensions and healthcare.

According to reports, the measure's language was decided on August 3, 2011. A "yes" vote was a vote to keep the law, while a "no" vote was a vote to repeal the law. Interests raised more than $30 million for the campaign.

== Path to the ballot ==
=== Enactment of SB 5 ===
The Ohio State Senate passed Senate Bill 5 with a vote of 17–16, sending the measure to the Ohio House of Representatives for a similar vote. According to reports, on March 28, 2011, the chamber was preparing to vote on the proposal. State Representative Bob Hagan stated that the measure was most likely going to be voted on by March 30, 2011 On that day, Senate Bill 5 passed the House by a margin of 53–44. The house-modified bill was referred back to the senate where it was approved before being sent to the Governor's desk. It was then signed into law on March 31, 2011

=== Referendum process ===
Supporters collected about 3,000 signatures during the weekend of April 1, 2011, more than enough to turn in to the Ohio Secretary of State's office for the first step of the referendum process. A minimum of 1,000 valid signatures are required to launch a referendum. The first batch was turned in on April 4, 2011, according to reports. The Secretary of State verified the submitted signatures on April 15, 2011. The verification launched the second part of the referendum process.

According to state law, referendum supporters have until June 30, 2011, 90 days after the targeted law is signed by the state governor, to collect additional signatures. A total of 231,149 signatures must be collected from registered voters; equal to 6 percent of the total number of voters in the 2010 gubernatorial election. Additionally, those signatures must come from at least half of the 88 counties in the state.

The Ohio Secretary of State had until July 26, 2011, to verify signatures once they were turned in.

The proposal then went to the Ohio Ballot Board. The board then had total control over how the measure will be presented to voters.

=== Signature gathering ===
On June 17, 2011, less than two weeks before the petition drive deadline, supporters announced the collection of 714,137 signatures. Previously, on May 20, 2011, supporters claimed that they had collected approximately 214,000 signatures. We Are Ohio spokeswoman Melissa Fazekas stated that a sampling of those signatures showed a validation rate of about 60 percent. According to reports, the group must collect 400,000 signatures at that rate in order for the measure to make the ballot. According to Fazekas at the time: "Our goal is to collect between 450,000 and 500,000 [signatures]."

=== Signature submission ===
In a record breaking performance, referendum proponents submitted 1,298,301 signatures to the Ohio Secretary of State on June 29, 2011, in a parade marching towards the secretary's offices. This breaks the previously held record of 812,978 signatures in 2008 for a constitutional amendment allowing a casino resort in Clinton County.

=== Signature verification ===
According to Matt McClellan, spokesperson for the Ohio Secretary of State: "The next step the signatures have to be verified. The secretary's office receives the petitions and we will take an inventory of them. Then we send them out to the proper county boards of election. They have the signatures on file."

44 of the state's counties must have three percent of the signatures of those who voted in the 2010 gubernatorial election.

According to reports as of July 17, 2011, the proponents appeared to have enough signatures for the ballot. Although not all numbers had been verified, some counties recorded a high amount of verification rates.

The proposal was then certified on July 21, 2011, by the Ohio Secretary of State.

Of the more than 1.3 million signatures submitted by supporters, the secretary of state's office certified 915,456 for an approximately 70.5% validation rate. The Ballot Board, which is given the responsibility of crafting ballot language, met on August 3, 2011.
