= Carlie Kotyza-Witthuhn =

American politician

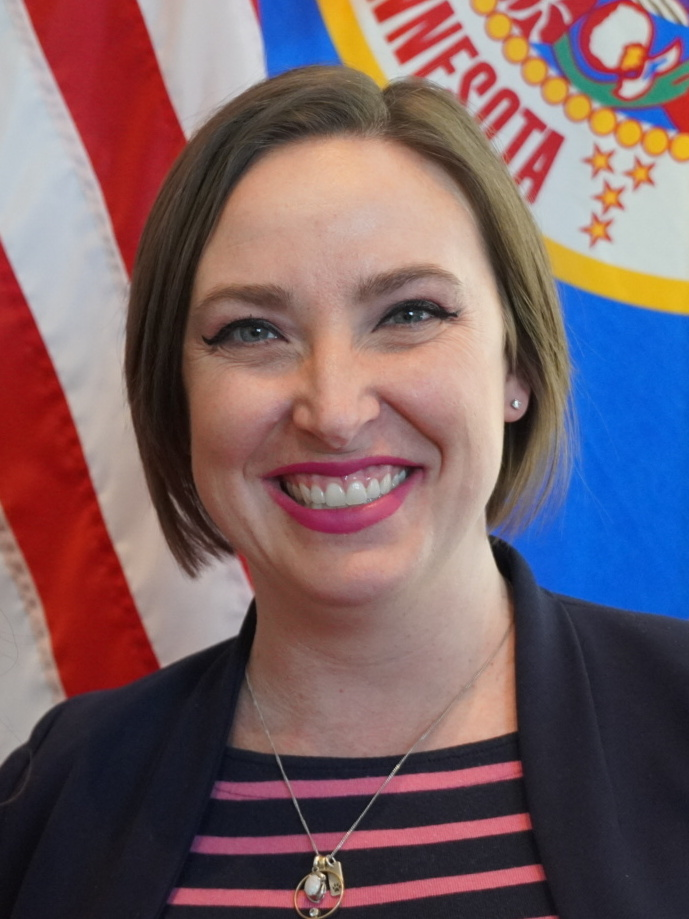

Member of the Minnesota House of Representatives from district 49B (2023-present) 48B (2019-2022) (Eden Prairie)
- Incumbent
- Assumed office January 8, 2019
- Preceded by: Jenifer Loon

Personal details
- Born: 1986 or 1987 (age 38–39)
- Party: Democratic (DFL)
- Spouse: Rory
- Children: 4
- Education: University of St. Thomas (B.A.)
- Occupation: Operations analyst; Legislator
- Website: Government website Campaign website

Carlie Kotyza-Witthuhn (/kəˈtiːzə wɪˈtun/, kə-TEEZ-ə wit-TOON, born 1986/1987) is an American politician serving since 2019 in the Minnesota House of Representatives. A member of the Minnesota Democratic–Farmer–Labor Party (DFL), Kotyza-Witthuhn represents District 49B in the southwestern Twin Cities metropolitan area, which includes the city of Eden Prairie and other parts of Hennepin County, Minnesota.

== Early life, education, and career ==
Kotyza-Witthuhn grew up in Sheboygan, Wisconsin, and attended the University of St. Thomas, graduating with a Bachelor of Arts in entrepreneurship. She is an operations analyst.

== Minnesota House of Representatives ==
Kotyza-Witthuhn was elected to the Minnesota House of Representatives in 2018 and has been reelected every two years since. She defeated five-term Republican incumbent Jenifer Loon.

Kotyza-Witthuhn has served as vice chair of the Commerce Finance and Policy Committee since 2021. She also sits on the Children and Families Finance and Policy, Economic Development Finance and Policy, and Human Services Finance Committees.

=== Abortion ===
Kotyza-Witthuhn is pro-choice, criticized the overturning of Roe v. Wade, and was a founding member of the Reproductive Freedom Caucus. In 2023, she authored the Minnesota House's H.F. 1, also known as the Protect Reproductive Options Act, or PRO Act. The bill added a "fundamental right" to "continue the pregnancy and give birth, or obtain an abortion" in state law. It also protects rights to contraception, sterilization, family planning, and counseling. The bill passed the House on January 19 and was signed by Governor Tim Walz on January 31, 2023.

=== Education and child care ===
Kotyza-Witthuhn has spoken about the challenges of being a mother to a young child while in the legislature, and about the benefits of remote work for legislators with children at home. She authored legislation to significantly increase Parent Aware funding, which funds day care and early-learning providers. She has supported proposals to increase prenatal and early childhood education.

=== Other political positions ===
Kotyza-Witthuhn authored a bill to reinstate the angel tax credit program, giving tax breaks to investors who help start businesses in Minnesota. She also introduced legislation to ban nonessential PFAS chemicals in children's products.

== Electoral history ==
2018 Minnesota State House - District 48B
Party	Candidate	Votes	%
Democratic (DFL)	Carlie Kotyza-Witthuhn	10,397	50.53
Republican	Jenifer Loon (incumbent)	10,156	49.36
Write-in		24	0.12
Total votes		20,577	100.0
Democratic (DFL) gain from Republican			

2020 Minnesota State House - District 48B
Party	Candidate	Votes	%
Democratic (DFL)	Carlie Kotyza-Witthuhn (incumbent)	13,410	55.00
Republican	Holly Link	10,962	44.96
Write-in		12	0.05
Total votes		24,384	100.0
Democratic (DFL) hold			

2022 Minnesota State House - District 49B
Party	Candidate	Votes	%
Democratic (DFL)	Carlie Kotyza-Witthuhn (incumbent)	11,406	57.62
Republican	Thomas Knecht	8,374	42.30
Write-in		15	0.08
Total votes		19,795	100.0
Democratic (DFL) hold			

2024 Minnesota State House - District 49B
Party	Candidate	Votes	%
Democratic (DFL)	Carlie Kotyza-Witthuhn (incumbent)	13,529	57.11
Republican	Wendi Russo	10,138	42.8
Write-in		21	0.09
Total votes		23,688	100.00
Democratic (DFL) hold			

== Personal life ==
Kotyza-Witthuhn and her husband, Rory, have four children, three of whom were adopted from the foster care system. They reside in Eden Prairie, Minnesota, and attend St. Stephen's Episcopal Church in Edina.
