= Locke v. Karass =

- Supreme Court of the United States

Argued October 6, 2008 Decided January 21, 2009
- Full case name: Daniel B. Locke, et al., Petitioners v. Edward A. Karass, State Controller, et al.
- Docket no.: 07-610
- Citations: 555 U.S. 207 (more) 129 S. Ct. 798; 172 L. Ed. 2d 552; 2009 U.S. LEXIS 590

Case history
- Prior: Preliminary injunction denied, 382 F. Supp. 2d 181 (D. Me. 2005); summary judgment granted in favor of defendants, 425 F. Supp. 2d 137 (D. Me. 2006); affirmed, 498 F.3d 49 (1st Cir. 2007); cert. granted, 552 U.S. 1178 (2008).

Holding
- The local unit of a union may assess non-members a service fee to cover national litigation if that litigation involves collective bargaining or other issues which could conceivably involve the local unit and if the payment by the local unit is reciprocal.

Court membership
- Chief Justice John Roberts Associate Justices John P. Stevens · Antonin Scalia; Anthony Kennedy · David Souter; Clarence Thomas · Ruth Bader Ginsburg; Stephen Breyer · Samuel Alito

Case opinions
- Majority: Breyer, joined unanimously
- Concurrence: Alito, joined by Roberts, Scalia

Laws applied
- U.S. Const. amend. I

Locke v. Karass, 555 U.S. 207 (2009), is a court case in which the Supreme Court of the United States held that the Constitution permits the local chapter of a labor union to charge a "service fee" to non-members to cover non-local litigation expenses if (a) the expenses are "appropriately related to collective bargaining" and (b) there is a reciprocal relationship between the local chapter and the national union. The case expanded on and clarified the earlier Lehnert v. Ferris Faculty Association, which permitted such service fees for non-political activities but did not reach a consensus on whether "national" expenses were chargeable.

== Background ==
The Maine State Employees Association is the exclusive bargaining agent for certain employees of Maine's executive branch. The Association is also Local 1989 of the Service Employees International Union (SEIU). Per the terms of Maine's collective bargaining agreement with the association all non-member employees represented by the union must pay a "service fee"; effectively union dues but recalculated to include only the amount which would go to "ordinary representational activities, e.g., collective bargaining or contract administration." The Supreme Court previously upheld such arrangements in Lehnert, but was unable to reach agreement on whether national litigation was "chargeable": that is, whether a union may include such costs as part of a service fee charged to non-union employees.

Non-member employees challenged the inclusion of national litigation costs by the parent SEIU in arbitration but the arbitrator deemed the inclusion lawful. Concurrent with the arbitration the employees brought suit in federal court, alleging a First Amendment violation. The District Court found the fee lawful, and the Court of Appeals upheld the District Court on appeal. The Supreme Court granted certiorari to resolve a split between the circuits.

== Opinion of the Court ==
The Supreme Court held that the local unit of a union may assess non-members a service fee to cover national litigation if that litigation involves collective bargaining or other issues which could conceivably involve the local unit and if the payment by the local unit is reciprocal. Justice Breyer wrote for a unanimous court; Justice Alito wrote a concurrence in which Chief Justice Roberts and Justice Scalia joined.

The central question was whether the national litigation fee caused a First Amendment problem. Prior rulings by the court permitted a so-called "service fee" provided that the fees did not include political and/or ideological activities, which would have the effect of forcing employees to underwrite political speech. Previous rulings, including Ellis and Lehnert, had not resolved this question. To address the issue Breyer's opinion introduced a two-factor test: a national litigation fee is chargeable "if (1) the subject matter of the national litigation bears an appropriate relation to collective bargaining and (2) the arrangement is reciprocal—that is, the local's payment to the national affiliate is for 'services that may ultimately inure to the benefit of the members of the local union by virtue of their membership in the parent organization.'"

Alito wrote a concurring opinion noting that the question of what "reciprocity" was had not been reached, given that all the courts had agreed, and the petitioners had not challenged, that reciprocity (whatever that was) existed between the local unit and the national union.

== See also ==
- List of United States Supreme Court cases, volume 555
- List of United States Supreme Court cases
- List of United States Supreme Court cases involving the First Amendment
