= 2018 Missouri Proposition A =

Proposition A
- August 7, 2018
- Do the people of the state of Missouri want to adopt Senate Bill 19 ("Right-to-Work") as passed by the general assembly in 2017?

Results
Choice	Votes	%
Yes	453,283	32.53%
No	939,973	67.47%
Total votes	1,393,256	100.00%
County results
Yes
60–70%
50–60%
No
80–90%
70–80%
60–70%
50–60%

2018 Missouri Proposition A was a veto referendum ballot measure held on August 7, 2018, to determine whether to uphold or overturn a right-to-work law passed by the Missouri General Assembly in 2017. The law was defeated, resulting in its repeal.

== Background ==
Right-to-work laws prohibit requiring employees who are not union members to contribute to the costs of union representation. Right-to-work legislation had been previously passed by the Missouri General Assembly in 2015, but was vetoed by Democratic governor Jay Nixon. Following the election of Republican governor Eric Greitens in 2016, the Assembly again passed a right-to-work law, which was signed by Greitens. However, opponents of the law gathered enough signatures to force a veto referendum, preventing it from going into effect until the referendum was held.

== Contents ==
The proposition appeared on the ballot as follows:

Do the people of the state of Missouri want to adopt Senate Bill 19 ("Right-to-Work") as passed by the general assembly in 2017, which prohibits as a condition of employment the forced membership in a labor organization (union) or forced payments of dues in full or pro-rata (fair-share); make any activity which violates employees' rights illegal and ineffective; allow legal remedies for anyone injured as a result of another person violating or threatening to violate employees' rights; and which shall not apply to union agreements entered into before the effective date of Senate Bill 19?

State and local government entities expect no costs or savings.

A "yes" vote will adopt Senate Bill 19 ("right-to-work"), passed by the general assembly in 2017. If adopted, Senate Bill 19 will amend Missouri law to prohibit, as a condition of employment, forced membership in a labor organization (union) or forced payments of dues or fees, in full or pro-rata ("fair-share"), to a union. Senate Bill 19 will also make any activity which violates employees' rights provided by the bill illegal and ineffective and allow legal remedies for anyone injured as a result of another person violating or threatening to violate those employees' rights. Senate Bill 19 will not apply to union agreements entered into before the effective date of Senate Bill 19, unless those agreements are amended or renewed after the effective date of Senate Bill 19.

A "no" vote will reject Senate Bill 19 ("right-to-work"), and will result in Senate Bill 19 not becoming Missouri law.

If passed, this measure will have no impact on taxes.

Should this proposal be adopted?

A lawsuit was filed in Cole County to change the ballot title, arguing that using the word "adopt" was misleading, given that the law had already been passed by the General Assembly. Circuit court judge Daniel Green ruled in favor of the plaintiffs, re-writing the ballot title. The case was appealed to the Western District of the Missouri Court of Appeals, which reversed the initial ruling.

== Results ==
The law was defeated in a landslide, with 67.5% of voters voting to repeal it.

Proposition A
Choice	Votes	%
For	453,283	32.53
Against	939,973	67.47
Total	1,393,256	100.00
