= Merit shop =

A merit shop is term which refers to a firm or organization that pays certain employees by merit (experience/worth to company). Contrary to popular belief, a merit shop can be non-union or union shop. Management retains the right to perform hiring, promotion, salary adjustments, bonuses, and termination, based on the laws of the state and federal government, along with its evaluation of individual's ability to accomplish the tasks assigned to them by the employer.

By law, such decisions will not be biased by age, race, national origin, organizational affiliation, seniority, color, creed and sex. The term "merit shop" was coined by John Trimmer, who served from 1952 to 1976 as an officer of the Associated Builders and Contractors, an American trade association of primarily non-union construction contractors. In common usage, "merit shop" is often synonymous with being non-union or open shop.

== See also ==
- Closed shop
