= Hiring hall =

Labor organization

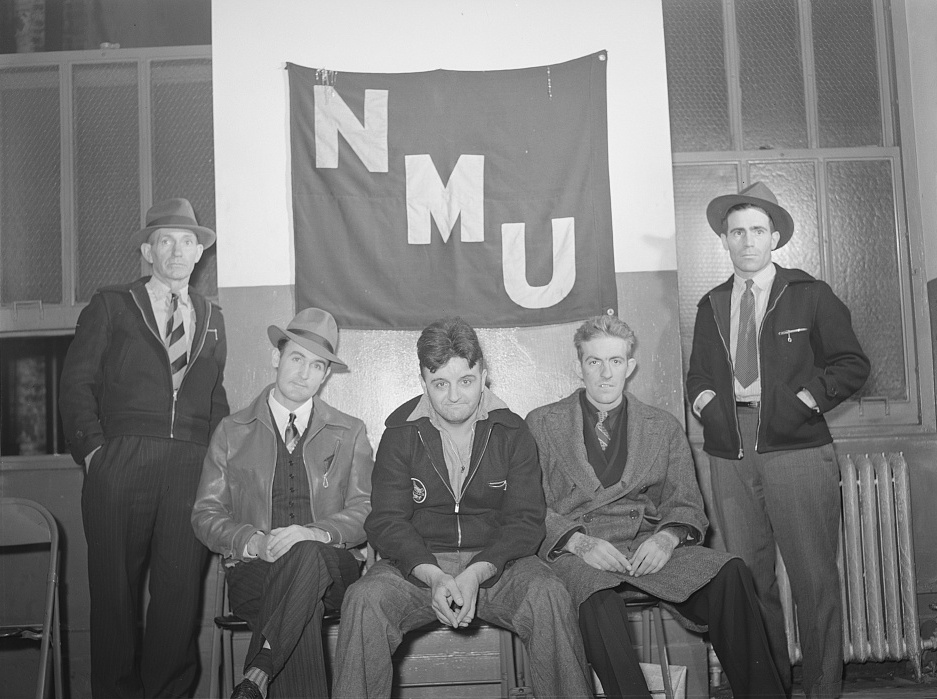
Seamen in hiring hall, National Maritime Union banner, New York City, December 1941. Photograph: Arthur Rothstein

In organized labor, a hiring hall is an organization, usually under the auspices of a labor union, which has the responsibility of furnishing new recruits for employers who have a collective bargaining agreement with the union. It may also refer to a physical union hall, the office from which the union may conduct its activities.

The employer's use of the hiring hall may be voluntary, or it may be compulsory by the terms of the employer's collective agreement with a union. Exclusive use of a hiring hall effectively turns employers into a closed shop because employees must join the union before they can be hired.

Arguments in favor of the institution include that the presence of a hiring hall places the responsibility on the union to ensure that its members are suitably qualified and responsible individuals before assigning them to an employer. The union will often enforce a basic code of conduct among its members to ensure smooth operation of the hiring hall (to prevent members from double-booking, for example). If a hiring hall is reputable, the relationship between the union and the employer can be relatively harmonious. There are arguments that this actually benefits contractors who hire employees for the duration of a specific job. This is primarily due to the union handling qualifications and other eligibility requirements. Additionally, the union will also maintain employment records on the individual, meaning that behavior issues from other employers can be documented and reacted to. Thus there is a strong incentive to maintain good conduct to keep union membership. Workers benefit from having a more stable source of benefits such as insurance and pension plans. Contractors are still responsible for paying into these plans, but union members are more protected from lapses in coverage.

== Usage by industry ==
In the early 1900s hiring practices in the precarious maritime industry varied, ranging from outright criminal corruption, to favoritism and employer hiring agencies. With the passage of the 1935 Wagner Act, union hiring halls replaced previous hiring procedures. It shifted power towards unions, including a preference for union membership. In cases where union-membership was a legal prerequisite for being hired, this is called a closed-shop. While corruption was reduced, it still allowed for union corruption, for example dispelling dissidents or dual-union members. The Taft-Hartley Act intended to reduce union influence or discrimination here to non-union members, effectively curbing closed-shop practices while permitting union hiring halls to continue to exist.

In building and construction trade, due to the scattered nature of workplaces and bidding projects, both the employees and employers have a symbiotic need for steady employment and skilled labor respectively, which are facilitated in the various craft union controlled hiring halls.

Employment in the film industry in the 1950s became more differentiated, due to anti-trust rulings, e.g United States v. Paramount Pictures which divested studios from exclusive contracts with specific theaters. Film production itself became heavily distributed, with post-production, editing being fulfilled by different contracts rather than centrally. Recruiting talent was no longer based on employment in a single firm, but through a roster that measured seniority within the industry. These rosters were maintained by talent guilds and unions such as IATSE, SAG-AFTRA, Actors' Equity Association.

Uber has been described as a for-profit hiring hall, to the benefit of Uber, rather than the drivers.

The prevalence of compulsory hiring hall arrangements in Canada varies from trade to trade and from province to province, since labor law there is under provincial jurisdiction. The situation in Europe also varies from country to country.

== See also ==
- Employment agency
