= Closed shop =

Labour arrangement where the employer must hire unionised members

A pre-entry closed shop (or simply closed shop) is a form of union security agreement under which the employer agrees to hire union members only, and employees must remain members of the union at all times to remain employed. This is different from a post-entry closed shop (US: union shop), which is an agreement requiring all employees to join the union if they are not already members. In a union shop, the union must accept as a member any person hired by the employer. By comparison, an open shop does not require union membership of potential and current employees.

International Labour Organization covenants do not address the legality of closed shop provisions, leaving the question up to each individual nation. The legal status of closed shop agreements varies widely from country to country, ranging from bans on the agreement, to extensive regulation of the agreement to not mentioning it at all.

== Legal status ==
=== Council of Europe ===
In the case of Sørensen & Rasmussen v. Denmark (applications nos. 52562/99 and 52620/99) handed down on 11 January 2006, the European Court of Human Rights found that a requirement to join a specific trade union in order to gain employment, enforceable under Danish law, was a violation of the complainants' Article 11 right to freedom of association, which includes the right not to belong to an association. The court cited a previous case, Young, James and Webster v United Kingdom (1981), in which dismissal for refusing to join a trade union because of a closed-shop agreement, where the requirement had not been a condition of employment, was likewise held to be a breach of Article 11.

=== United Kingdom ===
Stephen Dunn and John Gennard in 1984 found 111 UK cases of dismissals on the introduction of a closed shop, involving 325 individuals, and they stated, "While proponents of the closed shop may argue that an estimated minimum 325 dismissals is a relatively small number compared with the total population covered by closed shops, critics would see the figure as substantial arguing that one dismissal is one too many". In relation to the pre-entry closed shop, they stated, "Its raison d'être is to exclude people from jobs by denying them union membership".

All forms of closed shops in the UK are illegal following the introduction of the Employment Act 1990. They were further curtailed under section 137(1)(a) of the Trade Union and Labour Relations (Consolidation) Act 1992 (c. 52) passed by the Conservative government at the time. The Labour Party, then in opposition, had supported closed shops until December 1989, when it abandoned the policy in accordance with European legislation. Equity was one of the last trade unions in the United Kingdom to offer a pre-entry closed shop until the 1990 act.

The famous English tort law case of Rookes v Barnard concerned a closed shop agreement.

=== United States ===
The Taft–Hartley Act outlawed the closed shop in the United States in 1947. The union shop was ruled illegal by the Supreme Court. States with right-to-work laws go further by not allowing employers to require employees to pay a form of union dues, called an agency fee. An employer may not lawfully agree with a union to hire only union members, but it may agree to require employees to join the union or pay the equivalent of union dues to it within a set period after starting employment. Similarly, a union could require an employer that had agreed to a closed shop contract prior to 1947 to fire an employee who had been expelled from the union for any reason, but it cannot demand an employer to fire an employee under a union shop contract for any reason other than failure to pay dues that are required by all employees.

The US government does not permit union shops in any federal agency, regardless of state laws.

Construction unions and unions in other industries with similar employment patterns have coped with the prohibition of closed shops by using exclusive hiring halls as a means of controlling the supply of labor. Such exclusive hiring halls do not strictly and formally require union membership as a condition of employment, but they do so in practical terms since an employee seeking to be dispatched to work through the union's hiring hall must pay union dues or a roughly-equivalent hiring hall fee. If the hiring hall is run on a non-discriminatory basis and adheres to clearly-stated eligibility and dispatch standards, it is lawful.

The Taft–Hartley Act also prohibits unions from requiring unreasonably-high initiation fees as a condition of membership to prevent unions from using initiation fees as a device to keep non-union employees out of a particular industry. Also, the National Labor Relations Act permits construction employers to enter pre-hire agreements in which they agree to draw their workforces from a pool of employees dispatched by the union. The NLRA prohibits pre-hire agreements outside the construction industry.

For the entertainment industry, unions representing performers have as their most important rule banning any represented performer from working on any non-union production. Penalties are imposed on the union member, not the employer, and can lead to loss of union membership. Most major productions are union productions, and non-members join SAG-AFTRA, the country's main union of actors and performing artists, by performing as extras and earning three union vouchers or by being given a speaking line and entering that way. The other performance unions do not have minimum membership standards, but those who join them are prohibited from working on non-union productions.

=== Canada ===
The status of closed shops varies from province to province within Canada. The Supreme Court has ruled that Section Two of the Charter of Rights and Freedoms guaranteed both the freedom to associate and the freedom not to associate, but employees in a work-environment largely dominated by a union were beneficiaries of union policies and so should pay union fees, regardless of membership status. However, religious and conscientious objectors were allowed the option of paying the amount to a registered charity instead.

=== Australia ===
All forms of closed shops in the Commonwealth are illegal under federal workplace laws. Discriminating against an employee, or prospective employee, due to their status as a union, or non-union, member is considered an "adverse action" and is hence illegal under S.342 of the Fair Work Act 2009.

== See also ==
- Merit shop
- Master contract (labor)
- Bump (union)
- Agency shop
