= NLRB v. General Motors Corp. =

National Labor Relations Board v. General Motors Corporation
- Supreme Court of the United States

Argued April 18, 1963 Decided June 3, 1963
- Full case name: National Labor Relations Board v. General Motors Corporation
- Citations: 373 U.S. 734 (more)

Court membership
- Chief Justice Earl Warren Associate Justices Hugo Black · William O. Douglas; Tom C. Clark · John M. Harlan II; William J. Brennan Jr. · Potter Stewart; Byron White · Arthur Goldberg

Case opinion
- Majority: Stewart, joined by unanimous

NLRB v. General Motors Corp., 373 U.S. 734 (1963) is a U.S. Supreme Court decision that clarified the definition of "membership" in labor unions under the National Labor Relations Act (NLRA). The court upheld that the requirement of employees paying union fees as a condition of employment does not violate federal labor law, whether they formally join the union or not. The ruling helped unions gain a better ability to collect financial support from all employees they represent.

== Background ==
This case rose due to the rise of labor unions in the United States. After the National Labor Relations Act was passed in 1935, unions gained the right to represent employees, and collect financial support. Eventually, labor unions pushed for stronger measures, including "union shop" and "agency shop" arrangements. These would require all employees to join the union, or pay dues to help support the union representing them. These measures were designed to prevent any employees benefiting from the union without contributing anything to it financially.

The disagreement in this case was between the United Auto Workers and General Motors. The UAW was the party that wanted all workers to help pay the union for their work whether they were members or not. General Motors refused as they were not sure if it was legal or not to require their workers to do so, and they felt that it forced employees into membership of the union. With GM refusing, the UAW decided to seek an agreement with GM that would require all employees to pay union dues.

== Argument ==
The National Labor Relations Board (NLRB) sided with the union, and filed a complaint against General Motors. This complaint alleged that the company's refusal to implement the agency shop agreement constituted an unfair labor practice. The key argument given by the NLRB was that the NLRA allowed unions and employers to require payment for dues from all employees, only as long was forced to become a member of the union.

General Motors argued that forcing employees to pay dues violated employees' rights under sections 7, 8 (a) (1), and 8 (a) (3) of the NLRA, which prohibits discrimination based on membership status in a union. This also made the employer not obliged to bargain over it.

== Lower Courts ==
The United States Sixth Circuit Court of Appeals handled the case before it reached the U.S. Supreme Court, and they ruled in favor of General Motors. This decision was made as the court interpreted the requirement to pay union dues was a violation of employee rights. The proposed agency shop arrangement would be in violation of multiple provisions of the NLRA.

== Supreme Court Decision ==
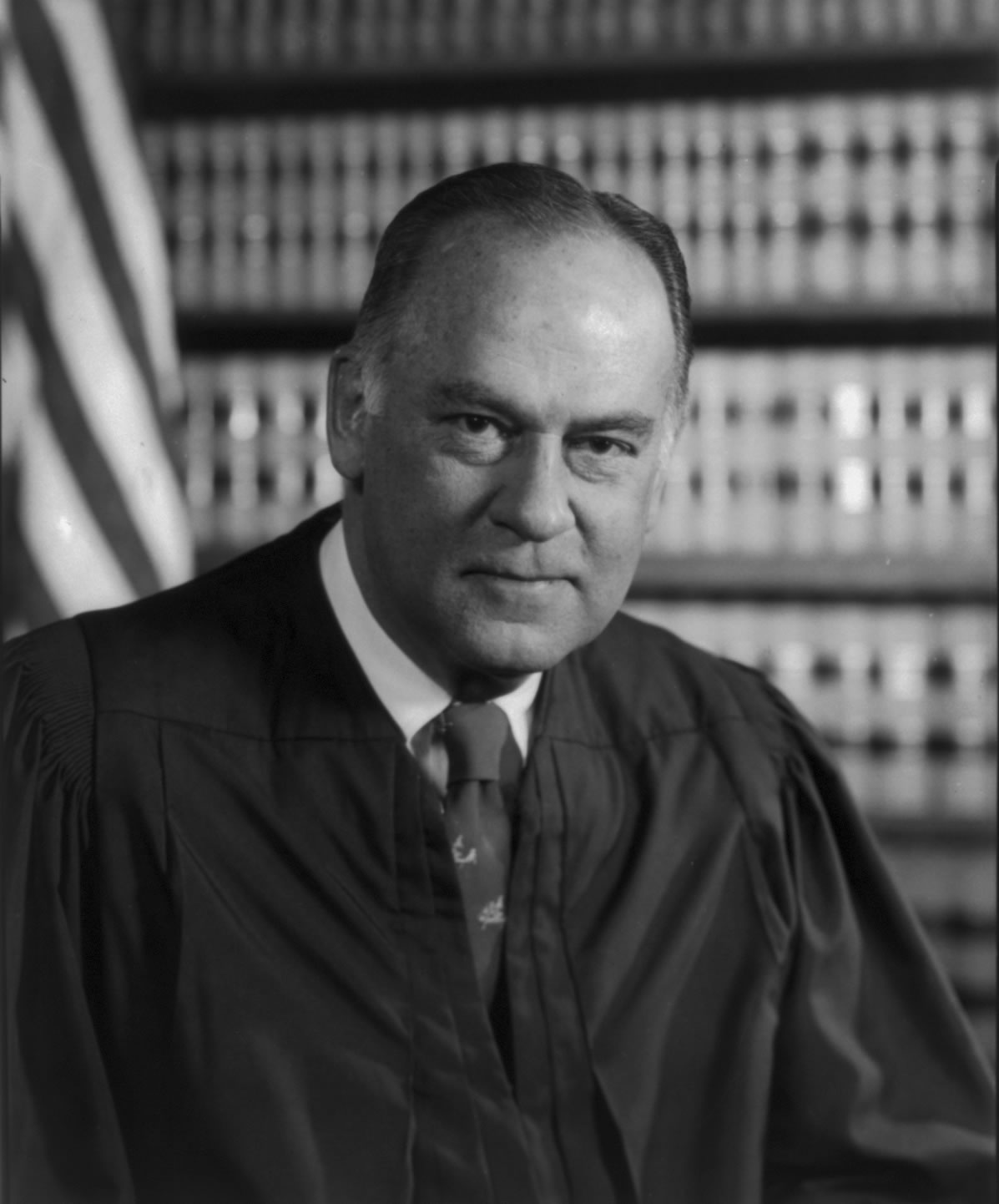
Justice Potter Stewart authored the majority opinion of the Court.

The Supreme Court reversed the decision made by the lower court, favoring the union's argument. It was a unanimous decision, authored by Justice Potter Stewart. It was clarified by the court that under section 8 (a) (3) of the NLRA, "membership" does not mean full participation in a union, rather it means meeting the obligation to pay dues. It was found by the court that as long as they're used for "collective bargaining" and other related purposes, requiring payments for dues from non-members was lawful. The court made an emphasis that such financial support does not infringe on employees' rights, as long as the union does not require participation in its internal activities. This ruling ensured that unions had the ability to obtain financial contributions from all workers they represent, while also preserving the freedom of association and choice regarding union involvement for all individual workers.

== Significance ==
NLRB v. General Motors is an important case in the development of United States Labor Laws. This case established the legal foundation for agency shop arrangements, which are where unions can require dues or fees from all employees the union represents. The ruling assisted unions with avoiding any financial burdens that could come with representing non-paying members, as well as preventing any free-riders. The decision clarified the definition of "membership" under the NLRA, making it limited to financial support rather than commitment or active participation. This distinction provided an influence on future cases and labor policies involving union security clauses.
