= Open shop =

Place of employment where union paying or membership is not required

An open shop is a place of employment at which one is not required to join or financially support a union (closed shop) as a condition of hiring or continued employment.

== Open shop vs closed shop ==
The major difference between an open and closed shop is the requirement for union membership. There are a variety of opinions regarding the benefits and negatives of open shops.

=== Pros vs. cons of open shops ===
In the United States, the introduction of 'right to work' laws has been linked with lower overall benefits but higher economic growth by some proponents. Such conclusions are debatable, however, as employment, investment, and income in traditionally unionized sectors of the economy cannot be correlated to the passage of such laws.

=== Union arguments ===
Open shop means a factory, office, or other business establishment in which a union, chosen by a majority of the employees, acts as representative of all the employees in making agreements with the employer, but union membership is not a condition of being hired.

Unions have argued against the open shop adopted by United States employers in the first decade of the twentieth century, seeing it as an attempt to drive unions out of industries. For example, construction craft unions have always relied on controlling the supply of labor in particular trades and geographical areas as a means of maintaining union standards and establishing collective bargaining relations with the employers in that field.

In order to do that, unions argued, construction unions—and to a lesser extent unions representing musicians, longshore workers, restaurant employees, and others who work on a transitory and relatively brief basis—must require that employers hire only their members.

The open shop was also a key component of the American Plan introduced in the 1920s. In that era the open shop was directed not only at construction unions but also unions in mass production industries. Unions again felt that these proposed policies would give employers the opportunity to discriminate against union members in employment and would also lead to a steadfast opposition to collective bargaining of any sort

== Legal status ==
=== United States ===
The open shop is legal in the United States. Employers are under no legal compulsion to enter into union security agreements.

The open shop is enforced in those states that have adopted right-to-work laws. In these states, employers are barred from enforcing union security arrangements and may not fire an employee for failure to pay union dues.

=== Canada ===
The term open shop is also used similarly in Canada, mostly in reference to construction contractors that have at least a partially non-union workforce. Canadians enjoy the freedom to associate, guaranteed by the Charter of Rights and Freedoms, inherently including the right not to associate.

In various Canadian provinces, certain 'open shop' organizations have formed. Many of these organizations claim that small contractors are not adequately protected by current labour legislation.

As labour law is a provincial jurisdiction in Canada, the laws vary from province to province. However, there is some common ground. Despite opposition from open shop contractors, in Ontario, the Liberal government recently reinstituted the card-based certification system that was in place for most of the post-World War II period. Card-based certification was reinstated only for the construction industry. It allows workers to certify an exclusive bargaining agent on the basis of membership, sometimes known as "majority sign-up". Some observers claim that this system creates a risk of employees being misled by business agents. Others assert that it overcomes the natural advantage that employers in opposition to unionization have over their employees.

Some of these associations permit construction contractors that are unionized to join. Several companies whose employees are represented by the Christian Labour Association of Canada (CLAC), a union with non-traditional rules of membership, are members of the association. CLAC's roots trace to the Christian labour movement in the Netherlands.

== Janus v. AFSCME ==
Janus v. American Federation of State, County, and Municipal Employees, Council 31, US (2018) is a US labor law case, concerning whether governments violate the First Amendment when they require their employees to pay fees to a union as a condition of employment.

In February 2015, Illinois Republican Governor Bruce Rauner filed suit, claiming that fair-share agreements are unconstitutional and a violation of the First Amendment right to free speech.

In March 2015, three government workers from Illinois represented by attorneys from the Illinois-based Liberty Justice Center and Virginia-based National Right to Work Legal Defense Foundation took legal action to intervene in the case. In May 2015, Rauner was dropped from the case, after a federal judge ruled that the governor did not have standing to bring such a suit, but the case proceeded under a new name, Janus v. AFSCME. The case is named after Mark Janus, an Illinois child support specialist covered by a collective bargaining agreement.

Janus claimed that he should not need to pay fees to the American Federation of State, County and Municipal Employees because doing so constitutes paying for political speech with which Janus disagrees. This became permissible after a 1977 decision by the US Supreme Court in Abood v. Detroit Board of Education. The outcome of the case was in favor of Janus and as such non-union members cannot be compelled to pay fees in accordance with a given fair-share agreement that is in place with respect to a union.

== See also ==
- Right-to-work law
- Employers Group, former the Merchants and Manufacturers Association, fought for the open shop
- Agency shop
- Closed shop, the opposite of an 'open shop', where union membership is a requirement of employment
