= Union shop =

Employer-union agreement in which the employer only employs union members

In labor law, a union shop, also known as a post-entry closed shop, is a form of a union security clause. Under this, the employer agrees to either only hire labor union members or to require that any new employees who are not already union members become members within a certain amount of time. Use of the union shop varies widely from nation to nation, depending on the level of protection given trade unions in general.

== Canada ==
In 1946, Justice Ivan Rand of the Supreme Court of Canada crafted what became known as the "Rand formula". Appointed as arbiter to settle the Ford Strike of 1945, Rand concluded that both federal and provincial labor law made strong trade unions national policy. If workers were allowed to opt out of paying union dues, the free rider problem would undermine this policy. Rand went further to argue that the free rider problem undermines workplace order by causing resentment between union and non-union employees.

Rand's decision required all workers to pay union dues, but protected the right of workers to not join the union or otherwise participate in sustaining it. In the late 1940s and 1950s, many Canadian provinces incorporated the "Rand formula" into their labor laws. By 1997, the federal government and six provinces (British Columbia, Manitoba, Newfoundland, Ontario, Quebec, and Saskatchewan) imposed the Rand formula on labor relations. Most of the laws provided for a religious exemption that imposed donation to a charity rather than union dues.

By 1994, 9 percent of collective bargaining agreements in Canada required the closed shop, while 42.3 percent required the union shop and 39.2 percent used the Rand formula. Just 3 percent used the agency shop, while 6.5 percent had the open shop. Alberta appointed an investigative committee in 1994 to see if adoption of American-style "right to work" laws would benefit the province. The committee strongly rejected the policy after Albertan employers strongly supported the union shop. Union shop clauses in Canadian collective bargaining agreements were enforceable.

The closed shop is legal in all Canadian jurisdictions as of 2006, and unions may (if they wish) negotiate forms of union security agreements that provide less than the union shop.

== Japan ==
Article 7, Section 1 of the Trade Union Act of 1949 of Japan specifically permits the negotiation of union shop provisions, provided that the union represents a majority of workers at the worksite. However, Article 28 of the Constitution of Japan protects freedom of association. Japanese courts have wrestled with the two conflicting legal values, and found that the right to organize is superior to the right to freedom of association. However, court have crafted five conditions for a union shop agreement to be accepted:

1. Workers must remain free to join a union that does not represent a majority of workers in the plant.
2. If a worker withdraws from the majority union to join the minority union, the union shop agreement may no longer cover the withdrawing worker.
3. New workers retain the right to join a union that does not represent a majority of workers in the plant, and cannot be forced to join the majority union.
4. The union shop agreement is nullified if a union no longer represents a majority of workers at the worksite.
5. If a worker withdraws from the majority union to form a new union, the union shop agreement may no longer cover the withdrawing worker.

Article 17 of the Trade Union Act requires that the collective bargaining agreement be extended to all workers of the same type if 75 percent of that class of the employer's workers are already covered by the agreement. Although this may appear to impose the union shop, in practice defining what constitutes a "similar type of worker" has proven too difficult and Section 17 is rarely enforced.

In 1996, 62.1 percent of all Japanese collective bargaining agreements contained a union shop provision. As of 1999, 60 percent did so. Other forms of union security agreements, such as the closed shop and agency shop, are extremely rare.

Japanese labor law treats large employers differently from small employers, and union shop provisions are much less likely to be negotiated in small workplaces. For example, Chalmers cites 1979 data showing that 50 percent of all workplaces in Japan had a union shop provision. But while 73 percent of employers with more than 1,000 workers had such agreements, just 59 percent of employers with 500 to 999 workers did so. Some agreements are ambiguously worded, making their enforcement problematic. Other union shop provisions are tied to various requirements that the union promote "industrial peace", such as mandatory arbitration for all disputes and a relinquishment of the right to strike.

== United States ==
The Labor Management Relations Act of 1947 (also known as the Taft-Hartley Act) made the closed shop illegal in the United States. The Supreme Court in Pattern Makers v. NLRB, 473 U.S. 95 (1985), also held that a union member may resign from the union at any time without notice, thereby enabling the worker to work during a strike without being subject to sanctions from the union. Under the National Labor Relations Act (NLRA), as amended by the Taft-Hartley Act, and held by the Supreme Court in Communications Workers of America v. Beck, in a union security agreement, unions are authorized by statute to collect from non-members only those fees and dues necessary to perform its duties as a collective bargaining representative known as agency fees. Compelling payment of agency fees from non-union employees in the public sector was held unconstitutional in Janus v. AFSCME, in June 2018. The agency fee is that portion of union dues that is attributable to the cost of representing employees in collective bargaining and in providing services to all represented employees, but not, with certain exceptions, to the union's political activities or organizing employees of other employers. Additional restrictions apply to unions covered by the Railway Labor Act (RLA) and unionized governmental employees.

The NLRA requires that employees must be given at least 30 days from the date of hire to join the union before they may be subject to being fired for failure to join the union or pay dues; shorter periods apply in the construction industry. The RLA gives employees 60 days to join the union. The union cannot, however, require that an employee become a member "in good standing" — that is, do more than pay dues or their equivalent. While a union shop agreement that, by its literal terms, requires an employee to become a member in good standing might appear to be unlawful on its face and therefore unenforceable, the National Labor Relations Board (NLRB) and the courts have uniformly interpreted such clauses to require no more than what the law permits (such as payment of dues).

Under United States labor law, a private sector union can expel a member from the union for any number of reasons, so long as it provides the member with the minimum due process required by the Labor Management Reporting and Disclosure Act (LMRDA) and does not do so for reasons prohibited by law (such as the member's race or protected political activities within the union). The union cannot, on the other hand, use a union shop agreement to require an employer to discharge a member for failure to maintain membership in good standing unless that member has been expelled from the union for failure to pay uniformly required union dues and fees. If the union expels a member for some reason other than failure to pay dues, it effectively terminates any right it might have had to demand that the employee pay dues thereafter or request that the employee be discharged for failure to do so.

The NLRA imposes additional requirements before a union can invoke a union shop agreement clause to require an employer to fire an employee who has failed to pay dues. While the union does not have to give the individual employee the sort of trial-type hearing required by the LMRDA to expel a union member for other reasons, the union must give the employee a detailed written explanation of the amount of delinquent dues that the employee owes and how those dues were calculated, and allow the employee a reasonable opportunity to pay those delinquent dues and fees before it asks that the employee be fired. In addition, the union must give all employees roughly the same opportunity to cure any delinquencies before requesting discharge; if the union gives one employee two weeks to pay delinquent dues, it must do the same for all others. The union is not, on the other hand, required to withdraw a request that an employee be fired for failure to pay delinquent dues if the employee makes the payment after the deadline but before the employer has effected the discharge. A union may owe back pay to employees who have been fired without these procedural protections; the employer may be liable if it effects the discharge when it knew or should have known that the union had not complied with the minimum requirements of the NLRA.

Under the NLRA, the union may demand payment only of those dues for periods when an employee was covered by a collective bargaining agreement that contained a valid union shop agreement. A union shop agreement may not be made retroactive to a period prior to the execution of the agreement. The union may not demand that an employee be fired for failure to pay extraordinary assessments that are not part of regularly, uniformly imposed dues. The LMRDA sets standards for the procedures that the union must follow when asking members to approve an increase in dues.

Union-represented employees covered by a union shop agreement may ask the NLRB to hold a "deauthorization election" to allow all bargaining unit employees to vote to determine whether the clause will continue to remain in effect. No such procedure exists under the RLA.

== United Kingdom ==
The term "union shop" is not used in the UK but it appears to be equivalent to a post-entry closed shop. These are not permitted by the Employment Act 1990.

== Holy See ==
The lay employees of the Vatican are members of a union shop, the Association of Vatican Lay Workers, making the Vatican the world's most unionized sovereign state.

== See also ==
- Agency shop
- Closed shop
- Open shop
- Right-to-work law
- Union security

== Bibliography ==
- Arnold, Roger A. Economics. Florence, Ky.: Cengage Learning, 2008.
- Chalmers, Norma. Industrial Relations in Japan: The Peripheral Sector. Florence, Ky.: Routledge, 2002.
- Hanami, Tadashi and Komiya, Fumito. Labour Law in Japan. The Netherlands: Kluwer Law International, 2011.
- Kagawa, Kozo. "Legal Problems With Multiple Labour Unions in a Japanese Company." In Work and Society: Labour and Human Resources in East Asia. Ian Nish and Keith Thurley, eds. Hong Kong: Hong Kong University Press, 1996.
- Kaufman, Bruce E. Government Regulation of the Employment Relationship. Madison, Wisc.: Industrial Relations Research Association, 1997.
- Miller, Roger LeRoy and Jentz, Gaylord A. Business Law Today. Florence, Ky.: Cengage Learning, 2012.
- Morely, Michael J.; Gunnigle, Patrick; and Collings, David G. Global Industrial Relations. Florence, Ky.: Routledge, 2006.
- Nakakubo, Hiroya. "Individualisation of Employment Relations in Japan: A Legal Analysis." In Employment Relations: Individualisation and Union Exclusion. Stephen Deery and Richard Mitchell, eds. Leichhardt, NWS, Australia: The Federation Press, 1999.
- Rees, Albert. The Economics of Trade Unions. Chicago: University of Chicago Press, 1989.
- Western, Bruce. Between Class and Market: Postwar Unionization in the Capitalist Democracies. Princeton, N.J.: Princeton University Press, 1999.
