= International Ass'n of Machinists v. Street =

Machinists v. Street
- Supreme Court of the United States

Argued April 21, 1960 Reargued January 17–18, 1961 Decided June 19, 1961
- Full case name: International Association of Machinists, et al. v. Street, et al.
- Citations: 367 U.S. 740 (more) 81 S. Ct. 1784; 6 L. Ed. 2d 1141; 1961 U.S. LEXIS 1997

Case history
- Prior: Appeal from the Supreme Court of Georgia

Holding
- A union may constitutionally compel contributions from dissenting nonmembers in an agency shop only for the costs of performing the union's statutory duties as exclusive bargaining agent.

Court membership
- Chief Justice Earl Warren Associate Justices Hugo Black · Felix Frankfurter; William O. Douglas · Tom C. Clark; John M. Harlan II · William J. Brennan Jr. Charles E. Whittaker · Potter Stewart

Case opinions
- Plurality: Brennan, joined by Warren, Clark, Stewart
- Concurrence: Douglas
- Concur/dissent: Whittaker
- Dissent: Black
- Dissent: Frankfurter, joined by Harlan

International Association of Machinists v. Street, 367 U.S. 740 (1961), was a United States labor law decision by the United States Supreme Court on labor union freedom to make collective agreements with employers to enroll workers in union membership, or collect fees for the service of collective bargaining.

== Judgment ==
The Supreme Court held that "a union may constitutionally compel contributions from dissenting nonmembers in an agency shop only for the costs of performing the union's statutory duties as exclusive bargaining agent."

== See also ==
- US labor law
- Duplex Printing Press Co. v. Deering
- List of United States Supreme Court cases, volume 367
