= Pattern Makers League of North America v. NLRB =

Pattern Makers v. NLRB
- Supreme Court of the United States

Argued February 27, 1985 Reargued April 22, 1985 Decided 27 June, 1985
- Full case name: Pattern Makers' League of North America, AFL-CIO v. NLRB
- Citations: 473 U.S. 95 (more)

Holding
- The NLRB's policy of affording employees a right to resign without paying union dues is not facially unlawful.

Court membership
- Chief Justice Warren E. Burger Associate Justices William J. Brennan Jr. · Byron White; Thurgood Marshall · Harry Blackmun; Lewis F. Powell Jr. · William Rehnquist; John P. Stevens · Sandra Day O'Connor

Case opinions
- Majority: Powell, joined by Burger, Rehnquist, O'Connor, White
- Concurrence: White
- Dissent: Blackmun, joined by Brennan, Marshall
- Dissent: Stevens

Pattern Makers League of North America v. NLRB, 473 U.S. 95 (1985), was a United States Supreme Court case in which the court held that the National Labor Relations Board's policy of affording employees a right to resign without paying union dues is not facially unlawful. The court deferred to the NLRB's expert judgment rather than come to a firm conclusion. In conjunction with NLRB v. Granite State Joint Board, this case supersedes the reasoning of Allis-Chalmers Corp. v. Lueck.

== Facts ==
The Pattern Makers League's constitution said resignations from the union were not permitted during a strike. It fined 10 members for resigning during a strike. The employer claimed to the National Labor Relations Board that the fine was an unfair labor practice under the National Labor Relations Act of 1935 §158(b)(1)(A).

The NLRB held it was an unfair labor practice. The Court of Appeals upheld the NLRB.

== Judgment ==
Justice Powell wrote the majority, a 5 to 4 opinion, holding that fines could not be enforced against non-union members. The provision in §158(b)(1)(A) allowing unions to have rules for 'retention of membership' does not allow rules restricting resignations from union membership during a strike.

Justices Blackmun, Brennan, Marshall, and Stevens dissented.

== See also ==
- US labor law
