= Union security agreement =

Contractual agreement between a trade union and an employer

A union security agreement is a contractual agreement, usually part of a union collective bargaining agreement, in which an employer and a trade or labor union agree on the extent to which the union may compel employees to join the union, and/or whether the employer will collect dues, fees, and assessments on behalf of the union.

== Rationale ==
The free-rider problem is often cited as the rationale for union security agreements. A classic study of the free rider problem is presented in Mancur Olson's 1965 work, The Logic of Collective Action. In labor relations, the free rider problem exists because the costs of organizing a union and negotiating a contract with the employer can be very high, and because employers will find it too cumbersome to adopt multiple wage and benefit scales, some or all non-union members may find that the contract benefits them as well.

Thus, the incentive is for some individual workers to "ride for free" by not paying the costs, which can lead to the collapse of the union and no collective bargaining agreement. If the union collapses, each worker may be worse off than if the union had negotiated the agreement. Union security agreements are one way of ensuring that all (or nearly all) workers pay their fair share of the costs of collective bargaining (e.g., join the union and pay dues).

One solution is for the state to provide rights (such as the right to administer welfare or pension funds, or to participate in a works council) or benefits (such as unemployment insurance) only to unions or their members. Another solution is for unions to engage in members-only collective bargaining, which restricts the benefits of the contract to union members.

== Legal status ==
The International Labour Organization's Right to Organise and Collective Bargaining Convention can "in no way be interpreted as authorising or prohibiting union security arrangements, such questions being matters for regulation in accordance with national practice."

Union security agreements are explicitly mentioned in the labor laws of many countries. They are regulated by law and in the United States and in the United Kingdom. In Canada, the legal status of the union security agreement varies from province to province and at the federal level, with a few provinces permitting but not requiring it but the majority of provinces (and the federal government) requiring it if the union requests it.

In most Western European countries, the closed shop (one form of the union security agreement) is typically banned, while other forms typically go unregulated in labor law. This is not universal; for example, in Germany both the right to join a union and the right not to join a union are equally protected by law and the courts, and all forms of union security agreements are banned. The law in Belgium has similar provisions. Still, since participation in the unemployment insurance system is compulsory and only unions have the right to administer this system, union membership in Belgium remains high.

Outside North America and Western Europe, the legal status of union security agreements varies even more widely. In New Zealand, as of 1988, the closed shop was compulsory where a union organized the workplace. In the Philippines, various types of union security agreements are permitted under labor law. In Mexico, the closed shop was mandatory until the early 1990s, when a change in federal law permitted the union shop, agency shop, or no agreement at all. But because of the political ties between unions and the governing party in Mexico and other ways in which Mexican law favors established unions, the closed shop is essentially still the norm.

Many countries, however, have not addressed the issue of union security agreements. Neither Indonesian nor Thai labor law addresses the issue, and in both countries collective bargaining, union administrative procedures, and dues collection are so weak that the union security issues rarely arise. In Australia, the legal status of union security agreements has varied widely across each state and the national government and over time. Australian labor law does not explicitly regulate union security agreements. However, various forms of the union security agreement have been favored at one time or another by each state, territory, or the national government, effectively regulating the favored type of union security agreement and disadvantaging its other forms.

== Types ==
Various types of union security agreements exist. Among the more common are:

- Closed shop—The employer agrees to hire only union members. An employee who resigns from the union must be dismissed.
- Union shop—The employer may hire anyone regardless of their union membership status, but the employee must join the union within a set time period (such as 30 days). An employee who resigns from the union must be dismissed.
- Agency shop—The employer may hire anyone regardless of their union membership status, and the employee need not join the union. However, all non-union employees must pay a fee (known as the "agency fee") to the union to cover the costs of collective bargaining (and, in some countries, other fees as well). An employee who resigns from the union may not be dismissed but must pay the agency fee.
- Fair share provision—The employer may hire anyone regardless of their union membership status, and the employee need not join the union. However, all non-union employees must pay a fee (known as the "fair share fee") to the union to cover the costs of collective bargaining. An employee who resigns from the union may not be dismissed but must pay the fair share fee. In public sector collective bargaining, where the agency shop is often outlawed, the fair share provision (almost identical to the agency fee) may be negotiated instead.
- Dues checkoff—A contract between the employer and union where the employer agrees to collect the dues, fees, assessments, and other monies from union members and/or non-members directly from each worker's paycheck and transmit those funds to the union on a regular basis.
- Some jurisdictions mandate an open shop, which does not require union membership or union dues.

== Janus v. AFSCME ==
Janus v. American Federation of State, County, and Municipal Employees, Council 31, _ US _ (2018) is a US labor law case, concerning whether governments violate the First Amendment when they require their employees to pay fees to a union as a condition of employment.

In February 2015, Illinois Republican Governor Bruce Rauner filed suit, claiming that fair-share agreements are unconstitutional and a violation of the First Amendment right to free speech.

In March 2015, three government workers from Illinois represented by attorneys from the Illinois-based Liberty Justice Center and Virginia-based National Right to Work Legal Defense Foundation took legal action to intervene in the case. In May 2015, Rauner was dropped from the case, after a federal judge ruled that the governor did not have standing to bring such a suit, but the case proceeded under a new name, Janus v. AFSCME. The case is named after Mark Janus, an Illinois child support specialist covered by a collective bargaining agreement.

Janus claimed that he should not need to pay fees to the American Federation of State, County and Municipal Employees because doing so constitutes paying for political speech with which Janus disagrees. This became permissible after a 1977 decision by the US Supreme Court in Abood v. Detroit Board of Education.

In June 2018, the US Supreme Court ruled in favor of Janus, in a 5–4 decision, and stated that "States and public-sector unions may no longer extract agency fees from nonconsenting employees".
