= Agency shop =

Form of union security agreement

An agency shop is a form of union security agreement where the employer may hire union or non-union workers, and employees need not join the union in order to remain employed. However, the non-union worker must pay a fee to cover collective bargaining costs. The fee paid by non-union members under the agency shop is known as the "agency fee".

Where the agency shop is illegal, as is common in labor law governing American public sector unions, a "fair share provision" may be agreed to by the union and the employer. The provision requires non-union employees to pay a "fair share fee" to cover the costs of the union's collective bargaining activities. The "fair share" is similar to the agency shop, but usually more restrictive as to what may be charged to the non-member. In Canada, the agency fee is usually known as the Rand formula. In the United States, compelling payment of agency fees from non-union employees in the public sector was held unconstitutional in Janus v. AFSCME, in June 2018. Rehmus and Kerner (1980) found that at the time, unions within the public sector had been experimenting with the use of agency shop. It was discovered that by the mid-1970s, "13 percent of state and local government agreements then contained agency shop provisions". Additionally, contemporary scholars had discussed about the controversial nature of "free riders" in that their elimination (by the use of agency shop) would bring about a more harmonious environment within the work force, thus leading to improved "labor-management relationships".

International Labour Organization covenants do not address the legality of agency fee provisions, leaving the question up to each individual nation. The legal status of agency shop agreements varies widely from country to country, ranging from bans on the agreement to extensive regulation of the agreement to not mentioning it at all.

== See also ==
- Closed shop
- Open shop
- Right-to-work law
- Union shop
