= MacDonnell =

- Language: Gaelic

Origin
- Meaning: "Son of Dòmhnall"
- Region of origin: Scotland, Ireland

Other names
- Variant forms: Donnell, MacDonell, McConnell, MacConnell, Donald, MacDonald, McDonald, Donaldson,

MacDonnell, Macdonnell, or McDonnell is a surname of Irish and Scottish origin. It is an anglicized form of the Gaelic patronymic Mac Dhòmhnaill, meaning "son of Dòmhnall". The Gaelic personal name Dòmhnall is a Gaelicised form of the name Donald, which is composed of the elements domno, meaning "world", and val, meaning "might" or "rule". The name is considered a variation of MacDonald.

MacDonnells are found in both Scottish and Irish nobility, where they have held an important role in the history of both countries.

== A ==
- Alasdair McDonnell (born 1949), Northern Irish politician and MP from Cushendall
- Alestair Ruadh MacDonnell (1725–1761), Scottish chief of Glengarry, secret agent and spy on Prince Charles Edward after 1750
- Alexander McDonnell, 9th Earl of Antrim (1935–2021), British peer from Northern Ireland
- Alexander McDonnell (chess player) (1798–1835), Irish chess master
- Alexander McDonnell (engineer) (1829–1904), Irish locomotive designer and Chief Mechanical Engineer
- Sir Alexander McDonnell, 1st Baronet (1794–1875), Anglo-Irish civil servant, commissioner of national education in Ireland
- Andy McDonell (1882–1942), Australian rules footballer
- Andy McDonnell (born 1990/1991), Gaelic footballer
- Angus McDonnell (1881–1966), English politician and MP from Dartford
- Antony MacDonnell, 1st Baron MacDonnell (1844–1925), Irish-born British politician, involved in the administration of India

== B ==
- Bernard C. McDonnell (1911–1959), New York assemblyman
- Bob McDonnell (born 1954), governor of Virginia; American politician
- Barry McDonnell (born 1944), Lord of Glencoe, Scotland

== C ==
- Charles James McDonnell (1928–2020), American Roman Catholic bishop
- Charlotte McDonnell, British musician and YouTube personality (charlieissocoollike, formerly Charlie McDonnell)
- Clare McDonnell (born 1967), English radio broadcaster and presenter
- Clark W. McDonnell (1870–1952), American politician from North Dakota

== D ==
- Dan McDonnell (born c. 1970), American college baseball coach

== E ==
- E. T. MacDonnell (fl. 1917–1918), American college football coach at Wake Forest University
- Eugene McDonnell (1926–2010), American programming language designer

== F ==
- Flora McDonnell (born 1963), Anglo-Irish artist, illustrator, and author of children's books; daughter of Alexander McDonnell

== G ==
- George Alcock MacDonnell (1830–1899), Irish chess master
- George Macdonell (British Army officer) (1780–1870), British Army officer
- Grady McDonnell (born 2008), Irish-Canadian footballer

== H ==
- Howard McDonnell (1909–1992), American politician from Mississippi
- Harold McDonell (1882–1965), English cricketer

== J ==
- James Macdonnell (Canadian politician) (1884–1973), Canadian soldier, lawyer, and politician from Ontario
- James MacKerras Macdonnell (1884–1973), Canadian lawyer and parliamentarian from Ontario
- James Macdonell (British Army officer) (1781–1857), Scottish military officer; fought at the Battle of Waterloo
- James Smith McDonnell (1899–1980), American businessman and aviation pioneer; founder of McDonnell Aircraft, later McDonnell-Douglas
- James McDonnell (born 1961), American musician better known as Slim Jim Phantom
- Joe McDonnell (ice hockey) (born 1961), Canadian professional ice hockey player
- Joe McDonnell (rugby player) (born 1973), New Zealand rugby union player
- Joe McDonnell (hunger striker) (1951–1981), Irish member of the Provisional IRA; died in IRA hunger strike
- John McDonnell (businessman) (born 1938), American aviation businessman, son of James Smith McDonnell
- John McDonnell (coach) (1938–2021), Irish-American college football coach
- John McDonnell (footballer) (born 1965), Irish football manager
- John McDonnell (politician) (born 1951), British politician and MP
- Johnny McDonnell (fl. 1908–1912), Irish footballer

== K ==
- Kyle MacDonnell (c. 1922–2004), American model, singer, and actress

== L ==
- Lara McDonnell (born 2003), Irish actress
- Leverne McDonnell (1963–2013), Australian actress
- Louisa McDonnell, Countess of Antrim (1855–1949), British peer
- Luke McDonnell (born 1959), American comic book artist and toy designer

== M ==
- Máel Sechnaill mac Domnaill (949–1022), High King of Ireland
- Mary McDonnell (born 1952), American film, stage, and television actress
- Megan McDonnell, American screenwriter
- Michael McDonnell (1882–1956), Chief Justice of Palestine
- Mike McDonnell (born 1966), American politician from Nebraska
- Moylan McDonnell (1889–1969), Canadian professional hockey player

== N ==
- Noelie McDonnell, Irish singer/songwriter
- Norman Macdonnell (1916–1979), American radio and television producer

== P ==
- Pat McDonnell (born 1950), Irish hurler
- Patrick McDonnell (born 1956), American comic book author
- Patrick McDonnell (actor) (contemporary), Irish actor and comedian
- Percy McDonnell (1858–1896), Australian cricketer
- Peter McDonnell (disambiguation)

== R ==
- Randal MacDonnell, 1st Earl of Antrim (d. 1636), Irish nobleman, 4th son of Sorley Boy MacDonnell
- Randal MacDonnell, 1st Marquess of Antrim (1609–1683), Roman Catholic landed magnate in Scotland and Ireland
- Ray MacDonnell (1928–2021), American actor
- Richard Graves MacDonnell (1814–1881), Anglo-Irish lawyer, judge, and colonial governor
- Roger MacDonnell, New Zealand advertising entrepreneur

== S ==
- Samuel McDonnell (1834–1910), Canadian politician from Nova Scotia
- Sanford N. McDonnell (1922–2012), American aviation businessman, nephew of James Smith McDonnell
- Shannon McDonnell (rugby league) (born 1987), Australian rugby league player
- Sophie McDonnell (born 1976), British television presenter
- Sorley Boy MacDonnell (Somhairle Buidh Mac Domhnaill) (1505–1590), Irish clan chieftain of the Clan MacDonnell
- Stephen McDonnell (hurler) (born 1989), Irish hurler for Glen Rovers and Cork
- Steven McDonnell (Gaelic footballer) (born 1979), Gaelic football player for Armagh

== T ==
- Terrence McDonnell (contemporary), American screenwriter
- Thomas McDonnell, Snr. (1788–1864), Irish-New Zealand businessman
- Thomas McDonnell (1831–1899), New Zealand military officer and writer
- Thomas Meton Macdonnell (1923–2022), American politician from Missouri
- Timothy A. McDonnell (1937–2026), American Roman Catholic bishop
- Tony McDonnell (born 1976), Irish football player
- Tony McDonnell (space scientist) (contemporary), British Professor of Planetary and Space Sciences

== V ==
- Valerie McDonnell (born 2004), American politician from New Hampshire

== W ==
- William McDonnell, 6th Earl of Antrim (1851–1918), British peer
- William McDonnell (1876–1941), American sport shooter and 1912 Olympic contestant

== See also ==
- Clan MacDonnell of Glengarry, branch of the Scottish Clan Donald, now predominantly in Canada due to mass negotiation of immigration during the Highland Clearances
- Clan MacDonald of Keppoch, branch of Clan Donald, who are sometimes referred to as MacDonnells
- Clan MacDonald of Dunnyveg, branch of the Scottish Clan Donald, where they are sometimes referred to as MacDonnells
- Clan MacDonnell of Antrim, Irish branch of the Scottish Clan Donald
