= McConnell =

McConnell may refer to:

== People ==
- McConnell (surname), people with the surname

== Places ==
=== Canada ===
- Lake McConnell, a large prehistoric lake
- McConnell Arena, an ice hockey arena in Montreal, Quebec
- McConnell Lake Provincial Park, in British Columbia
- McConnell River, in Nunavut
- McConnell Range, a mountain range in British Columbia

=== United States ===
- McConnell, Illinois, an unincorporated community
- McConnell, West Virginia, a census-designated place
- McConnell Peak, in California
- McConnell State Recreation Area, in California
- McConnell Air Force Base, near Wichita, Kansas
- McConnell House (disambiguation), various houses on the U.S. National Register of Historic Places
- McConnell Center, University of Louisville

=== Outer space ===
- 9929 McConnell, an asteroid

== Other uses ==
- McConnell baronets, in the Baronetage of the United Kingdom
- USS McConnell (DE-163), a World War II destroyer escort
- McConnell Cup, a bridge team competition for women

== See also ==
- McConnel (disambiguation)
- McConnells, South Carolina, a town
