= Trade Review Act =

Proposed U.S. legislation relating to trade policy

Trade Review Act of 2025
- Long title: A bill to provide for notification to, and review by, Congress with respect to the imposition of duties.
- Enacted by: the 119th United States Congress

Legislative history
- Introduced in the Senate as S. 1272 by Maria Cantwell (D–WA) and Chuck Grassley (R–IA) on April 3, 2025; Committee consideration by Senate Finance

The Trade Review Act of 2025 (S.1272) is a proposed bipartisan bill introduced in the 119th U.S. Congress to reassert Congressional authority over trade policy decisions, particularly the imposition of tariffs, in response to Trump’s announcement of new import taxes.

The legislation was prompted by concerns over the executive branch’s growing use of unilateral trade actions during Trump’s second term. The bill would require the President to notify Congress of any new tariffs, provide economic justifications, and obtain Congressional approval for those tariffs to remain in effect beyond 60 days.

The bill was introduced in the Senate by Maria Cantwell (D‑WA) and Chuck Grassley (R‑IA), with a companion measure in the House led by Don Bacon (R‑NE 2nd). The Act has received support from lawmakers across party lines but has faced strong opposition from the White House, including a veto threat from President Donald Trump.

== Background ==
Historically, the U.S. Constitution grants Congress the power to regulate commerce with foreign nations, as outlined in Article I, Section 8. However, over the course of the 20th and 21st centuries, Congress has delegated significant aspects of this authority to the executive branch, mostly through legislation that gave the President greater flexibility on international trade issues. The Trade Expansion Act and the Trade Act of 1974 provided the executive with broad powers to impose tariffs and other measures on national security grounds and in response to unfair trade practices.

== Provisions ==
The legislation establishes new requirements for executive action on the imposition of import duties in order to strengthen Congressional oversight of trade policy by amending the Trade Act of 1974.

- Notification Requirement: The President must notify Congress within 48 hours of imposing or increasing a duty on any imported article. This notification must include a detailed rationale for the action and an assessment of its potential impact on U.S. businesses and consumers.
- Congressional Approval: Any new or increased tariff will automatically expire after 60 days unless Congress enacts a joint resolution of approval allowing it to remain in effect.
- Termination Authority: Congress has the authority to terminate existing tariffs by passing a joint resolution of disapproval at any time after receiving the President's notification.

The bill explicitly excludes antidumping and countervailing duties imposed under Title VII of the Tariff Act of 1930 from these requirements.

== Legislative history ==
On April 3, 2025, Maria Cantwell (D‑WA) introduced the Trade Review Act of 2025 in the Senate. The bill was cosponsored by a bipartisan group of 7 senators, including Chuck Grassley (R‑IA), the President pro tempore of the Senate. On the following day, 6 additional senators cosponsored the legislation. Overall, the bill has 13 cosponsors, 7 Republicans and 6 Democrats.

In the House of Representatives, a companion bill was introduced by Representative Don Bacon (R‑NE 2nd), who argued for the necessity for Congress to reclaim its constitutionally mandated authority over trade matters.
