= McConnel =

McConnel may refer to:

- McConnel (surname)
- Electoral district of McConnel, an electoral district of Queensland, Australia
- Mount McConnel, a mountain of Larimer County, Colorado, United States
- McConnel Islands, islands of Graham Land, Antarctica

== See also ==
- McConnell (disambiguation)
