= Joshua Claybourn =

American attorney, author, and historian

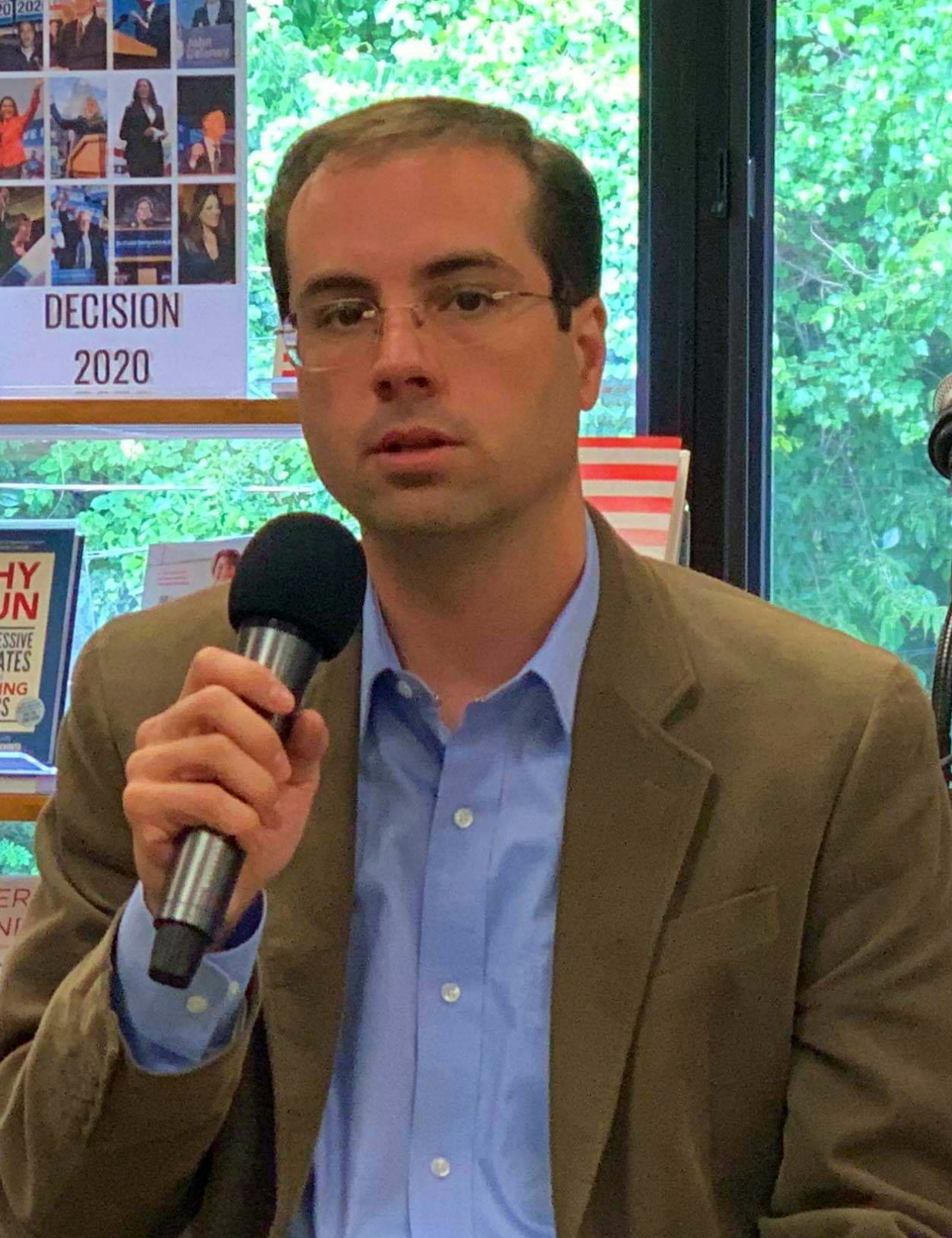
- Born: June 10, 1981 (age 44); Evansville, Indiana, U.S.
- Education: Indiana University (BS, JD)
- Occupations: Lawyer, historian
- Organization(s): Jackson Kelly, Cato Institute
- Board member of: Abraham Lincoln Association, Abraham Lincoln Institute
- Website: joshuaclaybourn.com

Joshua Claybourn (born June 10, 1981) is an American attorney, author, and historian. He is best known for his scholarship on Abraham Lincoln and is an adjunct scholar with the Cato Institute, a libertarian think tank.

== Career ==
=== Legal work ===
Claybourn is an attorney with the law firm of Jackson Kelly, where he represents governmental entities, public officials, businesses, and corporations. His legal work often focuses on constitutional law, separation of powers, intellectual property, and the limits of executive authority. In 2020, he co-authored an article in the Indiana Law Review with Abby DeMare advocating for greater legislative checks on executive emergency powers. Claybourn also served as co-counsel in a civil suit against the State of Indiana and Governor Eric Holcomb, alleging that certain executive orders issued during the COVID-19 pandemic exceeded the governor's constitutional authority. The case was ultimately dismissed as moot after Governor Holcomb rescinded the challenged orders, and the Indiana Court of Appeals later affirmed the dismissal.

In 2025, Claybourn organized and co-authored a high-profile amici curiae brief filed in V.O.S. Selections, Inc. v. Trump and Learning Resources v. Trump, federal lawsuits challenging President Donald Trump's tariff and import tax program. The brief brought together a coalition of constitutional scholars, former judges, and senior public officials from across the political spectrum. Signatories included Steven Calabresi, co-founder of the Federalist Society; constitutional scholars Michael McConnell and Richard Epstein; former Attorney General Michael Mukasey; former U.S. Senators George Allen, John Danforth, and Chuck Hagel; and prominent legal academics Harold Koh, Alan Sykes, and Gerard Magliocca. The "McConnell/Claybourn brief" emphasized that the endurance of the American Republic depends not only on democratic elections but also on the faithful preservation of the Constitution's structural limitations on executive power. Claybourn elaborated on these concerns in a Wall Street Journal op-ed, emphasizing the importance of maintaining the Constitution's structural limitations on executive authority. The brief proved influential in two district courts and an appellate court in overturning Trump's tariffs. The Supreme Court affirmed that the tariffs were illegal.

=== Historical scholarship ===
Claybourn is considered one of the foremost living scholars of Abraham Lincoln's youth in Indiana. He appeared as an expert in the six-part CNN documentary Lincoln: Divided We Stand. Claybourn is editor of Abraham Lincoln's Wilderness Years, a compilation of significant scholarship from J. Edward Murr covering Lincoln's youth. He is co-editor (with William Bartelt) of Abe’s Youth: Shaping the Future President, providing source material from the Indiana Lincoln Inquiry. Claybourn also served as a research assistant to Professor Gerard Magliocca during his work on Andrew Jackson and the Constitution: The Rise and Fall of Generational Regimes.

Claybourn edited Our American Story: The Search for a Shared National Narrative (Potomac Books, 2019), a collection of essays by theorists, historians, and politicians addressing the possibility of a shared narrative within a country divided by political polarization. Contributors to the project include Cass Sunstein, Gordon S. Wood, John Danforth, Richard Epstein, David Blight, Markos Moulitsas, Alan Taylor, Eleanor Clift, Jim Banks, Nikolas Gvosdev, Ilya Somin, Cherie Harder, Gerard Magliocca, Jason Kuznicki, Cody Delistraty, Spencer Boyer, Ali Wyne, and James Wertsch. Kirkus Reviews wrote that the book's "responses are all over the map, provocatively so" and called it a "mixed-bag collection".

=== Public engagement ===
Claybourn is an adjunct scholar with the Cato Institute, a libertarian think tank, where his work centers on constitutional structure, the separation of powers, and free trade. He frequently writes op-ed columns for prominent national publications including The New York Times and The Wall Street Journal, as well as regional newspapers and online outlets. His commentary often addresses political, legal, and social topics, including pieces on sports rivalries, taxation, and constitutional concerns. Additionally, his regular columns appear in regional outlets such as the Evansville Courier & Press and State Affairs Pro.

Claybourn, named one of the 250 most influential leaders in Indiana, often serves as a political advisor. He was cited as a "key supporter" of Congressman Larry Bucshon of Indiana's 8th congressional district and was a principal adviser to Evansville Mayor Lloyd Winnecke's campaign and was a part of Winnecke's 2012 transition team. In 2016, Claybourn was selected as an Indiana delegate to the 2016 Republican National Convention, but a day after Donald Trump's win in the Indiana primary which made Trump the party's presumptive nominee, Claybourn resigned his position in opposition to the nominee.

== Publications ==
- Claybourn, Joshua A., ed. Abraham Lincoln's Wilderness Years: Collected Works of J. Edward Murr. Bloomington: Indiana University Press, 2023.
- Claybourn, Joshua A., ed. Our American Story: The Search for a Shared National Narrative. Lincoln: Potomac Books, 2019.
- Bartelt, William, and Joshua A. Claybourn, eds. Abe’s Youth: Shaping the Future President. Bloomington: Indiana University Press, 2019.
- Claybourn, Joshua A., ed. Born of Clay: The Story of the Claiborne · Claybourn · Clayborn Families in the United States. Evansville: Claybourn Genealogical Society, 2016.
