= Bartelt =

Bartelt is a surname. Notable people with the surname include:

- Christian Bartelt (born 1976), German politician
- Gustavo Bartelt (born 1974), Argentine footballer
- William Bartelt (born 1946), American historian and author
- Andreas Bartelt (born 1962), Gastronomy Coaching
