= Learning Resources, Inc. v. Trump =

Learning Resources, Inc. v. Trump Trump v. V.O.S. Selections, Inc.
- Supreme Court of the United States

Argued November 5, 2025 Decided February 20, 2026
- Full case name: Learning Resources, Inc., et al. v. Donald J. Trump, et al. Donald J. Trump, et al., v. V.O.S. Selections, Inc.
- Docket nos.: 24-1287; 25-250
- Citations: 607 U.S. 229 (more)
- Argument: Oral argument
- Decision: Opinion

Questions presented
- 1. Whether the International Emergency Economic Powers Act (IEEPA), Pub. L. No. 95-223, Tit. II, 91 Stat. 1626, authorizes the tariffs imposed by President Trump pursuant to the national emergencies declared or continued in Proclamation 10886 and Executive Orders 14157, 14193, 14194, 14195, and 14257, as amended.; 2. If IEEPA authorizes the tariffs, whether the statute unconstitutionally delegates legislative authority to the President.

Holding
- IEEPA does not authorize the President to impose tariffs.

Court membership
- Chief Justice John Roberts Associate Justices Clarence Thomas · Samuel Alito; Sonia Sotomayor · Elena Kagan; Neil Gorsuch · Brett Kavanaugh; Amy Coney Barrett · Ketanji Brown Jackson

Case opinions
- Majority: Roberts (parts I, II–A–1, and II–B), joined by Sotomayor, Kagan, Gorsuch, Barrett, Jackson
- Plurality: Roberts (parts II–A–2 and III), joined by Gorsuch, Barrett
- Concurrence: Gorsuch
- Concurrence: Barrett
- Concurrence: Kagan (in part and in judgment), joined by Sotomayor, Jackson
- Concurrence: Jackson (in part and in judgment)
- Dissent: Thomas
- Dissent: Kavanaugh, joined by Thomas, Alito

Laws applied
- U.S. Const. art. I, International Emergency Economic Powers Act

Learning Resources, Inc. v. Trump, 607 U.S. 229 (2026), is a decision of the Supreme Court of the United States in which the Court held that the International Emergency Economic Powers Act (IEEPA), an economic sanctions law, does not authorize the president to unilaterally set tariffs. The ruling vacated many of the tariffs implemented during the second Trump administration.

In February 2025, President Donald Trump announced tariffs on imports from Canada and Mexico, and separately from China, citing the IEEPA as the statutory authority for doing so. After implementing other tariffs citing different statutory authorities, Trump announced the global Liberation Day tariffs also citing the IEEPA the following April. Multiple lawsuits from affected companies and U.S. states were filed shortly after this announcement, including both Learning Resources, Inc. v. Trump and Trump v. V.O.S. Selections, Inc., challenging the president's authority to issue tariffs under IEEPA.

In Learning Resources, the District Court for the District of Columbia ruled the tariffs were unconstitutional in May 2025. In Trump v. V.O.S. Selections, the United States Court of International Trade (CIT) ruled in May 2025 that the president does not have the authority to use the IEEPA to set tariffs in this way, and permanently enjoined the government from enforcing them. The CIT's ruling was upheld on appeal by the en banc Federal Circuit Appeals Court in August 2025. In both cases, the lower courts stayed their injunctions to allow Trump to appeal the rulings to the Supreme Court.

The Supreme Court granted both petitions in September and consolidated them into a single case. The Court expedited scheduling of oral arguments, which were heard on November 5, 2025. Court observers believed a majority of the justices expressed skepticism towards the government's rationale for the tariffs during the oral session. In its opinion of February 20, 2026, the Court decided that this matter is within the exclusive jurisdiction of the CIT, and ordered the dismissal of the Learning Resources case from the District of Columbia court. The Court affirmed the CIT ruling in V.O.S. Selections against the tariffs, though did not rule on the manner of tariff repayment. Since the decision, refunds have been issued by the United States Customs and Border Protection to those businesses that had paid IEEPA tariffs, while Trump has enacted other tariffs through limited routes previously passed into law by Congress, such as through the Trade Expansion Act and the Trade Act of 1974.

== Background ==
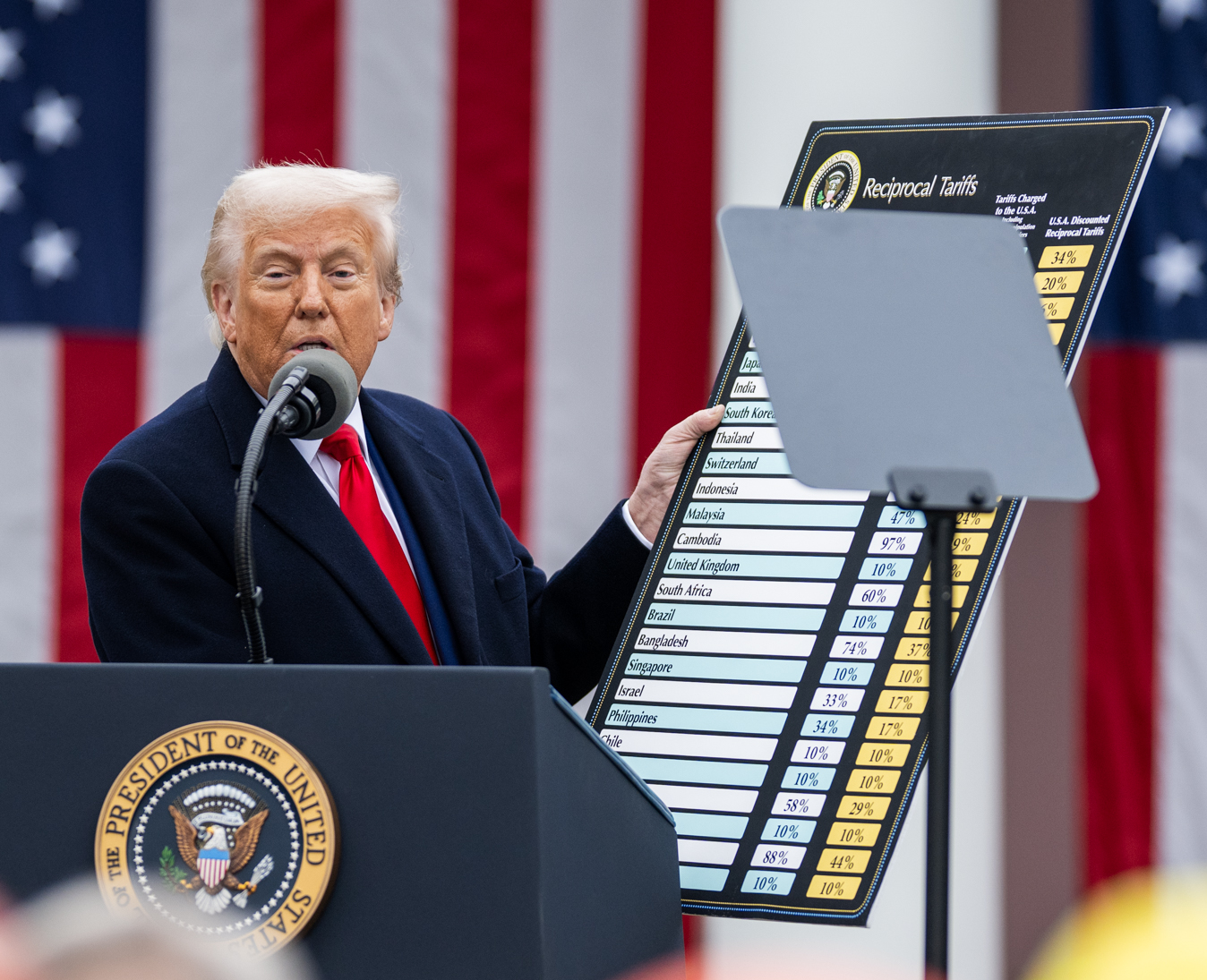
Trump displaying the chart detailing tariffs levied against the United States and retaliatory tariffs ("Liberation Day tariffs") that he would issue in return

During his 2024 presidential campaign, Donald Trump stated his intent to place heavy tariffs on China while applying tariffs to most other imports, asserting that these were needed to have countries improve their efforts to stop the entry of illegal drugs like fentanyl into the US, as well as to stem the flow of undocumented immigrants. Trump likened the need for tariffs to recreate the successes of the Gilded Age in the late 19th century under William McKinley.

Trump enacted executive orders 14193, 14194, and 14195 on February 2, 2025, for tariffs on Canada, Mexico, and China, respectively, citing his ability to do so under the International Emergency Economic Powers Act (IEEPA). On April 2, 2025, Trump announced further "Liberation Day" tariffs on many countries and products as part of Executive Order 14257 asserting his authority to do so under the IEEPA. Trump argued that there were numerous trade deficits that were unfair to the United States and threaten national security, and declared an economic emergency to justify the use of the IEEPA to correct them. Under the new tariff plan, nearly all incoming goods were set to a 10% tariff, with about sixty additional countries set at higher tariff rates. Further, Trump stated his intent to use "reciprocal tariffs" calculated based on countries' trade surpluses with the United States. Trump had pushed for tariffs alongside his "Big Beautiful Bill" passed by Congress in July 2025 which significantly cut government revenue from taxes but with more government spending, with the tariffs intended to make up the difference. The Trump administration has also said the tariffs would help deal with the $37 trillion federal debt, and allows a point of leverage in foreign relations. The tariffs did not come into effect until July 2025, during which the Trump administration secured trade agreements with some countries including Japan and the European Union, reducing the tariff rate applied in exchange for either investments into the US or importing more US goods.

The tariff plan was met with harsh criticism from multiple sectors. World leaders from multiple countries urged Trump to back off the tariff plan, with the European Union's president Ursula von der Leyen saying they would be a "major blow to the world economy". Economic experts also were critical of the tariff plan with concerns on the flawed calculations used to justify the tariff rates. Business lobbying groups including the United States Chamber of Commerce and the Business Roundtable sought relief from the Trump administration to lessen the impact of the tariffs on businesses. Small businesses were hardest hit by the tariffs; compared to large companies that had sufficient on-hand capital to stock up on imports prior to enforcement of the tariffs, many small businesses had little leeway to prepare, and many had to cut back on profit and plans for expansion due to the tariffs.

== Lower court history ==
Multiple lawsuits were filed in wake of Trump's Liberation Day tariff announcement, but the V.O.S. Selections was one of the first filed and had progressed the furthest. James Fanelli of The Wall Street Journal said "Other challenges have been filed in the court and in federal district courts around the country, but the V.O.S. case is front and center so far." In addition to Learning Resources and V.O.S. Selections, there were other similar lawsuits. In April 2025, twelve US states led by Oregon filed a similar suit in the Court of International Trade, arguing that Trump did not have the authority to use the IEEPA to set tariffs. The states' case was consolidated with that of the V.O.S. Selections' case.

These cases do not challenge another route for the president to set tariffs under Section 232 of the Trade Expansion Act, which allows the president to establish tariffs in the interest of national security. Trump has used this during his second administration to set tariffs on aluminum and steel imports, among other goods.

=== Learning Resources v. Trump ===
On April 22, 2025, Learning Resources and Hand2mind, two family-owned educational toy manufacturers, sued Trump in the United States District Court for the District of Columbia. In an interview with CBS News, Learning Resources' chief executive, Rick Woldenberg, argued that Trump's tariffs would negatively affect his business and the US economy, citing that their costs to tariffs had risen by a 44-fold increase.

A coalition of experts filed an amici curiae brief in support of the plaintiff for Learning Resources, in addition to a similar one for V.O.S. Selections, stating "The powers to tax, to regulate commerce, and to shape the nation's economic course must remain with Congress. They cannot drift silently into the hands of the President through inertia, inattention, or creative readings of statutes never meant to grant such authority. That conviction is not partisan. It is constitutional. And it strikes at the heart of this case." The brief, co-authored by Michael W. McConnell and Joshua Claybourn, brought together "big-name constitutional law scholars across the political spectrum" according to Reason, and included legal scholars Steven Calabresi, Harold Koh, Richard Epstein, Michael W. McConnell, and Gerard Magliocca, and former government officials Michael Mukasey, George Allen, and Chuck Hagel. The filing, dubbed the McConnell/Claybourn brief, was cited by Vox as one of the plaintiffs' two significant advantages, noting that co-signer John Danforth is a mentor to Justice Clarence Thomas and gave Thomas his first job out of law school. According to Adam Liptak of The New York Times, the amici brief was considered instrumental in the case's proceedings. McConnell would later transition to serve as counsel to the plaintiffs in V.O.S. Selections.

Judge Rudolph Contreras ruled on May 29, 2025, that Trump's tariffs were unlawful, but limited his order to the plaintiffs and delayed it until an appeal could be heard. Trump appealed to the D.C. Circuit Court of Appeals by June 3, leading judge Contreras to extend the stay on his order while the case was litigated there.

While the case progressed in the appeals court, Learning Resources filed for a motion to expedite directly to the Supreme Court, bypassing the appeals court, along with a writ of certiorari on June 18, 2025. The Supreme Court rejected the expedited request two days later without comment. In July, solicitor general D. John Sauer argued that the justices "should not leapfrog" the proceedings in the appeals court.

=== V.O.S. Selections, Inc. v. Trump ===
==== Court of International Trade ====
In V.O.S. Selections, the plaintiffs, consisting of five small businesses which were facing potential bankruptcy due to the tariffs, filed suit against the government on April 14, 2025, in the United States Court of International Trade (CIT), a judicial venue for civil actions related to the government's trade regulations. The businesses were represented by the Liberty Justice Center and Ilya Somin, a law professor at George Mason University. The plaintiffs argued that the administration had improperly used the IEEPA to impose tariffs that were not authorized by that law. Somin said that while the IEEPA had previously been used by other presidents in sanctions against other countries or to freeze assets of foreign terrorists, no previous president used the law to simply set tariff rate, and that Trump's imposition of the tariffs was "an enormous abuse of power, and it still needs to be stopped". Jeffrey Schwab, senior counsel at Liberty Justice Center said:

Our system is not set up so that one person in the system can have the power to impose taxes across the world economy. That’s not how our constitutional republic works...

The Court denied a motion for a temporary restraining order on April 25, 2025, but ordered the Trump administration to respond to the plaintiffs' motions for a preliminary injunction and summary judgment. The Court set a briefing schedule and hearing to rule on plaintiff's motion for a preliminary injunction to enjoin the implementation of the Liberation Day tariffs.

The three judge panel, consisting of judges Timothy Reif (a Trump appointment), Gary Katzmann (an Obama appointment), and Jane Restani (a Reagan appointee), heard the case on May 13, 2025. Plaintiffs were represented by Jeffrey M. Schwab of the Liberty Justice Center, while Eric J. Hamilton of the US Department of Justice defended the government's position.

The Trump administration argued that federal courts upheld use of the Trading with the Enemy Act of 1917, to which the IEEPA was an amendment, by the Nixon administration in response to the economic impact from the ending of the Bretton Woods system in August 1971.

The three-judge panel granted plaintiffs summary judgment on May 28, 2025, permanently enjoining the government from enforcing the tariffs. The court ruled that the IEEPA does not delegate power from Congress to the president to create tariffs in this way. The panel's opinion explained its ruling that while the president may at times of emergency be given limited powers within the statute to set tariffs, this does not grant the office the "unlimited tariff authority" that Trump had claimed the IEEPA granted, nor could the Congress delegate such unlimited power under the Constitution.

The opinion stated that Congress could only delegate tariff powers to the president if that delegation includes "an intelligible principle to which the person or body authorized to fix such [tariff] rates is directed to conform"; if the IEEPA was intended to give the president broad tariff powers, then the court would have found the IEEPA unconstitutional as it lacked any specific conditions and limitations for that delegation.

A second factor stated by the opinion is that the president's power to set tariffs to address trade deficits is circumscribed under the Trade Act of 1974, but only at a maximum rate of 15% and for a maximum of 150 days. A third point raised by the opinion countered the rationale given by Trump to fight the "unusual and extraordinary threat" of illegal drug trade into the US, and held that none of the tariffs issued by Trump did anything to stop drugs from entering the US, and rejected Trump's argument that other nations would be incentivized to stop drug trade to the US to remove the tariffs.

==== Federal Circuit Appeals Court ====
The Trump administration appealed to the Court of Appeals for the Federal Circuit and requested a stay of the permanent injunction. The circuit court granted the government's motion to stay, while also ordering an expedited en banc hearing on the substantive issues in the case on July 31, 2025, with additional briefings on the merits.

At the hearing on July 31, journalists observed that some of the judges seemed skeptical of the arguments advanced by the administration's lawyers. D. John Sauer, the Solicitor General, filed an additional submission with the court after the hearing, stating that if the tariffs were overturned, the result would be an economic depression on par with the 1929 depression, jeopardizing social programs such as Social Security and Medicare and requiring the federal government to repay trillions of dollars to foreign countries.

On August 29, the Federal Circuit Court of Appeals affirmed the summary judgment of the Court of International Trade in a per curiam opinion ruling that Trump had exceeded his authority under the IEEPA, that establishing tariffs was a power controlled only by Congress, and that the president's approach raised issues under the Supreme Court's major questions doctrine. In its reasons, the per curiam opinion stated that: "...the President has departed from the established tariff schedules and imposed varying tariffs of unlimited duration on imports of nearly all goods from nearly every country with which the United States conducts trade."

While a per curiam decision, four out of the eleven judges on the court joined in dissent, with judge Richard G. Taranto writing the dissenting opinion joined by chief judge Kimberly Moore and judges Sharon Prost and Raymond Chen. Taranto said "IEEPA embodies an eyes-open congressional grant of broad emergency authority in this foreign-affairs realm, which unsurprisingly extends beyond authorities available under non-emergency laws, and Congress confirmed the understood breadth by tying IEEPA’s authority to particularly demanding procedural requirements for keeping Congress informed."

The ruling invalidated the executive orders establishing the tariffs against Canada and Mexico as well as the Liberation Day tariffs, but did not involve tariffs on steel, copper, and aluminum that were placed under Section 232 of the Trade Expansion Act of 1962. The case was remanded to the Court of International Trade to determine remedies. The appeals court imposed a stay of execution through October 14 to allow the administration to appeal to the US Supreme Court. Trump argued on social media that the ruling, if allowed to stand, "would literally destroy the United States of America" and vowed to appeal to the Supreme Court to reverse.

== US Supreme Court ==
Within a week of the en banc Federal Circuit decision from V.O.S. Selections, the administration formally requested an expedited ruling from the Supreme Court. The Court accepted the case on September 9, 2025, consolidating it with the pending petition from Learning Resources. The case was later scheduled to be heard November 5, 2025. Ahead of the oral hearings, analysts said this case was one of the first major tests at the Supreme Court on the limits of Trump's claims of executive power during his second term; the court had previous issued orders from the emergency docket favorable to Trump, but the tariff case brings in issues related to the principles of non-delegation and the major questions doctrine which conservative justices have written in favor of in prior cases.

The small businesses challenging the tariffs said in their filings that the tariffs are unconstitutional as the word "tariff" does not appear at all in the IEEPA, nor does any other congressional statute that gives the executive the power to regulate importation the ability to impose taxes, in addition to addressing the major questions doctrine and non-delegation principles. The Trump administration argued in their filings that the language of IEEPA "plainly" gives the president the ability to set tariffs as a means of regulating imports. The administration also argued that, counter to the Federal Circuit court's finding, that tariff powers given to the president under IEEPA are not unlimited, with tariffs limited to a maximum of one year and overridable through Congress. Further, the administration argued that the major question doctrine should not apply to matters of foreign affairs and national security.

=== Amicus briefs ===
Merits briefs were filed by 44 groups of amici curiae: 37 in support of the challengers, 6 in support of the government, and 1 in support of neither. The case drew fewer amicus briefs than other recent high-profile cases—and most sided with the challengers rather than the government. Many of the briefs opposing the Trump administration came from conservative groups, an unusual state according to SCOTUSblog.

The Washington Post's George Will identified six amicus briefs that emphasized the separation-of-powers concerns and question whether IEEPA authorizes the President to impose broad revenue-raising tariffs without clear congressional direction. The Goldwater Institute argues whether an "emergency" exists under IEEPA is a justiciable question and that chronic trade imbalances and drug trafficking do not qualify as the kind of "sudden, unforeseen, extraordinary" emergencies that justify extraordinary powers; it also urges a clear statement rule for delegations of taxing power. The Brennan Center for Justice contends that IEEPA was crafted to provide only a "temporary boost" in crisis, not a backdoor to unreviewable, open-ended tariff authority; it maintains that if Congress can address a condition through ordinary legislation, the condition is not an "emergency." A coalition of economists asserts that, even assuming IEEPA permitted tariffs, such tariffs are unlikely to "deal with" trade deficits as the statute requires; over the last half-century, deficits have been common among many nations and the net effects of tariffs on trade balances are typically small.

Most of the same bipartisan group of legal scholars and former officials that had signed onto the McConnell/Claybourn brief used in the lower rulings, argued in their amicus brief that Congress never intended IEEPA to serve as a "backdoor" for executive taxation or large-scale economic restructuring, noting that the statute authorizes several specific actions but never mentions taxes or tariffs. The Institute for Policy Integrity (NYU School of Law) focuses on the major-questions doctrine, arguing the asserted IEEPA tariff power is “unheralded”, “transformative”, and of vast economic and political significance, and therefore cannot be inferred absent a clear statement from Congress. Cato Institute researchers dispute the administration’s policy justifications, noting that since IEEPA’s enactment in 1977 the United States has negotiated numerous trade agreements without resort to IEEPA-based tariffs and that claimed diplomatic necessity does not supply missing statutory authority.

=== Oral hearings ===
Michael W. McConnell and Neal Katyal represented the businesses in V.O.S. Selections, Pratik Shah represented those in Learning Resources, Katyal delivered the oral argument for all of the private businesses, and Oregon Solicitor General Ben Gutman argued for the US state parties. Sauer presented the US government's case.

Trump had previously stated that he may attend the oral arguments, which would make him the first incumbent president to ever attend oral arguments before the Supreme Court, but in the days ahead, said he would not attend, stating "I just don't want to do anything to deflect the importance of that decision. It's not about me, it's about our country."

Journalists hearing the oral arguments said it appeared likely that the tariffs would be ruled unconstitutional, with both conservative and liberal justices questioning whether IEEPA allowed for the president to set tariffs. Both Neil Gorsuch and Amy Coney Barrett raised questions on the non-delegation principle, with Gorsuch saying it would be a "one way ratchet" of Congressional power to the president if the tariffs were upheld. Both Samuel Alito and Clarence Thomas had said that the Court may be treading on presidential power by overruling his tariffs.

=== Decision ===
The Supreme Court released its decision on February 20, 2026. The majority opinion, written by Chief Justice John Roberts, and joined by Justices Sonia Sotomayor, Elena Kagan, Neil Gorsuch, Amy Coney Barrett and Ketanji Brown Jackson, stated that the IEEPA does not give the president the power to set tariffs. In the case of Learning Resources, the D.C. District Court's decision was vacated and remanded to be closed due to a lack of jurisdiction, while for V.O.S. Selections, the lower court decision was upheld. The ruling, one of the few issued by the Supreme Court to date to rule against Trump's presidency, was considered a landmark decision by multiple media outlets.

==== Majority opinion and concurrences ====
Roberts' opinion, joined by the five other justices, found that the IEEPA's language did not give tariff power to the president. Roberts wrote "Based on two words separated by 16 others in […] IEEPA—'regulate' and 'importation'—the President asserts the independent power to impose tariffs on imports from any country, of any product, at any rate, for any amount of time. Those words cannot bear such weight.[…] IEEPA contains no reference to tariffs or duties." Moreover, “until now no President has read IEEPA to confer such power." Roberts stated the imposed tariffs were not supported by the language of the IEEPA. Roberts wrote "the president asserts the extraordinary power to unilaterally impose tariffs of unlimited amount, duration and scope", the government "points to no statute" where Congress expressly said IEEPA could apply to tariffs. Roberts further reasoned that, were "regulate" interpreted to include taxation, that interpretation "would render IEEPA partly unconstitutional", as the law also allows the president to regulate "exportation", where the taxation of exports is unconstitutional per the Export Clause.

A plurality of Roberts, Gorsuch, and Barrett agreed that the tariffs under IEEPA failed the major questions doctrine. Roberts wrote "When Congress has delegated its tariff powers, it has done so in explicit terms, and subject to strict limits." Gorsuch, in his concurring opinion, further criticized Congress for letting Trump dictate tariffs, rather than legislatively enacting them, and emphasized the need for the non-delegation doctrine. Kagan, joined by Sotomayor and Jackson, disagreed that the major questions doctrine was needed to invalidate the tariffs, only ordinary reading of the IEEPA language. Kagan stated that by asserting the major questions doctrine, the plurality was putting its "thumb on the scale" to reach the same result.

==== Dissents ====
Justices Clarence Thomas and Brett Kavanaugh wrote separate dissents, with Thomas and Samuel Alito also joining Kavanaugh's dissent. Thomas stated that Trump's tariffs were valid under historical application of tariff power. Kavanaugh's lengthy dissent stated that tariffs "are a traditional and common tool to regulate importation" and that because there were numerous other ways that the president could set tariffs by federal statute, those other routes "might justify most (if not all) of the tariffs at issue in this case", outlining several of those routes in his dissent. Kavanaugh also asserted that the tariffs had aided Trump's foreign policy as they "helped facilitate trade deals worth trillions of dollars — including with foreign nations from China to the United Kingdom to Japan, and more."

The decision only addressed the legality of tariffs collected via IEEPA sanctions and did not address how the tariffs already collected should be repaid, though Kavanaugh warned in his dissent that repayment could have a significant impact on the US treasury.

== Aftermath ==
=== Tariff repayments ===
The impact of ruling against the tariffs might threaten the basis of the trade deals made with other countries, and there could be extensive litigation from companies seeking recovery of the tariffs they had paid the government since the onset of the tariffs. At least one scholar noted in Lawfare that "[c]ourts have long recognized that when duties or tariffs are later invalidated, the government cannot lawfully retain those amounts." The Congressional Research Service reported that the Treasury Department would be required to pay back unliquidated duties from the IEEPA tariffs, while liquidated duty would require legal actions to recover. The Secretary of the Treasury Scott Bessent has previously testified to Congress in September 2025 that invalidation of tariffs would require refunds, though in wake of the decision, implied that if tariffs were to be refunded, it would be up the lower courts on remand and not the Treasury to decide how they would be paid. Bloomberg News reported that by the end of February 2026, over 2000 lawsuits had been filed by many companies prior and after the decision to recover the tariffs that were collected. In some cases, customers of these companies, like Costco and FedEx, filed lawsuits against these companies to recover the additional costs placed on goods and services due to the costs of tariffs.

Following the ruling, the government ceased assessing and collecting importer deposits of IEEPA tariffs as of February 24, 2026. The Federal Circuit Court of Appeals denied the Trump administration's efforts to delay litigation and repayment in the CIT for the V.O.S. Selections plaintiffs on March 2, 2026. Judge Richard K. Eaton of the CIT ruled in a separate case on March 4, 2026, that all importers that paid tariffs under IEEPA were due refunds including interest from U.S. Customs and Border Patrol (CBP), and would be ruling on all further actions related to these refunds. Generally, importers pay estimated tariffs at the time of import, but in a regular process known as "liquidation" that generally takes about 314 days, the final tax bill is calculated and refunds or other adjustments are made in the ordinary course after importation. Eaton said that the government is expert in doing this and issues refunds regularly. The CBP said on March 6, 2026, that they were unable to comply with the order to immediately refund tariffs, identifying that issuing refunds for $166 billion of tariffs under IEEPA that had been collected from over 330,000 different importers would take millions of man-hours to complete, and instead they were working on a new computerized process that would be ready in late April to automate most of the refund work.

The CBP completed testing of the automated tariff refund system, the Consolidated Administration and Processing of Entries (CAPE) and opened the system on April 20, 2026. CAPE will group all tariffs refunds and interest into a single payment to each importer, with payments to be distributed in phases. By July 2026, the government had paid back $81 billion in tariff refunds.

=== Political responses ===
The court's ruling brought in mixed reactions across the political spectrum. Democratic politicians supported the ruling, including Elizabeth Warren and Chuck Schumer. Republican politicians including Mike Pence, Rand Paul, and Mitch McConnell praised the ruling. House Speaker Mike Johnson gave a mixed reaction, while Bernie Moreno criticized the ruling and called on Congress to "codify the tariffs". Treasury Secretary Scott Bessent called the decision "unfortunate", while Governor Sarah Huckabee Sanders called the majority ruling "wrong" and praised Thomas's dissent. Canadian businessman Kevin O’Leary said the Court’s ruling created a "nightmare" for businesses, citing uncertainty about compliance obligations and the handling of tariff refunds. International reactions to the ruling were broadly positive, including from politicians from France, Germany, and China.

=== Alternate tariffs ===
Prior to the ruling, the Trump administration had said that if the IEEPA route is struck down by the Supreme Court, they will implement tariffs through other methods that are explicitly granted to the president via congressional acts. One route includes Section 232 of the Trade Expansion Act, which allows the president to set tariffs on imports of specific goods in the matter of national security (which Trump had already used in his second term for steel and aluminum imports), while another is through Section 301 of the Trade Act of 1974, which allows tariffs to be applied if the rights of the US are being impacted by a foreign power in an existing trade pact. Both require the Commerce Department to make an assessment of the need for the tariffs before they can be applied, and have shorter allowed durations compared to the actions the administration had claimed were allowed under IEEPA.

Trump complained about the ruling, calling out the three conservative justices that were part of the majority (Roberts, Gorsuch, and Barrett) as "disloyal, unpatriotic", and claimed they were RINOs, while praising Kavanaugh, Alito, and Thomas, thanking them "for their strength and wisdom and love of our country". By the day after the Supreme Court ruling, Trump had promised to set new global tariffs under Section 122 of the Trade Act of 1974 to the maximum 15% allowed, after initially calling for a 10% tariff hours after the ruling. Section 122 allows for the president to set such universal tariffs, limited to 150 days and require congressional approval for extension, to deal with serious balance-of-payments deficits, as had occurred under the Nixon shock. In most cases, 15% tariffs would be a significant reduction of the tariffs placed by those placed under IEEPA, particularly with Canada, Mexico, China, and most European Union countries. These tariffs first came into effect on February 24 at a rate of 10%, though Bessett said that they would likely increase to 15% in March and expected tariffs to return to IEEPA levels using other tariff routes later in 2026.

Multiple legal and economic experts, including Andrew McCarthy, a conservative legal commentator and Ilya Somin a law professor and one of the lawyers in V.O.S. Selections argue that these Trade Act tariffs are also illegal because the balance-of-payments deficit required by Section 122 does not exist, in part because the U.S. exports services over goods, nor does the U.S. adhere to the gold standard since the passage of the Trade Act. Twenty-four states, many who were part of the IEEPA tariff case, filed a lawsuit challenging the Section 122 tariffs in March 2026, arguing the conditions for Section 122 do not apply. A separate suit was filed by small businesses, arguing the same. The CIT issued a 2-1 decision on the small businesses' case on May 7, 2026, that the new tariffs were not justified under Section 122 and placed an injunction on the government from collecting those tariffs, though limited to the plaintiffs in the case. The U.S. Court of Appeals for the Federal Circuit issued a stay on that injunction in June 2026, though did not rule on the merits of the case.

By March 12, the administration announced the start of required investigations on China, Mexico, EU, and several southeastern Asian countries to establish the basis for tariffs under Section 301. Two separate reports were issued; one, the annual Special 301 Report identifying countries with intellectual property laws that may impact trade barriers, was issued in April 2026, while a second in June 2026 identified 60 countries (including the EU as a whole) that were claimed to used forced labor in products exported to the U.S. With the Section 122 tariffs expiring on July 24, 2026, Trump announced Section 301 tariffs the day before, ranging from 10% to 12.5% on the 60 countries identified in the forced labor report, which was estimated to impact 99.4% of U.S. trade. An addition 16 countries are expected to have Section 301 tariffs over excess manufacturing capacity. In addition to these, Trump had set a separate 25% tariff on multiple Brazilian imports under Section 301 under claims of unfair online content moderation among other factors, and used Section 338 of the Tariff Act of 1930 to set 50% tariffs on Canadian goods. The new Section 301 tariffs were challenged the same day they were enacted by two small businesses, arguing that the statute behind Section 301 was not intended to be used the way Trump used now and instead were replicating the Liberation Day tariff scheme.

The Supreme Court decision, while not directly addressing it, also appeared to invalidate the national emergency rationale that Trump had used to eliminate the de minimis exemption for imports valued under $800 in May and July 2025, claiming this exemption allowed fentanyl and other drugs to readily flow into the country. This change primarily affected Chinese importers like Temu and Shein. Trump issued a second executive order on the day of the Learning Resources decision reiterating that the de minimis exemption is closed indefinitely. The U.S. Court of Appeals for the Federal Circuit stayed the injunction, though did not rule in the merits of the case, in a June 2026 order. The CIT ruled in August 2026 that Trump did have authority to end the exemptions, allowing these goods to be tariffed.
