= Michael W. McConnell =

American judge (born 1955)

Michael McConnell
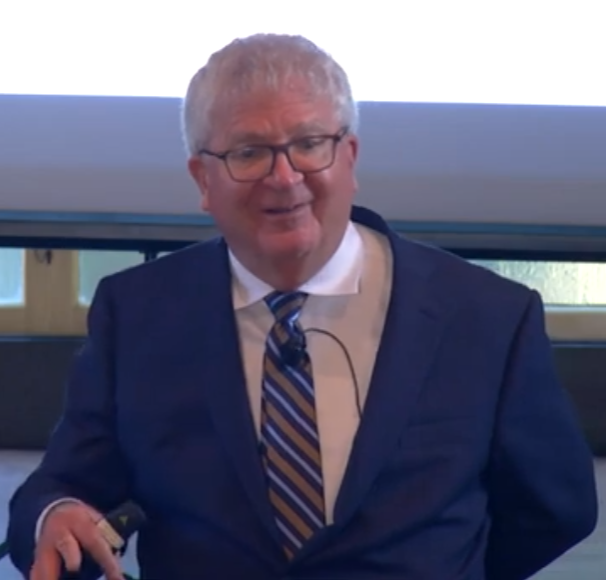

Judge of the United States Court of Appeals for the Tenth Circuit
- In office November 26, 2002 – August 31, 2009
- Nominated by: George W. Bush
- Preceded by: Stephen H. Anderson
- Succeeded by: Scott Matheson Jr.

Personal details
- Born: Michael William McConnell; May 18, 1955 (age 71) Louisville, Kentucky, U.S.
- Education: Michigan State University (BA); University of Chicago (JD)

Michael William McConnell (born May 18, 1955) is an American jurist and legal scholar who served as a United States circuit judge of the U.S. Court of Appeals for the Tenth Circuit from 2002 to 2009. Since 2009, McConnell has been a professor and Director of the Stanford Constitutional Law Center at Stanford Law School. He is also a senior fellow at Stanford University's Hoover Institution, and Senior Of Counsel to the Litigation Practice Group at Wilson Sonsini Goodrich & Rosati. In May 2020, Facebook appointed him to its content oversight board. In 2020, McConnell published The President Who Would Not Be King: Executive Power under the Constitution.

== Biography ==
McConnell graduated from Michigan State University's James Madison College with a Bachelor of Arts degree in 1976. He received his J.D. degree from the University of Chicago Law School in 1979, where he was an editor of the University of Chicago Law Review.

After law school, McConnell was a law clerk to Judge J. Skelly Wright of the U.S. Court of Appeals for the District of Columbia Circuit from 1979 to 1980 and to U.S. Supreme Court justice William J. Brennan Jr., from 1980 to 1981. He was an assistant general counsel at the Office of Management and Budget from 1981 to 1983 and an assistant to the Solicitor General from 1983 to 1985. From 1985 to 1996 McConnell was a professor at the University of Chicago Law School, where he brought Barack Obama on a fellowship after being impressed with a suggestion Obama, the Harvard Law Review president, had made about one of McConnell's articles. He has been a professor at the University of Utah S.J. Quinney College of Law and a visiting professor at Harvard Law School and the New York University School of Law.

== Scholarship ==
As a law professor, McConnell has published a variety of legal articles and edited several books. As a lawyer, he has argued cases in federal courts of appeals and before the Supreme Court, including a 5–4 victory in Rosenberger v. University of Virginia. He is widely regarded as one of the preeminent constitutional law scholars on the Free Exercise and Establishment Clauses.

In 1996, McConnell signed a statement supporting a constitutional amendment to ban abortion, which read, "Abortion kills 1.5 million innocent human beings in America every year. ... We believe that the abortion license is a critical factor in America's virtue deficit."

As a respected constitutional scholar during his law school tenure, McConnell contended that originalism is consistent with the Supreme Court's 1954 desegregation decision Brown v. Board of Education, as opposed to critics of originalism who argue that they are inconsistent. He has likewise argued that the Court's decision in Bolling v. Sharpe was correct but should have been reached on other grounds, as Congress never "required that the schools of the District of Columbia be segregated."

McConnell was critical of the Supreme Court's decision in Bush v. Gore:

I imagine that Gov. Bush and his supporters will put on a brave face and defend this decision, but I cannot imagine that there is much joy in Austin tonight. The Supreme Court, with all the prestige of its position in American public life, could have brought closure to this matter. But instead, by straddling the fence, the court has produced a combination of holdings that can please no one.

McConnell expressed skepticism on First Amendment grounds about restrictions on religious exercise imposed during the COVID-19 pandemic.

In 2021, McConnell's argument that Trump could be tried by the Senate after he left office because the second impeachment occurred while he was in office was frequently cited in Senate debates and in the media.

In 2025, McConnell co-authored, with Joshua Claybourn, a high-profile amici curiae brief filed in V.O.S. Selections, Inc. v. Trump, a federal lawsuit challenging President Donald Trump's tariff and import tax program. The brief brought together a prominent coalition "rarely seen" consistenting of leading constitutional scholars, former judges, and senior public officials from across the political spectrum. Signatories included Steven Calabresi, co-founder of the Federalist Society; constitutional scholar Richard Epstein; former Attorney General Michael Mukasey; former U.S. Senators George Allen, John Danforth, and Chuck Hagel; prominent legal academics Harold Koh, Alan Sykes, and Gerard Magliocca; and attorney Joshua Claybourn. The brief emphasized that the endurance of the American Republic depends not only on democratic elections but also on the faithful preservation of the Constitution's structural limitations on executive power. The brief proved influential in two district courts overturning Trump's tariffs. McConnell elaborated on his efforts and the legal issues involved in a New York Times op-ed, emphasizing the importance of maintaining the Constitution's structural limitations on executive authority.

== Federal judicial service ==
On September 4, 2001, President George W. Bush nominated McConnell to the United States Court of Appeals for the Tenth Circuit. The United States Senate confirmed him unanimously on November 15, 2002, by voice vote. He received his commission on November 26, 2002. He resigned from the bench on August 31, 2009.

=== Notable cases ===
While on the Tenth Circuit, McConnell wrote several judicial opinions. The Supreme Court reviewed four cases in which McConnell wrote an opinion; in each case, the Court reached the same result as McConnell. First, in Gonzales v. O Centro Espirita Beneficente Uniao do Vegetal (2006), a case involving the religious use of a hallucinogenic tea, the Supreme Court affirmed 8–0 a Tenth Circuit en banc decision to which Judge McConnell wrote a concurring opinion. Second, in Fernandez-Vargas v. Gonzales (2008), a case involving the retroactive application of a statutory provision limiting appeals from immigration removal orders, the Supreme Court affirmed 8–1 a Tenth Circuit panel decision written by Judge McConnell. Third, in Begay v. United States (2008), a case about whether a felony conviction for driving under the influence is a crime of violence for purposes of the Armed Career Criminal Act, the Supreme Court reversed 6–3 a Tenth Circuit panel decision from which McConnell dissented. Fourth, in Pleasant Grove City v. Summum (2009), a case involving whether the presence of a Ten Commandments monument on government property gave another religion a First Amendment right to place its own monument on the same property, the Supreme Court unanimously reversed a Tenth Circuit panel decision that McConnell had challenged by writing a dissent from the denial of rehearing en banc.

Significant opinions by McConnell include:

- Christian Heritage Academy v. Oklahoma Secondary School Activities Association, 483 F.3d 1025, 1037 (2007) (concurring and dissenting). Equal Protection Clause.
- United States v. Pruitt (2007) (concurring). Criminal sentencing.
- United States v. Allen (2007). Criminal sentencing. The case was covered by How Appealing and Decision of the Day.
- United States v. Medley (2007) (concurring). Criminal sentencing.
- Shrum v. City of Coweta, Oklahoma, 449 F.3d 1132 (2007). Free Exercise Clause.
- O Centro Espirita Beneficiente Uniao do Vegetal v. Ashcroft, 389 F.3d 973 (2004) (en banc) (McConnell, J., concurring), affirmed by Gonzales v. O Centro Espirita Beneficente Uniao do Vegetal, 546 U.S. 418 (2006). Free Exercise Clause; Religious Freedom Restoration Act.
- Geddes v. United Staffing Alliance Employee Medical Plan (2006).
- United States v. Patton (2006). Commerce Clause. Writing for the court, McConnell upheld a federal statute prohibiting the possession of body armor by felons. Even though the statute, as applied to Patton's intrastate and noncommercial possession of body armor, could not be sustained under any of the three Lopez categories the Supreme Court established, it fell within the Commerce Clause under another line of Supreme Court precedent (Scarborough) and noted the tension between the two sets of precedents. The court also rejected Patton's due process and necessity claims. The case was covered by Decision of the Day and The Volokh Conspiracy and was the subject of a constitutional law final exam at Cornell.
- Equal Employment Opportunity Commission v. BCI Coca-Cola.
- Southern Utah Wilderness Alliance v. Bureau of Land Management (2006).

== Supreme Court speculation ==
McConnell was mentioned as a potential nominee to the Supreme Court during the Bush administration. In June 2005, amid expectations that Chief Justice William H. Rehnquist would retire at the end of the Court's term, some sources cited McConnell as a frontrunner for Rehnquist's seat, which ultimately went to John Roberts. Professor Stephen B. Presser of Northwestern University School of Law argued that McConnell was "high on the White House's short list" because:

[McConnell] does believe that the Supreme Court has gone too far in reading the total separation of church and state into the Constitution, and because he ... understands that Roe v. Wade has no firm constitutional foundation. He might be acceptable to the left not only because so many liberal professors support him, but also because he has been public in his criticism of Bush v. Gore and the impeachment of President Clinton.

McConnell was also mentioned as a possible Supreme Court nominee in a John McCain or Mitt Romney presidency.

== Testimony on constitutional term limits for Supreme Court justices ==
On June 30, 2021, McConnell provided testimony to the Presidential Commission on the Supreme Court of the United States on the dangers of increasing the Court's size. He proposed a constitutional amendment to address such dangers, including an 18-year term limit on justices and appointment of a justice in each odd year, unless the Senate voted against the appointment.

Highlights of his testimony include:

Any attempt to increase the size of the Court would be widely, and correctly, be regarded as a partisan interference with the independence of the Court.... It is no exaggeration to say that this would destroy one of the central features of our constitutional system, the independent judiciary.

This [McConnell’s] proposal, if adopted, would have several salutary effects. It would make the power of the president to name Supreme Court justices regular, fair, and consistent, and thus likely would lower the political stakes of each nomination. The political balance of the Court would reflect the opinions of the people over time as expressed in their choice of presidents and senators, rather than the happenstance of health or accident or the strategic timing of the justices.

== See also ==
- George W. Bush Supreme Court candidates
- Bibliography of the United States Constitution

Legal offices
Preceded by Stephen H. Anderson	Judge of the United States Court of Appeals for the Tenth Circuit; 2002–2009	Succeeded by Scott Matheson Jr.
