= McConnell House =

McConnell House can refer to:

== United States ==
(sorted by state, then city/town)

- Edward Taylor McConnell House, Clarksville, Arkansas, listed on the National Register of Historic Places (NRHP) in Johnson County
- W.J. McConnell House, Moscow, Idaho, listed on the NRHP in Latah County
- Jackson-McConnell House, Junction City, Kansas, listed on the NRHP in Geary County
- James McConnell House, Lexington, Kentucky, listed on the NRHP in Fayette County
- William McConnell House, Lexington, Kentucky, listed on the NRHP in Fayette County
- McConnell-Woodson-Philips House, Nicholasville, Kentucky, listed on the NRHP in Jessamine County
- McConnell House, Law Office, and Slave Quarters, Wurtland, Kentucky, listed on the NRHP in Greenup County
- Clark-McConnell House, Grants Pass, Oregon, listed on the NRHP in Josephine County
- McConnell House (McConnellsburg, Pennsylvania), listed on the NRHP in Fulton County
- Chancellor T.M. McConnell House, Chattanooga, Tennessee, listed on the NRHP in Hamilton County
- John McConnell House, Maryville, Tennessee, listed on the NRHP in Blount County
- McConnell-Neve House, Charlottesville, Virginia, listed on the NRHP in Charlottesville
