= McConnel (surname) =

McConnel is a surname. Notable people with the surname include:

- Douglas McConnel (1893–1961), British Army officer
- John McConnel (1806–1899), Australian pastoralist and politician
- Mary McConnel (pioneer) (1824–1910), Scottish settler and hospital administrator
- May Jordan McConnel (1860–1929), Australian trade unionist and suffragist
- Michael McConnell (born 1942), one half of the American first same-sex couple to be married legally with a license that was never revoked
- Ursula McConnel (1888–1957), Australian anthropologist and ethnographer
- William McConnel (1809–1902), English industrialist

== See also ==
- McConnell (surname)
