= Stephen H. Anderson =

American judge (born 1932)

Stephen Anderson
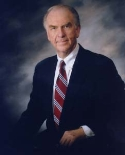

Senior Judge of the United States Court of Appeals for the Tenth Circuit
- Incumbent
- Assumed office January 1, 2000

Judge of the United States Court of Appeals for the Tenth Circuit
- In office October 16, 1985 – January 1, 2000
- Appointed by: Ronald Reagan
- Preceded by: Seat established
- Succeeded by: Michael W. McConnell

Personal details
- Born: Stephen Hale Anderson; January 12, 1932 (age 94) Salt Lake City, Utah, U.S.
- Education: Eastern Oregon University; Brigham Young University; University of Utah (LLB)

Stephen Hale Anderson (born January 12, 1932) is an inactive Senior United States circuit judge of the United States Court of Appeals for the Tenth Circuit.

== Early life and education ==
Anderson was born in Salt Lake City, Utah on January 12, 1932. His parents were Byron and Nan Anderson. In 1949, Anderson attended Eastern Oregon College of Education in LaGrande, Oregon where he studied until 1951. From 1951 to 1953 he served a mission to England for the Church of Jesus Christ of Latter-day Saints. From 1953 to 1955 he served in the United States Army. Anderson resumed his college career at Brigham Young University in 1955. He continued to study there until 1956. In 1957, he enrolled at the University of Utah College of Law where he graduated with his Bachelor of Laws in 1960. While in law school, he was also a member of Phi Kappa Phi, graduated Order of the Coif, and served as editor-in-chief of the Utah Law Review.

== Military service ==
From 1953 to 1955, in between his enrollment at Eastern Oregon College of Education and Brigham Young University, Anderson served on active duty in the United States Army 44th Infantry Division.

== Legal career ==
In 1960, after graduating from college, Anderson began his legal career as a trial attorney in the Tax Division of the United States Department of Justice in Washington, D.C. Four years later, he joined the law firm of Ray, Quinney & Nebeker in Salt Lake City, Utah concentrating in business and tax law and related litigation. He remained a private practice attorney until 1985. Anderson was President of the Utah State Bar (1983–1984), and President of the Salt Lake County Bar Association (1977–1978), and was on the governing boards of those organizations from 1972 to 1985. He was a founder of the Volunteer Lawyer Night Small Claims Court program, which won the American Bar Association's individual project Award of Merit, and was a founder of the Utah State Bar Law and Justice Center. Anderson was named Judge of the Year by the Federal Bar Association in 2005 and by the Utah State Bar in 2002; he was named Alumnus of the Year by the University of Utah College of Law in 1986. Anderson served as President of the Board of Trustees of the S.J. Quinney College of Law at the University of Utah (1982–1983), member of the Board of Visitors of the J. Reuben Clark Law School at Brigham Young University, and member of the Board of Governors of the Salt Lake Area Chamber of Commerce (Executive Committee, 1984–1985). While in private practice, he also served on the Board of Directors of ZCMI, the Amalgamated Sugar Company, and many other corporations.

== Judicial career ==
On July 23, 1985, Anderson was nominated by President Ronald Reagan to a new seat on the United States Court of Appeals for the Tenth Circuit created by 98 Stat. 333. He was confirmed by the United States Senate on October 16, 1985, and received his commission the same day. He was appointed by Chief Justice Rehnquist to the National Council of State and Federal Courts (1993–1998), and Chairman of the U.S. Judicial Conference Committee on Federal-State Jurisdiction (1995–1998). During his tenure, he testified in front of the United States Congress many times concerning related courts legislation. He assumed senior status on January 1, 2000. He maintained a full load of cases until January, 2015 when he assumed inactive senior status. He remains a member of the court.

== Selected opinions ==
=== Umbehr v. McClure, 44 F.3d 876 (10th Cir. 1995) ===
Keen Umbehr was an independent contractor working for Wabaunsee County, Kansas hauling away trash for six of the county's seven cities. In 1991, after he spoke out unfavorably against county policies, he lost his contracts with the county by a majority of 2 to 1. Claiming a violation of his First Amendment rights, Umbehr filed suit against the two majority members of the County Board.

Anderson and the Tenth Circuit ruled that "an independent contractor is protected under the First Amendment from retaliatory governmental action, just as an employee would be"; they thus reversed and remanded the District Court's 1993 ruling in favor of the county's motion for a summary judgement. In an opinion delivered by Justice O'Connor, the Supreme Court of the United States subsequently upheld the ruling after reviewing the case on a writ of certiorari.

=== Horstkoetter v. Department of Public Safety, 159 F.3d 1265 (10th Cir. 1998) ===
The wives of two officers with the Department of Public Safety placed political campaign signs at their personal residences. Department officials ordered the troopers to remove the sign pursuant to a departmental policy prohibiting members of the Highway Patrol from displaying partisan political signs at their residences. The troopers and their wives sued, contending that the policy violated their First Amendment rights to free expression. Writing for the court, Anderson held that the Department's prohibition on political signs did not violate the troopers' rights, but that the prohibition could not apply to their wives if they shared an ownership interest in the property.

=== United States v. Galloway, 56 F.3d 1239 (10th Cir. 1995) ===
Writing for the court, Judge Anderson said, "We granted en banc review in this case in part to review procedures in this circuit for asserting constitutionally ineffective assistance of counsel claims. In this context we must decide whether an ineffectiveness claim supported by new grounds is procedurally barred in a petitioner's first collateral proceeding under 28 U.S.C. § 2255, when the issue of ineffectiveness has already been raised and adjudicated on direct appeal. The panel opinion in this case so held. United States v. Galloway,32 F.3d 499, 503 (10th Cir.1994) (Galloway III)... [W]e conclude otherwise."

The court held "that an ineffective assistance of counsel claim on direct appeal does not bar the assertion of a subsequent ineffectiveness claim, based on different grounds, in a first petition filed pursuant to 28 U.S.C. § 2255."

The Circuit vacated the District Court's dismissal of habeas corpus and remanded it to the District Court for further proceedings.

=== Price v. Western Resources, 232 F.3d 779 (10th Cir. 2000) ===
In November 1997, an explosion at a Lawrence, Kansas power plant left an electrician, Charles Edward Price, and two other men dead from severe burns. Price's family filed a complaint against Westar Energy (then named Western Resources) seeking unspecified damages for personal injury and wrongful death.

Judge Anderson upheld a lower court's ruling in Price v. Western Resources that said Kansas law permitted families to only collect benefits through the workers' compensation system, and not through the courts.

"It cannot be said that (the Kansas law) is an arbitrary or irrational legislative action. On the contrary, it appears to be the result of a well thought-out compromise between the interests of employers and workers," Anderson wrote.

== Sources ==
Legal offices
New seat	Judge of the United States Court of Appeals for the Tenth Circuit; 1985–2000	Succeeded by Michael W. McConnell
