= William Bartelt =

American historian and author (born 1946)

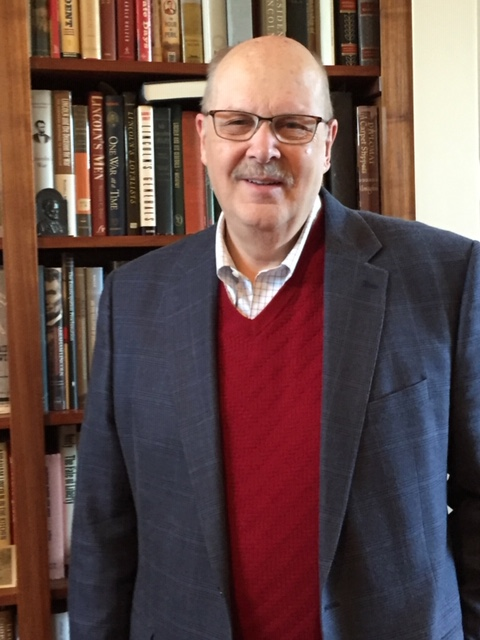
- Born: March 9, 1946 (age 80)
- Education: Indiana State University (B.S.); University of Evansville (M.S.)
- Occupations: Author and educator
- Known for: scholar of Abraham Lincoln
- Board member of: Abraham Lincoln Association, Indiana Historical Society

William Bartelt, often referred to as Bill Bartelt, is an American historian and author based in Newburgh, Indiana. He is considered the greatest living scholar on Abraham Lincoln's youth in Indiana.

== Early life and education ==
Bartelt graduated from Holland High School and received a Bachelor of Science in history education from Indiana State University and a master's degree from the University of Evansville. He worked more than fifteen summers at the Living Historical Farm at Lincoln Boyhood National Memorial in Lincoln City, Indiana. He also worked at the Lincoln Home National Historic Site in Springfield, Illinois.

== Career ==
Bartelt has published books, articles, and numerous historical reports on Lincoln's life, including a 2008 book titled There I Grew Up: Remembering Abraham Lincoln's Indiana Youth. In the book Bartelt guides readers through the various texts that provide much of historians' knowledge about Lincoln's boyhood. There I Grew Up helped to inspire The Better Angels, a 2014 American biographical drama-historical film about Lincoln's formative years. Bartelt also served as a historical consultant for the film, with the film's director A. J. Edwards referring to Bartelt as the "greatest living scholar on Abraham Lincoln's youth in Indiana." Together with Joshua Claybourn, he co-edited Abe's Youth: Shaping the Future President (Indiana University Press, 2019).

Bartelt is a leader within several Lincoln-related organizations. He is vice-chair and board member of the Abraham Lincoln Association, was appointed by President George W. Bush to the federal Abraham Lincoln Bicentennial Commission's advisory and education committees, and served as vice chair of the Indiana Abraham Lincoln Bicentennial Commission. Bartelt lectures before Civil War and Lincoln groups and at museums, colleges, and historical societies conferences throughout the country.

In addition to his Lincoln scholarship, Bartelt serves on the board of trustees of the Indiana Historical Society and received the Indiana Historical Society's "Hoosier Historian" award in 2003. He taught social studies at Harrison High School from 1968 until 2005 where he also chaired the social studies department, and he served as an adjunct instructor at the University of Southern Indiana from 1986 until 2007. Bartelt has also been president of the Vanderburgh County Historical Society, president of the Evansville Museum of Arts, History and Science, and served as historian of Trinity United Methodist Church in Evansville.

== Publications ==
=== Books ===
- Bartelt, William (2001). Trinity United Methodist Church. Evansville, Ind.: M.T. Publishing Company, Inc.
- Bartelt, William; Lonnberg, Thomas; McCutchan, Kenneth, eds. (2004) Evansville, at the Bend in the River: An Illustrated History. Sun Valley, Calif.: Amer Historical Press.
- Bartelt, William, ed. (2008). There I Grew Up: Remembering Abraham Lincoln's Indiana Youth. Indianapolis: Indiana Historical Society.
- Bartelt, William; Claybourn, Joshua, eds. (2019). Abe's Youth: Shaping the Future President. Bloomington: Indiana University Press.

=== Journal articles ===
- Bartelt, William (September 1991). "The Land Dealings of Spencer County, Indiana, Pioneer Thomas Lincoln". Indiana Magazine of History. 81 (3): 211–223. JSTOR 27791486.
- Bartelt, William (June 13, 2001). "Lincoln in Spencer County" (PDF). Lincoln'Bicentennial'Planning.
- Bartelt, William (2004). "Pebbles or Diamonds: How Do We Know What We Know About Lincoln in Indiana?" (PDF). Historic Southern Indiana Lincoln Institute.
- Bartelt, William (October 2007). "Lincoln, Race, and Slavery Before 1858: The Key Documents". OAH Magazine of History. 21 (4): 31–35. doi:10.1093/maghis/21.4.31.
- Bartelt, William (Summer 2015). "The Making of "The Better Angels"". Journal of the Abraham Lincoln Association. 36 (2): 48–52. JSTOR 26290287.
