= McConnell–Neve House =

Historic house in Virginia, United States

- U.S. National Register of Historic Places
- Virginia Landmarks Register
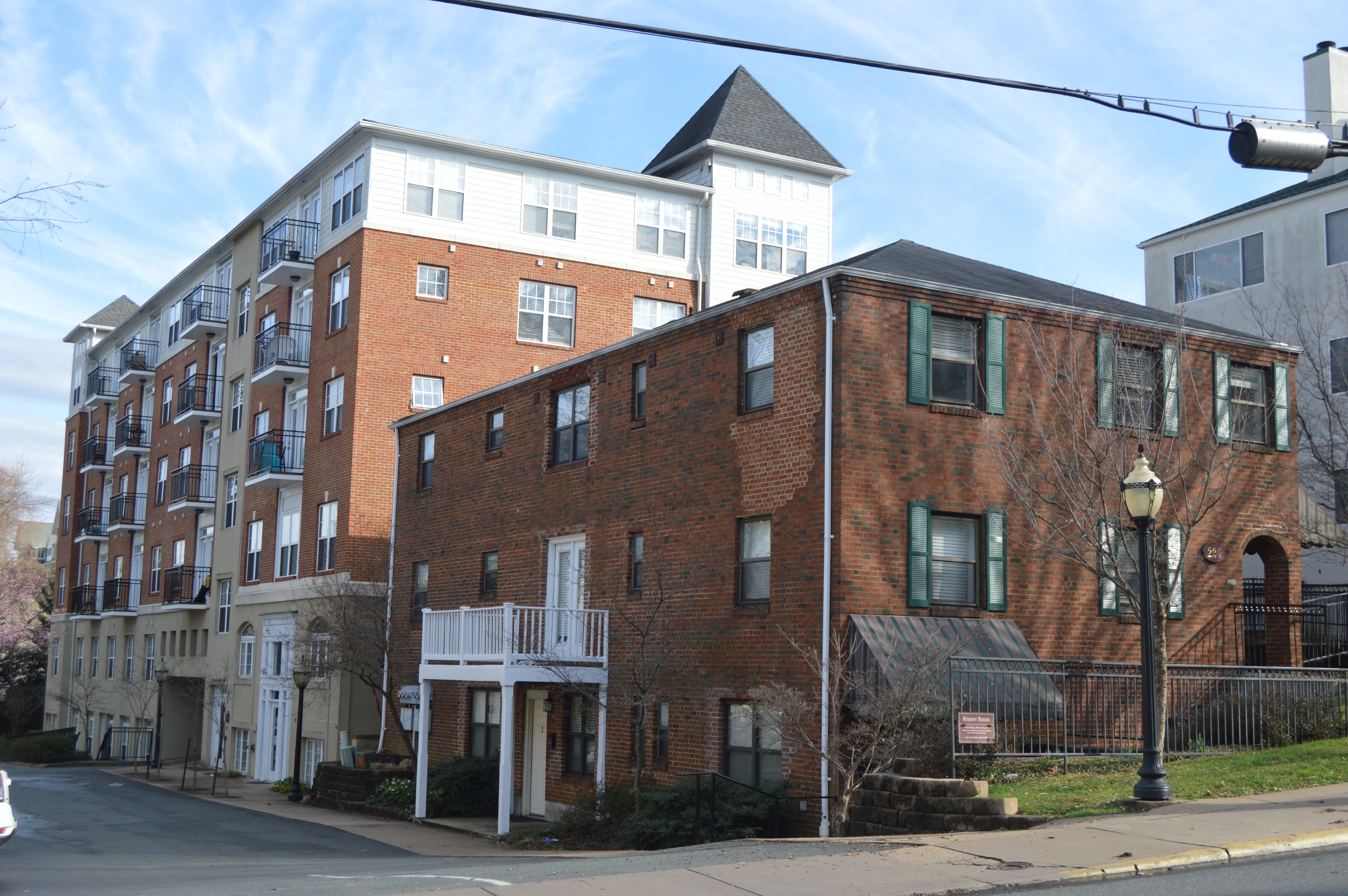
- Apartments on the site of the house

- Location within Virginia Location within the United States
- Location: 228 14th St., NW, Charlottesville, Virginia
- Coordinates: 38°2′11″N 78°29′35″W
- Area: 0.3 acres (0.12 ha)
- Built: 1894
- Architectural style: Late Victorian, Victorian
- MPS: Charlottesville MRA
- NRHP reference No.: 83003271
- VLR No.: 104-0397

Significant dates
- Added to NRHP: August 10, 1983
- Designated VLR: October 20, 1981

McConnell–Neve House is a historic home located at Charlottesville, Virginia. It was built in 1894, and is a two-story, three-bay, Late Victorian style frame dwelling with a 1 1/2-story wing. It is sheathed in wooden shingles. It features high-pitched hipped roof, irregular silhouette, and slender three-story octagonal tower with steep pyramidal roof. The house has been divided into apartments.

It was listed on the National Register of Historic Places in 1983.
