= McConnell (surname) =

McConnell or McConnel is an Irish and Scottish surname. It is derived from the Gaelic Mac Dhòmhnaill (see MacDonnell). Alternatively in Ireland, it may be derived from Mac Conaill meaning 'son of Conall', a given name composed of the elements con (from cú meaning 'hound') and gal (meaning 'valour').

== Notable people ==
- Aaron McConnell (born 1980), American football player
- Alex McConnell, Scottish footballer
- Allyson McConnell (1978-2013), Australian convicted killer who drowned her two children in Canada
- Brent McConnell, Australian rugby league footballer
- David H. McConnell, founder and president California Perfume Company
- Dorsey W. M. McConnell, bishop of the Episcopal Diocese of Pittsburgh
- Doug McConnell, American television travel host
- Drew McConnell, musician
- Jack McConnell, Scottish politician
- J. C. McConnell, scientific illustrator
- James McConnell (engineer), British locomotive engineer
- James McConnell (Medal of Honor), Philippine–American War Medal of Honor recipient
- James Robert McConnell (1915–1999), Irish theoretical physicist, pontifical academician, Monsignor
- James V. McConnell, biologist
- Joe McConnell (1939–2018), American sports announcer
- John McConnell (footballer, born 1881), Scottish footballer
- John McConnell (footballer, born 1885), Scottish footballer
- John H. McConnell, American businessman
- John Michael McConnell, United States Director of National Intelligence
- John P. McConnell (general), (1908–1986) Chief of Staff of the United States Air Force
- John Wilson McConnell (1877–1963), Canadian businessman and major philanthropist
- Joseph C. McConnell (1922–1954), top U.S. fighter ace in the Korean War
- Lee McConnell, Scottish athlete
- Liz McConnell, American politician
- Megan McConnell (born 2001), American basketball player
- Michael W. McConnell, federal judge and legal scholar
- Mike McConnell (radio personality), radio host
- Mitch McConnell (born 1942), United States Senator and Senate Republican Leader, 2007-2025
- Newton W. McConnell (1832–1915), Chief Justice of the Territorial Montana Supreme Court
- Page McConnell, musician
- Patricia McConnell, (born 1948), American ethologist
- Robert McConnell (loyalist), Northern Irish loyalist and alleged Ulster Volunteer Force member
- Rosemary Lowe-McConnell (1921-2014), English ichthyologist, ecologist, and limnologist
- Roy McConnell (footballer) (1927–2003), Australian rules footballer
- Roy McConnell (RAF officer) (1898–1987), Canadian World War I flying ace
- Samuel K. McConnell Jr. (1901-1985), American politician
- Scott McConnell (born 1952), American journalist
- Steve McConnell, software engineer and book author
- T. J. McConnell (born 1992), American basketball player; nephew of Suzie
- T. T. McConnell (1888–1970), American college baseball coach
- Walter McConnell, ceramic artist
- William McConnel, mill and quarry owner

== See also ==
- Suzie McConnell-Serio (born 1966), American basketball player and coach
- McDonnell (surname)
