= Thomas Meton Macdonnell =

American politician

Member of the U.S. House of Representatives from Missouri's 140th district

Missouri House of Representatives
- Incumbent
- Assumed office 1987

Personal details
- Born: 1923 Buchanan, Michigan
- Died: 2022 (aged 98–99)
- Party: Democratic
- Spouse: Ann Ruth Martin
- Children: 8
- Occupation: family doctor and obstetrician

Thomas Meton Macdonnell (January 9, 1923 - July 10, 2022) was a Democratic politician from Marshfield, Missouri, who served in the Missouri House of Representatives. He was born in Buchanan, Michigan, and was educated at Marshfield schools, Drury College, Southwest Missouri State College, the University of Missouri-Columbia, and Indiana University School of Medicine. In 1942 or 1943, he enlisted in the United States Army and received orders to join the Normandy Invasion as a sharpshooter and half-track gunner. He fought at Omaha Beach and at the Battle of the Bulge where he hit a land mine. During the war, he received the Silver Star and two Purple Hearts. On February 24, 1952, he married Ann Ruth Martin. He and his father opened the Marshfield Clinic in Marshfield, Missouri. Dr. Thomas Macdonnell died in 2022 at the age of 99.
