= Peter McDonnell =

Peter McDonnell may refer to:

- Peter McDonnell (footballer) (born 1953), English footballer
- Peter McDonnell (rugby union) (c. 1874–1950), New Zealand rugby union player
- Peter J. McDonnell, American ophthalmologist
