= Trade Expansion Act =

1962 US law on tariffs

Trade Expansion Act of 1962
- Long title: An Act to promote the general welfare, foreign policy, and security of the United States through international trade agreements and through adjustment assistance to domestic industry, agriculture, and labor, and for other purposes
- Enacted by: the 87th United States Congress

Citations
- Public law: 19 U.S.C. ch. 7

Legislative history
- Introduced in the House; Committee consideration by House Ways and Means, Senate Finance; Passed the House on June 28, 1962 (298–125); Passed the Senate on September 19, 1962 (78–8); Signed into law by President John F. Kennedy on October 11, 1962

The Trade Expansion Act of 1962 (Pub. L. 87–794, 76 Stat. 872, enacted October 11, 1962, codified at 19 U.S.C. ch. 7) is an American trade law.

The law was intended to maintain American economic influence in the wake of the creation of the European Economic Community.

The Trade Expansion Act granted the president of the United States unprecedented authority to negotiate tariff reductions of up to 50%. It paved the way for the Kennedy Round of General Agreement on Tariffs and Trade (GATT) negotiations, concluding on June 30, 1967, the last day before expiration of the Act.

Section 232 of the act permits the president to impose tariffs based on a recommendation by the U.S. secretary of commerce if "an article is being imported into the United States in such quantities or under such circumstances as to threaten or impair the national security." This section was used only in 1979 and 1982, and had not been invoked since the creation of the World Trade Organization in 1995, until President Trump cited it on March 8, 2018, to impose tariffs on steel and aluminum.

== Background ==
In the early 1960s US politicians were worried about the growing influence of the European Economic Community and the ever-present influence of the Soviet Union. President John F. Kennedy determined that a loosening of trade restrictions would spark an increase in economic growth and keep the American economy competitive. Therefore, they began to champion a new trade act that would give the President the authority to revamp US trade policy. Republicans and some industry leaders were initially skeptical, however, and believed that a loosening of trade policy would cause significant harm to American domestic industries and workers, especially amidst a persistent unemployment issue.

== Provisions ==
The act's stated purpose is to stimulate the US economy through the lowering of trade barriers, with a focus on countering Communist economic influence. To accomplish this goal the act granted the President a 5-year authority to reduce or increase tariffs by a maximum of 50% the initial level. The President was also empowered to eliminate trade barriers on goods that the United States and EEC combined accounted for at least 80% of the market, with agricultural products being exempt to the 80% rule. A "Tariff Commission" would also be created that was tasked with advising the President on the economic effect of adjustments to tariff policy. The law also created the Office of the United States Trade Representative. This office would serve as the primary negotiator with foreign countries concerning trade. The President and the Tariff Commission would also be required to submit annual reports to congress on their activities under the act. Many, however, were concerned about negative impacts to domestic industries as a result of these adjustments, to soften the blow a system was created that would allow industry leaders, firms, and workers to submit petitions to the Tariff Commission for relief. In the event the Tariff Commission found that damage was done as a result of the new trade policies it would require the President to offer assistance. This could take many forms; The President could invoke the "Escape Clause" which allowed the president to rapidly raise tariffs again. The President could also provide monetary aid to businesses in the form of loans or tax-breaks. Workers could be eligible to receive unemployment aid or even retraining. Another avenue would be the imposing of international quotas to protect industries.

== Legislative Timeline ==
The act started its journey with a massive public relations campaign spearheaded by the Kennedy administration. The goal of the campaign was to frame the act as necessary in order to maintain national security. The campaign also sought to reach out to important interest groups, highlighting how they could benefit from the reforms in the proposed legislation.

== The House ==
The act was officially introduced in the House on August 8, 1961, and would remain in committee for the remainder of the year and into 1962. It passed through the House Committee on Ways and Means, and the House Committee on Rules, with the Ways and Means committee making modifications to the bill. The most important was the addition of an "Escape Clause" section. Which, In the event of economic damages, the President would be required to lower tariffs to compensate. Protectionists attempted to kill the bill on June 12, 1962, in committee by having it recommitted, but their attempt was unsuccessful. The act then passed the House on June 29, by a significant margin with no amendments made on the floor.

== The Senate and Passage ==
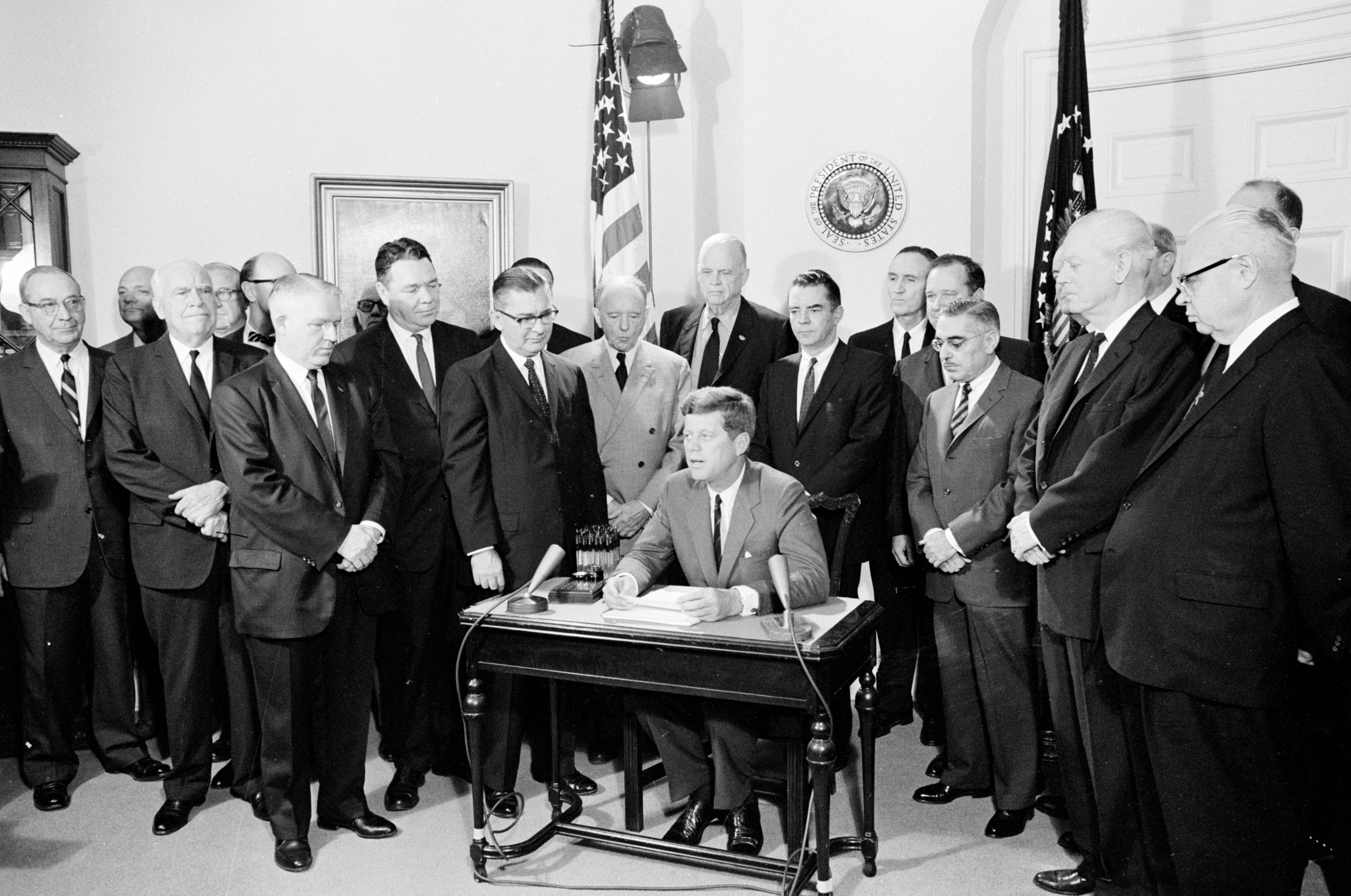
President John F. Kennedy (seated) announcing the signing of the Trade Expansion Act of 1962.

The Senate Committee on Finance deliberated for several weeks sent the bill to the floor on September 14th. The Finance committee version was similar to the House version, but it differed in that it restored the most favored nation status of Yugoslavia and the Polish People's Republic. This was previously added by the House as a means to combat Communist economic influence and would become a point of debate between the two branches. On the floor the legislation was subject to a lengthy amendment process before being passed by a wide margin on September 19. Both the Senate and House agreed to a conference committee to resolve their differences. The committee agreed to strip out the provision restoring the most favored nation status for Yugoslavia and Poland and revert other changes to the House version. The bill was then sent to Kennedy on October 4 and signed on October 11.

== Recent Developments ==
On April 27, 2017, President Donald Trump ordered a review of the aluminum imports and threats to national security under the Trade Expansion Act of 1962. On March 8, 2018, President Trump signed an order to impose the tariffs on steel and aluminum under Section 232 of the act and citing "national security" grounds.

Trump continued the use of Section 232 in his second term, applying tariffs on imported cars, small trucks, engines, and other auto parts, softwood timber and lumber, upholstered wooden furniture and kitchen cabinets, medium- and heavy-duty trucks, busses and their parts. These tariffs are assessed based on the full value of the imported goods, not reduced foreign pricing.

When the United States Supreme Court ruled in Learning Resources v. Trump that his widespread Liberation Day tariffs against all imports from several countries was unlawful under the International Emergency Economic Powers Act authority Trump claimed, Trump pledged to find other ways to set tariffs without the help of Congress. Several have suggested Section 232 could be one of the options used. Section 232 tariffs are expected to be more difficult for courts to review as they typically defer to the executive branch for matters of national security, according to The New York Times. Trump enacted 20% tariffs under Section 232 on branded pharmaceuticals, potentially increasing them by an additional 20% each year for five years, on April 2, 2026, citing a review by the Commerce Department claiming this fell under a national security issue. These would only apply to pharmaceutical manufacturers that had yet agreed to build plants within the United States, agreements that companies like Pfizer, AstraZeneca and Novo had already met, nor would apply to generic drugs.

== See also ==
- Trade Act of 1974
- Smoot–Hawley Tariff Act
