= Roger MacDonnell =

Roger Lindsay MacDonnell
- Occupations: Businessman, advertising executive
- Known for: Co-founding Colenso advertising agency (1969); involvement in major political advertising campaigns including the 1975 “Dancing Cossacks” ad
- Notable work: Colenso (co-founder)

Roger Lindsay MacDonnell is a New Zealand businessman who co-founded the advertising agency Colenso in 1969. The agency gained notoriety for Michael Wall's "Dancing Cossacks" ad for the National Party in 1975. MacDonnell retired from Colenso in 2010. That year he was appointed to the TVNZ Board by Minister of Broadcasting Jonathan Coleman. MacDonnell was TVNZ Board member for six years. In 2016 he joined TRA, an insight agency in Auckland.
