= McConnell Peak =

Mountain in California, United States

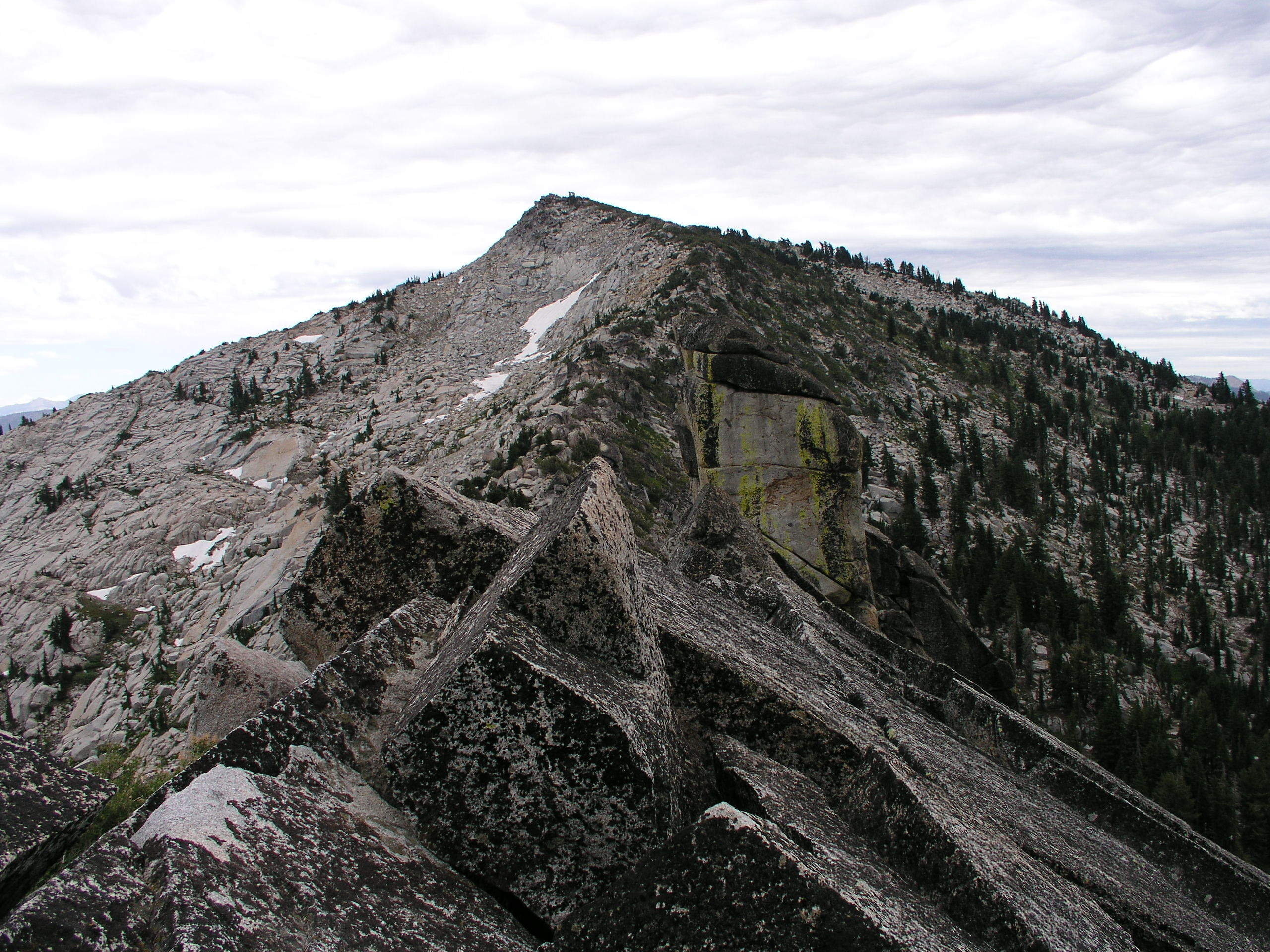

Highest point
- Elevation: 9,103 ft (2,775 m) NAVD 88
- Prominence: 19 ft (5.8 m)
- Listing: Tahoe OGUL Mountaineer Peak
- Coordinates: 38°56′55″N 120°14′35″W

Geography
- Location within California Location within the United States
- Location: El Dorado County, California, U.S.
- Parent range: Sierra Nevada
- Topo map: USGS Rockbound Valley

Climbing
- Easiest route: Scramble, class 2

McConnell Peak is a mountain in the Sierra Nevada mountain range at the north end of the Crystal Mountains, to the west of Lake Tahoe. It is located in the Desolation Wilderness in El Dorado County, California.
