= Andy McDonell =

Australian rules footballer

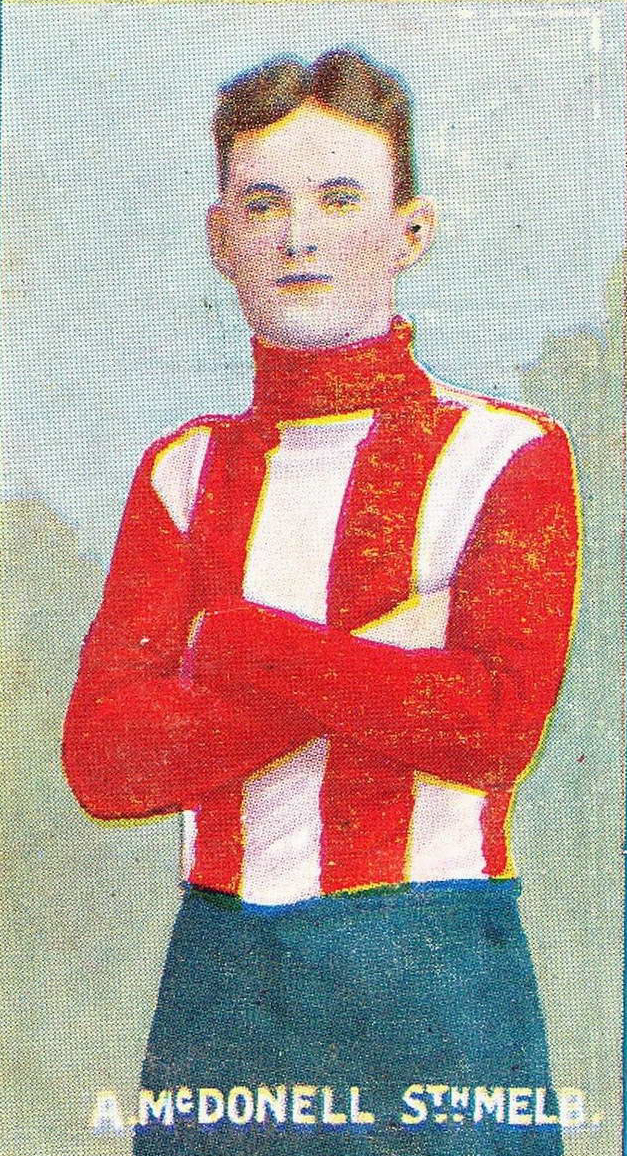
- Cigarette card of McDonell in 1907

Personal information
- Full name: Andrew Francis McDonell
- Born: 24 August 1882; Albert Park, Victoria
- Died: 29 September 1942 (aged 60); Melbourne, Victoria

Playing career^{1}
| Years | Club | Games (Goals) |
| 1905–1906 | South Melbourne | 6 (1) |
- ^{1} Playing statistics correct to the end of 1906.

Andrew Francis McDonell (24 August 1882 – 29 September 1942) was an Australian rules footballer who played for the South Melbourne Football Club in the Victorian Football League (VFL).
