= Gerard Magliocca =

American law professor

- Born: February 6, 1973 (age 53); East Brunswick, New Jersey, U.S.
- Education: Stanford University (BA); Yale University (JD)
- Occupations: Law professor; legal commentator
- Awards: Guggenheim Fellowship (2026)

Gerard Magliocca (born February 6, 1973) is an American legal scholar who is a Distinguished Professor and the Lawrence A. Jegen III Professor at the Indiana University Robert H. McKinney School of Law. He is a noted scholar and expert on constitutional issues, particularly their historical underpinnings.

On April 14, 2026, Magliocca was named a Guggenheim Fellow, specifically he was awarded The Dorothy Tapper Goldman Guggenheim Fellowship in Constitutional Studies.

== Biography ==
Magliocca received his B.A. degree from Stanford University and his J.D. degree from Yale Law School. He served for a year as a law clerk for Judge Guido Calabresi on the United States Court of Appeals for the Second Circuit and then two years as an attorney at Covington & Burling. Thereafter, Magliocca joined the faculty at Indiana University Robert H. McKinney School of Law.

Magliocca's first book, Andrew Jackson and the Constitution (University Press of Kansas, 2007), describes the differences in political and constitutional reinterpretations that arise when a new generation gains control of the government. Using the Jacksonian era as a model he contends that political and constitutional understandings are cyclical, based on roughly thirty-year intervals, suggesting that the U.S. Constitution is a living document. The book was the subject of an hour-long program on C-SPAN's Book TV. His second book, The Tragedy of William Jennings Bryan (Yale Univ. Press 2011), explores how William Jennings Bryan's campaigns for the presidency energized conservatives and transformed constitutional law by prompting a negative response to the populist agenda.

Magliocca's third book, American Founding Son (NYU Press, 2013), focuses on John Bingham and his role in crafting the 14th Amendment to the U.S. Constitution. Pushing back against many who tend to overlook Bingham, Magliocca argues he deserves to be remembered as one of America's great leaders. The book received critical praise, including from Laurie Levenson in the Los Angeles Review of Books, who wrote, "Professor Magliocca spares no detail in his comprehensive review of John Bingham’s life and his drafting of the 14th Amendment to the Constitution."

Magliocca's fourth book, The Heart of the Constitution (Oxford University Press, 2018), examines the Bill of Rights and portrays it as "a mirror for how America sees itself," taking a different form "every political season." He highlights the role of the Bill of Rights in distinguishing America during the 20th century from the totalitarian forces, its importance of its civil liberties during the Cold War, and its elevation over the past 150 years to achieve a more inclusive and egalitarian view of American society. A review in the Washington Post read, "the punchline of Magliocca's book is that our modern view of the Bill of Rights is far too stultifying. . . . [A]s we face a new set of crises, from war to inequality to structural exclusion, a more dynamic debate over a 21st-century bill of rights might offer some avenues forward. Magliocca's book can help us start that debate." The book also received critical praise from Kirkus Reviews and Allen Guelzo in The Wall Street Journal.

Contributing to the anthology Our American Story (2019), Magliocca addressed the possibility of a shared American narrative and focused on insights a foreigner's view of America may offer, in particular the Americans' "uncommon degree of political common sense."

In 2008 Magliocca held the Fulbright-Dow Distinguished Research Chair of the Roosevelt Study Center in Middelburg, The Netherlands. He was elected to the American Law Institute in 2013. He has received several awards for his teaching, including Best New Professor Award, the Black Cane (Most Outstanding Professor), and the Indiana University Trustees Teaching Award. Magliocca was named to the 2019–2020 class of fellows for the Fred W. Smith National Library for the Study of George Washington at Mount Vernon with a research topic of "Washington's Heir: The Life of Justice Bushrod Washington."

Magliocca is a frequent contributor to legal blogs Balkinization and Concurring Opinions. Much of his work set out in three books explores how major changes in American political and constitutional development occur generationally in roughly thirty-year intervals and move from dominant regime to the emergence of a counter-regime.

== Works ==
=== Books as author ===
- The Heart of the Constitution: How the Bill of Rights Became the Bill of Rights (New York: Oxford University Press, 2018)
- American Founding Son: John Bingham and the Invention of the Fourteenth Amendment (New York University Press, 2013)
- The Tragedy of William Jennings Bryan: Constitutional Law and the Politics of Backlash (Yale University Press, 2011)
- Andrew Jackson and the Constitution: The Rise and Fall of Generational Regimes (University Press of Kansas 2007; paperback edition 2011)
- Washington's Heir: The Life of Justice Bushrod Washington (New York: Oxford University Press, 2022) ISBN 978-0190947040.
- The Actual Art of Governing: Justice Robert H. Jackson's Concurring Opinion in the Steel Seizure Case (Oxford University Press, 2025, forthcoming)

=== Books as a contributor ===
- "Constitutional Change" in The Oxford Handbook of the American Constitution, Mark Graber, Sandy Levinson & Mark Tushnet, eds. (Oxford Univ. Press, 2015)
- "Yankee Ingenuity" in Our American Story: The Search for a Shared National Narrative, Joshua Claybourn, ed. (Potomac Books, 2019)
