= Liberation Day tariffs =

2025 economic policy by Donald Trump

Liberation Day speech
- Part of Tariffs in the second Trump administration
- Footage of the speech
- Date: April 2, 2025
- Duration: 53 minutes
- Venue: White House Rose Garden
- Location: Washington D.C., United States
- Participants: Donald Trump
- Footage: C-SPAN

United States president Donald Trump announced a broad package of import duties on April 2, 2025—a date he called "Liberation Day". In a White House Rose Garden ceremony, Trump signed Executive Order 14257, Regulating Imports With a Reciprocal Tariff to Rectify Trade Practices That Contribute to Large and Persistent Annual United States Goods Trade Deficits. This order declared a national emergency over the United States' trade deficit and invoked the International Emergency Economic Powers Act (IEEPA) to authorize sweeping tariffs on foreign imports.

Executive Order 14257 raised tariffs on nearly all countries to 10% beginning April 5, with higher rates for major trading partners scheduled to begin April 9. The Trump administration called the tariffs "reciprocal", asserting they mirrored and counteracted trade barriers faced by U.S. exports. Trade analysts rejected this characterization, noting that the tariffs often exceeded those imposed by foreign countries and included countries with which the U.S. had a trade surplus. Economists argued that the formula used to calculate the "reciprocal" tariffs was overly simplistic with little relation to trade barriers.

Trump also signed Executive Order 14256, Further Amendment to Duties Addressing the Synthetic Opioid Supply Chain in the People's Republic of China as Applied to Low-Value Imports, which closed the United States de minimis exemption for imports from China and further escalated the China–United States trade war.

The "Liberation Day" tariff announcement led to the 2025 stock market crash. In response, the White House suspended the April 9 tariff increases to allow time for negotiation. By July 31, Trump had announced deals with eight trading partners: the UK, Vietnam, the Philippines, Indonesia, Japan, South Korea, the EU, and a truce expiring August 12 with China. He ordered country-specific "reciprocal" tariffs to resume on August 7, 2025.

On May 28, 2025, the United States Court of International Trade ruled in a lawsuit that Trump had overstepped his authority in imposing tariffs under the IEEPA and ordered that the "Liberation Day" tariffs be vacated. The ruling was upheld by the Federal Circuit Court of Appeals on August 29. The Trump administration appealed to the U.S. Supreme Court, which, in February 2026, in the case of Learning Resources, Inc. v. Trump, affirmed the decision of the appeals court that Trump's use of emergency powers to enact the tariffs was not legal.

== Background ==
Prior to his Liberation Day announcement, Trump had implemented several tariff policies since returning to office in January 2025, including duties on steel and aluminum imports as well as tariffs targeting China, Canada, and Mexico. The administration had also announced a 25% tariff on imported automobiles and automotive parts scheduled to take effect at midnight on April 3, 2025. These previous measures had already increased the average U.S. tariff rate to approximately 12%, the highest level since World War II according to Deutsche Bank Research.

== Country-specific tariffs implemented under IEEPA ==
Executive Order 14257
- Regulating Imports with a Reciprocal Tariff to Rectify Trade Practices that Contribute to Large and Persistent Annual United States Goods Trade Deficits
- Front page of Executive Order 14257
- Type: Executive order
- Number: 14257
- President: Donald Trump
- Signed: April 2, 2025

Federal Register details
- Federal Register document number: 2025-06063
- Publication date: April 7, 2025

=== Development ===
In a memo signed February 13, 2025, Trump directed his staff to research both monetary and non-monetary trade barriers imposed by foreign countries against U.S. exports and to develop custom "reciprocal tariffs" to counter and penalize each one. He instructed them to consider factors such as existing tariffs, exchange rates, and trade balances in their analysis. Lutnick said his team would have a plan ready by April 1, 2025. Trump announced that he would unveil the reciprocal tariffs on April 2, 2025, a date he referred to as Liberation Day.

Reuters reported the Trump administration struggled to design reciprocal tariffs because each of the 186 members of the World Customs Organization applied different duties. The administration initially considered dividing all countries into tiers of high, medium, and low trade barriers. Later, Treasury Secretary Scott Bessent and National Economic Council director Kevin Hassett told Fox Business that the administration would focus on the United States' largest trading partners and assign each individualized tariff rates. Hassett stated that "more than 100 countries don't really have any tariffs on us and don't have any non-tariff barriers" and that only "10 to 15 countries" were a concern.

However, on March 30 Trump told reporters, "I don't know who told you 10 or 15", dismissing the idea as a "rumor" and reiterating plans to implement tariffs globally. Although numerous countries attempted to preemptively negotiate deals in the weeks leading up to April 2, no exemptions were granted. The lack of clarity contributed to economic volatility.

Bloomberg News reported Senior Counselor Peter Navarro had urged Trump to adopt either a 25% global import tariff or a "reciprocal" tariff formula based on trade deficits, while Bessent and Hassett supported more nuanced and targeted tariffs. Bessent encouraged using tariffs primarily as a negotiating tool, while Navarro saw them as a means to transform trade relationships. Trump ultimately adopted Navarro's idea of "reciprocal" tariffs.

=== Announcement ===
In a White House Rose Garden address on April 2, 2025, Trump declared the day to be Liberation Day, describing it as "one of the most important days in American history" and "our declaration of economic independence". The President signed Executive Order 14257, which declared a "national emergency" to address what he described as a "large and persistent U.S. trade deficit". Trump stated, "We're going to start being smart, and we're going to start being very wealthy again." He said the new policy would boost domestic production, create American jobs, and generate "trillions and trillions of dollars to reduce our taxes and pay down our national debt". Trump characterized the tariff implementation as "kind", saying the U.S. would tariff other countries at half the rate the administration had calculated their trade barriers to be worth.

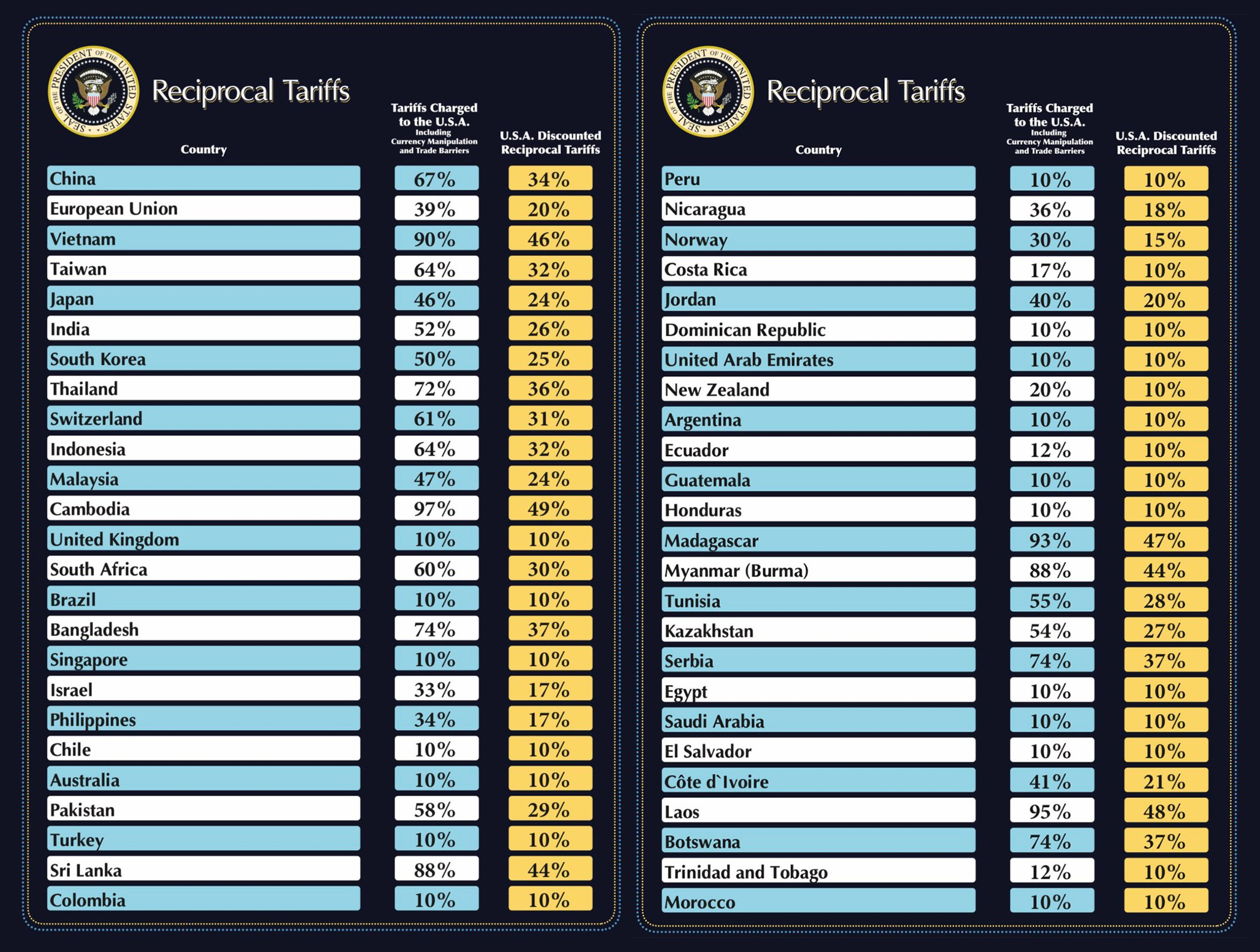
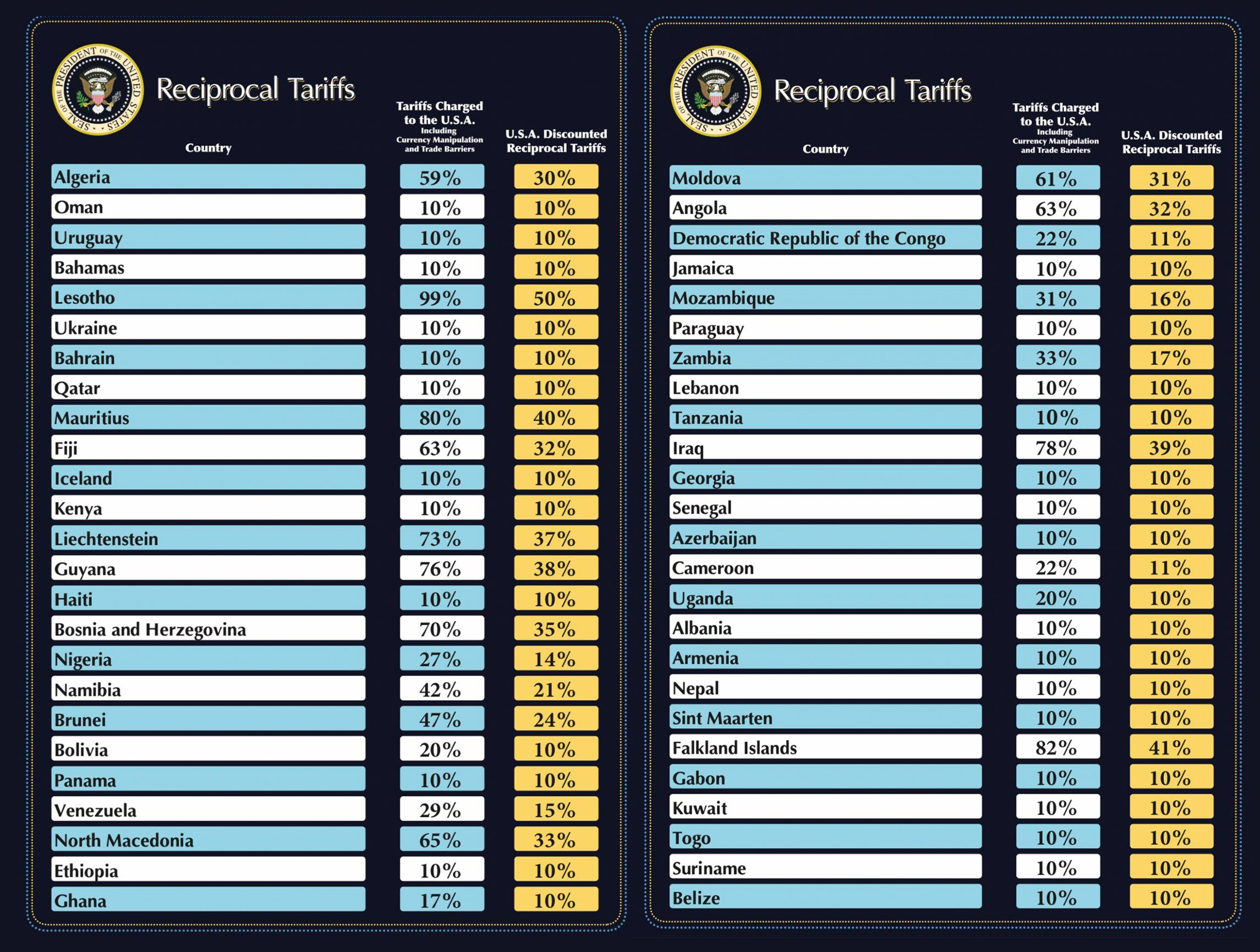
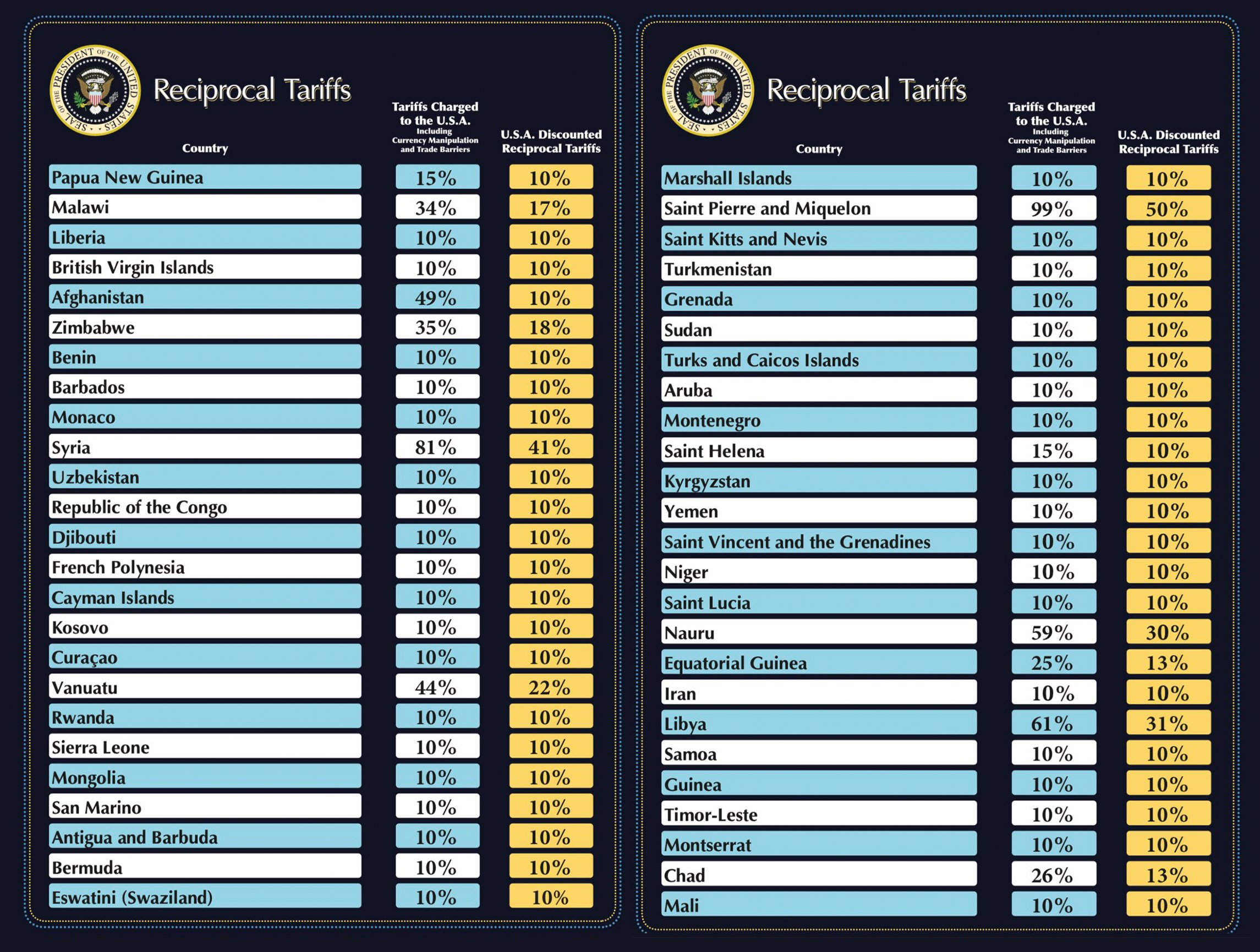
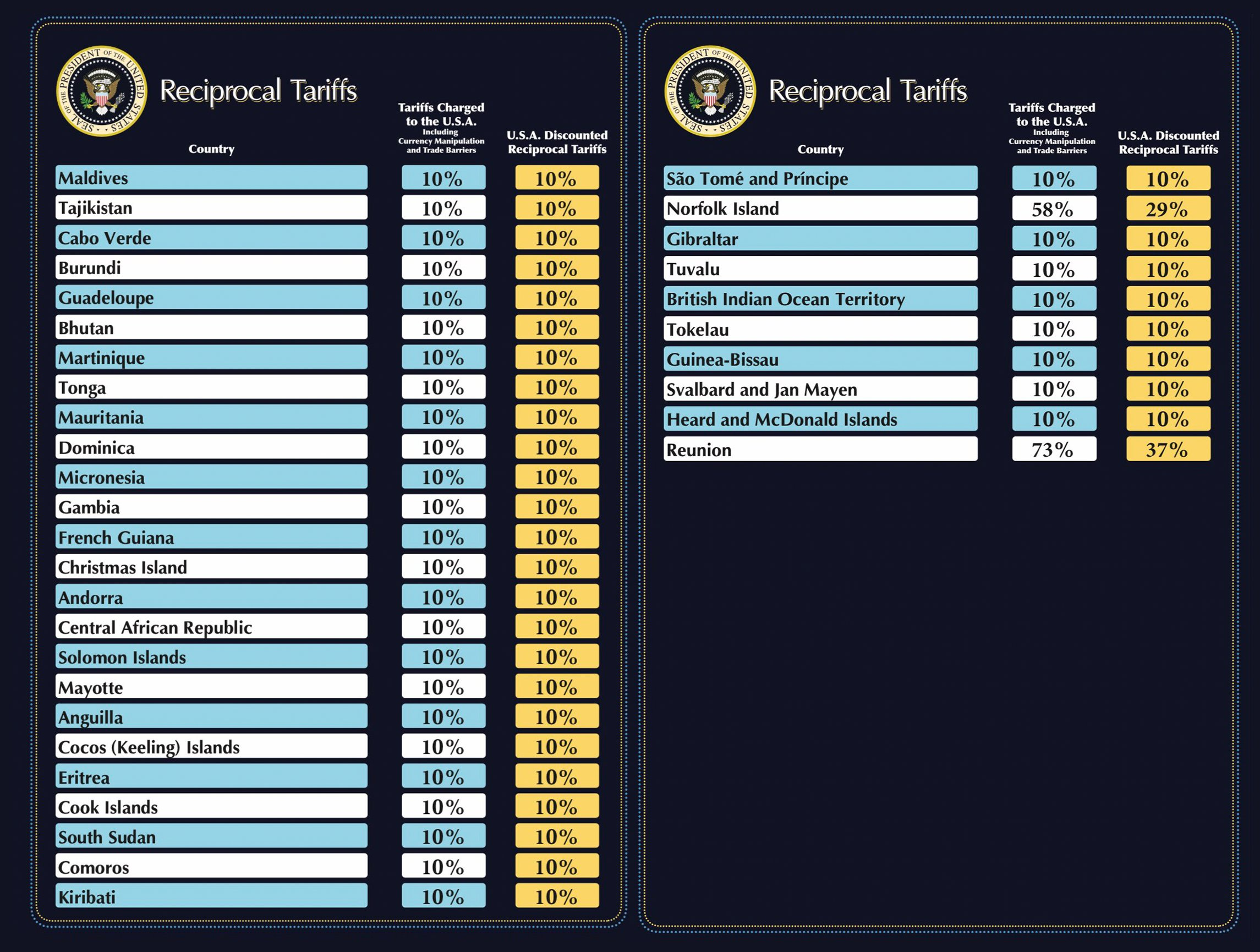
Tables of all countries and territories affected and associated tariff rates. The amounts listed as "Tariffs charged to the USA" are disputed by most economists, for instance, Heard Island and McDonald Islands are uninhabited. (Not all countries receiving the 10% tariff were explicitly listed in the presented tables.)

Trump unveiled a two-tier tariff structure: a baseline 10% tariff applied to imports from all countries not subject to other sanctions, and additional country-specific "reciprocal" tariffs ranging between 11% and 50% for the countries with which the U.S. had the greatest trade deficits. The administration asserted that trade deficits were representative of unfair trade practices, an idea disputed by economists. The 10% baseline tariff would begin at 12:01 a.m. EDT on April 5, 2025 (04:01 UTC), while the higher country-specific rates would commence at 12:01 a.m. EDT on April 9, 2025.

=== Excluded goods ===
Tariffs on certain goods were excluded. These included all articles subject to 50 USC 1702(b), such as books and other informational materials, goods separately impacted by Section 232 tariffs, products from Mexico and Canada compliant with USMCA, except for goods targeted by Section 232 tariffs, imports from countries subject to Column 2 of the HTSUS, which at the time were Cuba, North Korea, Russia, and Belarus. Smartphones, computers and various electronic parts were exempted on April 11. Various agricultural products, including coffee, tea, fruits and beef, were exempted on November 14, 2025.

"Reciprocal" tariff rates
Region	As of August 1, 2025	As of April 9, 2025
Afghanistan	15%	10%
Algeria	30%	30%
Angola	15%	32%
Bangladesh	20%	37%
Bolivia	15%	10%
Bosnia and Herzegovina	30%	35%
Botswana	15%	37%
Brazil	10% (Note: Although the "reciprocal" tariff rate for Brazil remained at 10%, in a separate executive order Trump declared a "national emergency" regarding the "actions of the Government of Brazil" and imposed an additional 40% tariff on some Brazilian exports beginning August 6.)	10%
Brunei	25%	24%
Cambodia	19%	49%
Cameroon	15%	11%
Chad	15%	13%
China	10%	34%
DRC	15%	11%
Ecuador	15%	10%
Equatorial Guinea	15%	13%
European Union	15%	20%
Falkland Islands (UK)	10%	41%
Fiji	15%	32%
Guyana	15%	38%
Iceland	15%	10%
India	25% (Note: Although the "reciprocal" tariff rate for India remained at 25%, in a separate executive order Trump imposed an additional 25% tariff effective August 27 as a penalty for India's purchases of Russian oil.)	26%
Indonesia	19%	32%
Iraq	35%	39%
Israel	15%	17%
Ivory Coast	15%	21%
Japan	15%	24%
Jordan	15%	20%
Kazakhstan	25%	27%
Laos	40%	48%
Lesotho	15%	50%
Libya	30%	31%
Liechtenstein	15%	37%
Madagascar	15%	47%
Malawi	15%	17%
Malaysia	19%	24%
Mauritius	15%	40%
Moldova	25%	31%
Mozambique	15%	16%
Myanmar	40%	44%
Namibia	15%	21%
Nauru	15%	30%
New Zealand	15%	10%
Nicaragua	18%	18%
Nigeria	15%	14%
North Macedonia	15%	33%
Norway	15%	15%
Pakistan	19%	29%
Papua New Guinea	15%	10%
Philippines	19%	17%
Serbia	35%	37%
South Africa	30%	30%
South Korea	15%	25%
Sri Lanka	20%	44%
Switzerland	39%	31%
Syria	41%	41%
Taiwan	20%	32%
Thailand	19%	36%
Tunisia	25%	28%
Turkey	15%	10%
Uganda	15%	10%
United Kingdom	10%	10%
Vanuatu	15%	22%
Venezuela	15%	15%
Vietnam	20%	46%
Zambia	15%	17%
Zimbabwe	15%	18%
All other non-exempt countries	10%	10%

=== Formula calculation ===
Soon after the unveiling, financial journalist James Surowiecki reported that the final "reciprocal tariff" policy appeared to calculate the value of a country's trade barriers by dividing the U.S. trade deficit with the country by the value of U.S. imports from the country, where both the trade deficit and the imports focus only on goods, rather than both goods and services. The "reciprocal" tariff rate Trump imposed was then calculated by dividing that value in half. For example, dividing the US's 2024 trade deficit in goods with China, $295 billion (equivalent to $302,760,687 in 2025), by the amount that the U.S. imported from China, $439 billion (equivalent to $450,548,955 in 2025), results in the 67% trade barrier value the U.S. assigned to China: $295bn ÷ $439bn = 0.67 which, as a percentage, is 67%.

The Trump administration later published their trade barrier formula online, which simplified to the same formula. With variable i representing a country, m_{i} representing imports of goods from that country, and x_{i} representing exports of goods to that country, the formula given by the White House is as follows:

$\Delta \tau_i=\frac{x_i - m_i}{\varepsilon \times \phi \times m_i}$

The Trump administration formula included measures of elasticity set at ε = −4 and φ = 0.25, then multiplied them for ε × φ = −1, which resulted in no change except to make the result positive when ε × φ was multiplied to other parts of the calculation as defined in the formula. Thus, with x_{i} − m_{i} being the trade deficit for goods, the formula simplifies to Surowiecki's:

$\Delta \tau_i=-1 \times \frac{x_i - m_i}{m_i}$

The "discounted" tariff rate is then calculated by dividing the result by 2, making the final formula:

$\text{reciprocal tariff} = -\frac{1}{2} \times \left( \frac{\text{exports} - \text{imports}}{\text{imports}} \right)$

The Trump administration's Office of the United States Trade Representative (USTR) explained that the tariffs "are calculated as the tariff rate necessary to balance bilateral trade deficits between the U.S. and each of our trading partners", aiming to "drive bilateral trade deficits to zero". However, even countries with which the U.S. runs a trade surplus, such as Australia, received the baseline tariff of 10%.

=== Overestimation of "reciprocity" ===
The "reciprocal" tariffs are not reciprocal but rather unilateral, in that they vastly overstate tariffs imposed by US trading partners. For example, while the "reciprocal" trade-deficit based formula translates a 39% trade deficit in goods with the EU leads into a 20% tariff, actual tariffs imposed by the EU on US goods average only 3%. Research suggests that publics in core European constituencies are against reciprocal tariffs.

=== Impacted regions ===
The White House's initial list of impacted areas included the Heard Island and McDonald Islands, a remote uninhabited Antarctic territory of Australia. A tariff of 29% was proposed for Norfolk Island, which has a population around 2,000 and also belongs to Australia; the rest of Australia received a tariff of 10%. The initial list also proposed tariffs of 10% on the British Indian Ocean Territory, whose population is solely composed of the inhabitants of the joint American-British military base of Diego Garcia, numbering some 3,000 American and British military contractors.

The decision to impose tariffs on some of these regions appears to have been based on inaccurate trade data. An analysis of United States import records by The Guardian revealed that some shipments to the US were erroneously recorded as originating from remote territories instead of their actual countries of origin. These misclassified imports included items such as wine, aquarium systems, and Timberland boots.

The highest tariffs of 50% were placed on Lesotho, described by Trump as a country that "nobody had ever heard of"; a 50% tariff was also initially proposed for France's Saint Pierre and Miquelon islands, with a population of around 5,000. Other countries facing some of the highest tariffs are Cambodia (49%), Laos (48%), Madagascar (47%), Vietnam (46%), and Myanmar (44%).

=== Excluded regions ===
Six countries were exempted from the "reciprocal" tariffs: Belarus, Canada, Cuba, Mexico, North Korea, and Russia.

The White House said that Canada and Mexico were exempted because Trump previously issued executive orders imposing tariffs of 25% on the two countries for non-USMCA goods. If those orders were revoked, non-USMCA goods from Canada and Mexico would receive a 12% tariff.

Press Secretary Karoline Leavitt said that Russia had been spared the tariffs because American sanctions on Russia already "preclude meaningful trade" between the two countries, and Treasury Secretary Scott Bessent said it was because the USA has no trade with Russia. This was despite the value of U.S.-Russian trade being $3.5 billion in 2024 (equivalent to $3.592075952×10^{9} in 2025), greater than U.S. trade with countries such as Mauritius or Brunei, who were tariffed by 40% and 24% respectively.

Similarly, Leavitt cited that Belarus, Cuba, and North Korea had been exempted because American sanctions on them were already high. However, Syria, which has been under American sanctions for 20 years, did receive a heightened tariff of 41%.

=== Reactions ===
Politico described the measures as "the most significant US protectionist trade action since the 1930s", when Congress passed the Smoot–Hawley Tariff Act.

Federal Reserve chairman Jerome Powell described the tariffs, and their likely economic impact, as "significantly larger than expected".

On its website explaining the "reciprocal tariff" formula, the office of the USTR cited research papers by several economists, many of whom criticized the White House for misinterpreting and incorrectly applying their research. Anson Soderbery, whose work was cited, said his research was meant to discourage exactly the types of policies the White House was implementing. Brent Neiman said the administration used the wrong variable from his research—leading to results four times too high—and that trade deficits reflect economic fundamentals, not unfair trade.

Economic experts criticized the formula for being overly simplistic with little relation to trade barriers, with The Economist describing it as "almost as random as taxing you on the number of vowels in your name". Some economists likened fears over trade deficits to worrying about having a "deficit" with a grocery store, emphasizing that buying more than you sell in a mutually beneficial exchange is not inherently problematic. Media outlets reported that asking ChatGPT and other large language models for a global tariff formula compensating for trade deficits resulted in the same formula used by the administration.

In April 2025, a Reuters/Ipsos poll found that 73% of Americans expected a price surge under the Trump tariffs while 57% opposed the tariffs. Trump's overall approval rating dropped following the announcement.

== Closure of the de minimis exemption ==
Executive Order 14256
- Further Amendment to Duties Addressing the Synthetic Opioid Supply Chain in the People's Republic of China as Applied to Low-Value Imports
- Front page of Executive Order 14256
- Type: Executive order
- Number: 14256
- President: Donald Trump
- Signed: April 2, 2025

Federal Register details
- Federal Register document number: 2025-06063
- Publication date: April 7, 2025

The de minimis exemption waived tariffs on packages valued under $800 to reduce administrative burdens.

On Liberation Day, President Donald Trump also signed Executive Order 14256, which eliminated the de minimis exemption for imports from China and Hong Kong, and Executive Order 14257, which directed the United States to end the de minimis exemption globally once customs infrastructure was capable of doing so.

== Market crash and 90 day pause ==
The tariff announcement caused the 2025 stock market crash, with many stock market indices falling over 10% within a few days.

After prices of U.S. assets including equities, the US dollar, and bonds declined significantly on the morning of April 9, Trump announced on Truth Social that "reciprocal" tariffs above 10%, which had gone into effect that morning, would be paused for 90 days for all countries except China. Imports from all other countries were sustained at the 10% baseline tariff. Other global tariffs on products like cars, steel, and aluminum imposed previously under Section 232 of the Trade Expansion Act also remained in effect.

Politico reported that Bessent had flown to Florida a few days earlier to lobby Trump against the tariffs, warning him that the stock market would continue to decline unless he changed course. The Wall Street Journal reported that while Navarro met with Hasset on the morning of April 9, Bessent and Lutnick took advantage of Navarro's absence to speak to Trump again and convince him to pause the tariffs. After the walk back, Bessent said the pause was meant to provide time for bespoke negotiations with each country.

Trump told reporters, "I thought that people were jumping a little bit out of line ... You know, they were getting a little bit yippy, a little bit afraid". He said he had been watching the bond market, which had shown signs of crashing the night before. Bond prices dropped and interest rates soared in a scenario called bond vigilantism.

Stocks surged within minutes of the 90 day pause announcement; the S&P 500 rose 9.52% for its largest one-day gain since 2008.

On April 11, the administration exempted electronics such as smartphones and computers from the "reciprocal" tariffs. Trump shifted his focus toward negotiating trade agreements, reportedly sidelining Navarro and appointing Bessent as his top economic advisor.

== Trade deals ==
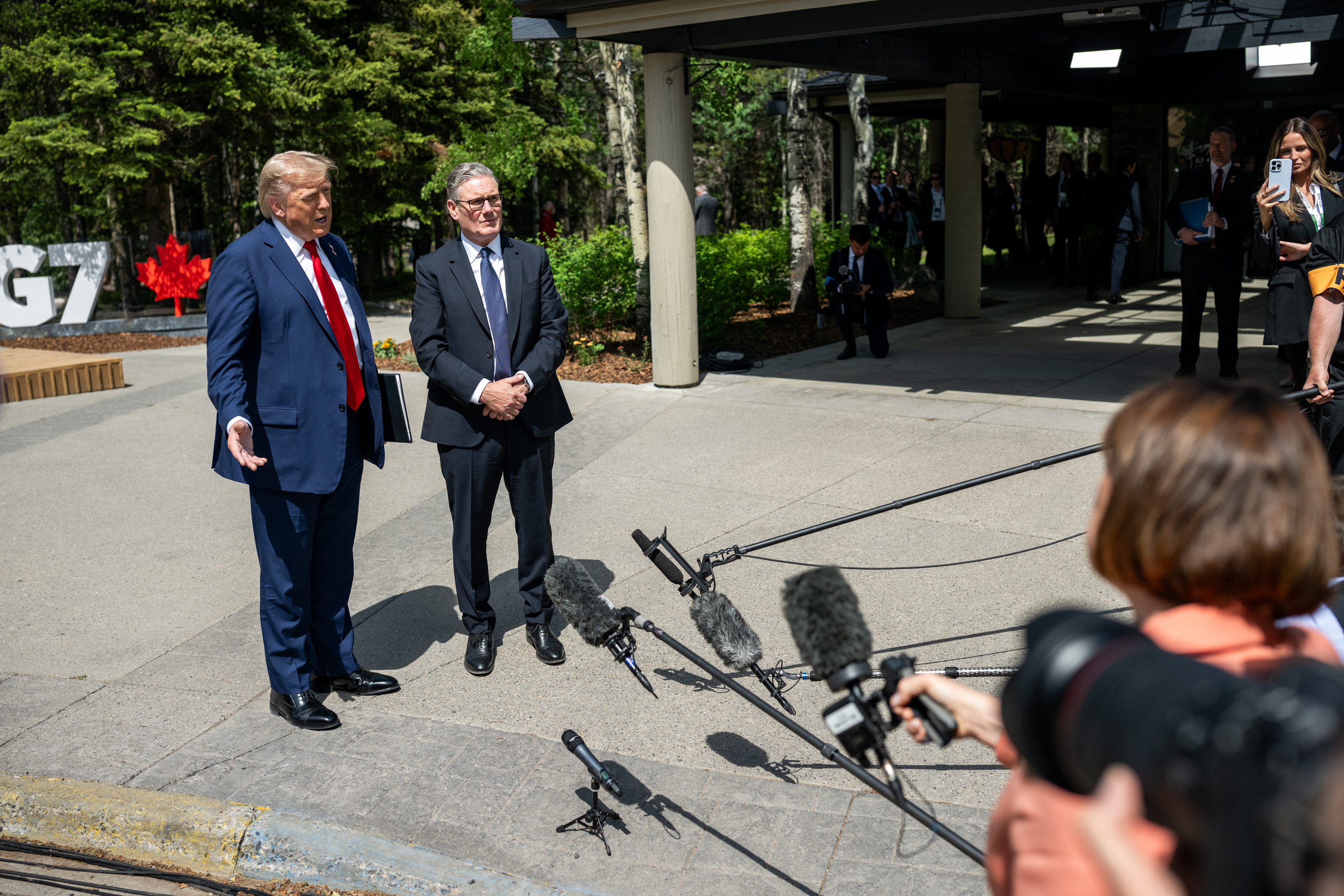
U.S. President Donald Trump and UK Prime Minister Keir Starmer present their signed trade deal at the 51st G7 summit.

Having announced the pause, White House trade advisor Peter Navarro says during an interview on Fox Business that the administration's goal is to complete trade deals with 90 countries in the next 90 days.

On May 8, 2025, the President announced his first post-Liberation Day trade deal with the United Kingdom. The U.S. reduced some Section 232 tariffs, but the 10% tariff imposed under the IEEPA remained in place. The following day, Trump stated that the 10% baseline would remain for all nations unless the United States received an “exceptional” offer.

The U.S. and China reached a temporary deal on May 12, 2025. China agreed to cut tariffs on U.S. goods to 10% while the U.S. agreed to cut tariffs on Chinese goods to 30% for 90 days. Trump also issued Executive Order 14298, which reduced the tariff on Chinese de minimis shipments from 120% to 54%. The following day, on May 13, the S&P 500 turned positive for the year.

On July 2, 2025, Trump said he had reached an agreement with Vietnam. However, Vietnam was reportedly surprised by the announcement and did not confirm the terms announced. In late July, Trump reduced the tariff rate on imports from Vietnam from 46% to 20%. In October 2025, both countries announced that duties on certain to-be-decided products will be lifted. In return, Vietnam committed to offering "preferential access" for most all U.S. goods.

== Resumption of country-specific tariffs ==
A map of countries by current confirmed total tariffs. Note that this map may be updated at any time. Last updated on August 6, 2025.: 50% or higher; 40% – 49%; 30% – 39%; 20% – 29%; 10% – 19% United States/Exempt

Although the pause on country-specific "reciprocal tariffs" was set to expire on July 8, 2025, two days before the deadline the administration delayed again to August 1. On July 7, 2025, Trump signed Executive Order 14316, Extending the Modification of the Reciprocal Tariff Rates.

Trump began sending letters to foreign governments, notifying them that new tariff rates would take effect on August 1 unless they reached a deal with the United States.

In a letter to Brazil, Trump threatened a 50% tariff while criticizing the trial of Jair Bolsonaro, an ally of his charged with participating in a 2022 coup attempt. He eventually imposed a 40% tariff after declaring a "national emergency" in the U.S. caused by Brazil's policies, in addition to a 10% "reciprocal" tariff. Brazilian President Lula da Silva said his government would respond with retaliatory tariffs of equivalent value, having been authorized to do so by a Brazilian bill passed shortly after Liberation Day. Other executive orders added a 30% tariff to imports from Mexico and 35% to those from Canada. India received a 25% tariff as a penalty for its purchases of Russian oil, in addition to its 25% "reciprocal" tariff.

Trump announced five additional deals by the new deadline. Indonesia received a reduction from 32% to 19%, and the Philippines negotiated a cut from 20% to 19%, while both agreed to drop tariffs on U.S. goods to 0%. Japan, South Korea, and the EU received a 15% tariff after pledging to buy or invest billions in the US. The frameworks for these deals were unclear. The EU said their agreement was not legally binding and that while Trump said they had pledged $600 billion in private investments, the EU lacked the authority to enforce that commitment.

On July 31, 2025, Trump signed Executive Order, Further Modifying the Reciprocal Tariff Rates, which ordered that country-specific "reciprocal" tariffs resume on August 7 instead of August 1 as expected. The new tariff rates took effect on August 7, raising the US average effective tariff rate to over 17% and the highest since the Great Depression according to a Yale research lab.

== Legal challenges ==
At least seven cases were filed in American federal courts challenging Trump's authority to impose tariffs under IEEPA. Central to each case is the argument that the imposition of tariffs, in the absence of clear congressional authorization, may constitute an overextension of executive power into areas that are traditionally reserved for the legislative branch. Several complaints invoke the nondelegation doctrine, asserting that the IEEPA, as applied, grants the executive branch an excessively broad scope of discretion. In addition to constitutional claims, the cases highlight significant economic consequences for states, businesses, and individuals, emphasizing the potential for such executive action to set a precedent for expansive policymaking beyond the intended purpose of emergency economic legislation.

On May 28, 2025, the United States Court of International Trade (CIT) issued a summary judgment for V.O.S. Selections, Inc. v. United States and Oregon v. Department of Homeland Security and ruled Trump had exceeded his authority under the IEEPA. According to Thomson Reuters, the CIT found the IEEPA tariffs "illegal because the triggering emergency (fentanyl trafficking and trade deficits) bore no rational connection to the trade measures imposed." In Learning Resources, Inc. v. Trump, a Washington D.C. district court went further by holding that the IEEPA does not authorize tariffs at all. The United States Court of Appeals for the Federal Circuit upheld the CIT's decision on August 29, 2025. The rulings were stayed pending appeal, allowing the tariffs to remain in effect.

The Supreme Court consolidated V.O.S. Selections and Learning Resources into a single case. In February 2026, the Supreme Court affirmed the decision of the appeals court that Trump's use of emergency powers to enact the tariffs was not legal. The government estimated that it collected $166 billion from more than 330,000 businesses in IEEPA tariffs that the Supreme Court found unconstitutional and U.S. customs is working on a system to process refunds of these tariffs. The Guardian reported that $81 billion of tariff refunds had been paid up to June 2026, according to interim Treasury department budget returns.

== See also ==
- Tariff of Abominations – 1828 United States tariff
- Smoot–Hawley Tariff Act – 1930 U.S. law which raised import duties
- Trump Always Chickens Out – Phrase describing policies of the Trump administration
