= Small business =

Business with fewer employees or revenue

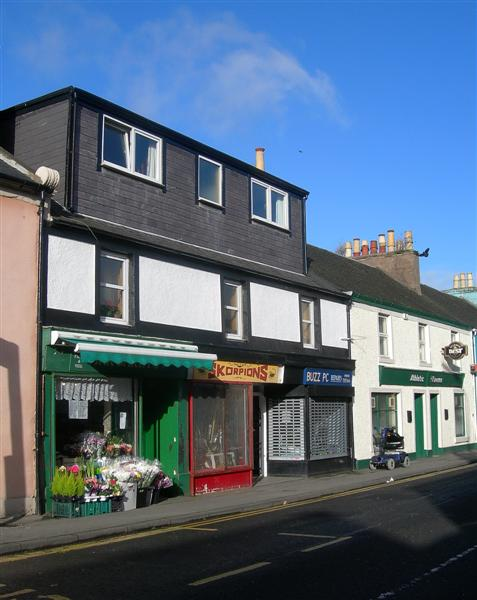
Small businesses on Dalrymple Street in Girvan, Scotland

Small businesses are types of corporations, partnerships, or sole proprietorships which have a small number of employees or less annual revenue than a regular-sized business or corporation. Businesses are defined as "small" in terms of being able to apply for government support and qualify for preferential tax policy. The qualifications vary depending on the country and industry. Small businesses range from fifteen employees under the Australian Fair Work Act 2009, fifty employees according to the definition used by the European Union, and fewer than five hundred employees to qualify for many U.S. Small Business Administration programs. While small businesses can be classified according to other methods, such as annual revenues, shipments, sales, assets, annual gross, net revenue, net profits, the number of employees is one of the most extensively used measures.

Small businesses in many countries include service or retail operations such as convenience stores or tradespeople. Some professionals operate as small businesses, such as lawyers, accountants, or medical doctors (although these professionals can also work for large organizations or companies). Small businesses vary a great deal in terms of size, revenues, and regulatory authorization, both within a country and from country to country. Some small businesses, such as a home accounting business, may only require a business license. On the other hand, other small businesses, such as day cares, retirement homes, and restaurants serving liquor are more heavily regulated and may require inspection and certification from various government authorities.

== Characteristics ==
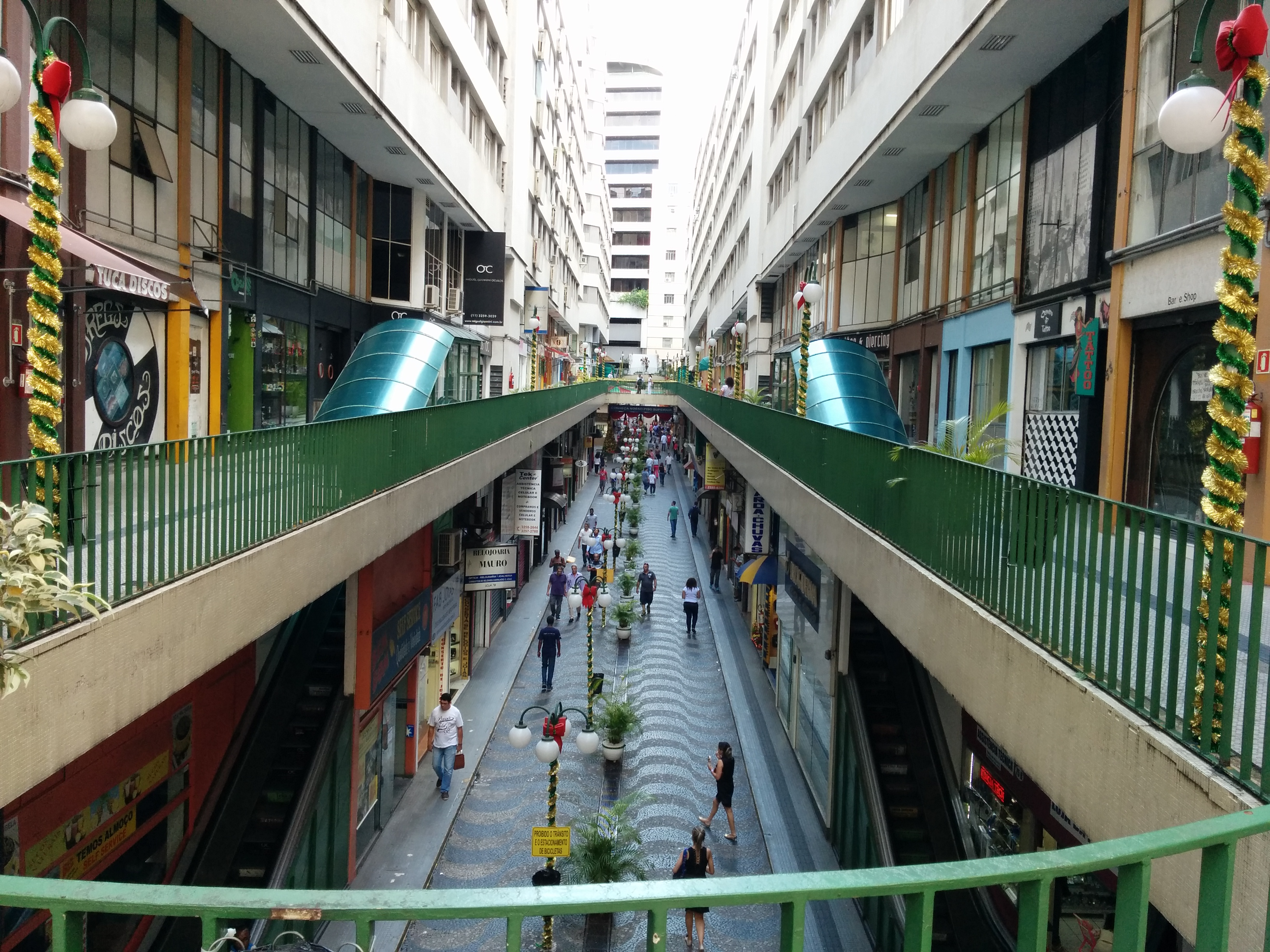
Small businesses in the Central Zone of São Paulo

Researchers and analysts of small or owner-managed businesses generally behave as if nominal organizational forms (e.g., partnership, sole-trader, or corporation), and the consequent legal and accounting boundaries of owner-managed firms are consistently meaningful. However, owner-managers often do not distinguish between their personal and business interests. Lenders also often skirt organizational (corporate) boundaries by seeking personal guarantees or accepting privately held assets as collateral. Because of this behavior, researchers and analysts may wish to be cautious in assessing the organizational types and implied boundaries relating to owner-managed firms. This includes the analysis of traditional accounting disclosures and studies that treat the firm as defined by a formal organizational structure.

=== Concepts of small business, self-employment, entrepreneurship, and startup ===
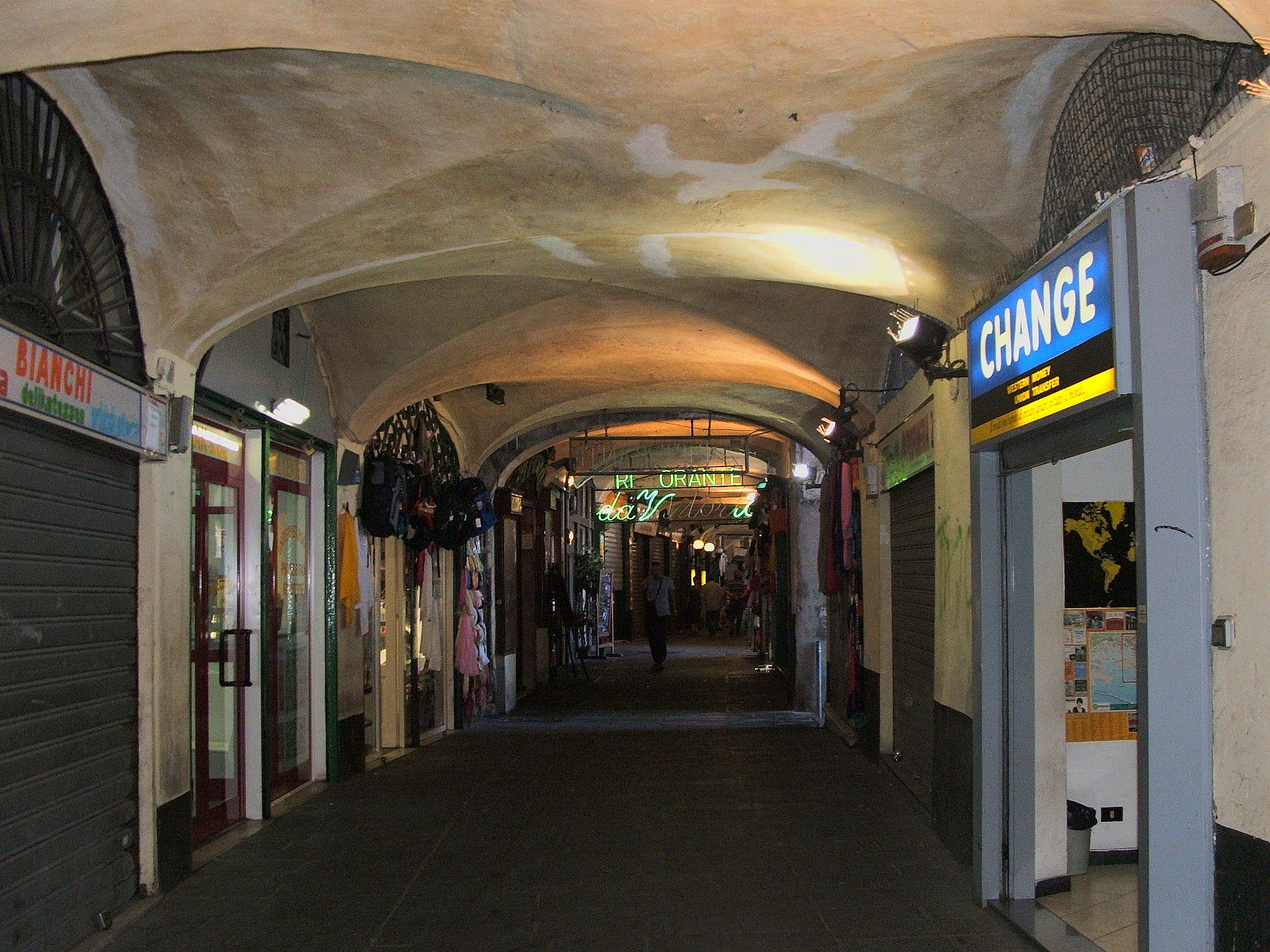
Portici di Sottoripa, Genoa, Italy. Galleries tend to form clusters of small business owners over time.

The concepts of small business, self-employment, entrepreneurship, and startup overlap but carry important distinctions. These four concepts are often conflated. Their key differences can be summarized as:

- self-employment: an organization created primarily to provide income to the founders, i.e. sole proprietor operations.
- entrepreneurship: all new organizations.
- startup: a new organization created to grow (and have employees).
- small business: an organization that is small (in employees or revenue) and may or may not have the intention to grow.

Many small businesses are sole proprietor operations consisting only of the owner, but many have additional employees. Some small businesses that offer a product, process or service, do not have growth as their primary objective. In contrast, a business that is created to become a big firm is known as a startup. Startups aim for growth and often offer an innovative product, process, or service. The entrepreneurs of startups typically aim to scale up the company by adding employees, seeking international sales, and so on, a process which is often but not always financed by venture capital and angel investments. Well-known examples of startups that grew into large companies include Microsoft, Genentech, and Federal Express.

Self-employment provides work primarily for the founders. Entrepreneurship refers to all new businesses, including self-employment and businesses that never intend to grow large or become registered, whereas startups refer to new businesses that intend to grow beyond the founders, have employees, and become large.

=== Size definitions ===
The legal definition of "small business" varies by country and by industry. In addition to the number of employees, methods used to classify small companies include annual sales (turnover), the value of assets and net profit (balance sheet), alone or as a combination of factors.

- In India, all the manufacturing and service enterprises having investment "Not more than Rs 10 crore" and Annual Turnover "not more than Rs 50 crore" come under this category.
- In Canada, ISED (Innovation Science and Economic Development Canada) classisfies employer businesses according to their number of paid employees. Small businesses have 1-99 employess, medium-sized businesses have 100 to 499 employees and large businesses have 500 or more employees. Within this classification, micro-enterprises are businesses with 1to 4 paid employees. As of December 2024, micro-enterprises represented 59.1% of Canadaian employer businesses.
- In the United States, the Small Business Administration establishes small business size standards on an industry-by-industry basis but generally specifies a small business as having fewer than 500 employees for manufacturing businesses and less than $7.5 million in annual receipts for most non-manufacturing businesses. The definition can vary by circumstance—for example, a small business having fewer than 25 full-time equivalent employees with average annual wages below $50,000 qualifies for a tax credit under the health care reform bill Patient Protection and Affordable Care Act. By comparison, a medium-sized business or mid-sized business has fewer than 500 employees.
- The European Union generally defines a small business as one that has fewer than fifty employees and either turnover or balance sheet less than €10 m. but the European Commission is undertaking a review of this definition. By comparison, a medium-sized business has fewer than 250 employees and either turnover less than €50 m. or balance sheet less than €43 m.
- In Australia, a small business is defined by the Fair Work Act 2009 as one with fewer than 15 employees, although the Australian Bureau of Statistics uses less than 20 employees as its threshold. By comparison, a medium-sized business or mid-sized business has fewer than two hundred employees.
- In South Africa, the National Small Business Amendment Act (Act 26 of 2003) defines businesses in a variety of ways using five categories previously established by the National Small Business Act (Act 102 of 1996), namely, standard industrial sector and subsector classification, size of class, equivalent of paid employees, turnover and asset value excluding fixed property.

Small businesses usually do not dominate their field.

The following table serves as a guide to business size nomenclature.

Business size definitions (by number of employees)
Size	AUS	US	CAN	EU
Minute/micro	1–2	1–6	1–4	<10
Small	<15	<500	<100	<50
Medium	<200	<500	<500	<250
Large	<500	<1000	>500	<1000
Enterprise	>500	>1000	N/A	>1000

- Most cells reflect sizes not defined in legislation.
- Some definitions are multi-parameter, e.g., by industry, revenue, or market share.

=== Demographics ===
In 2016 a study that examined the demographic of small business owners was published. The study showed that the median American small business owners were above the age of 50. The ages were distributed as 51% over 50 years old, 33% between the ages of 35 and 49, and 16% being under the age of 35. As for sex: 55% were owned by males, 36% by females, and 9% being equal ownership of both males and females. As for race: 72% were white/Caucasian, 13.5% were Latinos, 6.3% were African American, 6.2% were Asian, and 2% as other. As for educational background: 39% had obtained a bachelor's degree or higher, 33% had some college background, and 28% received at least a high school diploma.

The United States census data for the years 2014 and 2015 shows women’s ownership share of small businesses by firm size. The data explains the percentages owned by women along with the number of employees, including the owner. Generally, the smaller the business, the more likely it is to be owned by a woman. The data shows that about 22% of small businesses with 100–500 employees were owned by women, and this percentage rises as the business size decreases. About 41% of businesses with just 2–4 employees were run by women, and in businesses with only one person, that person was a woman in 51% of cases.

=== Franchise businesses ===
Franchising is a way for small business owners to benefit from the economies of scale of the big corporation (franchiser). McDonald's and Subway are examples of a franchise. The small business owner can leverage a strong brand name and purchasing power of the larger company while keeping their own investment affordable. However, some franchisees conclude that they suffer the "worst of both worlds" feeling they are too restricted by corporate mandates and lack true independence. It is an assumption that small business is just franchisees, but the truth is many franchisers are also small businesses. Although considered to be a successful way of doing business, literature has proved that there is a high failure rate in franchising as well, especially in the UK, where research indicates that out of 1658 franchising companies operating in 1984, only 601 remained in 1998, a mere 36%.

=== Retailers' cooperative ===
A retailers' cooperative is a type of cooperative that employs economies of scale on behalf of its retailer members. Retailers' cooperatives use their purchasing power to acquire discounts from manufacturers and often share marketing expenses. They are often recognized as "local groups" because they own their own stores within the community. It is common for locally owned grocery stores, hardware stores, and pharmacies to participate in retailers' cooperatives. Ace Hardware, True Value, and NAPA are examples of a retailers' cooperative. Retail cooperatives allow consumers to supply their own earnings and gain bargaining power outside of the business sector. Retail cooperatives mainly reside within small communities where local businesses are often shut down.

== Advantages and disadvantages ==
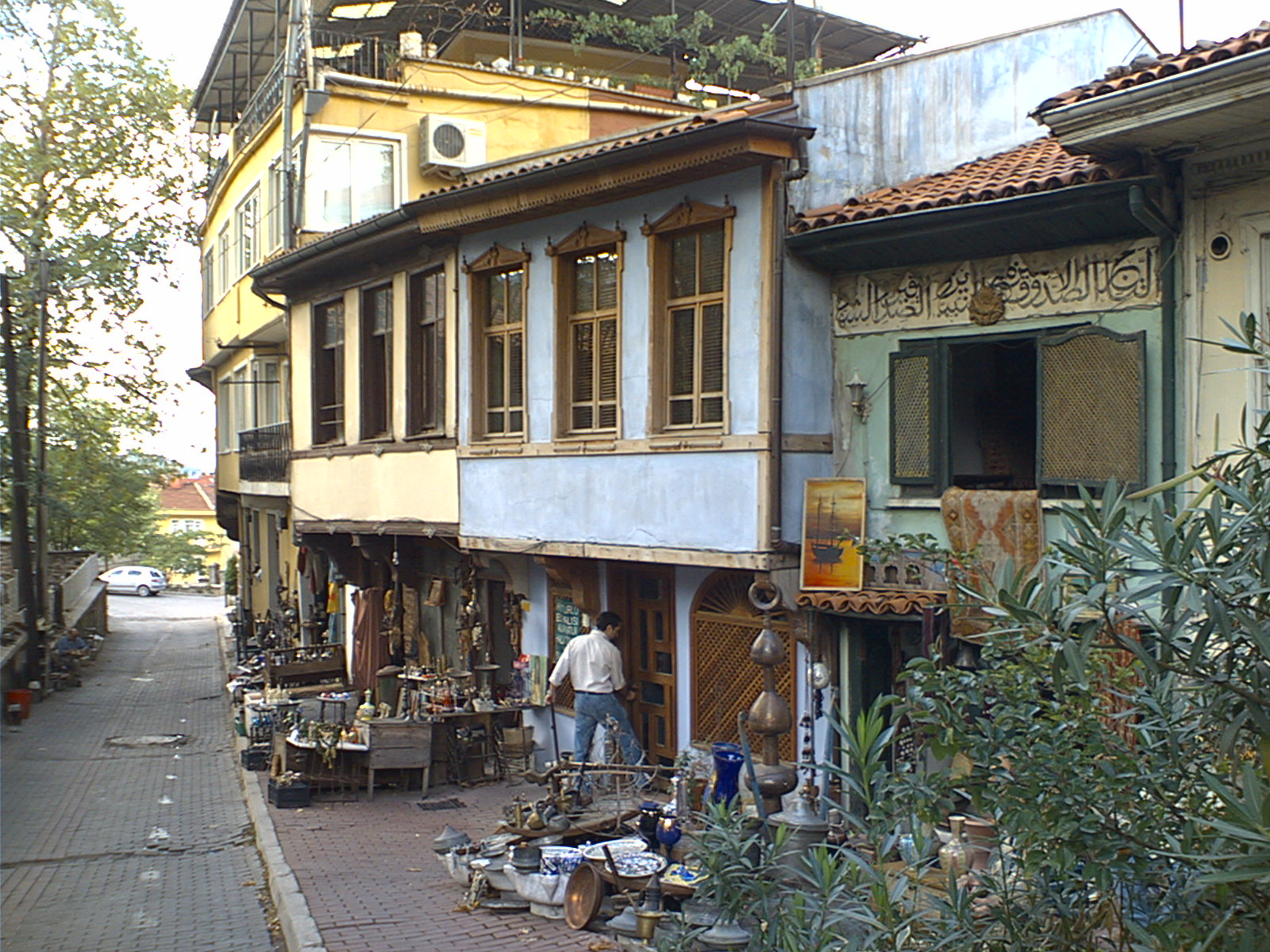
Small business in Bursa, Turkey. One of the claimed advantages of small business owners is the ability to serve market niches not served by mass production industries. Consider how few major corporations would be willing to deal with the risks and uncertainty that small antique store deals with buying and selling non-standardized items and making quick assessments of the value of rare items.

Many small businesses can be started at a low cost and on a part-time basis, while a person continues a regular job with an employer or provides care for family members in the home. In developing countries, many small businesses are sole-proprietor operations such as selling products at a market stall or preparing hot food to sell on the street, which provide a small income. In the 2000s, a small business was well suited to Internet marketing; because, it can easily serve specialized niches, something that would have been more difficult before the Internet revolution which began in the late 1990s. Internet marketing gives small businesses the ability to market with smaller budgets. Adapting to change is crucial in business and particularly small business; not being tied to the bureaucratic inertia associated with large corporations, small businesses can respond to changing marketplace demand more quickly. Small business proprietors tend to be in closer personal contact with their customers and clients than large corporations, as small business owners see their customers in person each week.

One study showed that small, local businesses are better for a local economy than the introduction of new chain stores. By opening up new national level chain stores, the profits of locally owned businesses greatly decrease and many businesses end up failing and having to close. This creates an exponential effect. When one store closes, people lose their jobs, other businesses lose business from the failed business, and so on. In many cases, large firms displace just as many jobs as they create.

A disadvantage of having a small business is the challenge of finding and keeping talented employees. Small tech companies have difficulty in retention when larger companies are interested in the same talent. Workers can be acquired from out of country but strict immigration rules are limiting.

=== Independence ===
Independence is another advantage of owning a small business. A small business owner does not have to report to a supervisor, manager, or a board to report to, which is the situation for a corporation's CEO. Many people desire to make their own decisions, take their own risks, and reap the rewards of their efforts. Small business owners possess the flexibility and freedom to make their own decisions within the constraints imposed by economic and other environmental factors. However, entrepreneurs have to work for very long hours and understand that ultimately their customers are their bosses.

Small businesses (often carried out by family members) may adjust more quickly to changing conditions; however, they may also be closed to the absorption of new knowledge and employing new labor from outside.

=== Financial reporting ===
Small businesses benefit from less extensive accounting and financial reporting requirements than those faced by larger businesses.

The European Union's Directive on annual financial statements of 2013 aims to "limit administrative burdens and provide for simple and robust accounting rules, especially for small and medium-sized enterprises (SMEs)". In the UK, the Companies, Partnerships and Groups (Accounts and Reports) Regulations 2015 transposed the EU Directive into UK law and amended the reporting regime for reduced disclosure accounts for any accounting period commencing on or after 1 January 2016. "Abbreviated accounts" were permitted for smaller entities under "FRSSE", the Financial Reporting Standard for Smaller Entities. Until 2015, companies deemed small under the UK Companies Act 2006 were allowed to use this standard. For accounting years ending on or after 1 January 2016, FRSSE is no longer available, but there are options known as "abridged accounts" and "filleted accounts":

- Abridged accounts: accounting for profit / loss begins with the declaration of gross profit or loss, not turnover
- Filleted financial statements or filleted accounts: profit and loss accounts are excluded, but balance sheet and balance sheet notes are to be disclosed.

Alternatively, the smallest companies are able to file "micro-entity accounts". FRS 105 is a Financial Reporting Standard applicable to the Micro-entities Regime.

== Challenges ==
Small businesses often face a variety of problems, some of which are related to their size. A frequent cause of bankruptcy is under capitalization. This is often a result of poor planning rather than economic conditions. It is a common rule of thumb that the entrepreneur should have access to a sum of money at least equal to the projected revenue for the first year of business in addition to the anticipated expenses. For example, prospective owners anticipating 100,000 in revenue the first year with 150,000 in start up expenses should have at least 250,000 available. Start-up expenses are often grossly underestimated adding to the burden of the business. Failure to provide this level of funding for the company could leave the owner liable for all of the company's debt in bankruptcy court under the theory of undercapitalization. Start-up businesses are often faced with reduced or no credit terms from suppliers due to lack of funds or trading history.

In addition to ensuring that the business has enough capital, the small business owner must be mindful of contribution margin (sales minus variable costs). To break even, the business must be able to reach a level of sales where the contribution margin equals fixed costs. When they first start, many small business owners underprice their products to a point where even at their maximum capacity, it would be impossible to break even. Cost controls or price increases often resolve this problem.

In the United States, some of the largest concerns of small business owners are insurance costs (such as liability and health), energy costs, taxes, and tax compliance. In the United Kingdom and Australia, small business owners tend to be more concerned with perceived excessive governmental red tape.

Contracting fraud has been an ongoing problem for small businesses in the United States. Small businesses are legally obligated to receive a fair portion (23 per cent) of the total value of all the government's prime contracts as mandated by the Small Business Act of 1953. Since 2002, a series of federal investigations have found fraud, abuse, loopholes, and a lack of oversight in federal small business contracting, which has led to the diversion of billions of dollars in small business contracts to large corporations.

Another problem for many small businesses is termed the 'Entrepreneurial Myth' or E-Myth. The mythic assumption is that an expert in a given technical field will be an expert at running that kind of business. Additional business management skills are needed to keep a business running smoothly. Some of this misunderstanding arises from the failure to distinguish between small business managers as entrepreneurs or capitalists. While nearly all owner-managers of small firms are obliged to assume the role of capitalist, only a minority will act as entrepreneurs. The line between an owner-manager and an entrepreneur can be defined by whether or not their business is growth-oriented. In general, small business owners are primarily focused on surviving rather than growing; therefore, not experiencing the five stages of the corporate life cycle (birth, growth, maturity, revival, and decline) as an entrepreneur would.

Another problem for many small businesses is the capacity of much larger businesses to influence or sometimes determine their chances for success. Business networking and social media has been used as a major tool by small businesses in the UK, but most of them just use a "scattergun" approach in a desperate attempt to exploit the market which is not that successful. Over half of small firms lack a business plan, a tool that is considered one of the most important factors for a venture's success. Business planning is associated with improved growth prospects. Funders and investors usually require a business plan. A plan also serves as a strategic planning document for owners and CEOs, which can be used as a "bible" for decision-making.

An international trade survey indicated that the British share of businesses that are exporting rose from 32% in 2012 to 39% in 2013. Although this may seem positive, in reality, the growth is slow, as small business owners shy away from exporting due to actual and perceived barriers. Learning the basics of a foreign language could be the solution to open doors to new trade markets, it is a reality that not all foreign business partners speak English. China is stated to grow by 7.6% in 2013 and still, 95% of business owners who want to export to China have no desire and no knowledge to learn their local language.

=== Bankruptcy ===
When the small business fails, the owner may file for bankruptcy. In most cases, this can be handled through a personal bankruptcy filing. Corporations can file bankruptcy, but if it is out of business and valuable corporate assets are likely to be repossessed by secured creditors, there is little advantage to going to the expense of a corporate bankruptcy. Many states offer exemptions for small business assets so they can continue to operate during and after personal bankruptcy. However, corporate assets are normally not exempt; hence, it may be more difficult to continue operating an incorporated business if the owner files bankruptcy. Researchers have examined small business failures in some depth, with attempts to model the predictability of failure. (Note: A list of examples is available at ICSB.)

=== Social responsibility ===
Small businesses can encounter several problems related to engaging in corporate social responsibility, due to characteristics inherent in their size. Owners of small businesses often participate heavily in the day-to-day operations of their companies. This results in a lack of time for the owner to coordinate socially responsible efforts, such as supporting local charities or not-for-profit activities. Additionally, a small business owner's expertise often falls outside the realm of socially responsible practices, which can contribute to a lack of participation. Small businesses also face a form of peer pressure from larger forces in their respective industries, making it difficult to oppose and work against industry expectations. Furthermore, small businesses undergo stress from shareholder expectations. Because small businesses have more personal relationships with their patrons and local shareholders, they must be prepared to withstand closer scrutiny if they want to share in the benefits of committing to socially responsible practices or not.

=== Job quality ===
According to the U.S. Small Business Administration Office of Advocacy's 2026 FAQ, small businesses employ 62.3 million people, or 45.9 percent of U.S. private-sector workers. While small businesses have been established as a main driving force behind job creation, the quality of the jobs these businesses create has been called into question. Small businesses generally employ individuals from the Secondary labor market. As a result, in the U.S., wages are 49% higher for employees of large firms. Additionally, many small businesses struggle or are unable to provide employees with benefits they would be given at larger firms. Research from the U.S. Small Business Administration indicates that employees of large firms are 17% more likely to receive benefits including salary, paid leave, paid vacation, bonuses, insurance, and retirement plans. Both lower wages and fewer benefits combine to create a job turnover rate among U.S. small businesses that is three times higher than large firms. Employees of small businesses must adapt to the higher failure rate of small firms, which means that they are more likely to lose their job due to the firm going under. In the U.S. 69% of small businesses last at least two years, but this percentage drops to 51% for firms reaching five years in operation. The U.S. Small Business Administration counts companies with as much as $35.5 million in sales and 1,500 employees as "small businesses", depending on the industry. Outside government, companies with less than $7 million in sales and fewer than five hundred employees are widely considered small businesses.

=== Cyber crime ===
Cybercrime in the business world can be broken down into 4 main categories. They include loss of reputation and consumer confidence, cost of fixing the issue, loss of capital and assets, and legal difficulties that can come from these problems. Loss of reputation and consumer confidence can be impacted greatly after one attack. Many small businesses will struggle to gain confidence and trust in their customers after being known for having problems prior. The cost of fixing the cyber attack would require experts outside of their field to further the investigation and find the problem. Being down for a business means losing money at the same time. This could halt the online operations and mean the business could potentially be down for a long period of time. Loss of capital and assets ties well in with the cost of fixing the issue. During a cyberattack, a business may lose its funds for that business. Worst-case scenario, a business may actually lose all its working capital and funds. The legal difficulties involved with cybercrime can become pricy and hurt the business itself for not having standard security measures and standards. Security not only for the business but more importantly the customer should be the number one priority when dealing with security protocol.

The monetary dollar damage caused by cybercrime in 2016 equaled out to be over 1.33 billion dollars in the United States alone. In 2016, California alone had over 255 million dollars reported to the IC3. Certain cyber attacks can vary on how long it takes to solve a problem. It can take upwards to 69 days for an average everyday attack on a business. The types of attacks include viruses and malware issues. Employee activities within the workspace can also render a cyber attack. Employees using mobile devices or remote work access off the job makes it easier for a cyber attack to occur.

=== Sensitivity to tariffs ===
Tariffs introduce added unpredictability into the daily operations of a small business. Small businesses are especially vulnerable to these tariff related price swings and variations. Their smaller budgets leave them in a position where even modest price changes, especially when unpredictable, can lead to small businesses declaring bankruptcy whereas some larger businesses are better prepared to weather some tariff induced supply chain shocks.

According to reporting from The Wall Street Journal, small businesses are especially at risk of being harmed by tariffs and trade restrictions. The main risk being that, "Unlike larger companies, small businesses have fewer levers to pull to help them endure the new tariff regime. Most work with a single factory or a handful of suppliers, making switching production to lower-tariff countries especially difficult. Smaller margins, thinner cash cushions and tiny staffs leave them more vulnerable to trade battles and other economic storms." In 2025 this was especially a concern related to president Donald Trump's Liberation Day tariffs, which, after having been announced on April 2, 2025 resulted in a global stock market collapse, layoffs, and global economic turmoil. Ronak Trivedi was quoted as having said, "...we are going to see a massive round of layoffs and shutdowns." The Liberty Justice Center, a public-interest law firm, sued the Trump administration in V.O.S. Selections, Inc. v. Trump in a case filed on April 14, 2025. The case revolves around small businesses that had their entire business model potentially upended and risked closing entirely after the executive action issued by President Trump and his potentially unconstitutional tariffs.

The U.S. Chamber of Commerce has asserted that, "Small businesses do not have the margin or capital reserves to sustain...increased tariffs, nor do they have the ability to quickly modify supply chains."

== Marketing ==
Although small businesses have close relationships with their existing customers, finding new customers and reaching new markets is a major challenge for small business owners. Small businesses typically find it difficult to find time for marketing, as they have to run the day-to-day aspects of the business. To create a continual stream of new business and find new clients and customers, they must work on marketing their business continuously. Low sales (the result of poor marketing) is one of the primary reasons for small business failure. Common marketing techniques for small business include business networking (e.g., attending Chamber of Commerce events or trade fairs), "word of mouth" promotion by existing customers, customer referrals, Yellow pages directories, television, radio, and outdoor ads (e.g., roadside billboards), print ads, email, and Internet marketing. TV ads can be expensive, so they are normally intended to create awareness of a product or service. Another means by which small businesses can advertise is through the use of "deal of the day" websites such as Groupon and Living Social. These Internet deals encourage customers to patronize small businesses.

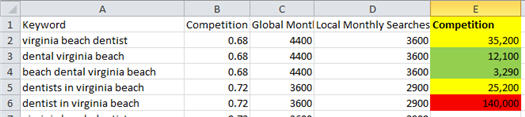
Example of keyword analysis based on market competition

Social media has become a marketing channel for small businesses. Statistically, social media marketing has higher lead-to-close rates than traditional media. Small business marketers use relevant keywords in their website content.

In addition to the social networking sites, blogs have become an effective way for small businesses to position themselves as experts on issues regarding their customers. This can be done with a proprietary blog or by using a back-link strategy wherein the marketer comments on other blogs and leaves a link to the small business's own website.

Marketing plan

- Market research – To produce a marketing plan for small businesses, research needs to be done on similar businesses, which should include desk research (done online or with directories) and field research. This gives an insight into the target group's behavior and shopping patterns. Analyzing the competitor's marketing strategies makes it easier for small businesses to gain market share.
- Marketing mix – Marketing mix is a crucial factor for any business to be successful. Especially for a small business, examining a competitor's marketing mix can be very helpful. An appropriate market mix, which uses different types of marketing, can help to boost sales.
- Product life cycle – After the launch of the business, crucial points of focus should be the growth phase (adding customers, adding products or services or expanding to new markets) and working towards the maturity phase. Once the business reaches the maturity stage, an extension strategy should be in place. Re-launching is also an option at this stage. Pricing strategy should be flexible and based on the different stages of the product life cycle.
- Promotion techniques – It is preferable to keep promotion expenses as low as possible. ‘Word of mouth’, ‘email marketing’, ‘print-ads’ in local newspapers, etc. can be effective.
- Channels of distribution – Selecting an effective channel of distribution may reduce the promotional expenses as well as overall expenses for a small business.

== Contribution to the economy ==
In 2026, the U.S. Small Business Administration Office of Advocacy's 2026 FAQ reports 36,207,130 small businesses in the United States, representing 99.9 percent of businesses. It reports that small businesses account for 38.7 percent of private-sector payroll. The FAQ cites a study estimating that small businesses accounted for 43.5 percent of private nonfarm gross domestic product in 2014. Regarding small business, the top job provider is those with fewer than ten employees, and those with ten or more but fewer than twenty employees comes in as the second, and those with twenty or more but fewer than one hundred employees comes in as the third (interpolation of data from the following references). The most recent data shows firms with fewer than twenty employees account for slightly more than 18% of the employment.

According to "The Family Business Review", "there are approximately seventeen million sole-proprietorship in the US. It can be argued that a sole-proprietorship (an unincorporated business owned by a single person) is a type of family business" and "there are twenty-two million small businesses (fewer than five hundred employees) in the US and approximately 14,000 big businesses". It has been found that small businesses created the newest jobs in communities, "In 1979, David Birch published the first empirical evidence that small firms (fewer than 100 employees) created the newest jobs", and Edmiston claimed that "perhaps the greatest generator of interest in entrepreneurship and small business is the widely held belief that small businesses in the United States create most new jobs. The evidence suggests that small businesses indeed create a substantial majority of net new jobs in an average year." The U.S. Small Business Administration has found small businesses have created two-thirds of net new private-sector jobs in the US since 2007. Local businesses provide competition to each other and challenge corporate giants. Of the 5,369,068 employer firms in 1995, 78.8 per cent had fewer than ten employees, and 99.7 per cent had fewer than five hundred employees.

== Sources of funding ==
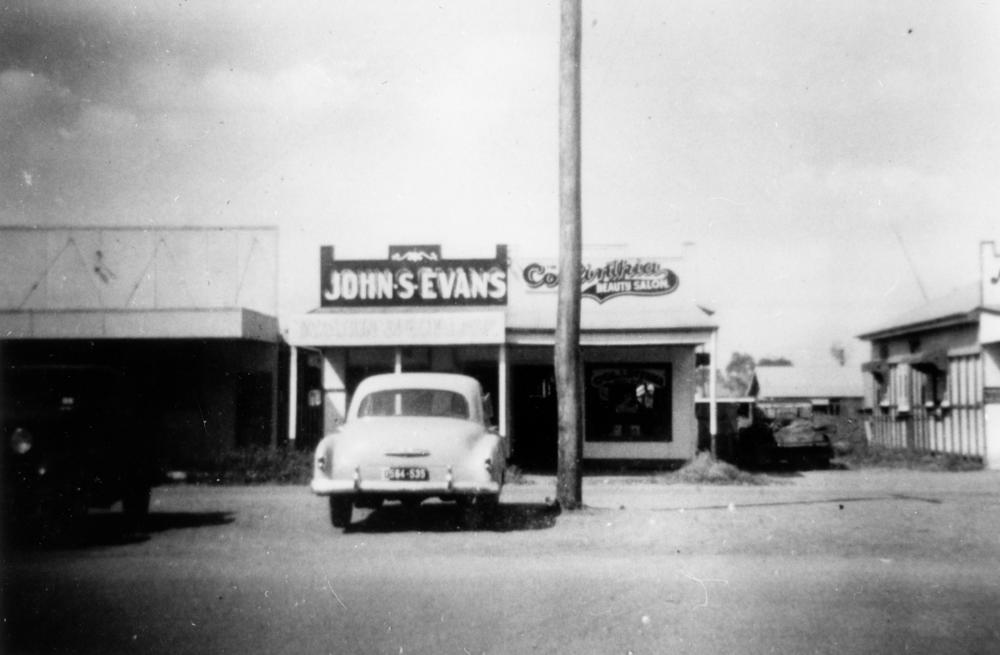
Small businesses in Biloela, Central Queensland, Australia, 1949

Small businesses use various sources available for start-up capital:

- Self-financing by the owner through cash savings, equity loan on his or her home, and or other assets
- Loans or financial gifts from friends or relatives
- Grants from private foundations, government, or other sources
- Private stock issue
- Forming partnerships
- Angel investors
- Loans from banks, credit unions, or other financial institutions
- SME finance, including collateral-based lending and venture capital, given sufficiently sound business venture plans

Some small businesses are further financed through credit card debt—usually a risky choice, given that the interest rate on credit cards is often several times the rate that would be paid on a line of credit at a bank or a bank loan and terms can change unpredictably. Recent research suggests that the use of credit scores in small business lending by community banks is surprisingly widespread. Moreover, the scores employed tend to be the consumer credit scores of the small business owners rather than the more encompassing small business credit scores that include data on the firms as well as on the owners. Many owners seek a bank loan in the name of their business; however, banks will usually insist on a personal guarantee by the business owner.

In October 2010, Alejandro Cremades and Tanya Prive founded the first equity crowdfunding platform for small businesses in history as an alternative source of financing. The platform operates under the name of Rock The Post.

== Government support ==
Several organizations in the United States provide help for the small business sector, such as the Internal Revenue Service's Small Business and Self-Employed One-Stop Resource. The Small Business Administration (SBA) runs several loan programs that may help a small business secure loans. In these programs, the SBA guarantees a portion of the loan to the issuing bank, and thus, relieves the bank of some of the risk of extending the loan to a small business. The SBA requires business owners to pledge personal assets and sign as a personal guarantee for the loan. The 8(a) Business Development Program assists in the development of small businesses owned and operated by African Americans, Hispanics, and Asians.

Canadian small businesses can take advantage of federally funded programs and services. See Federal financing for small businesses in Canada (grants and loans).

In Bulgaria, government support for small and medium-sized enterprises is handled via the Bulgarian Small and Medium Enterprises Promotion Agency (BSMEPA), based in Sofia.

In the United Kingdom, the Small Business Commissioner (SBC) provides information and advice for small businesses and deals with complaints resolution with specific reference to late payment problems and other unfavourable payment practices. The SBC's role is to make non-binding recommendations advising on how the parties can resolve a dispute.

Small businesses are encouraged per public policy on taxation. For example, from January 1, 2020, Armenia introduced a special micro-entrepreneurship tax system with a non-taxable base of 24 million AMD. Accordingly, a micro-business will be exempted from taxes other than income tax which will not exceed 5,000 AMD per employee.

== Business networks and advocacy groups ==
Small businesses often join or come together to form organizations to advocate for their causes or to achieve economies of scale that larger businesses benefit from, such as the opportunity to buy cheaper health insurance in bulk. There was a study research done between 1990 and 2002 about how relationships like partnerships and alliances can make a big difference for small businesses. They go deep into the three main ideas, of how a business owns its own resources help, how much they have to rely on outside help and how changes in these relationships affect the businesses. These organizations include local or regional groups such as Chambers of Commerce and independent business alliances, as well as national or international industry-specific organizations. Such groups often serve a dual purpose, as business networks to provide marketing and connect members to potential sales leads and suppliers, and as advocacy groups, bringing together many small businesses to provide a stronger voice in regional or national politics. In the case of independent business alliances, promoting the value of locally owned, independent business (not necessarily small) through public education campaigns is integral to their work.

The largest regional small business group in the United States is the Council of Smaller Enterprises, located in Greater Cleveland.

United Kingdom Trade and Investment gives out research in different markets around the world, and research in program planning and promotional activities to exporters. The BEXA's (British Exporters Association) role is to connect new exporters to expert services. It can provide details about regional export contacts, who could be made informally to discuss issues. Trade associations and all major banks often provide links to international groups in foreign markets, and some help set up joint ventures and trade fairs.

Several youth organizations, including 4-H, Junior Achievement, and Scouting, have interactive programs and training to help young people run their own small business under adult supervision.

== See also ==
- American Independent Business Alliance
- Big business
- Distributism
- Federation of Small Businesses
- Flex space
- Home business
- Independent telephone company
- Localism (politics) versus transnational corporations
- Market capitalization
- Micro-enterprise
- National Federation of Independent Business
- S corporation
- Small Business Administration
- Small Business Commissioner
- Small Business Innovation Research (SBIR)
- Small business software
- Small is Profitable
- Small office/home office
- Small-scale project management
- Small start units
