= National Right to Work Legal Defense Foundation =

Non-profit organization in the USA

- Type: 501(c)(3) organization
- Tax ID no.: 59-1588825
- Purpose: Advancing right-to-work laws in the U.S.
- Headquarters: 8001 Braddock Road, Springfield, Virginia 22160
- President: Mark A. Mix
- Revenue: $7.92 million (2025)
- Expenses: $7.37 million (2025)
- Staff: 44 (2025)
- Website: www.nrtw.org

The National Right to Work Legal Defense Foundation, established in 1968, is an American conservative nonprofit organization that seeks to advance right-to-work laws in the United States.

== History ==
National Right to Work Legal Defense Foundation (NRTW) was founded in 1968 to provide legal aid to employees who sought to fight compulsory union membership. The Foundation says it has represented "the rights of more than 20,000 employees in more than 2,500 cases" since its inception, including multiple U.S. Supreme Court cases. The legal activities of the Foundation are funded by charitable donations. The organization qualifies as a tax-exempt charitable foundation under section 501(c)(3) of the Internal Revenue Code.

The Foundation is headed by President Mark Mix. The legal activities are headed by Vice President and Legal Director, Raymond J. LaJeunesse Jr.

The National Right to Work Committee is a separate grassroots organization which advocates for right-to-work legislation and rallies public opposition to compulsory union membership.

== Mission ==
The mission of the NRTW is "to eliminate coercive union power and compulsory unionism abuses through strategic litigation, public information, and education programs." The Foundation believes workers should have the right to refuse to pay dues to a union while still receiving the benefits of union representation in collective bargaining and disciplinary matters. The Foundation's legal strategy includes "enforc[ing] employees' existing legal rights against forced unionism abuses; and [winning] new legal precedents expanding these rights and protections."

As of 2019, right-to-work laws are in effect and enforced in twenty-seven U.S. states and territories. This means workers in these states cannot be compelled to join a union or pay dues to a union as a condition of employment. Proponents of right to work laws argue they provide employees with freedom to choose whether to join a union or not and the right to refuse to pay dues to a union they do not support, while opponents argue they allow non-union members to "free load" on the work of the union, which is required to represent workers whether they are members of a union or not.

== Notable cases ==
The Foundation has been involved in several landmark cases regarding the right to work, compulsory unionism, and union dues.

- Abood v. Detroit Board of Education, 431 U.S. 209 (1977)- The U.S. Supreme Court found that forcing a public employee to pay union dues was not a violation of a union objector's First Amendment rights, but only so far as the dues were used for expenses related to collective bargaining. Unions may not use dues of union objectors to finance political or ideological activities.
- Chicago Teachers Union v. Hudson, 475 U.S. 292 (1986)- The Court established rules regarding the collection of agency fees from public employees who object to the union- 1) employees must be provided with a financial accounting of the forced dues, 2) employees are entitled to a prompt and impartial review of the accounting, and 3) amounts reasonably in dispute may be escrowed during said review.
- Lehnert v. Ferris Faculty Association, 500 U.S. 507 (1991)- The Court further expounded on the rules regarding agency fees to only include those activities "germane" to collective-bargaining activity, are justified by the government's interest in labor peace and avoiding "free riders", and do "not significantly add to the burdening of free speech that is inherent in allowance of an agency or union shop." Agency fees may include a pro rata share of otherwise chargeable expense related to the state and national union affiliate. These fees may not include other expenses not directly related to the employee's bargaining unit or contract ratification, such as litigation, lobbying, and public relations.
- Davenport v. Washington Education Association, 551 U.S. 177 (2007)- The Court unanimously upheld a Washington state law requiring affirmative consent from non-members of the union before using their agency fees for election-related activities.
- Knox v. SEIU, 567 U.S. 298 (2012)- Similarly to Davenport, unions must provide a Hudson notice of a special assessment or dues increase and must receive affirmative consent from non-members before collecting said assessment or dues increase.
- Harris v. Quinn, 573 U.S. ___ (2014)- In a 5–4 decision, the Court refused to extend Abood's reasoning to home care personal assistants paid by Medicaid. The court found that the reasoning used in Abood to justify requiring non-union members to pay agency fees does not extend to the personal assistants because they are not similarly situated to full-fledged state employees- they do not enjoy the benefits of state employment and their employment is controlled by the person to whom they provide aid, not the state. Therefore, the First Amendment rights of the personal assistants are abridged by being required to pay agency fees to a union they do not wish to join or support.
- Janus v. AFSCME, 585 U.S. ___ (2018)- Building on Harris and Knox, the Court found that the payment of agency fees to unions by workers who object to the union is a violation of their First Amendment rights. The court ruled that Abood had erroneously interpreted First Amendment principles and was not supportable by stare decisis. The Abood arguments in favor of labor peace and avoiding free loaders does not justify the infringement upon worker's First Amendment rights. The Court also affirmatively stated that public-sector unions may not deduct any fees from nonmember's paychecks without the worker affirmatively consenting to said fee.

== Post-Janus litigation ==
The Foundation is representing public-sector workers across the country in multiple lawsuits seeking to protect the right to refuse to financially support a union secured by Janus. Some states enacted legislation making it difficult for workers to leave a union by limiting opt-out windows and making it difficult for workers to learn of or assert their Janus rights. This spurred dozens of post-Janus lawsuits. The Foundation is representing workers in various lawsuits seeking refund of pre-Janus fees paid, challenging exclusive representation, and seeking to extend the above rights to private sector workers.

== List of U.S. Supreme Court cases ==
The Foundation has represented employees in the following cases decided by the Supreme Court of the United States:

- 1977 - Abood v. Detroit Board of Education, 431 U.S. 209
- 1984 - Ellis v. Railway Clerks, 466 U.S. 435
- 1985 - Pattern Makers v. NLRB, 473 U.S. 95
- 1986 - Teachers v. Hudson, 475 U.S. 292
- 1988 - Communications Workers of America v. Beck, 487 U.S. 735
- 1991 - Lehnert v. Ferris Faculty Association, 500 U.S. 507
- 1998 - Air Line Pilots v. Miller, 523 U.S. 866
- 1998 - Marquez v. Screen Actors, 525 U.S. 33
- 2007 - Davenport v. Washington Education Association, 551 U.S. 177
- 2008 - Locke v. Karass, 555 U.S. 207 (2009)
- 2012 - Knox v. SEIU, 567 U.S. 298 (2012)
- 2013 - Mulhall v. UNITE HERE, 571 US ___ (2013)
- 2014 - Harris v. Quinn, 573 U.S. ___ (2014)
- 2018 - Janus v. AFSCME, 585 U.S. ___ (2018)

== See also ==
- Art Wittich
- Dark Money (film)
- NGO Campaign
