= Knox v. Service Employees International Union, Local 1000 =

Diane Knox v. Service Employees International Union
- Supreme Court of the United States

Argued January 10, 2012 Decided June 21, 2012
- Full case name: Knox et al. v. Service Employees International Union, Local 1000
- Docket no.: 10-1121
- Citations: 567 U.S. 298 (more) 132 S. Ct. 2277; 183 L. Ed. 2d 281; 2012 U.S. LEXIS 4663
- Argument: Oral argument

Case history
- Prior: Petitioners granted summary judgment, Knox v. Westly, No. 2:05-cv-02198, 2008 WL 850128 (E.D. Cal. Mar. 28, 2008); reversed sub. nom., Knox v. California State Employees Ass'n, 628 F.3d 1115 (9th Cir. 2010); cert. granted, 564 U.S. 1035 (2011).

Holding
- The case is not moot, the First Amendment does not permit a public-sector union to impose a special assessment without the affirmative consent of a member upon whom it is imposed.

Court membership
- Chief Justice John Roberts Associate Justices Antonin Scalia · Anthony Kennedy; Clarence Thomas · Ruth Bader Ginsburg; Stephen Breyer · Samuel Alito; Sonia Sotomayor · Elena Kagan

Case opinions
- Majority: Alito, joined by Roberts, Scalia, Kennedy, Thomas
- Concurrence: Sotomayor (in judgment), joined by Ginsburg
- Dissent: Breyer, joined by Kagan

Laws applied
- U.S. Const. amend. I

Knox v. Service Employees International Union, 567 U.S. 298 (2012), is a United States constitutional law case. The United States Supreme Court held in a 7–2 decision that Dianne Knox and other non-members of the Service Employees International Union did not receive the required notice of a $12 million assessment the union charged them to raise money for the union's political fund. In a tighter 5–4 ruling, the court further held that the long-standing precedent, the First Amendment requirement that non-union members covered by union contracts be given the chance to "opt out" of special fees was insufficient. Setting new precedent, the majority ruled that non-members shall be sent notice giving them the option to opt into special fees.

== Background ==
Under Abood v. Detroit Board of Education (1977) states may allow unions to charge nonmember workers “fair share” fees to prevent the free rider problem of nonmembers benefiting from a union's collective bargaining gains. Nonmembers must annually opt out of paying full union membership dues after the union sends a Hudson notice of what portion of the dues is chargeable to collective bargaining costs. California is one of the states that allow for such an “agency shop”.

Arnold Schwarzenegger won a recall election against California Governor Gray Davis in November 2003. Governor Schwarzenegger then proposed a broad fiscal reform agenda and called a 2005 special election to pass several ballot proposition and initiative constitutional amendments. One of these, Proposition 75 would have required union nonmembers to affirmatively opt into paying full union dues instead of needing to opt out.

Service Employees International Union Local 1000 is the largest labor union in California, with bargaining rights for half of all California state employees. In June 2005 SEIU sent out its annual Hudson notice, giving nonmembers thirty days to opt out of union dues and only pay a fair share fee. Shortly after the opt out deadline expired SEIU mailed a notice to all workers announcing an emergency fee to build a “Political Fight Back Fund”. The fee was then automatically deducted from all workers’ subsequent paychecks until after the 2006 California gubernatorial election. On November 1, 2005, plaintiff state employees filed a class action lawsuit in Sacramento Federal District Court alleging SEIU's emergency fee compelled plaintiffs’ speech in violation of the First Amendment.

SEIU's Political Fight Back Fund along with an alliance of other public sector unions expended $24 million campaigning against Schwarzenegger's fiscal reform, with the California Teachers Association expending an additional $56 million and going so far as to mortgage its Sacramento headquarters to fund more campaign spending. Schwarzenegger likewise spent nearly $8 million of his own fortune campaigning. The tenor was highly divisive, with Schwarzenegger calling his opponents “stooges” and at one point Warren Beatty leading a bus full of public employees to follow the governor and shout down his events.

Proposition 75 and all Governor Schwarzenegger's other fiscal reform agenda initiatives were defeated by wide margins. It had been the most expensive election in California history. As the results came out in Sacramento the president of the California Professional Firefighters union waived a broom over his head while state employees chanted “sweep, sweep, sweep”.

In March 2008 District Court Judge Morrison England granted plaintiffs’ summary judgment against SEIU, finding it “hard to imagine” a clearer example of political purposes than when actually spending funds on an election campaign. On appeal the Ninth Circuit panel reversed and remanded with an order to grant summary judgment against plaintiffs, with former Chief Judge J. Clifford Wallace authoring a lengthy dissent. Plaintiffs petitioned the United States Supreme Court for a writ of certiorari and the petition was granted.

Plaintiffs then filed their opening brief. Instead of filing a reply brief, SEIU mailed a ten-page booklet to the 28,000 plaintiffs offering terms and conditions for a full refund, even including a $1 bill. SEIU then moved to dismiss the case as moot.

== Opinion of the Court ==
Writing for the Court in a 7-2 ruling, Justice Alito first finds the case is not moot. Alito disregards SEIU's refund offer, finding such maneuvering “must be viewed with a critical eye”. Furthermore, SEIU's refund offer contained so many “unnecessarily complicated” conditions and caveats that Alito feels it might still be improper. As such, Alito feels he must proceed to the constitutional question.

Alito begins by correlating First Amendment protection of compelled funding with compelled speech and compelled association. He reads precedent as allowing compulsory fees funding private speech only when a compelling state interest requires the comprehensive regulation of a mandatory association and the fees are necessary for the regulatory purpose.

Questioning the necessity of compulsory union fees Alito writes “acceptance of the free-rider argument as a justification for compelling nonmembers to pay a portion of union dues represents something of an anomaly—one that we have found to be justified by the interest in furthering “labor peace.” He finds this anomaly is “a remarkable boon for unions” and that it only came about as a “historical accident”.

Alito is unwilling to extend the anomaly of compelling ordinary union dues to further compelling extraordinary union fees. The SEIU Political Fight Back fee had, then, extracted a forced loan out of the nonmembers, coercing them to fund a political campaign they disagreed with and only offering to return the funds after the campaign had been won. This particularly troubles Alito with regard to Proposition 75 because “the effect of the SEIU’s procedure was to force many nonmembers to subsidize a political effort designed to restrict their own rights”.

Finally, SEIU had argued that its Political Fight Back fee was not political because for a public employees union “lobbying the electorate” is part of contract negotiations. Alito is not persuaded, finding this definition of contract negotiations “would effectively eviscerate the limitation of use of compulsory fees to support unions’ controversial political activities.” The Court therefore holds unions cannot impose extraordinary fees on nonmembers without first receiving nonmembers’ affirmative consent.

== Concurrence in Judgment ==
Justice Sotomayor, joined by Justice Ginsburg, concur in the judgment only. Sotomayor agrees that the SEIU Political Fight Back fee was for political activities and that nonmembers could not be forced to pay for political activities without being provided an opportunity to opt out. Sotomayor cannot agree, however, that the First Amendment allows such fees only after nonmembers opt in.

Because neither the question presented, briefed, or argued disputed the constitutionality of requiring nonmembers to opt out of fees, Sotommayor does not feel the Court has the power to make affirmatively opting into fees a constitutional requirement. Because what is chargeable and nonchargeable to nonmembers is uncertain, Sotomayor feels the “majority’s answer to its unasked constitutional question is not even clear.”

== Dissent ==
Justice Breyer, joined by Justice Kagan, dissent. Breyer agrees with SEIU that “lobbying the electorate” is a contract negotiation. As support, the San Francisco native cites a California statute permitting unions to engage in political lobbying. Agreeing with Sotomayor that the majority answered an unasked constitutional question, Breyer believes the majority's opt in requirement is “directly contrary to precedent.” Finally, Breyer laments that the majority's opinion is “virtually guaranteed” to “play a central role in the ongoing, intense political debate” regarding Right to Work laws.

== Reactions ==
The editors of the New York Times disliked the outcome, decrying that "the legal approach is indistinguishable from politics." Erwin Chemerinsky called Knox the term's "biggest sleeper case". Chermerinsky would later write that Knox should be read to increase union political power. Michael Dorf disliked Justice Alito's "broadly anti-union rhetoric". Students on the Harvard Law Review called the case "undoubtedly represents a watershed moment in the field of union campaign finance" and welcomed "a restraint on government power to rig the marketplace of ideas".

The court would soon extend First Amendment protections against unions in Harris v. Quinn (2014). California Proposition 32 again failed to limit union payroll deductions in the 2012 general election.

== See also ==
- Janus v. AFSCME
- List of United States Supreme Court cases by the Roberts Court
- List of United States Supreme Court cases involving the First Amendment
