= Janus v. AFSCME =

- Supreme Court of the United States

Argued February 26, 2018 Decided June 27, 2018
- Full case name: Mark Janus v. American Federation of State, County, and Municipal Employees, Council 31, et al.
- Docket no.: 16-1466
- Citations: 585 U.S. 878 (more) 138 S. Ct. 2448; 201 L. Ed. 2d 924

Case history
- Prior: Judgment for defendants, No. 1:15-cv-01235 (N.D. Ill. Sept. 13, 2016); affirmed, 851 F.3d 746 (7th Cir. 2017); cert. granted, 138 S. Ct. 54 (2017).

Questions presented
- Should Abood be overruled and public sector agency fee arrangements declared unconstitutional under the First Amendment?

Holding
- 1. The District Court had jurisdiction over petitioner’s suit.; 2. The State’s extraction of agency fees from nonconsenting public-sector employees violates the First Amendment. Abood erred in concluding otherwise, and stare decisis cannot support it. Abood is therefore overruled.; 3. For these reasons, States and public-sector unions may no longer extract agency fees from nonconsenting employees.

Court membership
- Chief Justice John Roberts Associate Justices Anthony Kennedy · Clarence Thomas; Ruth Bader Ginsburg · Stephen Breyer; Samuel Alito · Sonia Sotomayor; Elena Kagan · Neil Gorsuch

Case opinions
- Majority: Alito, joined by Roberts, Kennedy, Thomas, Gorsuch
- Dissent: Sotomayor
- Dissent: Kagan, joined by Ginsburg, Breyer, Sotomayor

Laws applied
- U.S. Const. amend. I
- This case overturned a previous ruling or rulings
- Abood v. Detroit Board of Education (1977)

Janus v. American Federation of State, County, and Municipal Employees, Council 31, 585 U.S. 878 (2018), abbreviated Janus v. AFSCME, is a landmark decision of the US Supreme Court on US labor law, concerning the power of labor unions to collect fees from non-union members. Under the Taft–Hartley Act of 1947, which applies to most of the private sector, union security agreements can be allowed by state law. The Supreme Court ruled that such union fees in the public sector violate the First Amendment right to free speech, overruling the 1977 decision in Abood v. Detroit Board of Education that had previously allowed such fees.

== Background ==
=== Abood v. Detroit Board of Education ===
The National Labor Relations Act of 1935 authorized trade unions in the private sector to be established to represent employees in collective bargaining for wages and other benefits from employers. Frequently, unions also engage in political activity to support their goals by donating to political campaigns. These activities are paid for through fees and dues collected from its members. Some unions are also able to collect fees from non-members in the same workplace through agency shop or union equity agreements. For unions within the public sector (unions that include members working for state and local governments), which are governed by individual state laws, the use of such agreements had been previously allowed by the Supreme Court in Abood v. Detroit Board of Education (1977), which determined that as long as such dues collected from non-members were used only for the union's purposes of collective bargaining, contract administration, and grievance adjustment, it did not violate the non-members' First Amendment rights. It was also determined in Marquez v. Screen Actors Guild Inc. (1998) that private-sector unions have a duty of fair representation to all workers in a bargaining unit under the National Labor Relations Act, and that unions were allowed to negotiate agreements which state that "membership" was required as a condition of continued employment, even though the Taft-Hartley Act of 1947 had outlawed agreements requiring formal union membership. About 22 states have unions with these collective agreements in place that apply to their public sector workers.

=== Challenges to Abood ===
Since about 2006, with the appointment of Justice Samuel Alito, which gave the Court a conservative advantage, groups opposing agency fees, such as the National Right to Work Legal Defense Foundation, have brought cases challenging Abood. These groups contended that within the public sector all union activities could be considered political, since they ultimately seek to influence government policy, and thus violate the First Amendment.

Knox v. Service Employees International Union, Local 1000 (2012) considered a "Temporary Special Assessment to Create a Political Fight-Back Fund" imposed upon a class of 42,000 State of California employees who were nonmembers, the Court held that a union had violated their rights by collecting fees in the absence of the notice and procedural requirements of Teachers Local No. 1 v. Hudson, 475 U.S. 292 (1986). While the case did not directly challenge Abood, the Court called into question the continued viability of Abood, as well as an earlier decision, Machinists v. Street, 367 U.S. 740 (1961), stating that "dissent is not to be presumed—it must affirmatively be made known to the union by the dissenting employee", which has been used by unions to justify payment of full union dues from nonmembers who do not, in addition to remaining nonmembers, object to paying fees equal to full union dues.

Harris v. Quinn (2014) considered the validity of an agency fee policy affecting home health care workers receiving public funds in the state of Illinois. The Supreme Court held that the health care workers were not public-sector employees and thus could not be required to pay agency fees. While the Court did not rule directly on the First Amendment challenges to Abood in this decision, the majority opinion questioned the validity of Abood. Justice Alito, writing for the Court, stated in the decision from Harris that within the public sector, every activity of a public sector union could be considered political. "In the public sector, core issues such as wages, pensions, and benefits are important political issues, but that is generally not so in the private sector. ... [A]s state and local expenditures on employee wages and benefits have mushroomed, the importance of the difference between bargaining in the public and private sectors has been driven home."

=== Procedural history ===
The immediate case began in 2015 when newly elected Illinois governor Bruce Rauner took office. Rauner had run on an anti-union platform, and once in office, he issued an executive order that suspended collection of agency fees from non-union members who benefitted from a contract negotiated by the American Federation of State, County and Municipal Employees (AFSCME), which represented Illinois public sector employees. Rauner also preemptively filed a lawsuit in the United States District Court for the Northern District of Illinois against the AFSCME to challenge agency shop agreements as unconstitutional violations of the First Amendment. (Case 15-C-1235). Rauner used the decision from Harris to support these actions, arguing that agency-shop agreements violate nonmembers' right to free speech. Rauner's executive order and comptroller instructions were challenged by AFSCME and other unions.

In Rauner's federal case, the unions sought to dismiss the case, claiming he had no standing. In May 2015, the District Court judge found that Rauner lacked sufficient standing to issue the challenge, as he had "no personal interest at stake." Three state employees attempted to join the suit as co-plaintiffs, but the judge denied this order. Instead, the judge allowed the case to continue with the three employees as the sole plaintiffs. These employees included Mark Janus, an Illinois child support specialist, who had contested the fees.

Janus claimed that he should not need to pay fees to AFSCME because doing so constitutes paying for political speech with which Janus disagrees. Under Illinois law, state government can require its employees to pay fees to a government union as a condition of employment. In March 2015, the three government employees represented by attorneys from the Illinois-based Liberty Justice Center and Virginia-based National Right to Work Legal Defense Foundation took legal action to intervene in the case. In May 2015, after Rauner was dropped from the case, it proceeded under the name Janus v. AFSCME.

Meanwhile, Friedrichs v. California Teachers Ass'n (2016) had been working its way to the Supreme Court, which dealt with a similar complaint. In July 2015, after Friedrichs had been issued certiorari by the Supreme Court, the Illinois suit was put on hold pending Friedrichs. The Supreme Court heard the case, which challenged the Ninth's Circuit's decision affirming Abood. Before the Court could issue the decision, however, Justice Antonin Scalia died in February 2016, and the case was decided 4–4, leaving in place the Ninth Circuit decision. Observers believed that the Court would have likely ruled against agency fees based on the progression of the case.

With no decision from Friedrichs, the Illinois cases were restarted. A new complaint was filed by Janus and other plaintiffs, alleging that the fees they paid under an agency-shop agreement violated their First Amendment rights. The unions sought to dismiss the case, arguing that Abood was settled law. The District Court dismissed the case. On appeal in May 2017, the Seventh Circuit affirmed the District Court's ruling to dismiss the case on the basis of Abood. (16-3638).

== Supreme Court ==
Oral arguments
Recording of oral arguments before the Supreme Court.

On April 10, 2017, Neil Gorsuch was appointed to succeed the late Justice Antonin Scalia. Justice Gorsuch was widely expected to side with conservative bloc, who ruled against the unions in Friedrichs. Observers believed that based on the past deliberations, the decisions in Harris and Friedrichs, and Gorsuch's conservative jurisprudence, Janus would likely prevail before the Supreme Court. Janus petitioned for a writ of certiorari from the Supreme Court, which was granted on September 28, 2017. The Supreme Court heard the oral argument of the parties on February 26, 2018.

=== Opinion of the Court ===
On June 27, 2018, the Court ruled in a 5–4 decision that the application of public sector union fees to non-members is a violation of the First Amendment, ruling against AFSCME. Justice Alito wrote for the Court, joined by Justices Roberts, Kennedy, Thomas, and Gorsuch. Alito wrote that agency-shop agreements violate "the free speech rights of nonmembers by compelling them to subsidize private speech on matters of substantial public concern." Alito recognized that losing these fees would put a financial burden on the public sector unions, who would continue to have to represent nonmembers even without their agency fees, but stated that "we must weigh these disadvantages against the considerable windfall that unions have received." In the decision, the Court held that the conclusion reached by Abood was inconsistent with the First Amendment and thus overruled that decision.

=== Dissent ===
Justice Elena Kagan wrote a dissenting opinion, joined by Justices Ginsburg, Breyer, and Sotomayor. Referring to Abood, Kagan criticized the majority opinion as one that "overthrow[ed] a decision entrenched in this nation's law—and in its economic life—for over 40 years." Justice Sotomayor wrote her own separate dissent, critical of the weight given to First Amendment protections that had been established in Sorrell v. IMS Health Inc. (2011) and used by the Court in cases like National Institute of Family and Life Advocates v. Becerra (2018).

== Subsequent developments ==
Public-sector union officials predicted that they would lose 10 to 30 percent of their members and tens of millions of dollars in revenue in the states that would be affected. The nation's two largest public sector unions lost the vast majority of agency-fee payers after the ruling. American Federation of State, County and Municipal Employees went from 112,233 nonmember agency-fee payers to 2,215 (a 98% decline) while Service Employees International Union went from 104,501 to 5,812 (94%), as per 2018 filings. However, there was little change in the numbers of dues-paying members; AFSCME retained 94% of its members.

Following the Supreme Court ruling, Mark Janus left his job with the state of Illinois to join the Liberty Justice Center, a libertarian public policy law firm that funded his case.

Professionals in other fields have raised legal challenges to mandatory dues. For example, attorneys in Wisconsin have challenged the "integrated bar" requirement in their state, which (like more than half of US states) requires all practicing attorneys to be dues-paying members of the state bar association, under the same reasoning as Janus. The case, Jarchow v. State Bar of Wisconsin, was initially dismissed by the Western District Court of Wisconsin. The 7th Circuit Court of Appeals upheld the District Court's decisions and the plaintiffs subsequently appealed this case to the Supreme Court, where their writ of certiorari was denied on June 1, 2020, over the dissents of Justices Thomas and Gorsuch.

=== Award to Janus opposed ===
Janus received the Whittaker Chambers Award from the National Review Institute – an award opposed by the family of Whittaker Chambers, which caused the NRI to discontinue the award two years after its creation.

== See also ==
- United States labor law
- List of United States Supreme Court cases by the Roberts Court
- List of United States Supreme Court cases involving the First Amendment
- Franchise Tax Board of California v. Hyatt (2019)
- Knick v. Township of Scott, Pennsylvania (2019)
