= Friedrichs v. California Teachers Association =

- Supreme Court of the United States

Argued January 11, 2016 Decided March 29, 2016
- Full case name: Rebecca Friedrichs, et al., Petitioners v. California Teachers Association, et al.
- Docket no.: 14-915
- Citations: 578 U.S. 1 (more) 136 S. Ct. 1083; 194 L. Ed. 2d 255
- Argument: Oral argument
- Opinion announcement: Opinion announcement

Case history
- Subsequent: Rehearing denied

Holding
- The judgment was affirmed by an equally-divided court.

Court membership
- Chief Justice John Roberts Associate Justices Anthony Kennedy · Clarence Thomas; Ruth Bader Ginsburg · Stephen Breyer; Samuel Alito · Sonia Sotomayor; Elena Kagan

Case opinion
- Per curiam

Friedrichs v. California Teachers Association, 578 U.S. 1 (2016), is a United States labor law case that came before the Supreme Court of the United States. At issue in the case was whether Abood v. Detroit Board of Education (1977) should be overruled, with public-sector "agency shop" arrangements invalidated under the First Amendment, and whether it violates the First Amendment to require that public employees affirmatively object to subsidizing nonchargeable speech by public-sector unions, rather than requiring employees to consent affirmatively to subsidizing such speech. Specifically, the case concerned public sector collective bargaining by the California Teachers Association, an affiliate of the National Education Association.

Justice Antonin Scalia died shortly after the case was argued in front of the Supreme Court, leaving only eight members to decide the case. In the end, the result was a non-precedential per curiam opinion affirming the lower-court decision by an equally-divided Supreme Court. On June 28, 2016, the rehearing petition submitted by the Center for Individual Rights (CIR) was denied, letting the Ninth Circuit's decision stand as its final judgment.

In 2017, after regaining a ninth Justice, the Supreme Court agreed to hear a substantially similar case, Janus v. AFSCME.

== Background ==
In the 1977 case Abood v. Detroit Board of Education, the Supreme Court upheld the maintaining of a union shop in a public workplace. Public school teachers in Detroit had sought to overturn the requirement that they pay fees equivalent to union dues on the grounds that they opposed public sector collective bargaining and objected to the ideological activities of the union. The court affirmed that the union shop, which is legal in the private sector, is also legal in the public sector. They found that non-members may be assessed dues for "collective bargaining, contract administration, and grievance adjustment purposes", but that objectors to union membership or policy may not have their dues used for other ideological or political purposes.

=== Initial lawsuit ===
The Center for Individual Rights (CIR), a conservative law firm which brought the Friedrichs case with funding from the Bradley Foundation, initiated contact with the plaintiffs, ten public school teachers who had paid agency fees. The lead plaintiff, Orange County elementary teacher Rebecca Friedrichs, had previously served on her local union's executive committee.

=== Death of Antonin Scalia ===
Many legal commentators speculated that the death of Justice Antonin Scalia would make the Court either divide evenly on the case, letting the Ninth Circuit's ruling stand against the plaintiffs but not setting a precedent, or call for reargument once Scalia's vacancy has been filled.

== Decision ==
On March 29, 2016, the Supreme Court issued a one-line per curiam opinion affirming the Ninth Circuit; as a decision made by an equally-divided court, the case is not considered to set a legal precedent. The Center for Individual Rights (CIR) said it plans to ask the Supreme Court to reevaluate the case once a ninth justice has been appointed to replace Scalia. CIR's rehearing petition was ultimately denied on June 28, 2016.

However, in 2017, after regaining a ninth Justice, the Supreme Court agreed to hear a substantially similar case, Janus v. AFSCME.

In July 2020, Friedrichs was a guest on Laura Ingraham's Fox News program. Friedrichs, after saying how warmed she was by Ingraham's support of her anti-union verve, claimed that the pushback by unions over reopening classrooms is a "smokescreen" for "using our schools to sexualize our children and to train them in anti-American ideology." She also claimed that teachers' unions "are teaching our children to sext, to view pornography, [unions] are hooking them up with online sex experts. So what they are doing is grooming our children for sexual predators to use them."

== Legacy ==
Rebecca Friedrichs, the plaintiff, was a speaker at the 2020 Republican National Convention.

== See also ==
- List of United States Supreme Court cases by the Roberts Court
- List of United States Supreme Court cases involving the First Amendment
