= Liberty Justice Center =

American law firm

- Abbreviation: LJC
- Formation: 2011
- Type: 501(c)(3) organization
- Tax ID no.: 45-4204425
- Headquarters: 1629 K St NW suite 300 Washington, DC 20006
- Chair: Sara Albrecht
- Staff: 15 (2025)
- Website: libertyjusticecenter.org

The Liberty Justice Center (LJC) is an American non-profit public interest law firm. It was founded in Chicago in 2011.

In April 2025, LJC successfully sued the Trump administration in the United States Court of International Trade with the case V.O.S. Selections, Inc. v. Trump.

== History ==
The Liberty Justice Center (LJC) was founded in Chicago in 2011 as a nonprofit public-interest litigation firm focused on constitutional law and economic liberty.

During its early years, the organization litigated cases primarily in Illinois, including challenges to municipal regulations and taxation policies. The group filed lawsuits against the City of Chicago over its regulation of home-sharing services and challenged local sign ordinances in suburban communities.

The organization gained national attention through its representation of Illinois state employee Mark Janus in the U.S. Supreme Court case Janus v. AFSCME (2018). In a 5–4 decision, the Court held that requiring public-sector employees to pay union agency fees violates the First Amendment.

Following the Janus decision, the organization expanded its litigation nationwide, filing cases addressing labor law, administrative law, and economic regulation in courts across the United States and Puerto Rico.

In 2020, the organization relocated its headquarters to Austin, Texas.

In 2026, the organization prevailed in consolidated litigation before the U.S. Supreme Court challenging tariffs imposed under the International Emergency Economic Powers Act (IEEPA). The Court held that the statute does not authorize the president to impose tariffs, limiting the scope of executive authority over trade.

By 2025, the Liberty Justice Center had litigated cases in 36 states and Puerto Rico, reflecting its expansion into a nationwide public-interest litigation practice.

== Cases ==
The Liberty Justice Center does not accept government funding of any kind, and has a selective caseload focused on suing the government and defending constitutional rights. LJC sued the City of Chicago in 2016 over its regulations for home-sharing, and according to the Chicago Tribune attorneys called the city’s regulations "draconian." LJC has also sued the City of Chicago over its so-called "Netflix tax" on web-based streaming services. The Chicago Tribune reported in 2015 that LJC sued the village of Downers Grove in suburban Chicago over a ban on painted wall signs. LJC has also sued over Illinois' campaign contribution limits.

=== Harris v. Quinn ===
In 2014, the Supreme Court of the United States ruled in favor of Illinois woman Pam Harris in the case of Harris v. Quinn. The ruling meant that thousands of home caregivers in Illinois and nationally were no longer classified as state employees and no longer forced to pay union fees or dues. LJC successfully petitioned the state to expand this ruling to home childcare providers, meaning approximately 50,000 Illinois day care providers were no longer forced to pay dues to the SEIU.

=== Janus v. American Federation of State, County, and Municipal Employees, Council 31 ===
LJC provided pro bono legal representation to child support specialist Mark Janus in the U.S. Supreme Court case Janus v. American Federation of State, County, and Municipal Employees, Council 31. The court heard oral arguments in this case on February 26, 2018.

The case came about in March 2015, when three government workers from Illinois represented by attorneys from LJC took legal action to challenge union fair share dues. The case is named after Mark Janus, an Illinois child support specialist covered by a collective bargaining agreement. Janus argued that he should not need to pay fees to the American Federation of State, County and Municipal Employees because doing so constitutes paying for political speech with which he disagrees. Under Illinois law at the time, public employees who declined to join the union could still be required to pay an agency fee to the union as a condition of employment.

=== BST Holdings, LLC v. OSHA ===
In 2021, the Liberty Justice Center represented BST Holdings, LLC and other challengers to the Occupational Safety and Health Administration's COVID-19 vaccination-or-testing emergency temporary standard for large employers. OSHA issued the rule in November 2021, requiring employers with 100 or more employees to adopt a mandatory vaccination policy or require unvaccinated employees to wear face coverings and undergo weekly testing.

The case was among the consolidated challenges to the OSHA rule. In January 2022, the U.S. Supreme Court stayed enforcement of the rule, holding that the challengers were likely to succeed on their claim that OSHA lacked authority to impose the mandate. OSHA withdrew the rule as an enforceable emergency temporary standard later that month. In February 2022, the U.S. Court of Appeals for the Sixth Circuit dismissed the consolidated challenges as moot after the rule was withdrawn.

=== V.O.S. Selections, Inc. v. Trump ===
In April 2025, LJC sued the Trump administration in the United States Court of International Trade with the case V.O.S. Selections, Inc. v. Trump, in what LJC argued was an unconstitutional overreach of executive branch authority by unilaterally imposing tariffs on nearly all imports and almost overnight jeopardizing entire business models of several enterprises.

The case has been featured in national news outlets as such as The Wall Street Journal, Bloomberg, Forbes, and The Hill, among others as part of a broader series of public-interest law firms filing suit against the Trump administration's unilateral installation of tariffs on April 2, 2025, labeled Trump's "Liberation Day" tariffs.

James Fanelli reported in The Wall Street Journal in May 2025 that "Other challenges have been filed in the court and in federal district courts around the country, but the V.O.S. case is front and center so far."

The Daily Beast reported that the LJC had sued Trump for what it called an "unprecedented power grab".

=== Learning Resources, Inc. v. Trump; V.O.S. Selections, Inc. v. Trump ===
In February 2026, the Liberty Justice Center prevailed in consolidated tariff litigation before the U.S. Supreme Court challenging tariffs imposed under the International Emergency Economic Powers Act (IEEPA).

The Court held that IEEPA does not authorize the president to impose tariffs, concluding that such authority rests with Congress absent a clear statutory delegation.

The litigation consisted of two related cases: Learning Resources, Inc. v. Trump, filed in federal district court, and V.O.S. Selections, Inc. v. Trump, filed in the United States Court of International Trade. The Supreme Court determined that the district court lacked jurisdiction over the claims in Learning Resources and directed that case to be dismissed on jurisdictional grounds, while allowing the trade court case to proceed.

The Court ultimately resolved the case on the merits in V.O.S. Selections, affirming that the tariffs were unlawful. The decision significantly limited the use of emergency economic powers to impose tariffs and reinforced the constitutional allocation of tariff authority to Congress.

The Wall Street Journal described the case as "the biggest win in the Liberty Justice Center’s 15-year history", but wrote that it was financially costly to the Center. The Center said that the case cost the equivalent of its typical annual budget, and that it lost more than 30% of its annual donors over the case.

=== Burlap and Barrel, Inc. v. Trump ===
In March 2026, the Liberty Justice Center filed Burlap and Barrel, Inc. v. Trump in the United States Court of International Trade, challenging the Trump administration’s imposition of global tariffs under Section 122 of the Trade Act of 1974.

The lawsuit was brought on behalf of spice importer Burlap & Barrel, Inc. and toy company Basic Fun!, and followed a February 2026 U.S. Supreme Court decision holding that the administration’s earlier tariffs imposed under the International Emergency Economic Powers Act (IEEPA) were unlawful.

The plaintiffs argue that Section 122 permits temporary trade restrictions only in response to specific international economic conditions, such as a “large and serious” balance-of-payments deficit, and does not authorize broad, worldwide tariffs based on the existence of a trade deficit.

The case raises constitutional questions regarding the separation of powers and the scope of presidential authority over tariffs, which are traditionally vested in Congress.

On May 7, 2026, a divided three-judge panel of the Court of International Trade ruled in favor of Burlap & Barrel, Basic Fun!, and the State of Washington, holding that the Section 122 tariffs were “invalid” and “unauthorized by law” and entering a permanent injunction limited to those importer plaintiffs. The Trump administration appealed the ruling the next day, with the case proceeding to the United States Court of Appeals for the Federal Circuit.

== Section 301 tariffs litigation ==
On July 24, 2026, the Liberty Justice Center filed Burlap & Barrel, Inc. and Collective Horology LLC v. Greer et al. in the United States Court of International Trade on behalf of Burlap & Barrel, a New York-based spice importer, and Collective Horology LLC, a California-based watch retailer.

The lawsuit challenges tariffs imposed under Section 301 of the Trade Act of 1974 on imports from 60 trading partners following investigations by the Office of the United States Trade Representative concerning forced labor. The complaint alleges that the Office of the United States Trade Representative exceeded its statutory authority by imposing broadly applicable tariffs without making sufficiently individualized findings regarding each investigated economy or adequately explaining how the selected tariffs would eliminate the identified practices, as required by Section 301.

The plaintiffs seek declaratory and injunctive relief invalidating the tariffs, an order preventing their enforcement, and certification of a class of similarly situated importers seeking refunds of duties paid under the challenged tariff action.

The case was filed on the same day as a separate challenge to the Section 301 tariffs brought by Learning Resources and several other importers. News coverage described the lawsuits as the latest legal challenges to the Trump administration's tariff policies following earlier litigation over tariffs imposed under the International Emergency Economic Powers Act and Section 122 of the Trade Act of 1974.

=== Parental rights litigation ===
The Liberty Justice Center has participated in litigation concerning parental notification policies and state regulation of school districts in California.

==== Chino Valley Unified School District v. Bonta ====
In 2023, the Liberty Justice Center represented the Chino Valley Unified School District in litigation arising after California Attorney General Rob Bonta filed suit to block a district policy requiring school officials to notify parents if a student requested to change their gender identification at school.

The State of California argued that the policy violated students’ privacy rights and could expose students to harm. The school district, represented by the Liberty Justice Center, defended the policy as consistent with parental rights and local control over education.

A state court issued a preliminary injunction blocking enforcement of the policy while the litigation proceeded.

==== Chino Valley Unified School District v. Newsom ====
In 2024, the Liberty Justice Center filed Chino Valley Unified School District v. Newsom in the United States District Court for the Eastern District of California on behalf of a California school district and several parents, challenging Assembly Bill 1955 (AB 1955), a state law restricting school policies that require parental notification regarding a student’s gender identity.

The law prohibits schools from requiring staff to disclose information about a student’s gender identity or sexual orientation to parents without the student’s consent. Supporters of the law argued it was intended to protect student privacy and safety, while opponents, including the plaintiffs, argued that it interferes with parental rights and the relationship between parents and schools.

The lawsuit alleges that AB 1955 violates constitutional protections, including rights under the First and Fourteenth Amendments.

=== Weiss v. Chicago Teachers Union ===
In October 2024, Liberty Justice Center filed Weiss v. Chicago Teachers Union in the Circuit Court of Cook County on behalf of four union members seeking access to the union’s financial audits.

The lawsuit alleges that the Chicago Teachers Union failed to provide audited financial reports to its members for several years, despite requirements in its internal bylaws.

In May 2025, a Cook County judge denied the union’s motion to dismiss, allowing the case to proceed to discovery.

The dispute has also drawn attention from federal lawmakers. In 2025, members of Congress initiated an inquiry into the Chicago Teachers Union’s financial disclosures and requested information regarding missing audits.

The case concerns union members’ rights to obtain financial disclosures under applicable labor law and internal governance requirements.

=== Glennon v. Johnson ===
In May 2025, it was reported that Bally's Corporation amended the terms of an initial public offering of stock in which Bally's had previously required purchasers of the stock to be of an ethnic minority background or female. Bally's changed the requirement of the stock offering to be open to anyone to be able to purchase, regardless of background, after LJC filed the Glennon v. Johnson lawsuit.

== Funding and governance ==
In the few years leading up to 2025, it received large donations from the National Christian Charitable Foundation, Club for Growth, and the Walton Family Foundation.

LJC has variously been described as free market, libertarian, and conservative. LJC was described by the Champaign News-Gazette newspaper in 2017 as having a "don't-tread-on-me approach toward political and economic freedom".

LJC also works to advance school choice and charter schools in the United States.

Since 2020, Sara Albrecht has been the firm's chair. Other members of the organization's board of directors include Corey A. DeAngelis, Ph.D. and Brian Timpone

== See also ==
- Institute for Justice
- Pacific Legal Foundation
