= Non germane objector campaign =

The Non Germane Objector (NGO) Campaign was an American campaign in California to encourage workers who did not want to be members of a labour union to transition to NGO Status so they do not have to pay representative fees that were not germane to collective bargaining.

The campaign was formed in 2010 by Ken Hamidi (Kourosh Kenneth Hamidi) with support from the National Right to Work Legal Defense Foundation, Inc. The campaign's main message indicates "Give Yourself a Pay Raise", focusing on the reduction in representation fees paid by employees who have transitioned to "Non Germane Objector" (NGO) status.

The campaign occurs to some degree each year, as the form to request NGO status can only be filed in June of each year. Additionally, the request must be filed again every year.

== Process ==
By electing to transition to NGO status State of California employees are objecting to pay union dues for non-germane expenditures. However, these employees are still entitled to some union representation and union benefits. NGOs cannot have a voice in the direction of their union, they cannot elect union leaders or vote to accept or reject the results of contract negotiations.

== History ==
In 2008, Ken Hamidi ran for president of Service Employees International Union (SEIU) Local 1000 where he finished third. After his defeat in 2008, Hamidi started a campaign to challenge the SEIU 1000's annual financial audits. Hamidi and other formal "challengers" argue that the union's audit, done by an independent firm, is incorrect and that the percentage of non-germane spending is actually higher. In 2009, Hamidi formed his own union which is known as the California Professional Public Employees Association (CPPEA).

Additionally, the NGO civil society campaign is part of the attempt to build support for Ken Hamidi's union California Professional Public Employees Association (CPPEA) as an alternative to SEIU.

== See also ==
- Right-to-work law
- Strikebreaker
- United States labor law
