= Onevest =

Former investment crowdfunding site

Onevest Corporation
- Company type: Private
- Website type: Equity crowdfunding
- Headquarters: New York City, New York, U.S.
- Area served: Worldwide
- Founders: Alejandro Cremades; Tanya Prive; Shahab Kaviani
- Industry: Financial Services
- Registration: Required
- Launched: November 22, 2011

Onevest was a New York–based equity crowdfunding platform for startups, originally launched as RockThePost and acquired by Business Rockstars in April 2018. The platform is no longer active. As of 2026, the name “OneVest” is also used by a separate Canadian financial technology company founded in 2021 that develops wealth-management infrastructure for financial institutions.

== History ==
Rock The Post was founded by Alejandro Cremades and Tanya Prive. Their goal was to help entrepreneurs, including those without strong business connections, raise funds and gain exposure. The site was launched in November 2011. Initially the platform offered projects that could receive funding or in-kind contributions (e.g., time and/or materials), but switched to equity and debt-based funding only.

Rock The Post received $857,000 in seed money from a group of angel investors in February 2012.

On April 23, 2013, Rock The Post announced the addition of Barbara Corcoran to its board of directors. Barbara is one of the "Sharks" starring in the ABC TV show Shark Tank, where she has personally invested in over 20 startups. Corcoran is a contributor to the NBC's Today Show, and hosted "The Millionaire Broker with Barbara Corcoran" on CNBC.

=== Onevest ===
On July 16, 2014, Rock The Post announced the acquisition of CoFoundersLab, an online and in person matchmaking network.

In August 2015, Onevest completed self–crowdfunding on its own platform after raising a Series A round of financing of over $2M.

On July 27, 2016, Onevest announced it was acquiring its major direct competitor, FounderDating, in order to merge that platform with its very own CoFoundersLab. According to the announcement the result of the acquisition would increase the number of registered entrepreneurs to over 300,000 on the platform and now providing services to entrepreneurs that would range from idea to funding and beyond.

== Involvement with the JOBS Act ==
On June 4, 2013, RockThePost's CEO, Alejandro Cremades, was invited to attend the Champions of Change ceremony hosted by the White House. The Champions of Change program shares the stories of everyday people that have strengthened their communities through hard work and innovation. The event honored entrepreneurs who exemplify the promise of crowdfunding to fuel economic growth and community empowerment through innovative crowdfunding projects across the country.

In addition to being involved with the JOBS Act since the beginning, on June 6, 2013, the company's CEO, Alejandro Cremades, testified at the U.S. House Committee on Small Business to voice RockThePost's stance on the present challenges the company was facing as a changing industry and the future of equity crowdfunding.

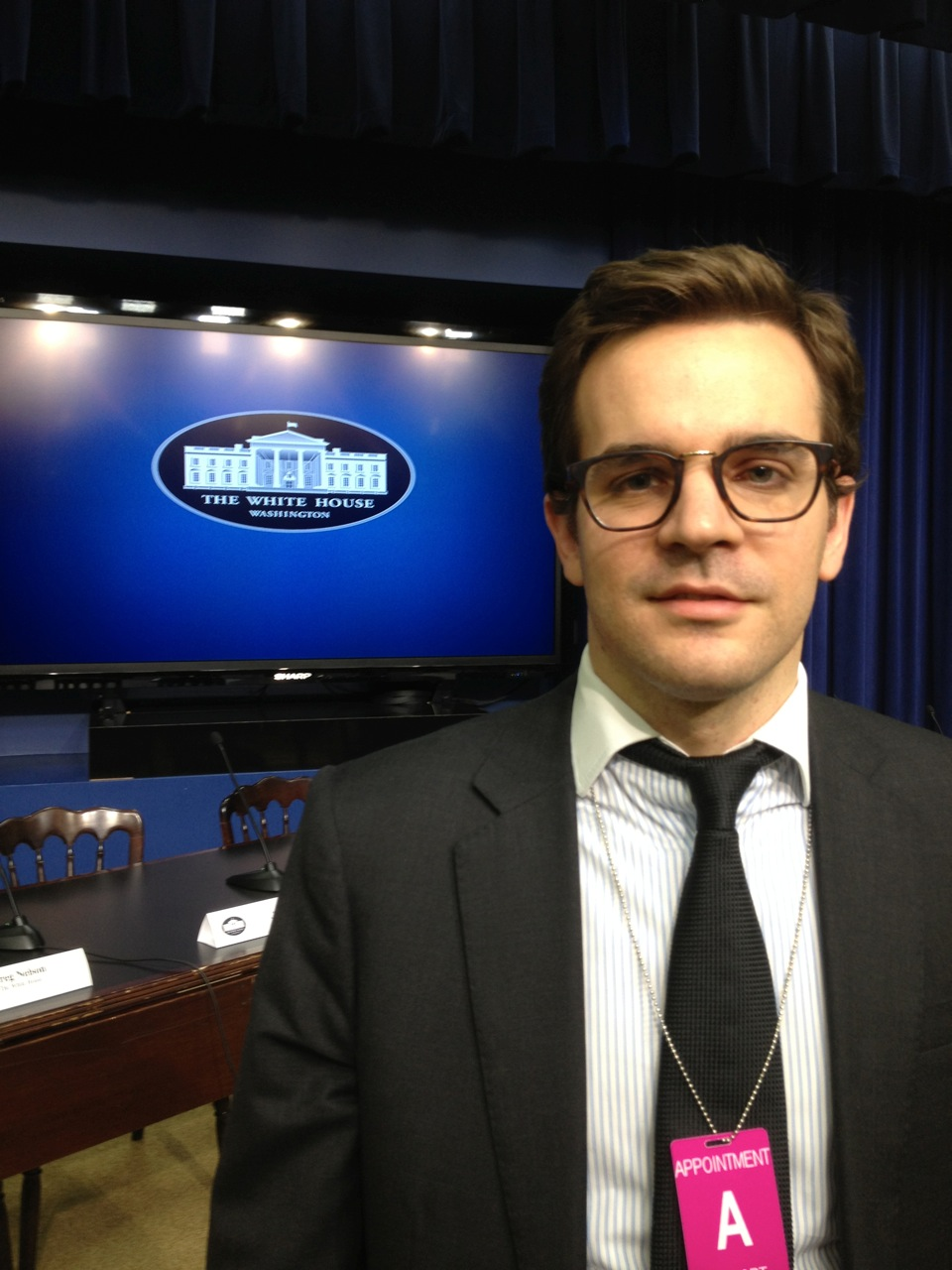
The CEO at RockThePost, Alejandro Cremades, was invited to the "Champions of Change" event hosted by The White House.

== Operations ==
The platform showcases startups and it is required that those posting projects have legitimate documentation in place prior to going live. The site accepts startups in the tech, healthcare, consumer, and hardware verticals. It focuses on "entrepreneurs, not dreamers", in trying to keep its platform legitimate and help eliminate some of the barriers that typically stand between startups and growth capital.

The site charges monthly subscription fees for launching venture pages. However, the registration on the platform is completely free of charge.

== News coverage ==
Time called it one of the best crowdfunding sites, in 2012.

It was cited by Business Insider as one of the top 10 startups to watch in NYC in 2012. The Wall Street Journal It has also been referred to by Market Watch, Alejandro Cremades was also cited in an article in Fast Company stating that money raised through crowdfunding is going towards businesses that are built to last. As the article states, for Rock The Post crowdfunding is not about funding your friends artisanal wrapping paper, it is about saving the U.S. economy.

Business Insider stated that one of Rock The Post's biggest differentiators is its tremendous customer service. From the reporter's point of view, it was surprising how project owners could call to speak with Rock The Post. Business Insider said that the site is yet another promising tool to help American entrepreneurs succeed and get the national economy back on track.

On an article published on June 18, 2012, Mashable mentioned how the ideal users for Rock The Post are small businesses and entrepreneurs looking to jump-start their startup by gaining the support and feedback of like-minded individuals.

TechCrunch published an article discussing how crowdfunding platform Rock The Post limits its projects to those created by legitimate entrepreneurs and SMBs to reduce risk for backers by providing tons of hands-on help during the funding process to help project creators increase their chances of being funded.

The same fact that was pointed out by TechCrunch was also cited on an article The Washington Post published mentioning the criticism other crowdfunding platforms had received for funded projects which never came to fruition, mentioning how Rock The Post's team vets the businesses first to select the ones that seem likely to succeed, looking specifically for a well-thought out and developed idea, a sustainable structure and a concrete plan.

In an interview with Inc. (magazine) on May 7, 2013, Cremades stated that RockThePost "helps entrepreneurs avoid the distractions of having to do the roadshow of closing the first round of financing, which normally takes on average eight months in addition to being able to do so from home or the office in 90 days, helping to concentrate on what is important, which is building the team and executing well on the vision."

In an interview with the Boston Herald Tanya Prive stated that the work that RockThePost is doing "democratizes the process of funding for startups and that the power of fundraising was going to be substantially increased."

Moreover, RockThePost was featured in Inc. (magazine) as one of the leading platforms for online fundraising for startups.

On June 24, 2013, Cremades stated in an interview to AlleyWatch that it was critical to embrace entrepreneurship given the fact that startup companies create over 3 million jobs every year in the US while large corporations are losing one million jobs.

The site was cited by Inc. Magazine in 2014 as one of the "50 best websites for entrepreneurs".

== See also ==
- Alejandro Cremades
- Comparison of crowd funding services
- Crowdfunding
- Crowdsourcing
- Jumpstart Our Business Startups Act
