= Corey DeAngelis =

American school choice advocate

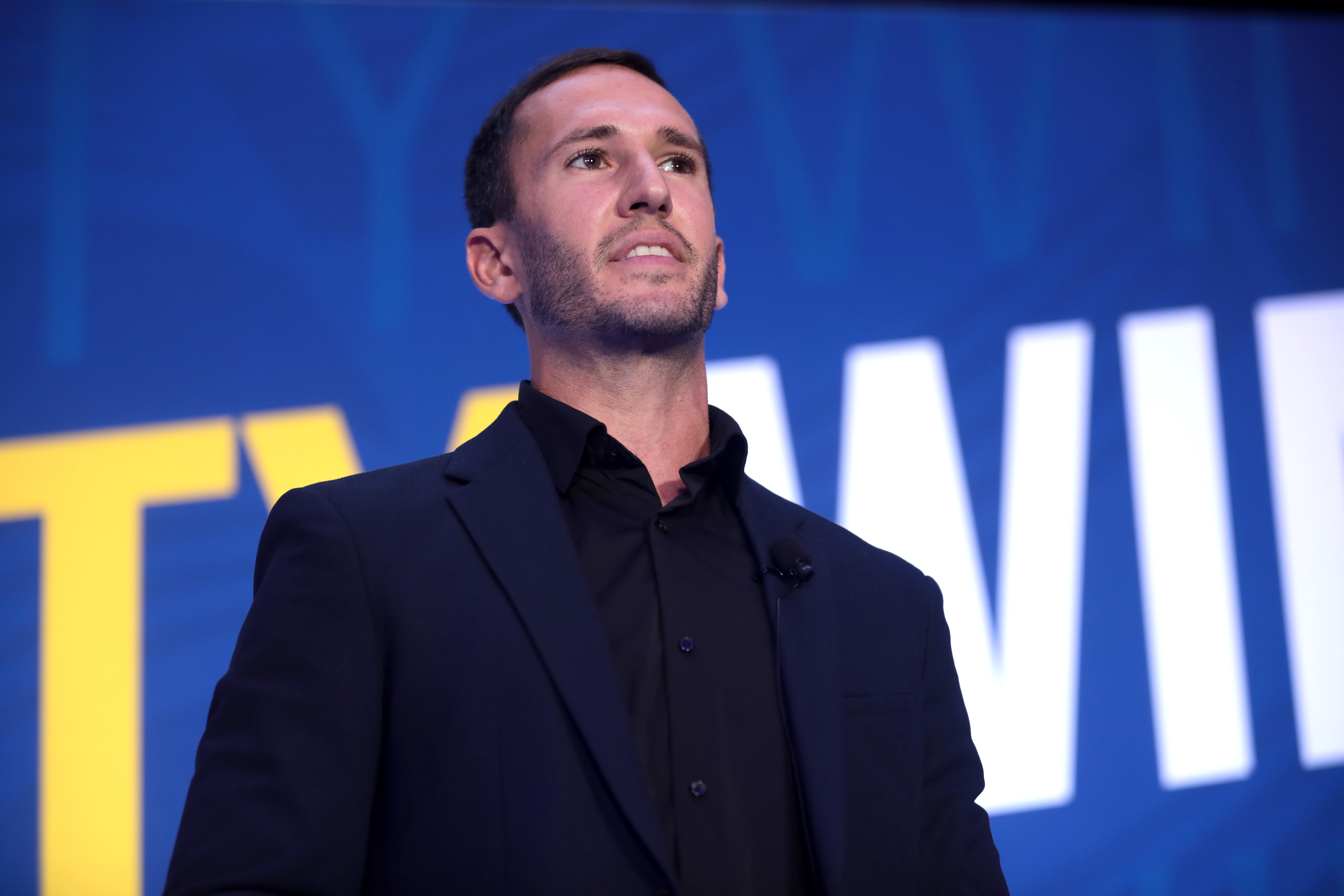
- DeAngelis in 2022
- Born: Corey A. DeAngelis
- Education: University of Texas at San Antonio; University of Arkansas, Fayetteville

Corey A. DeAngelis is an American advocate for school choice. In 2024, he released a book on school choice titled The Parent Revolution.

== Education ==
DeAngelis received his bachelor's and master's degrees from the University of Texas at San Antonio. He holds a Ph.D. from the University of Arkansas in education policy.

== Career ==
DeAngelis was an adjunct scholar at the Cato Institute, a libertarian think tank. He worked for the American Federation for Children, a conservative education nonprofit group founded by Betsy DeVos, from 2021 to 2024.

He joined the board of directors of the Liberty Justice Center in 2022. He has appeared on Fox News multiple times to as a commentator on education policy.

DeAngelis has described school choice as "a winner for Trump". He contributed to the Project 2025 document, in the section discussing education and the dissolution of the U.S. Department of Education.

In 2024, he released the book The Parent Revolution.

== Personal life ==
While in college, DeAngelis appeared in gay pornographic films. In 2024, reflecting on the experience, he said he was "lured" into participating with "promises he would be performing in fitness videos." He quit when he was asked to touch other performers. Robby Soave, reporting for Reason magazine, wrote that the reporting and subsequent events around the discovery of the adult film activity were acts of "classic cancel culture" and that "Conservatives who were happy to work with DeAngelis before but are participating in his cancellation now should reconsider. There is no tension between DeAngelis's decision, a decade ago...and his current work calling for more freedom in education."

== Awards and recognition ==
- Buckley Award – 2020
- Forbes 30 Under 30 2021 – Education
- Oklahoma Council of Public Affair’s 2022 Citizenship Award
