= Alejandro Cremades =

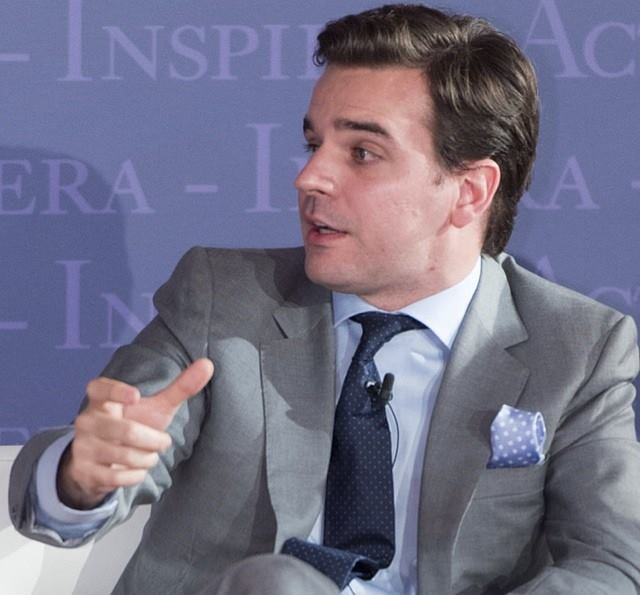
- Alejandro Cremades at the Georgetown Global Forum 2013
- Born: Zurich, Switzerland.
- Other name: acremades
- Education: Universidad San Pablo CEU; Fordham Law School
- Occupation: Entrepreneur
- Awards: see below
- Website: alejandrocremades.com

Alejandro Cremades (born in Zurich in 1985) is a Spanish author and entrepreneur based in New York City.

Born to Bernardo Cremades and Leticia Roman, Cremades attended primary school and high school at Colegio Retamar.

At the age of 22, he moved to the United States after obtaining his law degree at Universidad San Pablo CEU. In 2009 he obtained a master's degree in International Business and Trade Law at Fordham Law School.

Since August 2008, Cremades has been living in New York City, United States. Cremades has guest lectured on entrepreneurship at New York University Stern School of Business in New York, at the Wharton School of the University of Pennsylvania, and Columbia Business School. He has written articles on business and entrepreneurship that have been published in several international publications and has spoken at conferences.

Cremades has been featured on the Top 30 Under 30 lists of GQ Magazine, Entrepreneur Magazine, and Vanity Fair. He was also featured by TechCrunch as one of the expats that is shaping New York's tech.

== Entrepreneurial activities ==
In 2010, Cremades founded Rock the Post with the goal to help entrepreneurs, including those without strong business connections, raise funds and gain exposure. The site was launched in November 2011. Initially the platform offered projects that could receive funding or in-kind contributions (e.g., time and/or materials), but switched to equity and debt based funding only.

On July 16, 2014, RockThePost announced the acquisition of CoFoundersLab, an online and in person matchmaking network that claims to build startup teams scientifically, creating a platform with over 70,000 startup founders and 30,000 investors registered. The new combined entity is operating as Onevest.

On July 27, 2016, Cremades announced that Onevest was acquiring its major direct competitor, FounderDating, in order to merge that platform with its very own CoFoundersLab. According to the announcement the result of the acquisition would increase the number of registered entrepreneurs to over 300,000 on the platform and now providing services to entrepreneurs that would range from idea to funding and beyond.

On April 11, 2018, Onevest/CoFoundersLab was acquired by Business Rockstars. At this point the company had over 400,000 active registered members. The deal was worth millions according to a post published by Cremades on Forbes where he describes the 10 biggest lessons during the journey of building the company.

== Political involvement ==
On June 6, 2013, Cremades testified at the U.S. House Committee on Small Business to voice his stance on the challenges the company was facing as a changing industry and the future of equity crowdfunding.

Cremades is also a member of the Advisory Committee of the Spain U.S. Start-Up initiative of the Spain-U.S. Chamber of Commerce.

== Author ==
Cremades is the author of The Art of Startup Fundraising, published by John Wiley & Sons. In the book Cremades tries to distill everything he has learned in the past years down into an actionable guidebook for angel investors and startup founders. The book provides guidance on how startup funding works. Cremades also covers how the JOBS Act impacts the fundraising model, insights on startups from early stage to growth stage, crafting presentations and optimizing the strategy, building momentum, identifying the right investors, and avoiding the common mistakes. Geoffrey James, contributing editor for the magazine Inc., named it one of 2016's best books for entrepreneurs.
