= Harris v. Quinn =

- Supreme Court of the United States

Argued January 21, 2014 Decided June 30, 2014
- Full case name: Pamela Harris, et al., Petitioners v. Pat Quinn, Governor of Illinois, et al.
- Docket no.: 11-681
- Citations: 573 U.S. 616 (more) 134 S. Ct. 2618; 189 L. Ed. 2d 620

Case history
- Prior: 656 F.3d 692 (7th Cir. 2011); cert. granted, 570 U.S. 948 (2013).

Holding
- The First Amendment prohibits the collection of an agency fee from Rehabilitation Program PAs who do not want to join or support the union.

Court membership
- Chief Justice John Roberts Associate Justices Antonin Scalia · Anthony Kennedy; Clarence Thomas · Ruth Bader Ginsburg; Stephen Breyer · Samuel Alito; Sonia Sotomayor · Elena Kagan

Case opinions
- Majority: Alito, joined by Roberts, Scalia, Kennedy, Thomas
- Dissent: Kagan, joined by Ginsburg, Breyer, Sotomayor

Laws applied
- U.S. Const. amend. I

Harris v. Quinn, 573 U.S. 616 (2014), is a US labor law case of the United States Supreme Court regarding provisions of Illinois state law that allowed a union security agreement. Since the Taft-Hartley Act of 1947 prohibited the closed shop, states could still choose whether to allow unions to collect fees from non-union members since the collective agreements with the employer would still benefit non-union members. The Court decided 5–4 that Illinois's Public Labor Relations Act, which permitted the union security agreements, violated the First Amendment. A similar case was decided by the Court in 2018, Janus v AFSCME, overturning the Court's unanimous decision in Abood v. Detroit Board of Education (1977) which the appeals court had upheld in Harris.

== Facts ==
The National Right to Work Legal Defense Foundation argued a claim against the Illinois's Public Labor Relations Act, on the ground that it violated the First Amendment. It allowed labor unions to collect fees for the union from non-union members since they would still receive the services of improved pay and conditions made through collective bargaining. Staff worked for Illinois's Home Services Program and were paid by federal Medicaid funding to work as a "personal assistant" to people who needed care. Both the patient receiving care and the state (as confirmed by executive order) were regarded as the employer. The trade union was SEIU Healthcare Illinois & Indiana, which bargained with the state, after it was awarded exclusive representation of the caregivers following a card check election in 2003. The election was made possible by an executive order by then-Governor Rod Blagojevich, who had been heavily supported by SEIU in his 2002 election. The order reversed a 1985 ruling by a state labor board that said the workers were not state employees. While SEIU claimed to have signed cards representing majority support of the workers, the state has not been able to prove that it ever properly verified the vote.

Eight home health care workers objected to paying union security fees, and challenged the law on this ground. Pamela Harris was the lead petitioner in the case, who was paid by the state to care for her own son. She objected to being obligated to pay dues to the SEIU Healthcare Illinois & Indiana union even though she chose not to join the union.

The District court dismissed their claim, and the Seventh Circuit affirmed the decision, following Abood v. Detroit Board of Education.

== Judgment ==
The Court ruled that the workers could not be compelled to join the union since they were not fully-fledged state employees, as they are hired or fired by individual patients even if they are paid by Medicaid. The ruling did not invalidate compulsory union membership for the larger population of public employees, but Justice Samuel Alito's majority opinion argued that Abood v. Detroit Board of Education was erroneously decided.

Justice Elena Kagan wrote the dissenting opinion, joined by Ginsburg, Breyer, and Sotomayor, arguing that the principle in the Abood ruling should have been used in the case.

== Significance ==
The majority's opinion in Harris v. Quinn was largely condemned by labor unions, worker rights organizations, and the Democratic Party for overturning established precedent since the Taft-Hartley Act of 1947.

== See also ==
- List of United States Supreme Court cases by the Roberts Court
- List of United States Supreme Court cases involving the First Amendment
