= Small start units =

The word Small Start Unit (also called small start-up, or SSU) emerged as a business term to address small entities that plan to launch innovative and specific business models in the market place, -Not only on a larger geographical scale, but also with a vantage in technology that they offer- this gives them a sustainable competitive advantage, which they can use against (major) market competitors right from the beginning. SSUs are mainly of Western origin.

The business model of a Small start unit is to attract venture capitalists. Such Venture Capitalists supply the SSU with needed capital for the start-up. With this capital SSUs are able to set up the headquarters in their home market, typically a well-developed market in a Western country. Despite the disadvantage of higher costs, their competitive advantage enables them to generate new jobs in the home market by employing high-end engineers, marketing professionals and well educated managers.

== Characteristics ==
The characteristics of an SSU are:

1. The core competency resides in a future technology.
1. The aim is to operate on a global scale right from the beginning.
1. There is a high growth orientation within the firm.
1. A flexible network is related to them, consisting of internal and external stakeholders.
1. Able to fragment mass markets into niches.
1. Technology is built on open source technology.
1. Products are brought to markets rapidly.

== Goal ==
By pursuing a global approach, SSUs not only exploit emerging and lucrative selling markets, but also lower their costs and boost profits faster by embedding their business partner in emerging markets (see George S. Yip) into their value chain. SSUs take advantage of emerging markets as well as Western markets. Thus globalization allows SSUs to become long-lasting and successful(?) business entities.
