= Abood v. Detroit Board of Education =

- Supreme Court of the United States

Argued November 9, 1976 Decided May 23, 1977
- Full case name: D. Louis Abood v. Detroit Board of Education
- Docket no.: 75-1153
- Citations: 431 U.S. 209 (more) 97 S. Ct. 1782; 52 L. Ed. 2d 261; 1977 U.S. LEXIS 91
- Argument: Oral argument
- Opinion announcement: Opinion announcement

Case history
- Prior: 60 Mich. App. 92, 230 N.W.2d 322 (1975); probable jurisdiction noted, 425 U.S. 949 (1976).
- Subsequent: Rehearing denied, 433 U.S. 915 (1977).

Holding
- "Agency shop" clause whereby every employee represented by a union, even though not a union member, must pay to the union, as a condition of employment, a service charge equal in amount to union dues, was valid insofar as the service charges are used to finance expenditures by the union for collective bargaining, contract administration, and grievance adjustment purposes.

Court membership
- Chief Justice Warren E. Burger Associate Justices William J. Brennan Jr. · Potter Stewart; Byron White · Thurgood Marshall; Harry Blackmun · Lewis F. Powell Jr. William Rehnquist · John P. Stevens

Case opinions
- Majority: Stewart, joined by Brennan, White, Marshall, Rehnquist, Stevens
- Concurrence: Rehnquist
- Concurrence: Stevens
- Concurrence: Powell (in judgment), joined by Burger, Blackmun

Laws applied
- U.S. Const. amend. I
- Overruled by
- Janus v. AFSCME (2018)

Abood v. Detroit Board of Education, 431 U.S. 209 (1977), was a US labor law case where the United States Supreme Court upheld the maintaining of a union shop in a public workplace. Public school teachers in Detroit had sought to overturn the requirement that they pay fees equivalent to union dues on the grounds that they opposed public sector collective bargaining and objected to the political activities of the union. In a unanimous decision, the Court affirmed that the union shop, legal in the private sector, is also legal in the public sector. They found that non-members may be assessed agency fees to recover the costs of "collective bargaining, contract administration, and grievance adjustment purposes" while insisting that objectors to union membership or policy may not have their dues used for other ideological or political purposes.

Abood was overturned in the 2018 case Janus v. AFSCME, which found that Abood had failed to properly assess the First Amendment principles in its decision.

== Facts ==
Michigan law authorized agency shop agreements between public agencies and unions representing government workers. The Detroit Federation of Teachers was certified as the exclusive union for Detroit schoolteachers in 1967. D. Louis Abood, a school teacher, who objected to union membership and to the union's endorsements of political candidates, sued in Michigan state court in 1969.

Abood was represented by Michael A. Carvin, who asked the state court to rule against his clients so that he could appeal the case to the Supreme Court.

== Judgment ==
The Court upheld collective bargaining fees on the basis of private sector precedents in Railway Employees' Dept. v. Hanson (1956) and International Ass'n of Machinists v. Street (1961).

The restriction on union use of funds for non-collective-bargaining purposes was based on First Amendment protections regarding freedom of speech and association. The Court found,

[The] notion that an individual should be free to believe as he will, and that, in a free society, one's beliefs should be shaped by his mind and his conscience, rather than coerced by the State ... thus prohibit[s] the appellees from requiring any of the appellants to contribute to the support of an ideological cause he may oppose as a condition of holding a job as a public school teacher ... the Constitution requires ... that such [political union] expenditures be financed from charges, dues, or assessments paid by employees who do not object to advancing those ideas and who are not coerced into doing so against their will by the threat of loss of governmental employment.

Thus, in the United States' public sector, employees of the employer are entitled to not be members of the union, but they can be required to pay the documented costs of contract administration and negotiation. If they object, typically such a determination is submitted for hearing to a neutral arbitrator who will take evidence and render a final and binding decision as to the propriety of the fees assessed.

== Aftermath ==
Since Justice Samuel Alito's confirmation to the Supreme Court in 2006, anti-union groups have looked to challenge the decision of Abood by arguing that the inherent activities of a public section union including political campaigning that make it difficult to separate the use of non-member dues. The Court had prepared to rule on Friedrichs v. California Teachers Ass'n, No. 14-915, 578 U.S. ___ (2016), which appeared to be ready to overturn Abood, but with the death of Justice Antonin Scalia, the case was closed on a deadlock 4–4 decision that left Abood in place.

Abood was overruled in Janus v. AFSCME, No. 16-1466, 585 U.S. ___ (2018), which ruled that public sector unions may not collect fees from non-members. In Janus, the 5–4 majority agreed that Abood had not properly considered the First Amendment principles, and was "wrongly decided".

== See also ==
- List of United States Supreme Court cases by the Burger Court
- List of United States Supreme Court cases involving the First Amendment
